= National Museum of Brazil =

Museum in Rio de Janeiro, Brazil

- Museu Nacional
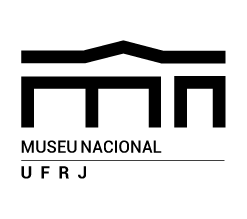

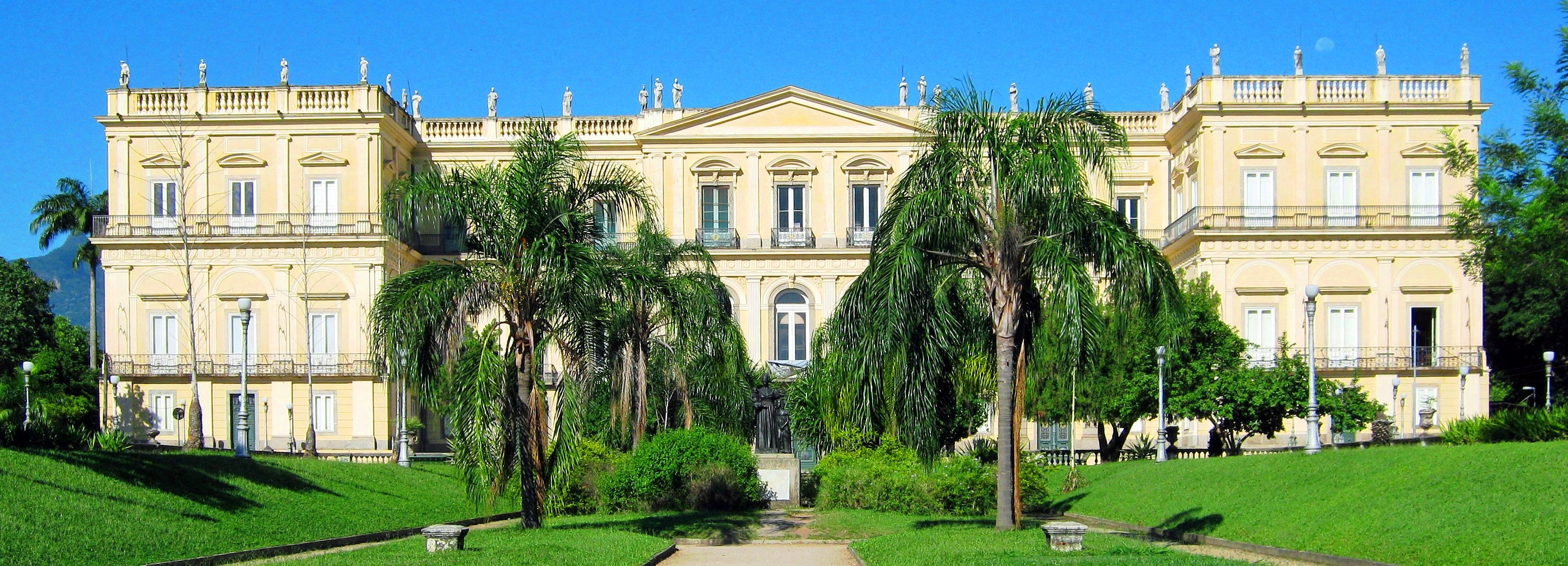
- Established: 6 June 1818
- Location: Quinta da Boa Vista in Rio de Janeiro, Brazil
- Coordinates: 22°54′21″S 43°13′34″W
- Type: Natural history, ethnology and archaeology
- Collection size: approx. 20 million objects (before 2018 fire), 1.5 million objects placed in other buildings (after 2 September 2018 fire)
- Visitors: approx. 150,000 (2017)
- Founder: King João VI of Portugal, Brazil and the Algarves
- Director: 2018–02.2026 Alexander Wilhelm Armin Kellner
- Owner: Federal University of Rio de Janeiro
- Website: museunacional.ufrj.br

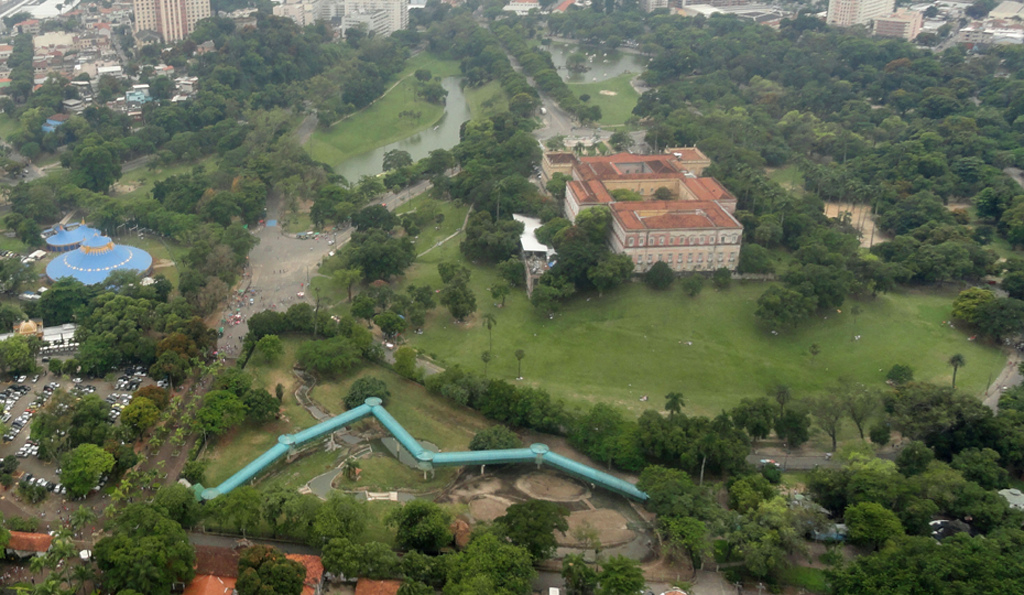
The former Imperial Palace that housed the National Museum at Quinta da Boa Vista Park and Zoo

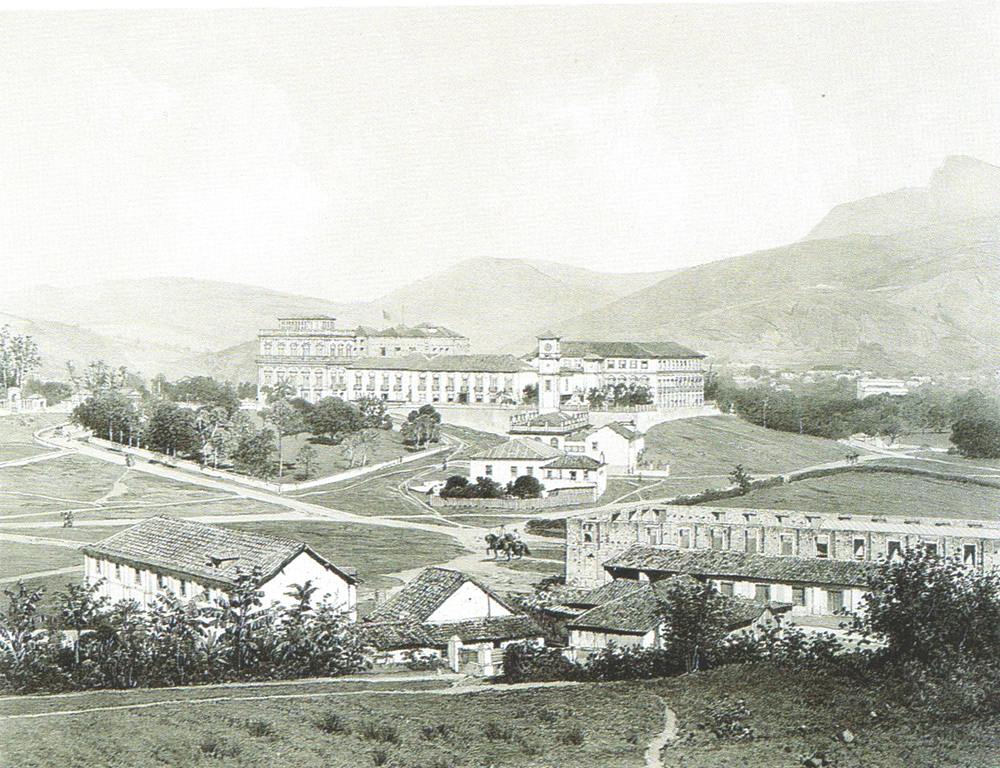
The Historical appearance of the initial building and surroundings

The National Museum of Brazil (Portuguese: Museu Nacional) is the oldest scientific institution of Brazil. It is located in the city of Rio de Janeiro, where it is installed in the Paço de São Cristóvão (Saint Christopher's Palace), which is inside the Quinta da Boa Vista. The main building was originally the residence of the House of Braganza in colonial Brazil, as the Portuguese royal family between 1808 and 1821 and then as the Brazilian imperial family between 1822 and 1889. After the monarchy was deposed, it hosted the Republican Constituent Assembly from 1889 to 1891 before being assigned to the use of the museum in 1892. The building was listed as Brazilian National Heritage in 1938 and was largely destroyed by a fire in 2018.

Founded by King João VI of Portugal, Brazil and the Algarves on 6 June 1818, under the name of "Royal Museum", the institution was initially housed at the Campo de Santana park, where it exhibited the collections incorporated from the former House of Natural History, popularly known as Casa dos Pássaros ("House of the Birds"), created in 1784 by the Viceroy of Brazil, Luís de Vasconcelos e Sousa, 4th Count of Figueiró, as well as collections of mineralogy and zoology. The museum foundation was intended to address the interests of promoting the socioeconomic development of the country by the diffusion of education, culture, and science. In the 19th century, the institution was already established as the most important South American museum of its type. In 1946, it was incorporated into the Federal University of Rio de Janeiro.

The National Museum held a vast collection with more than 20 million objects, one of the largest collections of natural history and anthropological artifacts in the world, encompassing some of the most important material records regarding natural science and anthropology in Brazil, as well as numerous items that came from other regions of the world and were produced by several cultures and ancient civilizations. Built-up over more than two centuries through expeditions, excavations, acquisitions, donations and exchanges, the collection was subdivided into seven main nuclei: geology, paleontology, botany, zoology, biological anthropology, archaeology, and ethnology. The collection was the principal basis for the research conducted by the academic departments of the museum – which are responsible for carrying out activities in all the regions of the Brazilian territory and several places of the world, including the Antarctic continent. The museum holds one of the largest scientific libraries of Brazil, with over 470,000 volumes and 2,400 rare works.

In the area of education, the museum offers specializations, extension and post-graduation courses in several fields of the knowledge, in addition to hosting temporary and permanent exhibitions and educational activities open to the general public. The museum manages the Horto Botânico (Botanical Garden), adjacent to the Paço de São Cristóvão, as well as an advanced campus in the city of Santa Teresa, in Espírito Santo – the Santa Lúcia Biological Station, jointly managed with the Museum of Biology Prof. Mello Leitão. A third site, located in the city of Saquarema, is used as a support and logistics center for field activities. Finally, the museum is also dedicated to editorial production, outstanding in that field the Archivos do Museu Nacional, the oldest scientific journal of Brazil, continuously published since 1876.

The palace, which housed a large part of the collection, was destroyed in a fire on the night of 2 September 2018. The building had been called a "firetrap" by critics, who argued the fire was predictable and could have been prevented. The fire began in the air-conditioning system of the auditorium on the ground floor. One of the three devices did not have external grounding, there was no individual circuit breaker for each of them, and a wire was without insulation in contact with metal. In the wake of the fire, the ruined edifice was being treated as an archaeological site and undergoing reconstruction efforts, with a metallic roof covering a 5,000 m^{2} area including debris.

In 2019, more than 30,000 pieces of the imperial family's past were found during archaeological works on Rio de Janeiro Zoological Garden nearby, part of Quinta da Boa Vista. Among the finds are many items such as fragments of crockery, cups, plates, cutlery, horseshoes and even buttons and brooches with imperial coat of arms from military clothing. Those items were given to the museum. After being destroyed by fire, the National Museum has received donations to the amount of R$ 1.1 million in seven months towards rebuilding efforts.

== History ==
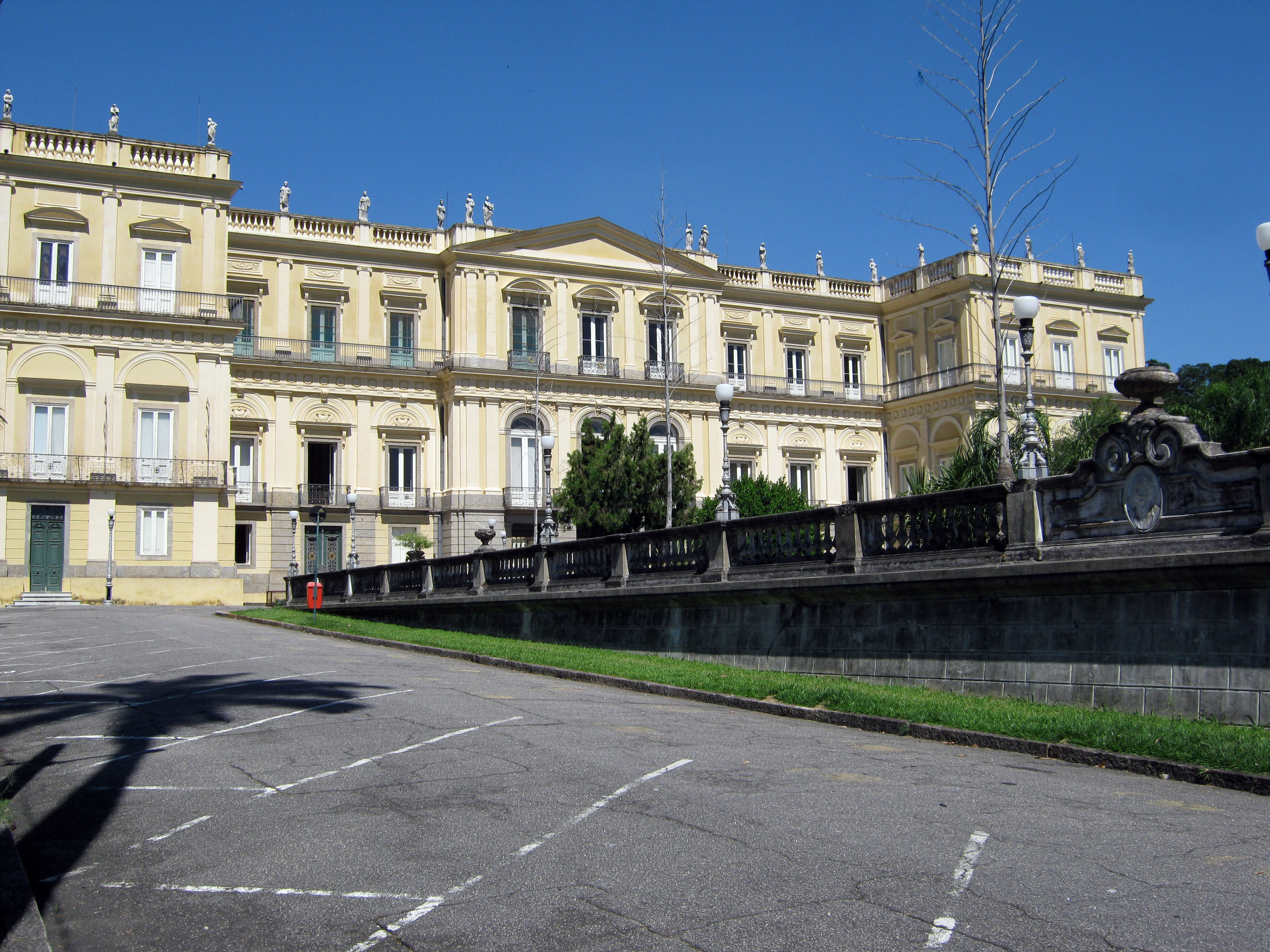
The former Imperial Palace that housed the National Museum

The National Museum was officially established by King João VI of Portugal, Brazil, and the Algarves (1769–1826) in 1818 with the name Royal Museum, in an initiative to stimulate scientific research in the Kingdom of Brazil, then a constituent part of the United Kingdom of Portugal, Brazil, and the Algarves. Initially, the museum housed plant and animal specimens, especially birds, which caused it to be known by locals n as the "House of the Birds".

After the marriage of King João VI's eldest son and Brazil's first emperor, Dom Pedro I (1798–1834), to H.I. & R.H. Archduchess Maria Leopoldina of Austria (1797–1826), the museum started to attract some of the greatest European naturalists of the 19th century, such as Maximilian zu Wied-Neuwied (1782–1867), Johann Baptist von Spix (1781–1826), and Carl Friedrich Philipp von Martius (1794–1868). Other European researchers who explored the country, such as Augustin Saint-Hilaire (1799–1853) and the Georg von Langsdorff (1774–1852), contributed to the collections of the Royal Museum.

By the end of the 19th century, reflecting the personal preferences of His Imperial Majesty Emperor Pedro II (1825–1891), the National Museum started to invest in the areas of the anthropology, paleontology and archaeology. The emperor himself, who was an avid amateur scientist and enthusiastic supporter of all branches of science, contributed with several of the collections of the art of Ancient Egypt, botanical fossils, etc., which he acquired during many of his trips abroad. In this way, the National Museum was modernized and became the most important museum of natural history and human sciences of South America. Edmund Roberts visited the museum in 1832, noting that the museum only had three open rooms at that time, and that the closed rooms were "sadly plundered of its contents by Don Pedro."

The National Museum at its first location in Campo de Sant'Anna, today's Praça da República, ca. 1870

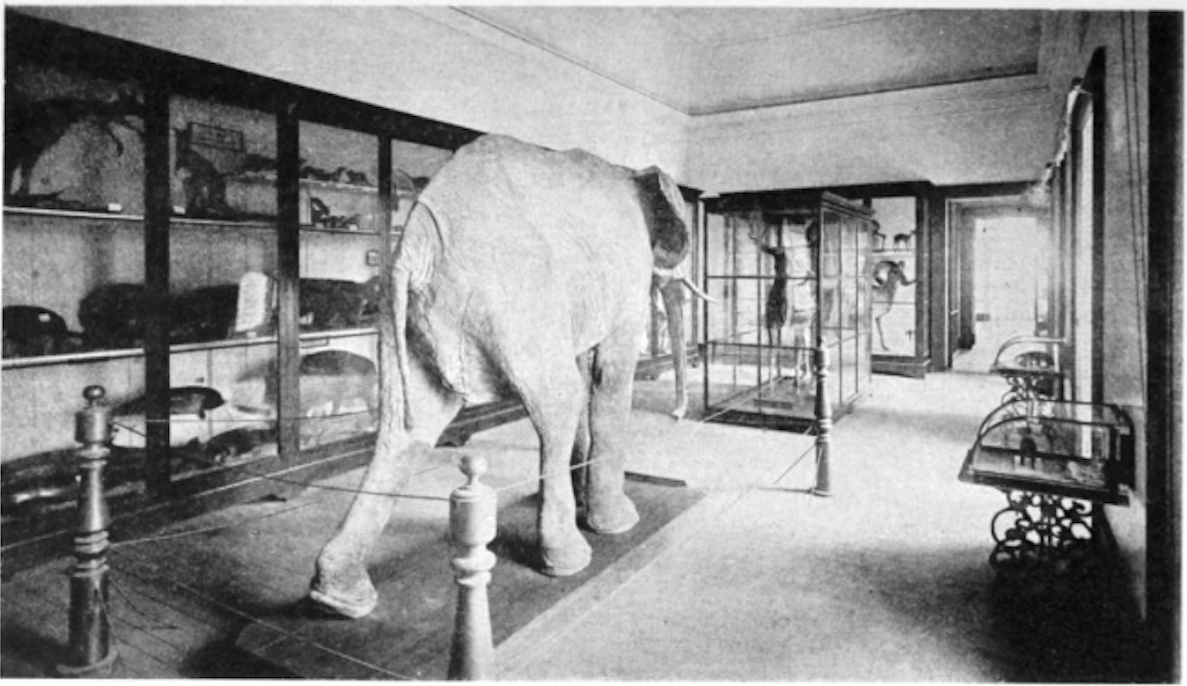
Sala Spix, c. 1905

D. Pedro II was well aware of the shortage of true scientists and naturalists in Brazil. He fixed this problem by inviting foreign scientists to come to work at the museum. The first to come was Ludwig Riedel (1761–1861), a German botanist who had participated in Baron von Langsdorff's famed expedition to Mato Grosso from 1826 to 1828. Other scientists to come were German chemist Theodor Peckolt and American geologist and paleontologist Charles Frederick Hartt (1840–1878). In the following years, the museum gradually became known so it continued to attract several foreign scientists who wished to achieve scientific stature with their work in Brazil, such as Fritz Müller (1821–1897), Hermann von Ihering (1850–1930), Carl August Wilhelm Schwacke (1848–1894), Orville Adalbert Derby (1851–1915), Émil August Goeldi (1859–1917), Louis Couty (1854–1884) and others; all of them were fired by museum director Ladislau Netto when the emperor was deposed.

The emperor was a very popular figure when he was deposed by a military coup in 1889, so the republicans tried to erase the symbols of the empire. One of these symbols, the Paço de São Cristóvão, the official residence of the emperors in the Quinta da Boa Vista, became vacant; therefore, in 1892, the National Museum, with all its collections, valuables and researchers, was transferred to this palace, where it stays until today.

In 1946, the museum's management was passed to the University of Brazil, currently the Federal University of Rio de Janeiro. The researchers and their offices and laboratories occupy a good part of the palace and other buildings erected at Botanical Gardens (Horto Florestal), in the Quinta da Boa Vista park – one of the largest scientific libraries of Rio. The National Museum offers graduate courses in the following areas: anthropology, sociology, botany, geology, paleontology, and zoology.

It was presented as a Lego Idea.

== Former collections ==
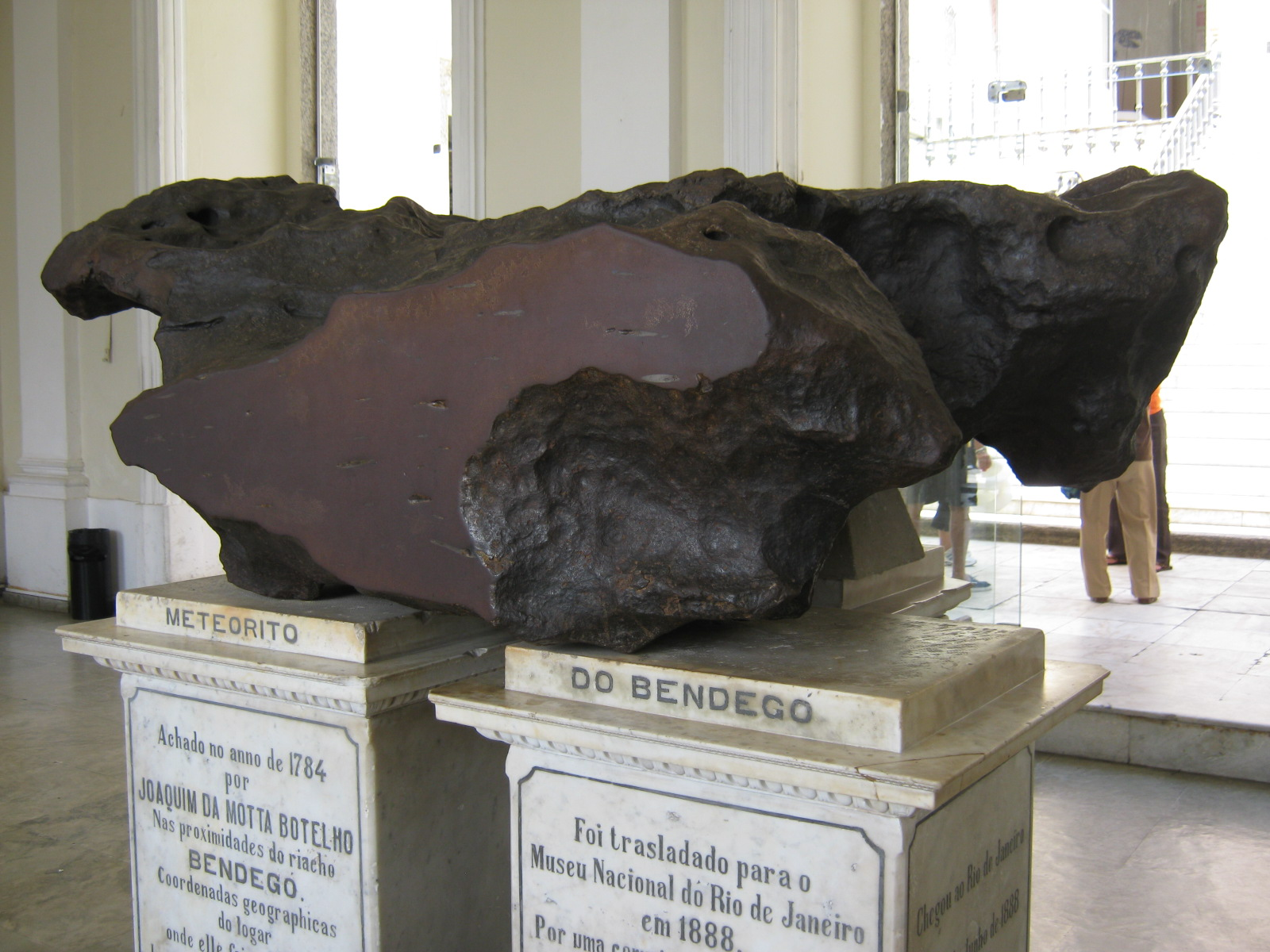
Bendegó meteorite, which survived the fire

The museum sheltered one of the largest exhibits of the Americas, prior to the fire, consisting of animals, insects, minerals, aboriginal collections of utensils, Egyptian mummies and South American archaeological artifacts, meteorites, fossils and many other findings.

One of the meteorites that was on display is the Bendegó meteorite, which weighs over 5,000 kilograms (11,000 lb) and was discovered in 1784.

=== Archaeology ===
The collection of archaeology of the National Museum comprised more than 100,000 objects, covering distinct several civilizations that lived in the Americas, Europe, Africa, and the Middle East, since the Paleolithic Age until the 19th century. The collection is subdivided into four main segments: Ancient Egypt, Mediterranean cultures, Pre-Columbian archaeology, and Pre-Columbian Brazil – last nucleus, systematically gathered since 1867, is the largest segment of the archaeological collection, as well as the most important collection of its typology in the world, covering the history of Pre-Cabraline Brazil in a very comprehensive manner and sheltering some of the most important material records related to Brazilian archaeology. It was, therefore, a collection of considerable scientific value, and object of several works of basic research, theses, dissertations, and monographs.

==== Ancient Egypt ====
With more than 700 items, the collection of Egyptian archaeology of the National Museum was one of the largest of Latin America and one of the oldest in the Americas. Most part of the objects entered the museum collection in 1826, when the tradesman Nicolau Fiengo brought from Marseille an assemblage of Egyptian antiquities that belonged to the famous Italian explorer Giovanni Battista Belzoni, who had been in charge of excavating the Theban Necropolis (modern-day Luxor) and the Temple of Karnak.

This collection had Argentina as the initial destination, and had probably been ordered by the president of that country, Bernardino Rivadavia, creator of the University of Buenos Aires and a noted enthusiast of museums. However, a naval blockade at the La Plata River would impede Fiengo from completing his journey, forcing him to return from Montevideo to Rio de Janeiro, where the pieces were offered at an auction. Emperor Pedro I bought the entire collection for five million réis, and subsequently donated it to the National Museum. It has been suggested that the action of Pedro I would have been influenced by José Bonifácio de Andrada, a relevant early member of Freemasonry in Brazil, perhaps driven by the interest that the organization had for the Egyptian iconography.

The collection started by Pedro I would be expanded by his son, Emperor Pedro II, an amateur Egyptologist and notable collector of archaeological and ethnographic artifacts. One of the most important additions to the Egyptian collection of the National Museum made by Pedro II is the polychromed wood sarcophagus of the singer of Amun, Sha-Amun-en-su, from the Late Period, offered to the emperor as a gift during his second trip to Egypt, in 1876, by the Khedive Ismail Pasha. The sarcophagus is distinguished for its rarity, since it is one of few examples that have never been opened, still preserving the mummy of the singer in its interior. The collection would be enriched through other acquisitions and donations, becoming, at the beginning of the 20th century, sufficiently relevant to draw the attention of international researchers and Egyptologists, such as Alberto Childe, who served as conservator of the Department of Archaeology of the museum between 1912 and 1938 and was also responsible for publishing the Guide of the Collections of Classical Archaeology of the National Museum, in 1919.

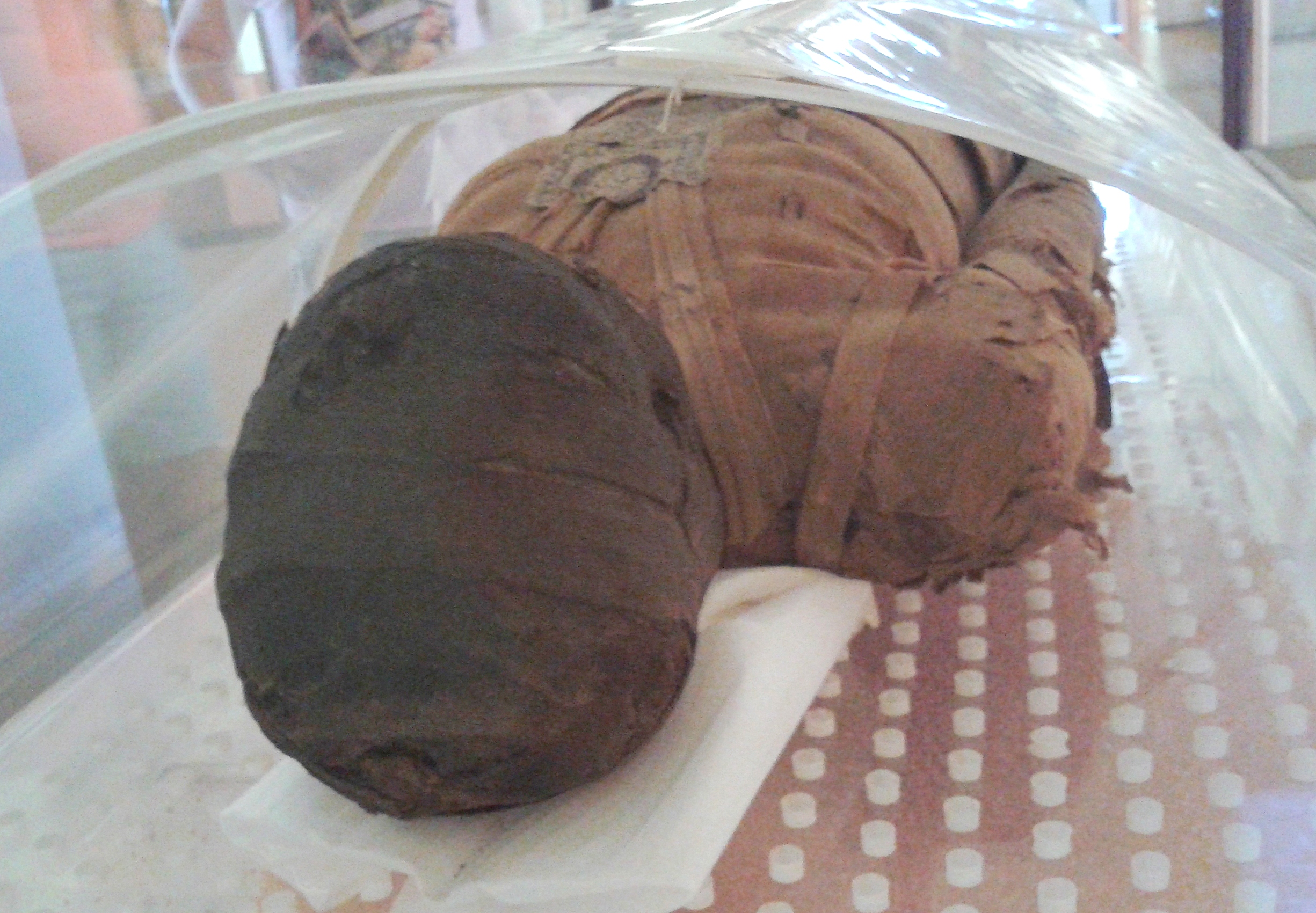
Egyptian mummy ("Princess Kherima"). Roman Period, 1st–3rd centuries AD.

Besides the aforementioned coffin of Sha-Amun-en-su, the museum possesses other three sarcophagi, from the Third Intermediate Period and the Late Era, belonging to three priests of Amun: Hori, Pestjef, and Harsiese. The museum also conserves six human mummies (four adults and two children), as well as a number of mummies and sarcophagi of animals (cats, ibises, fishes, and crocodiles). Among the human examples, the highlight is a mummy of a woman from the Roman Period, which is considered extremely rare for the preparatory technique used, of which there are only eight similar examples worldwide. Called "princess of the Sun" or "princess Kherima", the mummy has her members and fingers of the hands and feet individually swaddled and is richly adorned, with painted strips. "Princess Kherima" is one of the most popular items of the National Museum collection, being even related to accounts of parapsychological experiences and collective trances, that supposedly occurred in the 1960s. "Kherima" also inspired the romance The Secret of the Mummy by Everton Ralph, member of the Rosicrucian society.

The collection of votive and funerary steles is composed of dozens of pieces dated, in their majority, from the Intermediate Period and the Late Era. The steles of Raia and Haunefer, which are graved with titles of Semitic origins present in the Bible and in the tablets of Mari, stand out, as well as an unfinished stele, attributed to the emperor Tiberius, of the Roman Period. The museum also had a vast collection of shabtis, i.e. statuettes representing funerary servers, including a group of pieces that belonged to pharaoh Seti I, excavated from his tomb at the Valley of the Kings. The rare artifacts included a limestone statue of a young woman, dated of the New Kingdom, carrying a conic ointment vessel on the top of her head – an iconography that is almost exclusively found among paintings and reliefs. The collection also includes fragments of reliefs, masks, statues of deities in bronze, stone and wood (such as representations of Ptah-Sokar-Osiris), canopic jars, alabaster bowls, funerary cones, jewels, and amulets.

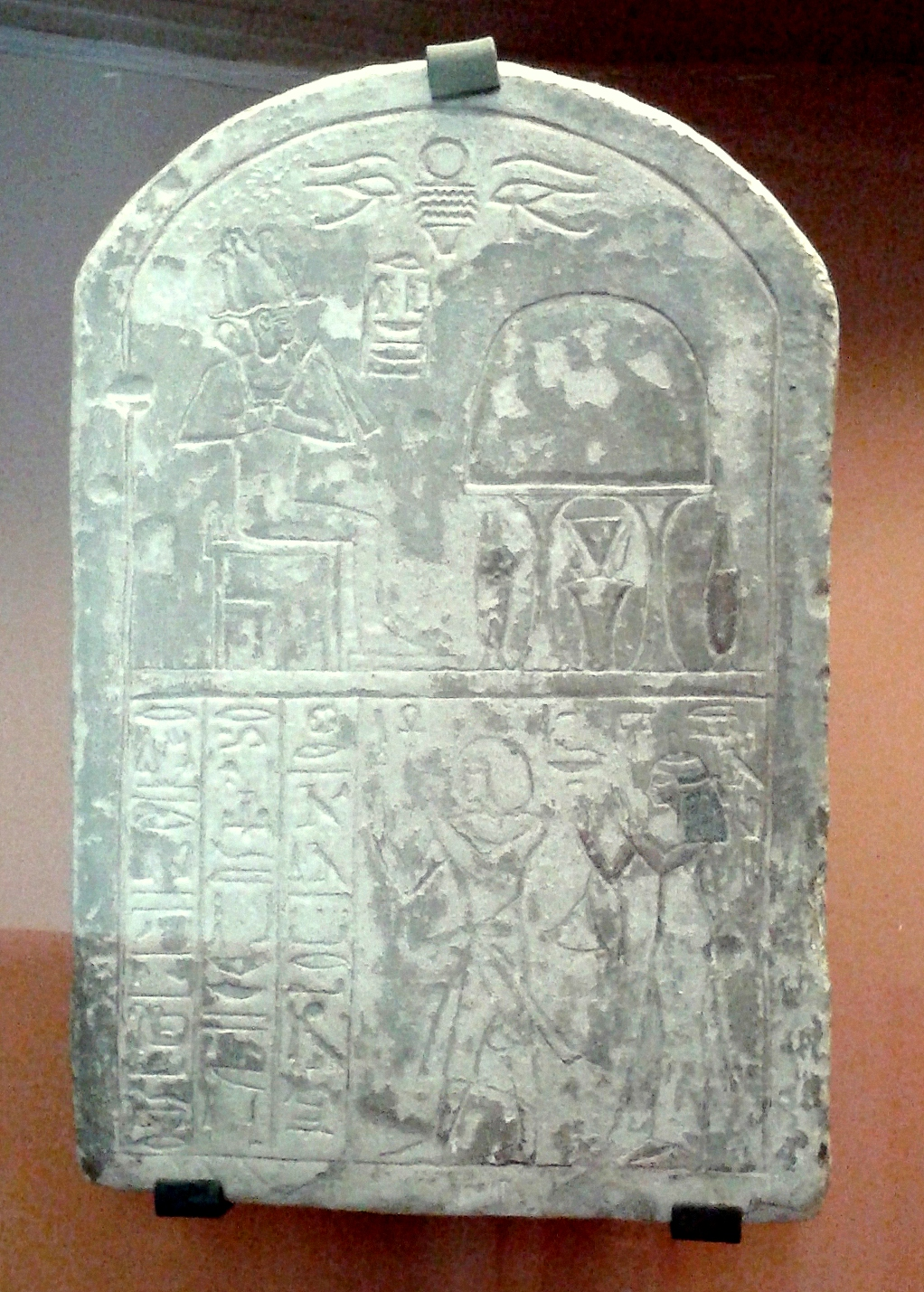
Stele of Raia. New Kingdom, XIX Dynasty, c. 1300–1200 BC

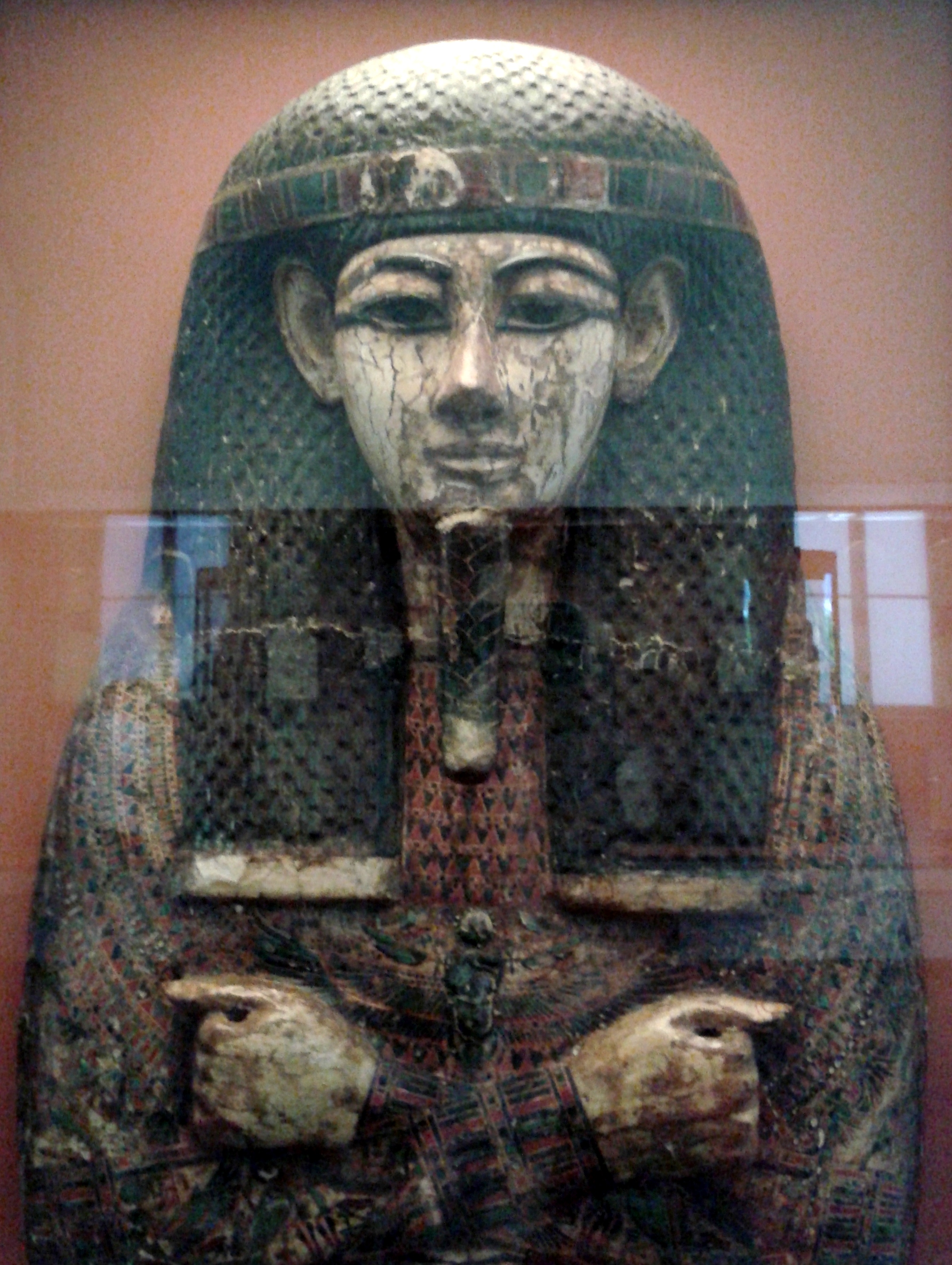
Sarcophagus of Hori. Third Intermediate Period, XXI Dynasty, c. 1049–1026 BC.

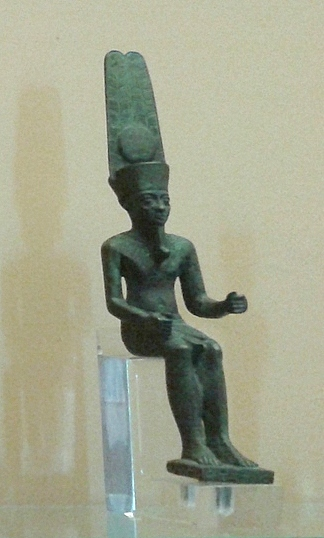
Bronze statuette of Amun.

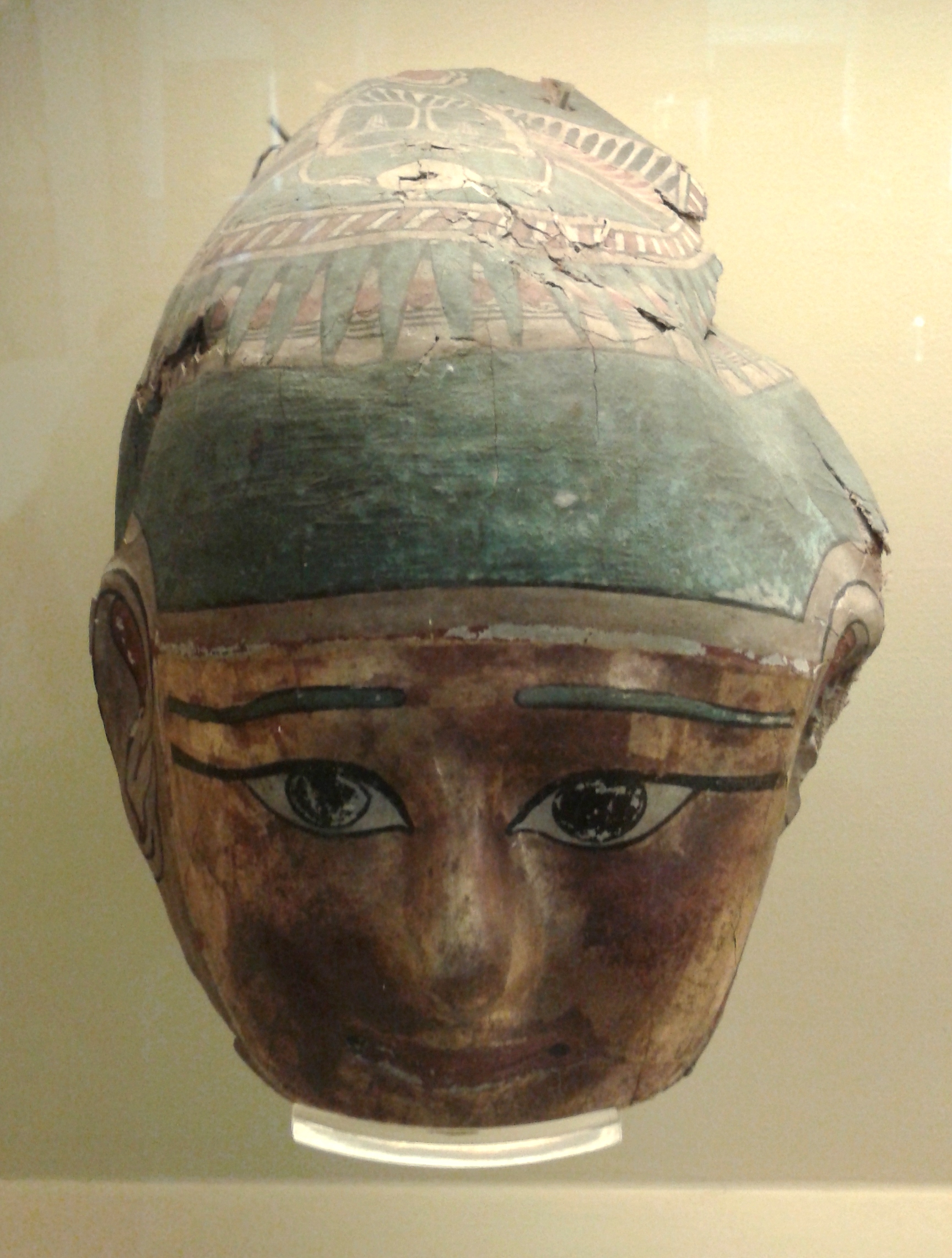
Golden mask. Ptolemaic Kingdom, c. 304 BC.

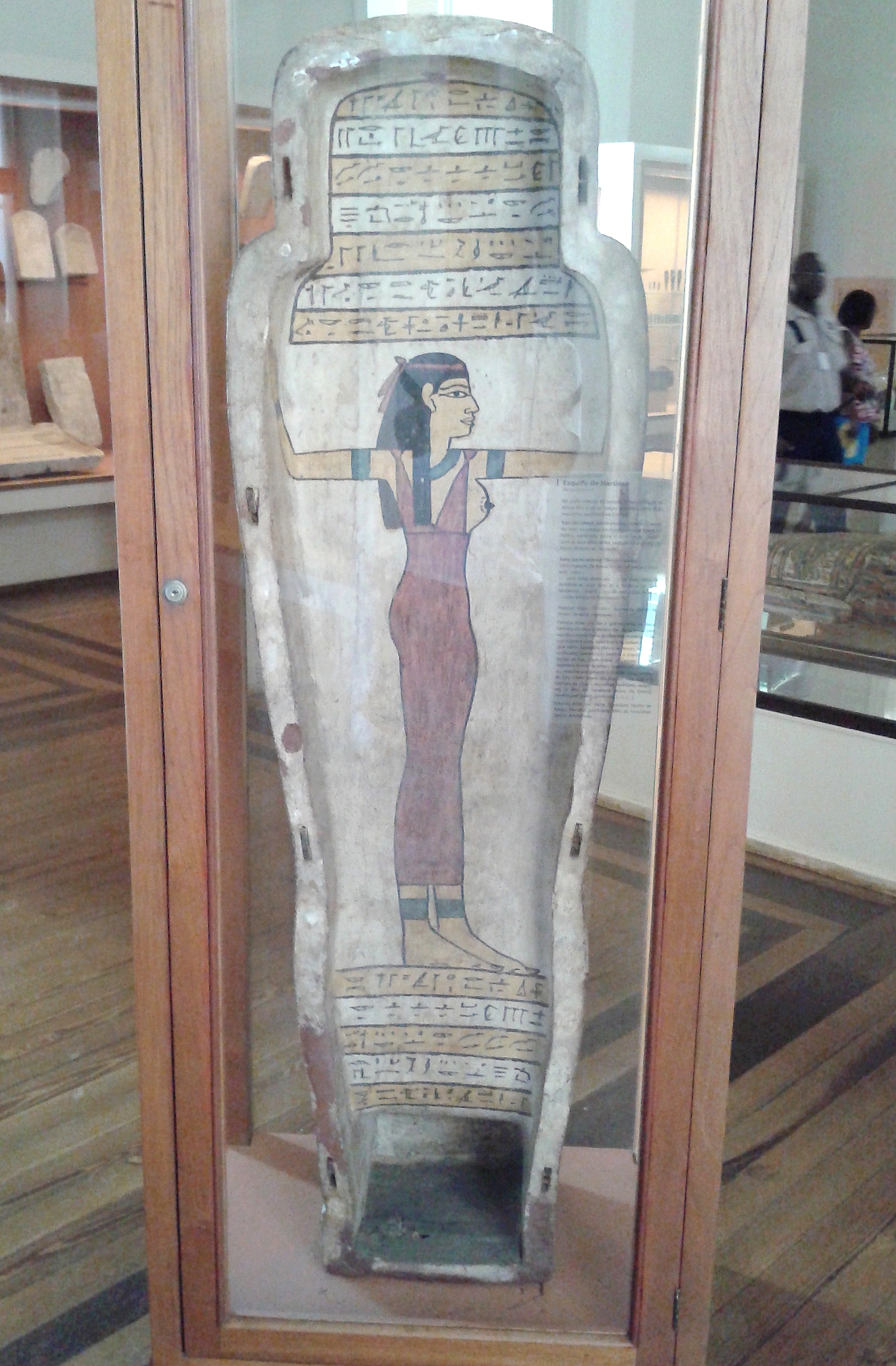
Harsiese Sarcophagus interior

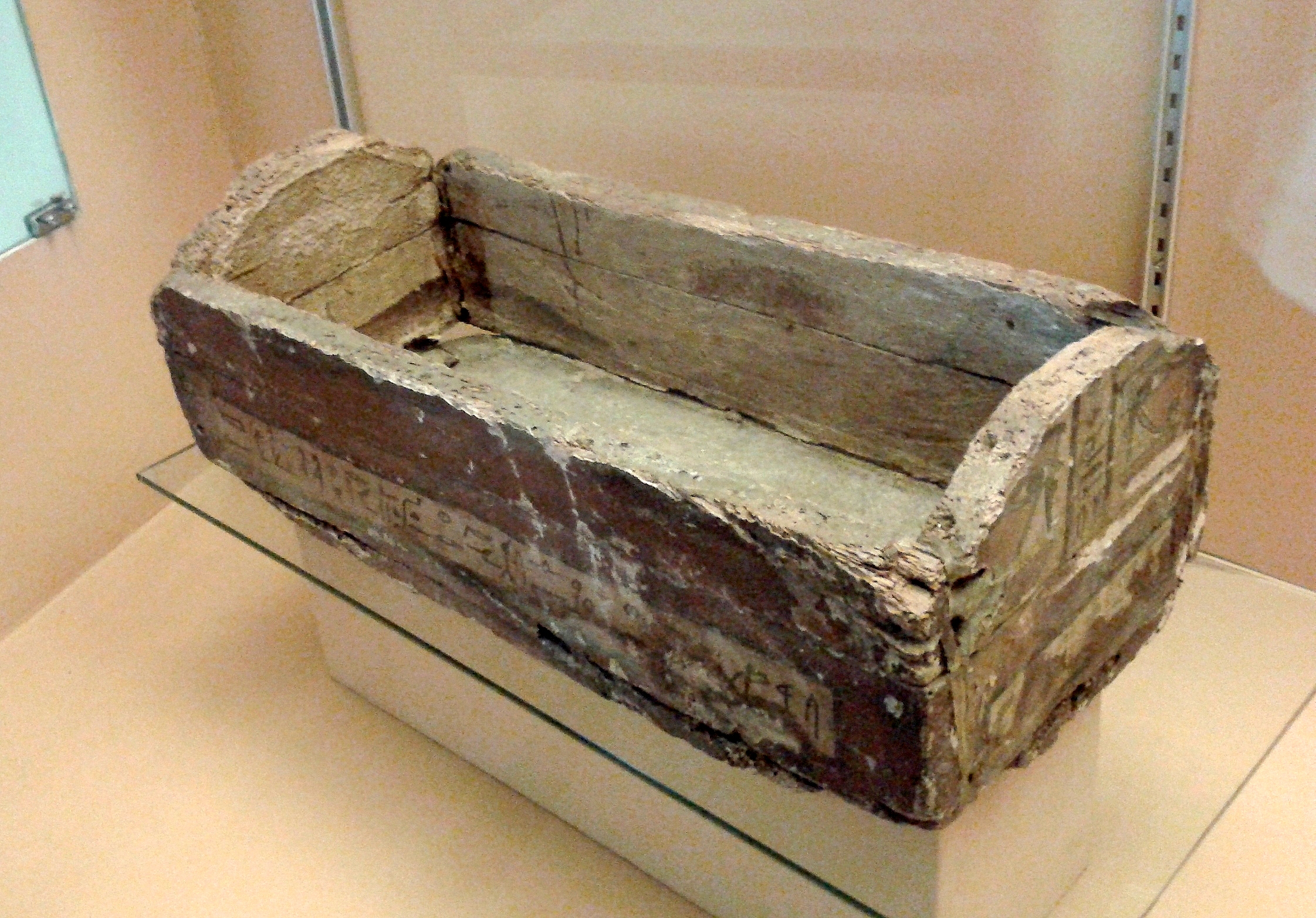
Cat Sarcophagus

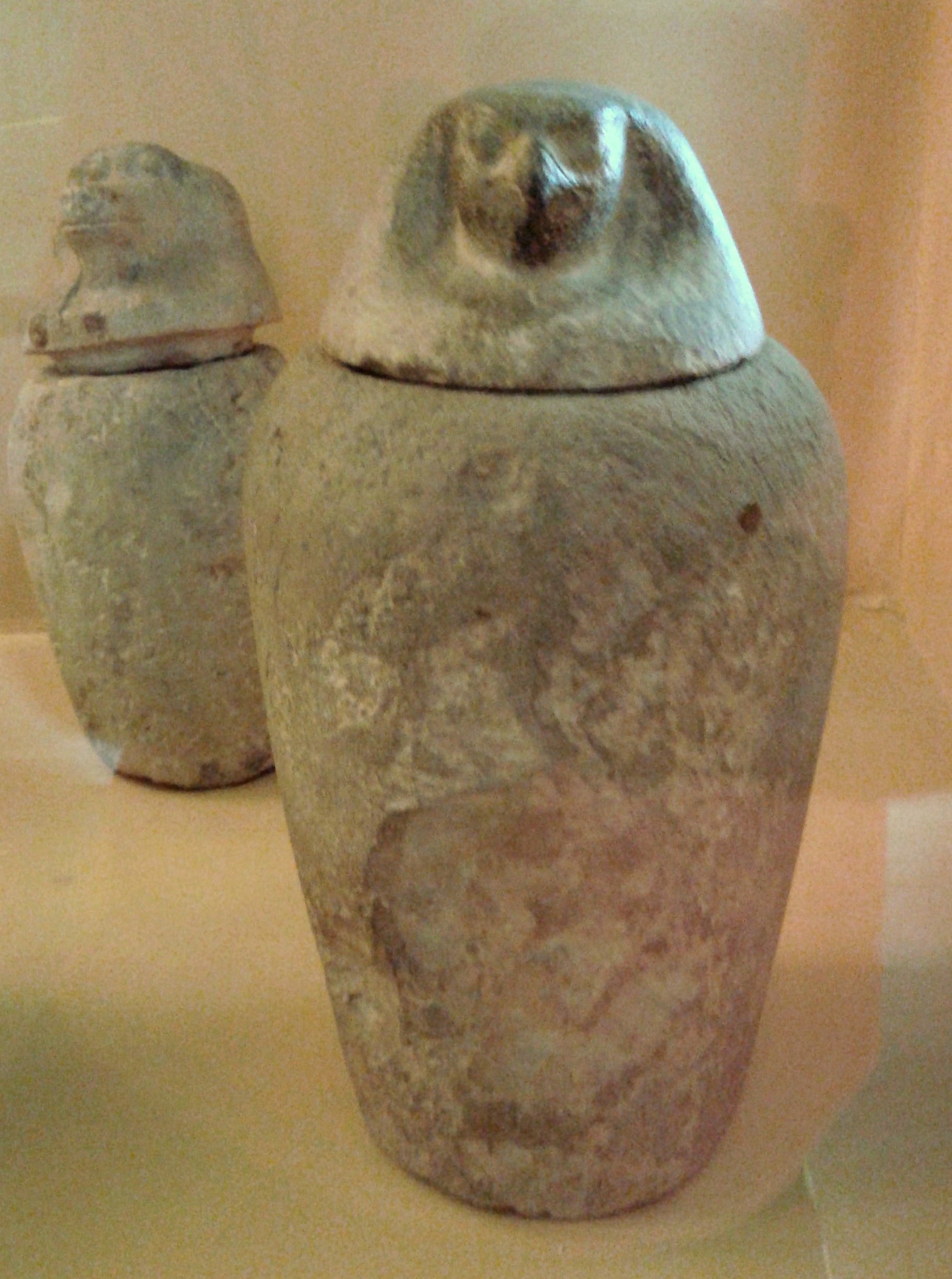
Canopic jar

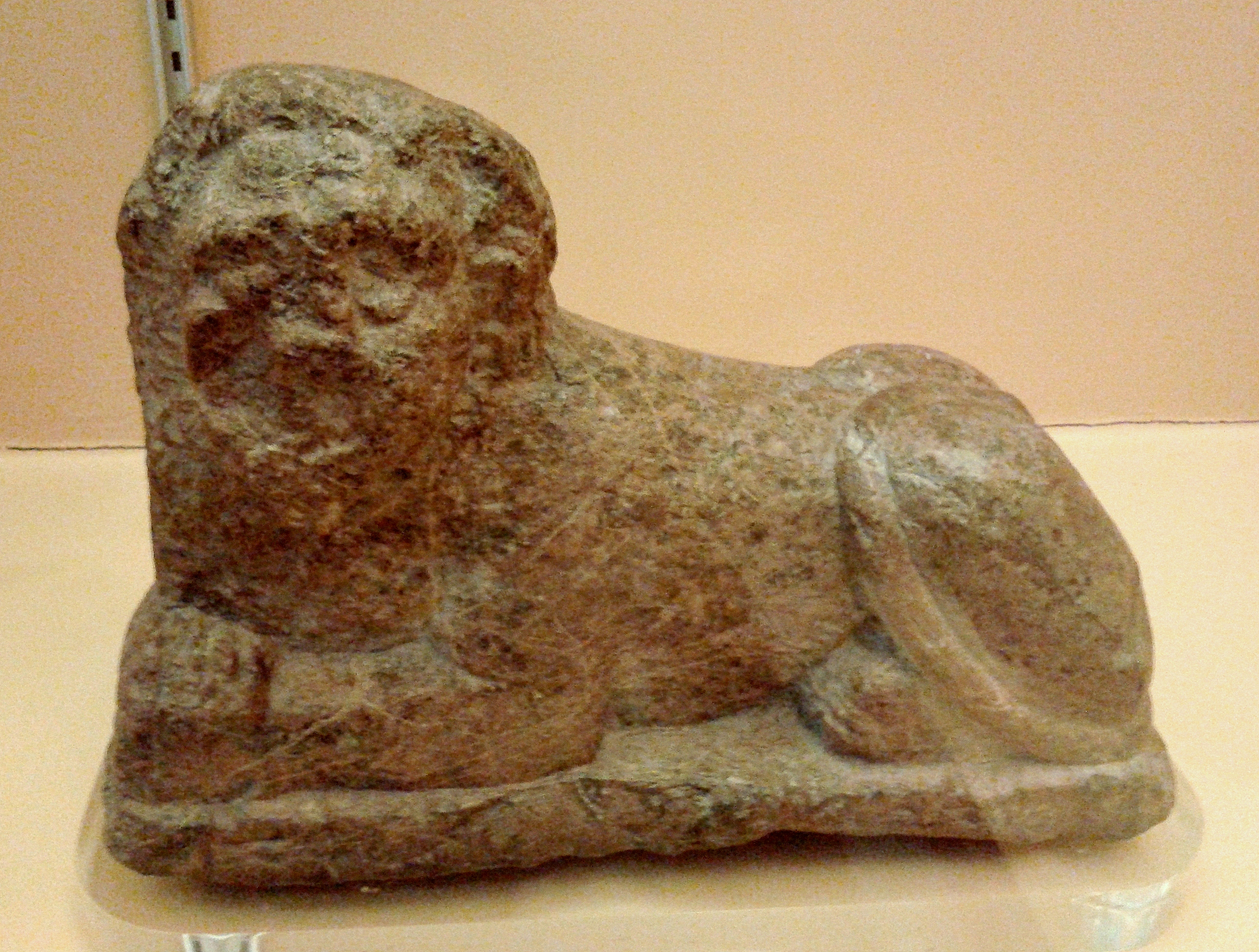
Lion figure

==== Mediterranean cultures ====
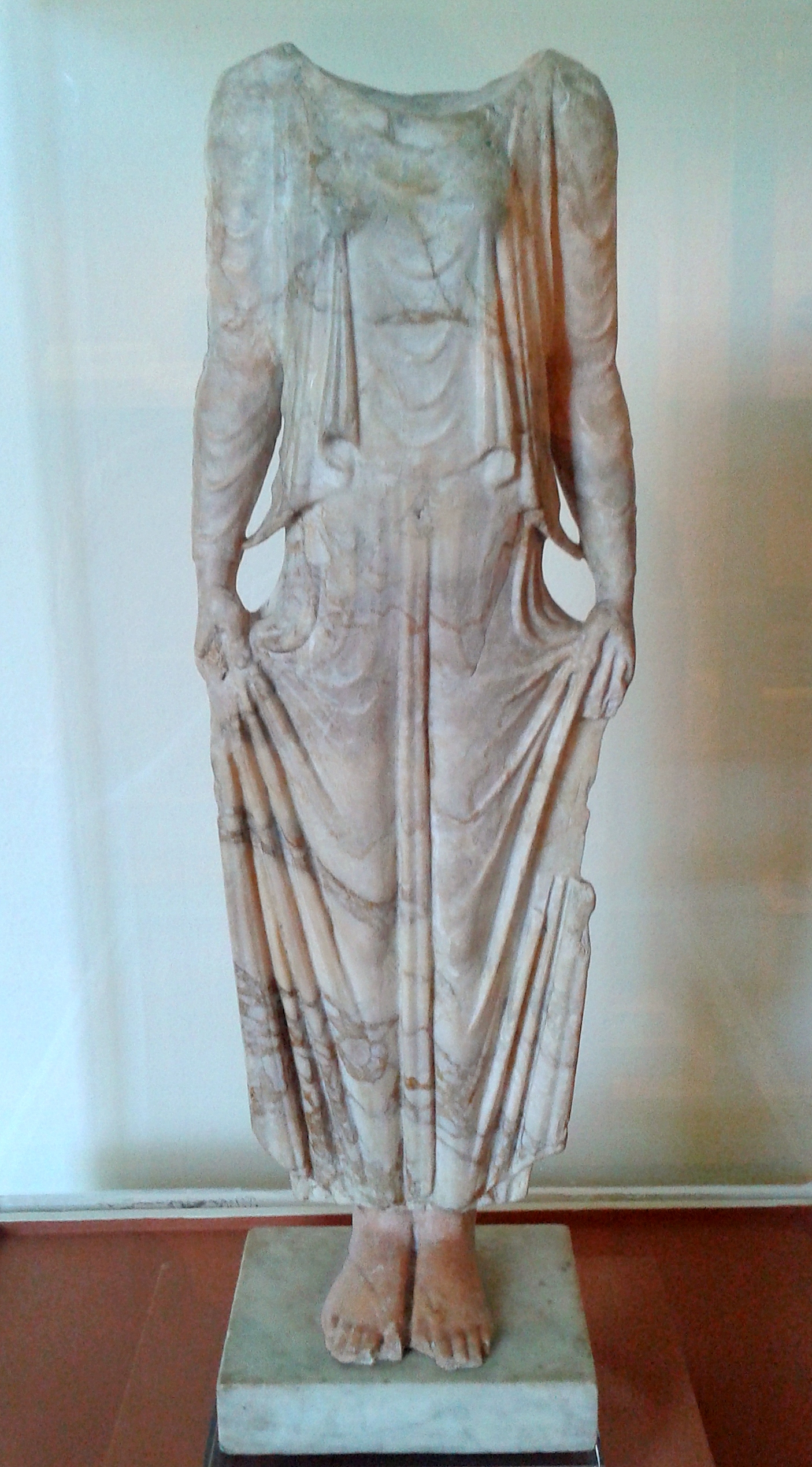
Kore statuette, sculpted in marble. Greek civilization, c. 5th century BC.

The collection of classical archaeology of the National Museum added up to around 750 pieces and consists mostly of Greek, Roman, Etruscan, and Italiote objects, being the largest collection of its kind in Latin America. Most of the pieces previously belonged to the Greco-Roman collection of empress Teresa Cristina, who had been interested in archaeology since her youth. When the empress disembarked in Rio de Janeiro in 1843, right after her proxy wedding to Emperor Pedro II, she brought an assemblage of antiquities found during the excavations of Herculaneum and Pompeii, the Ancient Roman cities destroyed by the eruption of Mount Vesuvius in 79 AD. Part of this collection had also belonged to Carolina Murat, sister of Napoleon Bonaparte and queen consort of the king of Naples, Joachim Murat.

In turn, Ferdinand II of the Two Sicilies, brother of empress Teresa Cristina, had ordered the excavations of Herculaneum and Pompeii, initiated in the 18th century, be resumed. The recovered pieces were sent to the Royal Bourbon Museum of Naples. Aiming to increase the number of classical artifacts in Brazil with a view to the future creation of a museum of Greco-Roman archaeology in the country, the empress established formal exchanges with the Kingdom of Naples. She requested the shipment of Greco-Roman objects to Rio de Janeiro, while sending artifacts of indigenous origins to Italy. The empress also personally financed excavations in Veios, an Etruscan archeological site located fifteen kilometers north of Rome, thus enabling a large part of the objects found there to be brought to Brazil. A greater part of those had been gathered between 1853 and 1859, but Teresa Cristina continued to enrich the collection until the fall of the Brazilian empire in 1889, when the Republic was proclaimed and the empress left the country with all the royal family.

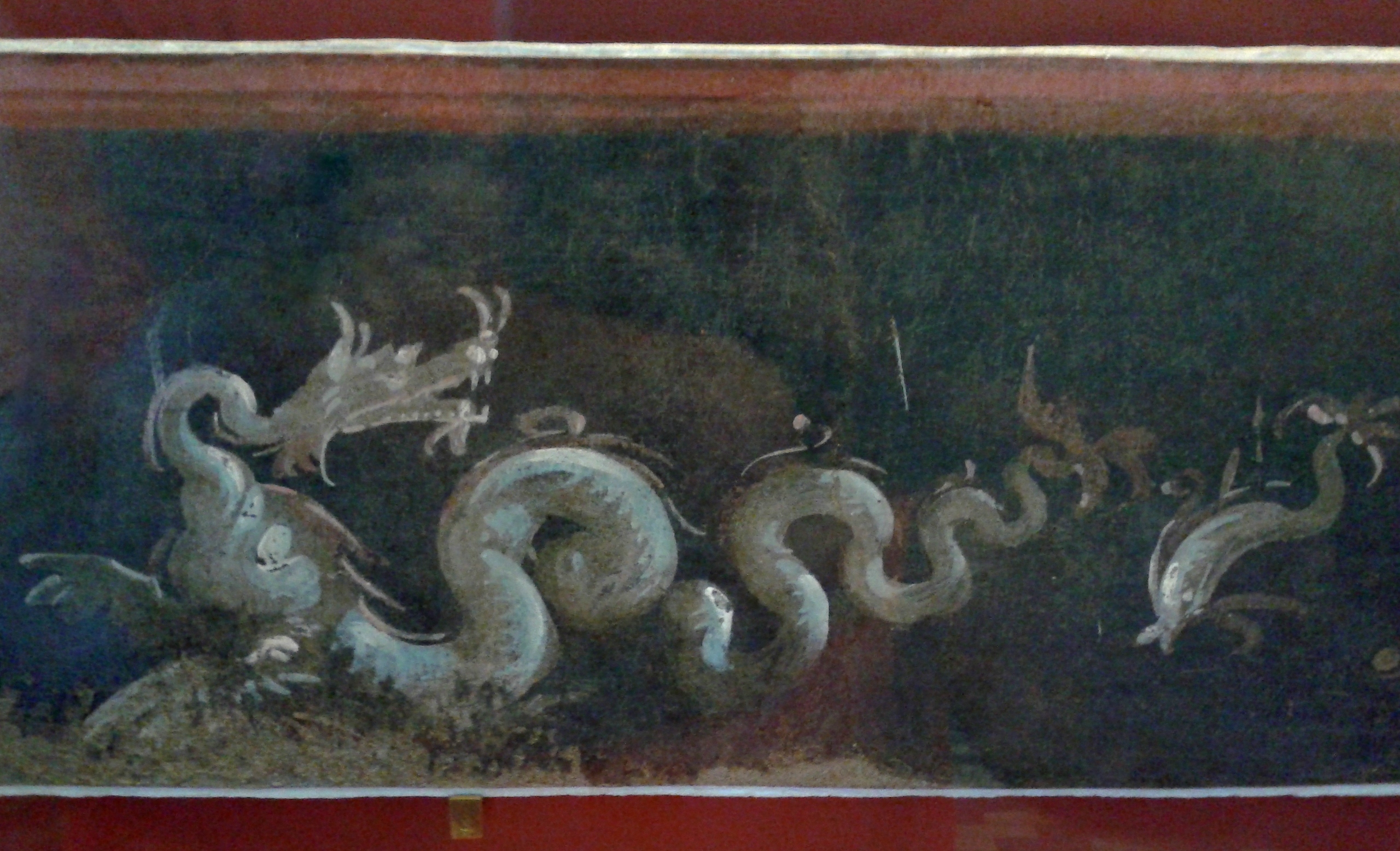
Detail of a fresco from the Temple of Isis, representing a sea dragon and a dolphin, 1st century AD (Fourth Style)

Among the highlights of the collection were a set of four frescos from Pompeii, made around the 1st century AD. Two of those are decorated with marine motifs, respectively depicting a sea dragon and a seahorse as the central figure surrounded by dolphins, and had adorned the lower walls of the room of the devotees at the Temple of Isis. The other two frescos are decorated with representations of plants, birds, and landscapes, stylistically close to the paintings of Herculaneum and Stabiae. The museum also housed a large number of objects from Pompeii portraying the daily life of Ancient Roman citizens: fibulae, jewels, mirrors, and other pieces of the Roman female toilette, glass and bronze vessels, phallic amulets, oil lamps molded in terracotta, etc.

The collection of Mediterranean pottery comprised more than dozens of objects and is noted for the diversity of origins, shapes, decorations and utilitarian purposes. Several of the most important styles and schools of classical antiquity are represented, from the Corinthian geometric style of the 7th century BC to the Roman terracotta amphoras of the Early Christian era. The museum houses examples of kraters, oenochoai, kantharos, chalices, kyathos, cups, hydriai, lekythoi, askoi, and lekanides. The groups of Etruscan Bucchero pottery (7th–4th centuries BC), Greek black-figure vases (7th–5th centuries BC), Gnathian vessels (4th century BC), and the vast set of Italian red-figure vases, with ceramics from Apulia, Campania, Lucania and Magna Graecia, which also stand out.

The collection of sculptures comprised a large number of Tanagra figurines, small terracotta sculptures of Greek origin that were widely appreciated in the Ancient world, as well as a group of Etruscan bronze statuettes representing warriors and female figures. The collection of military artifacts included entire pieces or fragments of helmets, maces, scabbards, bronze blades, brooches and phalleras.

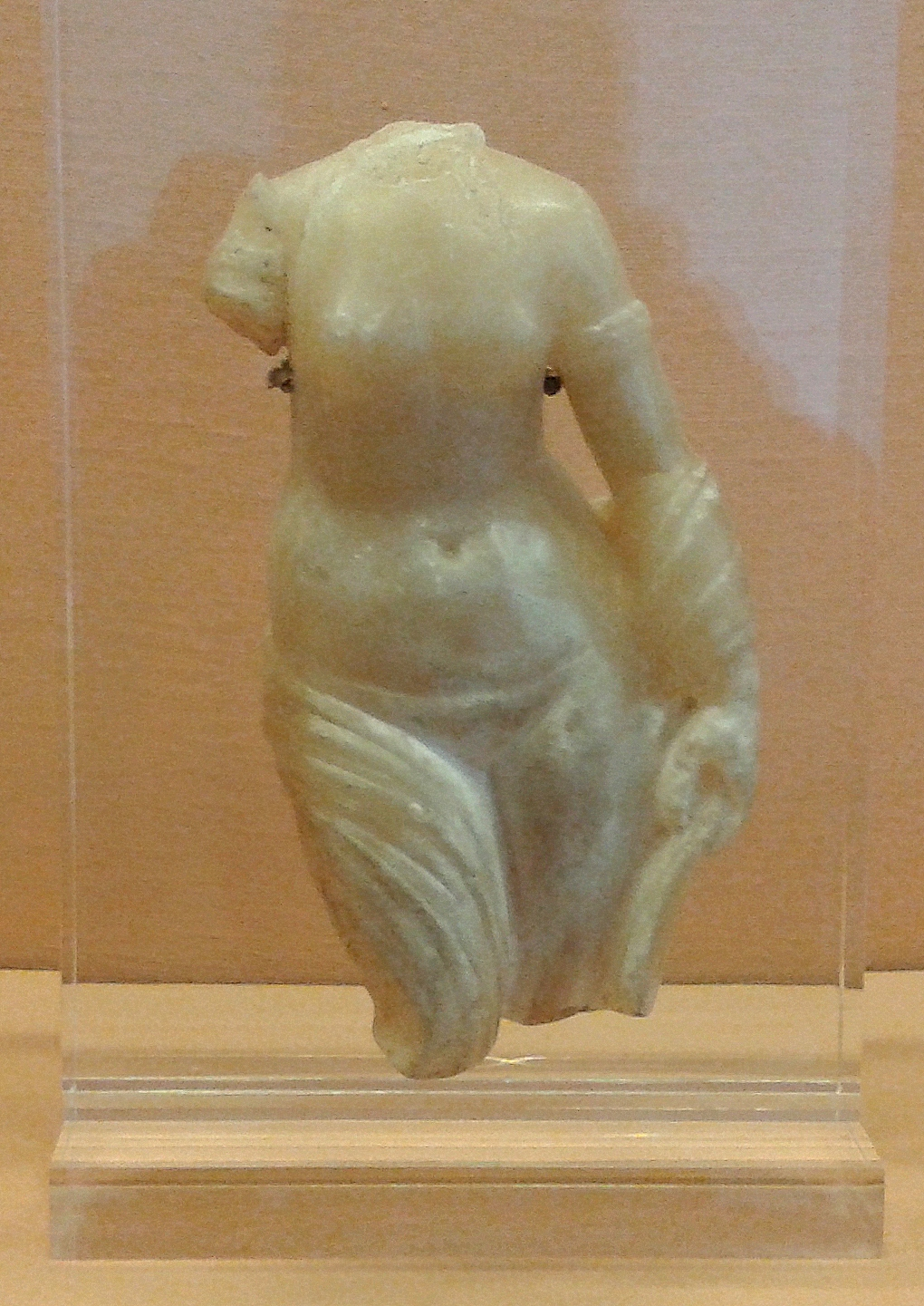
Venus or Leda. Alabaster sculpture, Hellenistic.

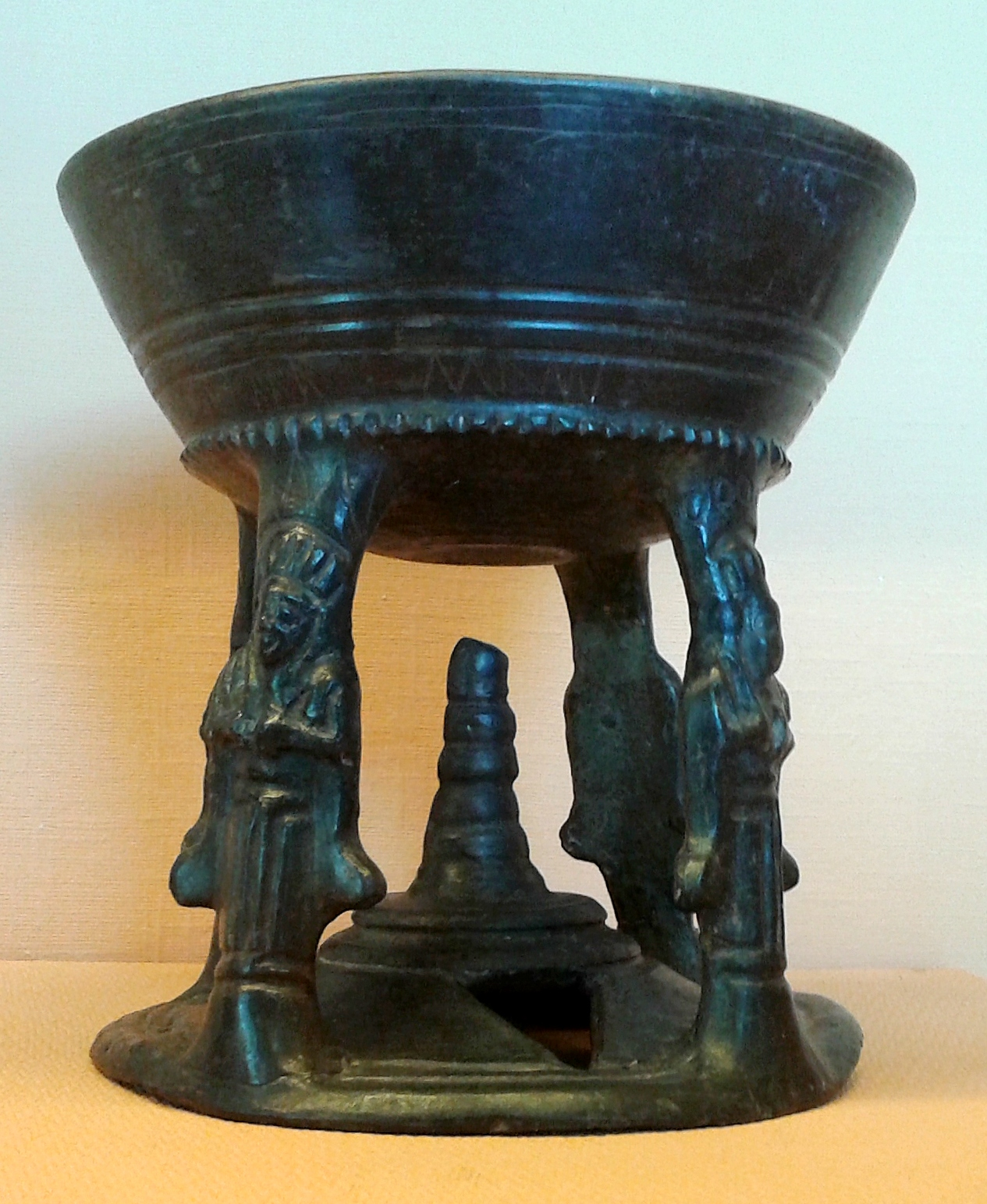
Etruscan caryatid chalice, c. 620–560 BC

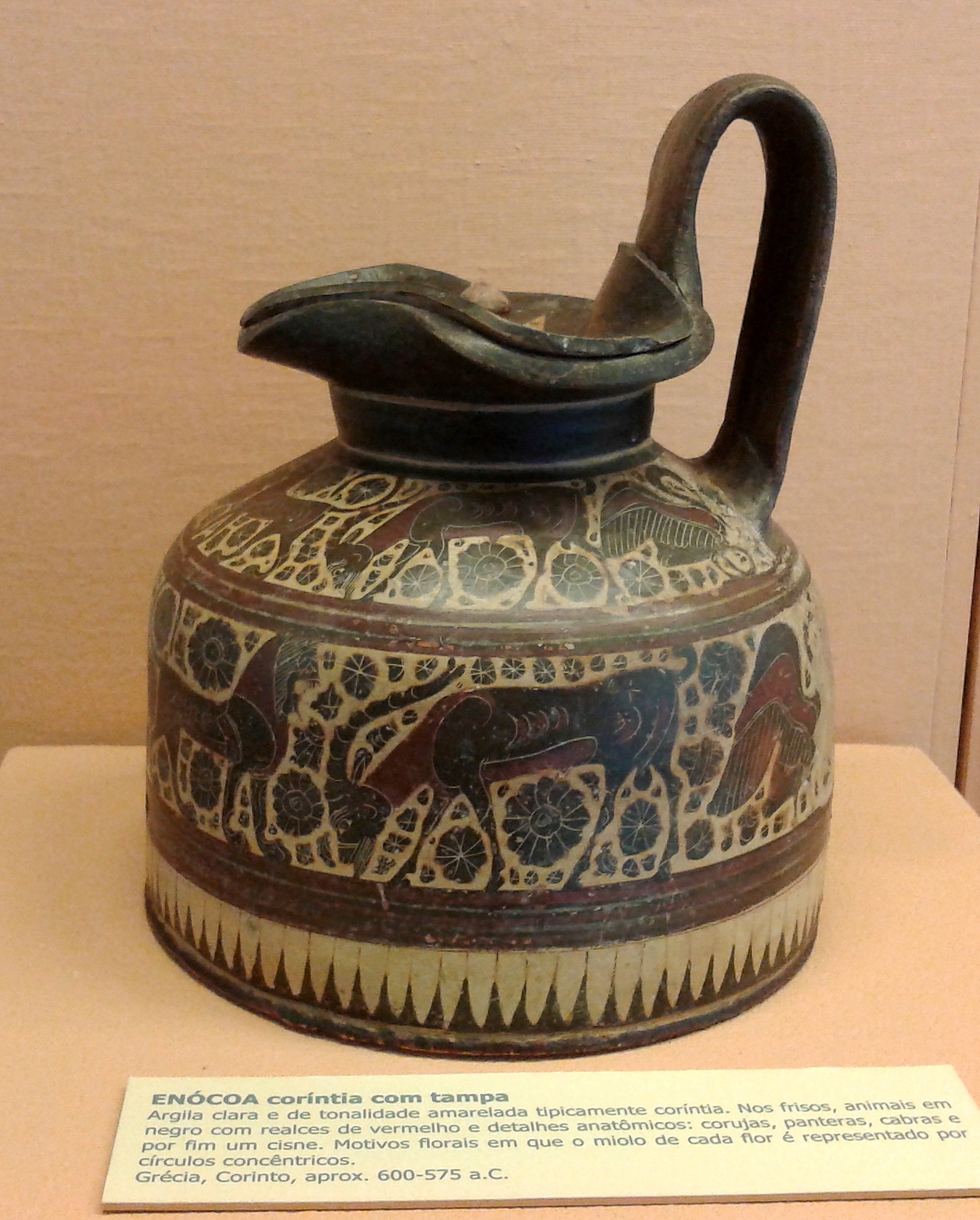
Corinthian oinochoe with lid, c. 600–575 BC

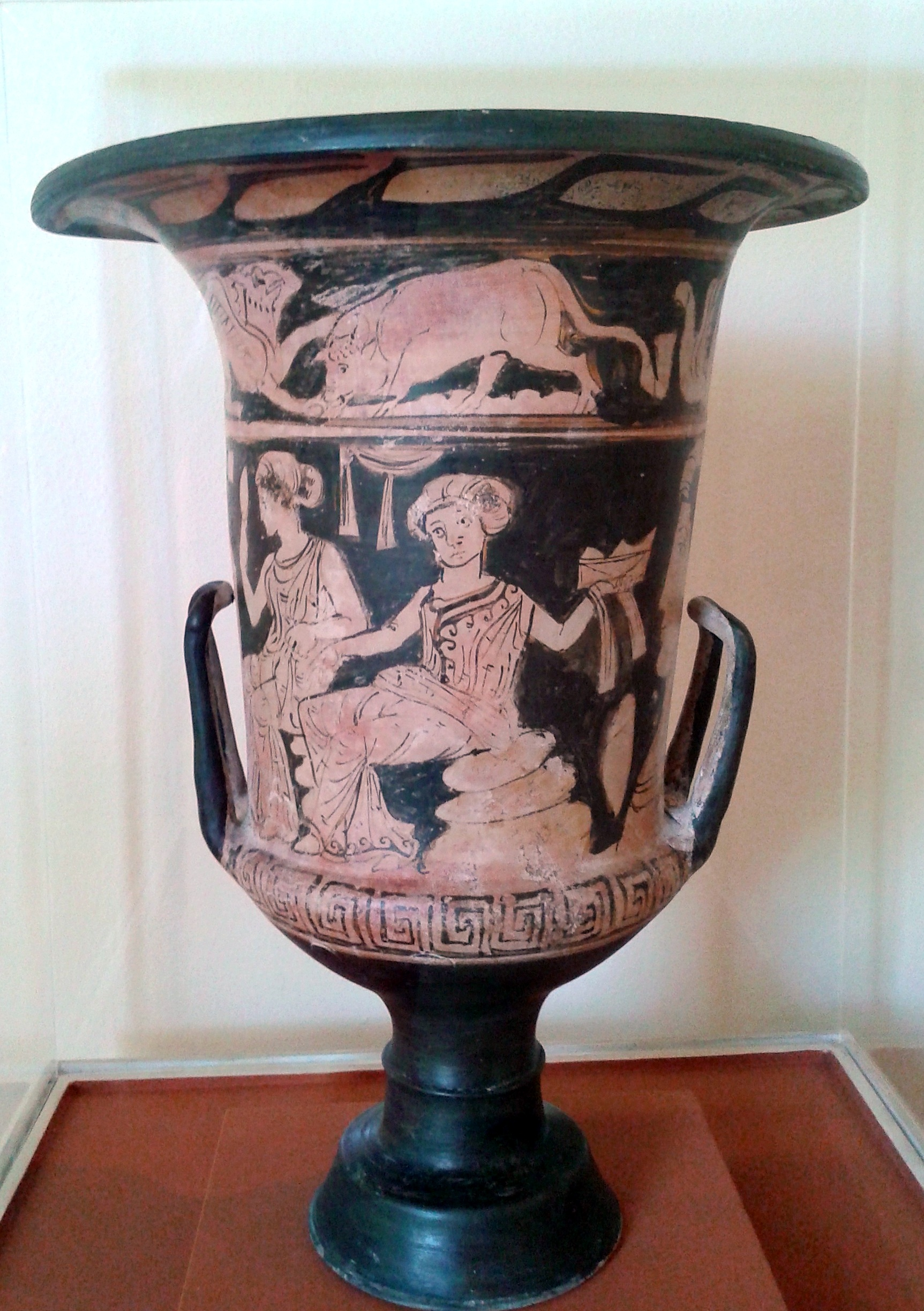
Campanian Red-figure chalice krater, late 4th century BC

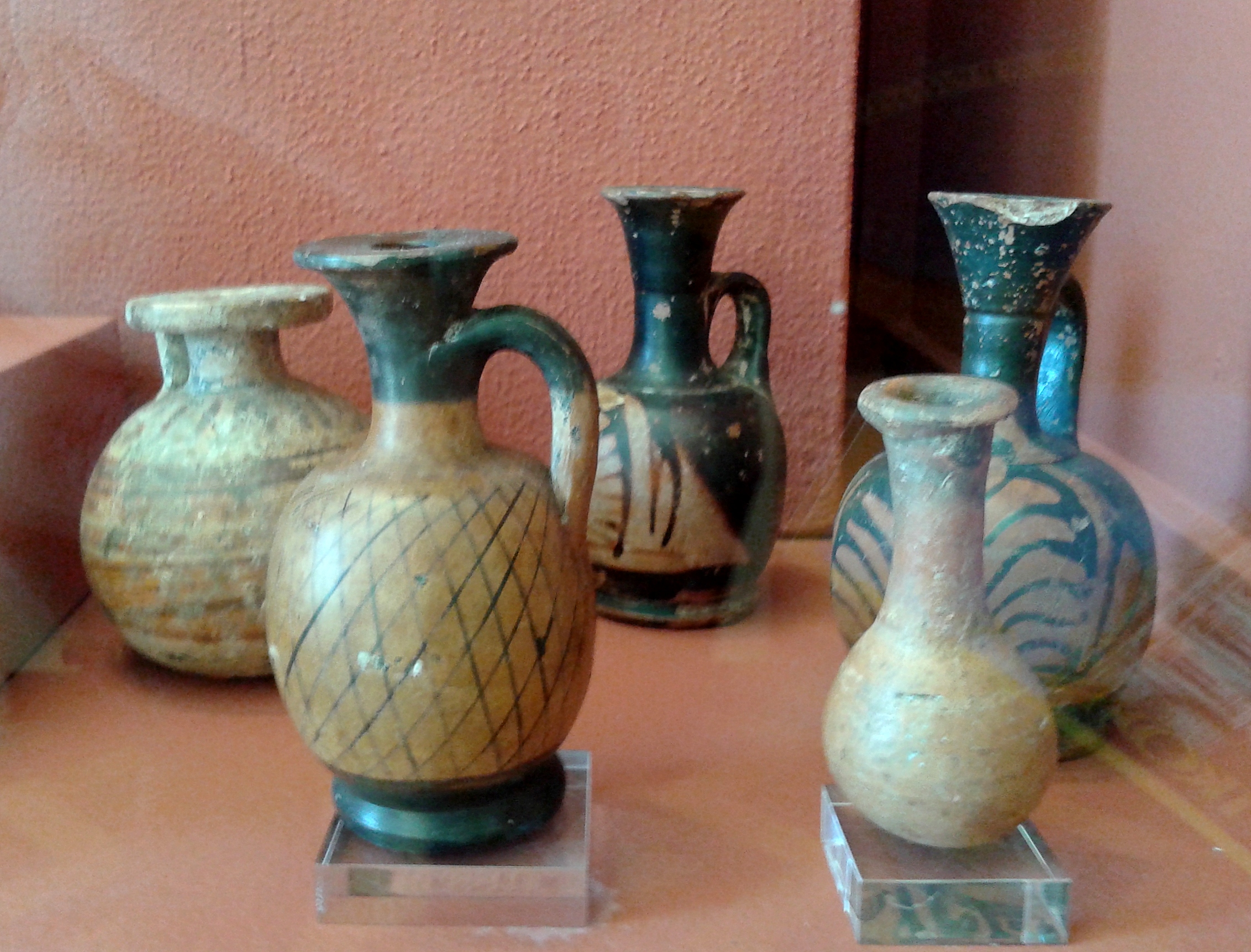
Vases

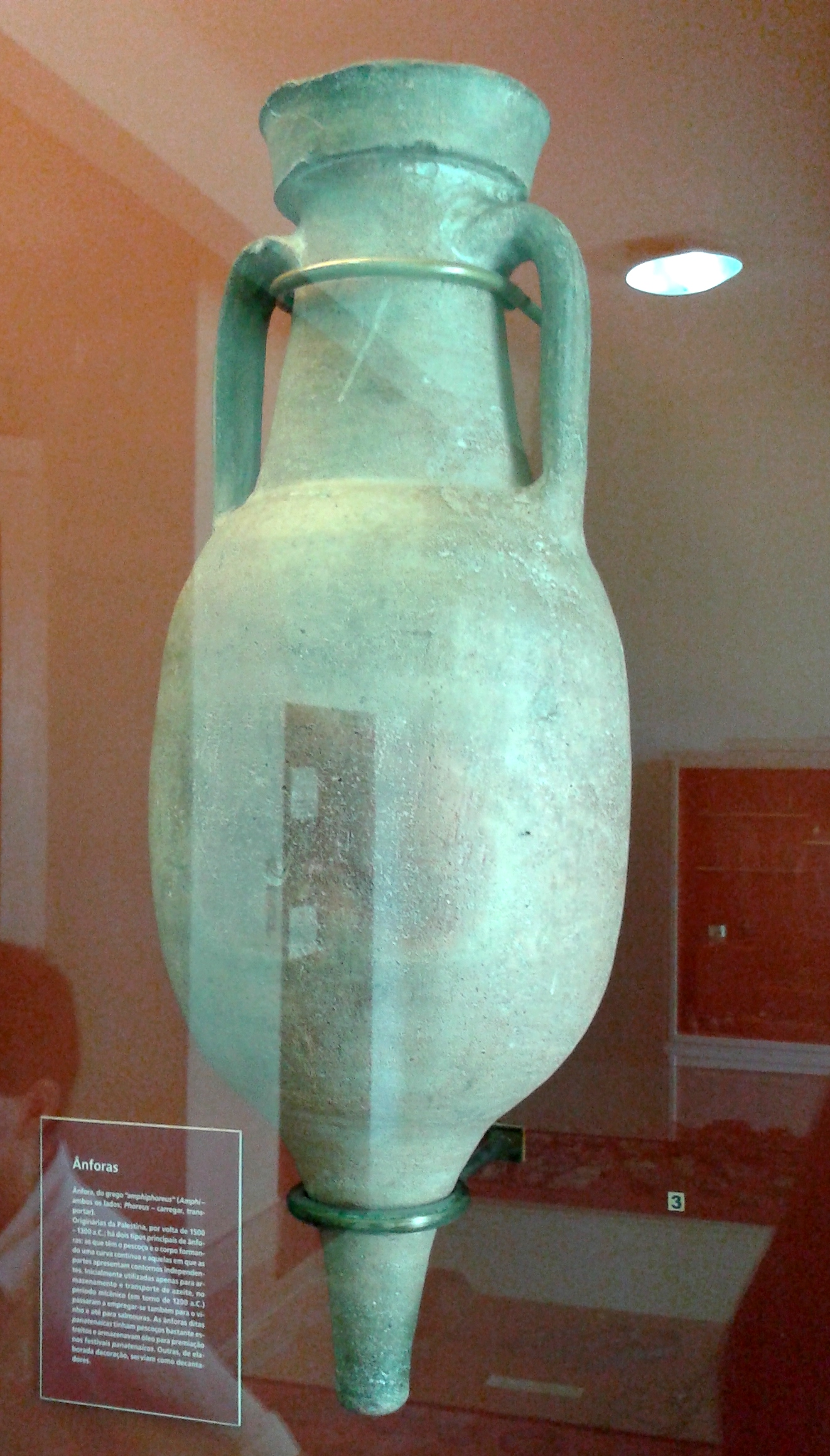
wine amphora

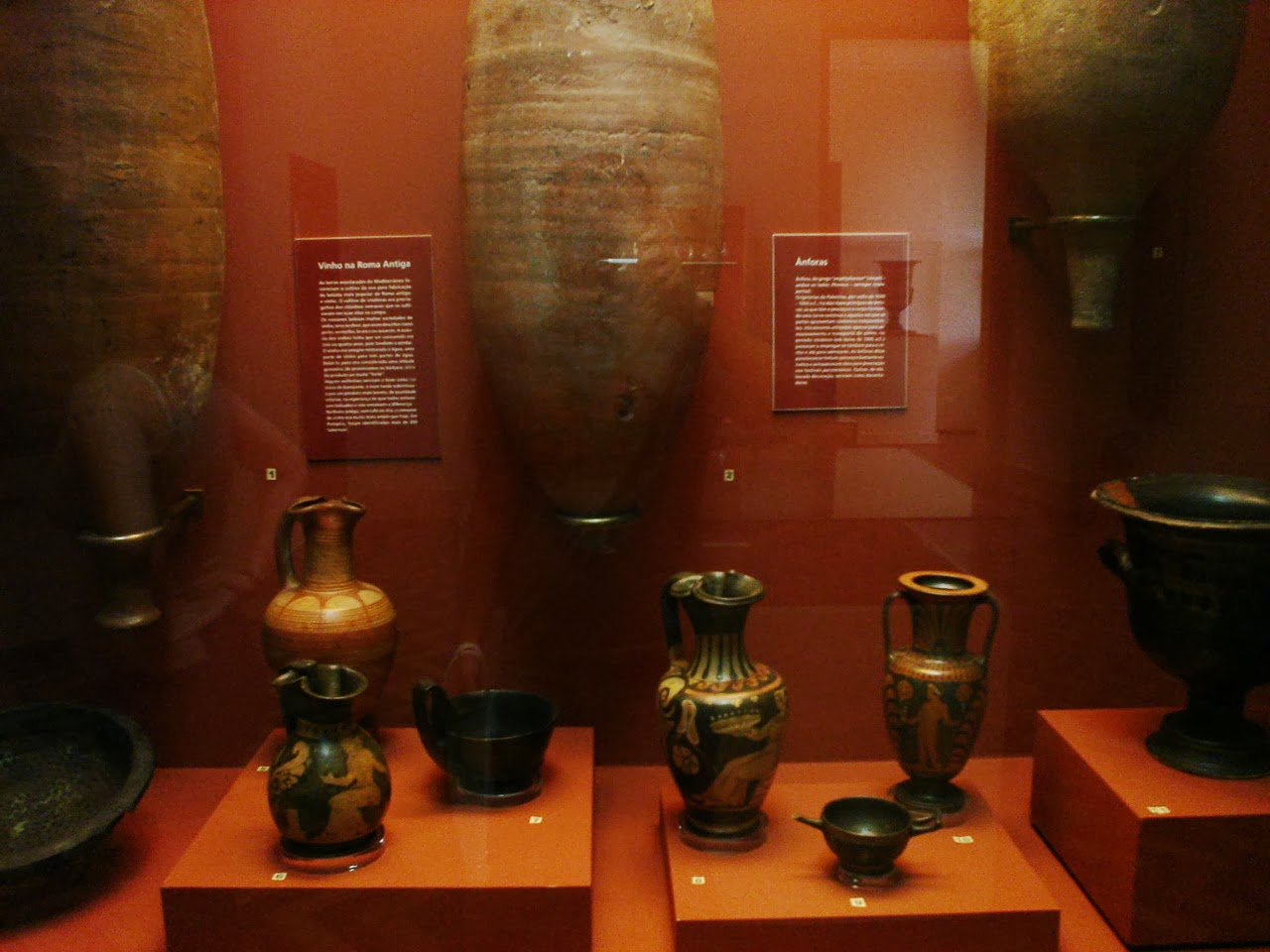
Amphora

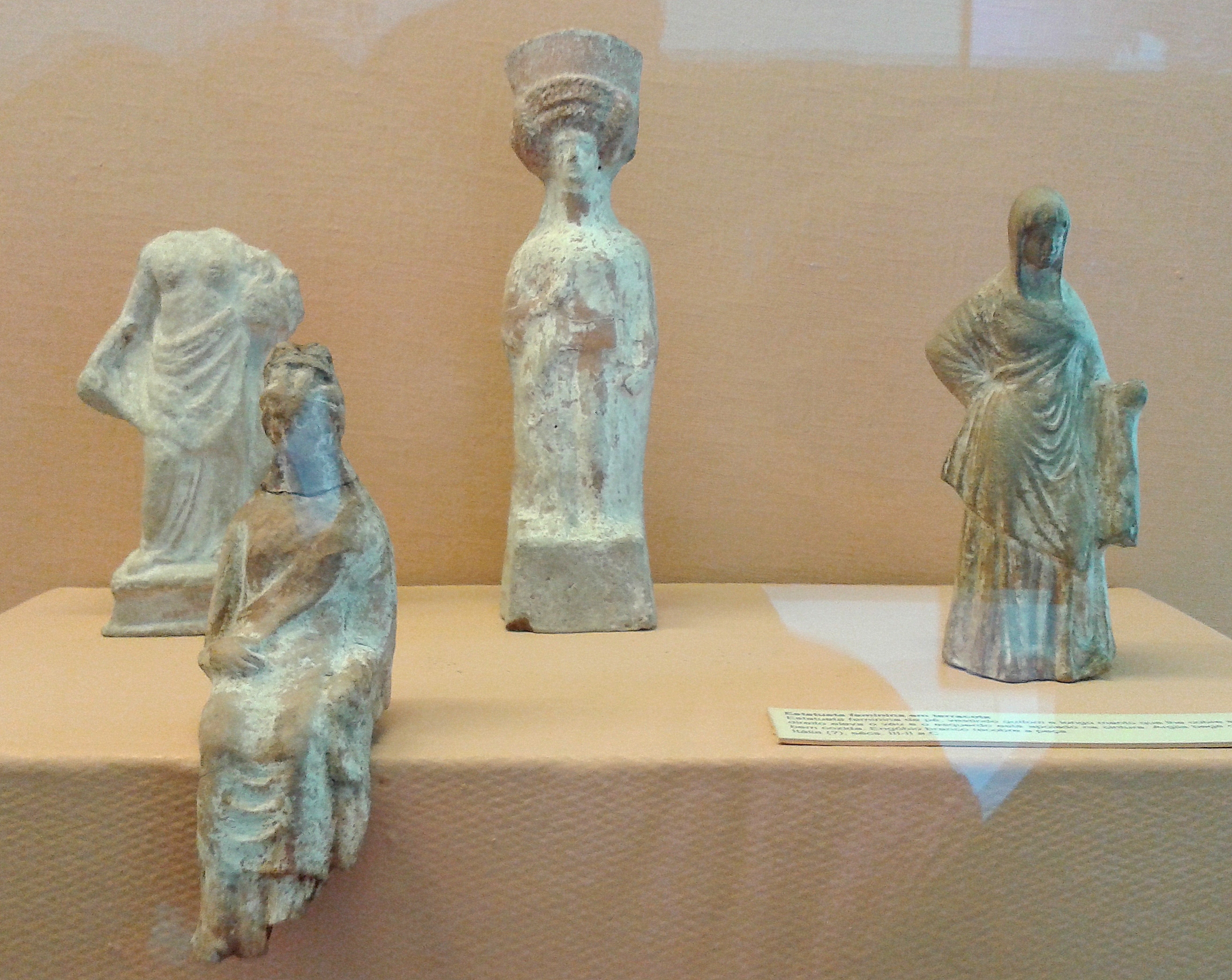
Statues

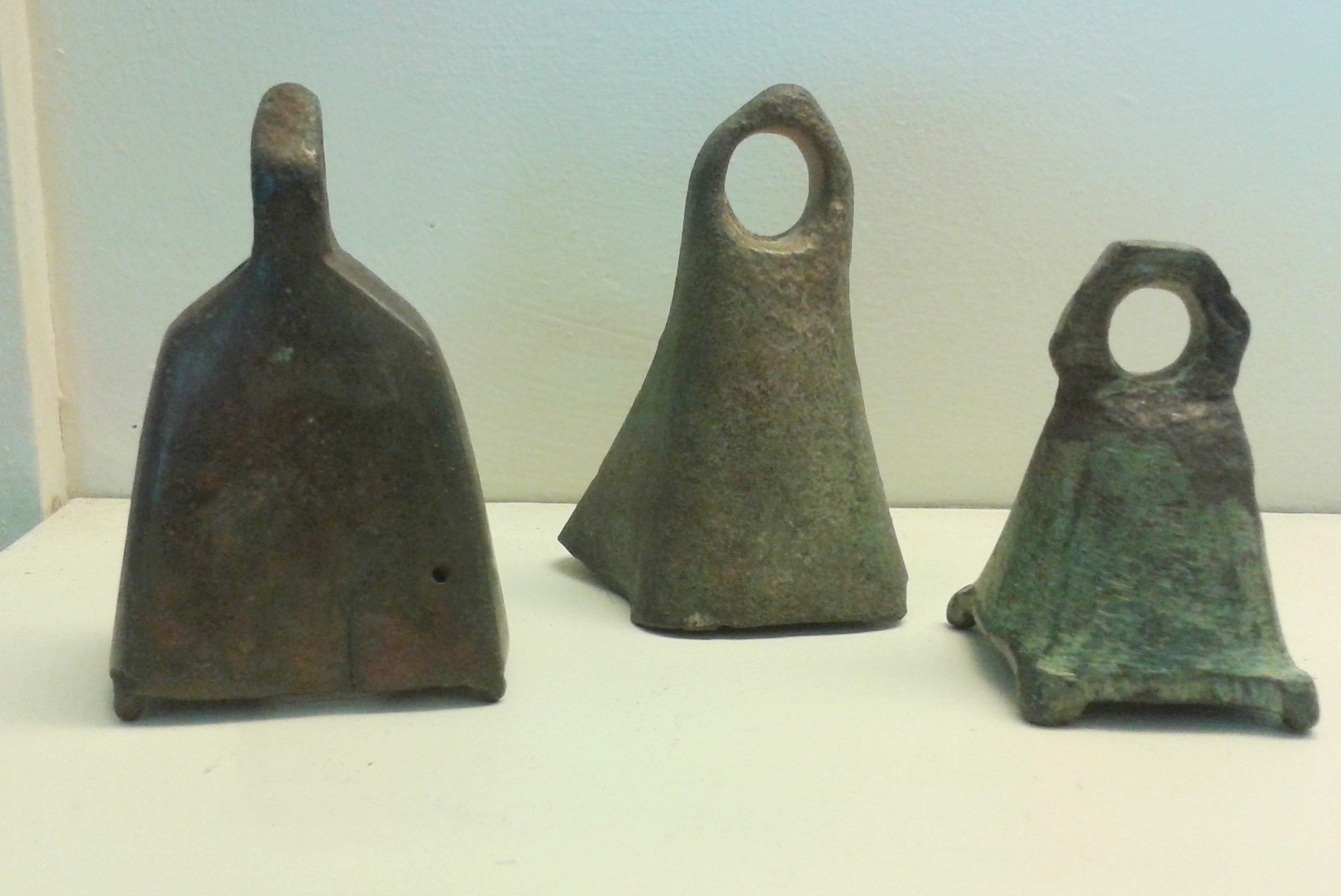
bells

==== Pre-Columbian archaeology ====
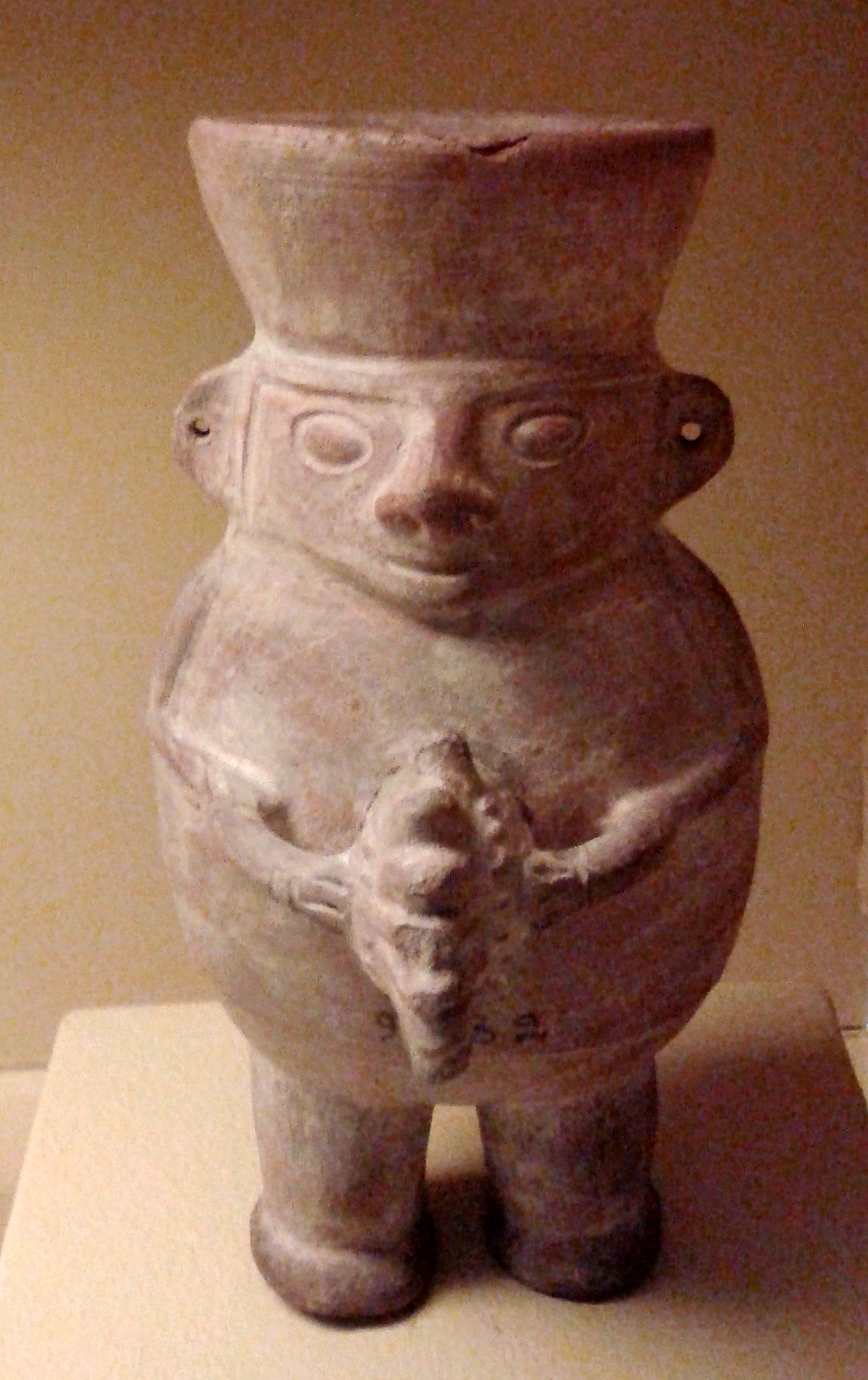
Peruvian Wari culture. Anthropomorphic ceramic figurine, 500–1200 AD

The National Museum housed an important group of about 1,800 artifacts produced by the Indigenous peoples of the Americas during the Pre-Columbian era, as well as Andean mummies. Gathered throughout the 19th century, the collection was based on holdings of the Brazilian royal family, with several objects coming from the private collection of Emperor Pedro II. It was later enlarged through acquisitions, donations, exchanges, and excavations. By the end of the 19th century, the collection already had considerable prestige, being cited, on the occasion of opening the 1889 Anthropological Exposition, as one of the largest collections of South American archaeology.

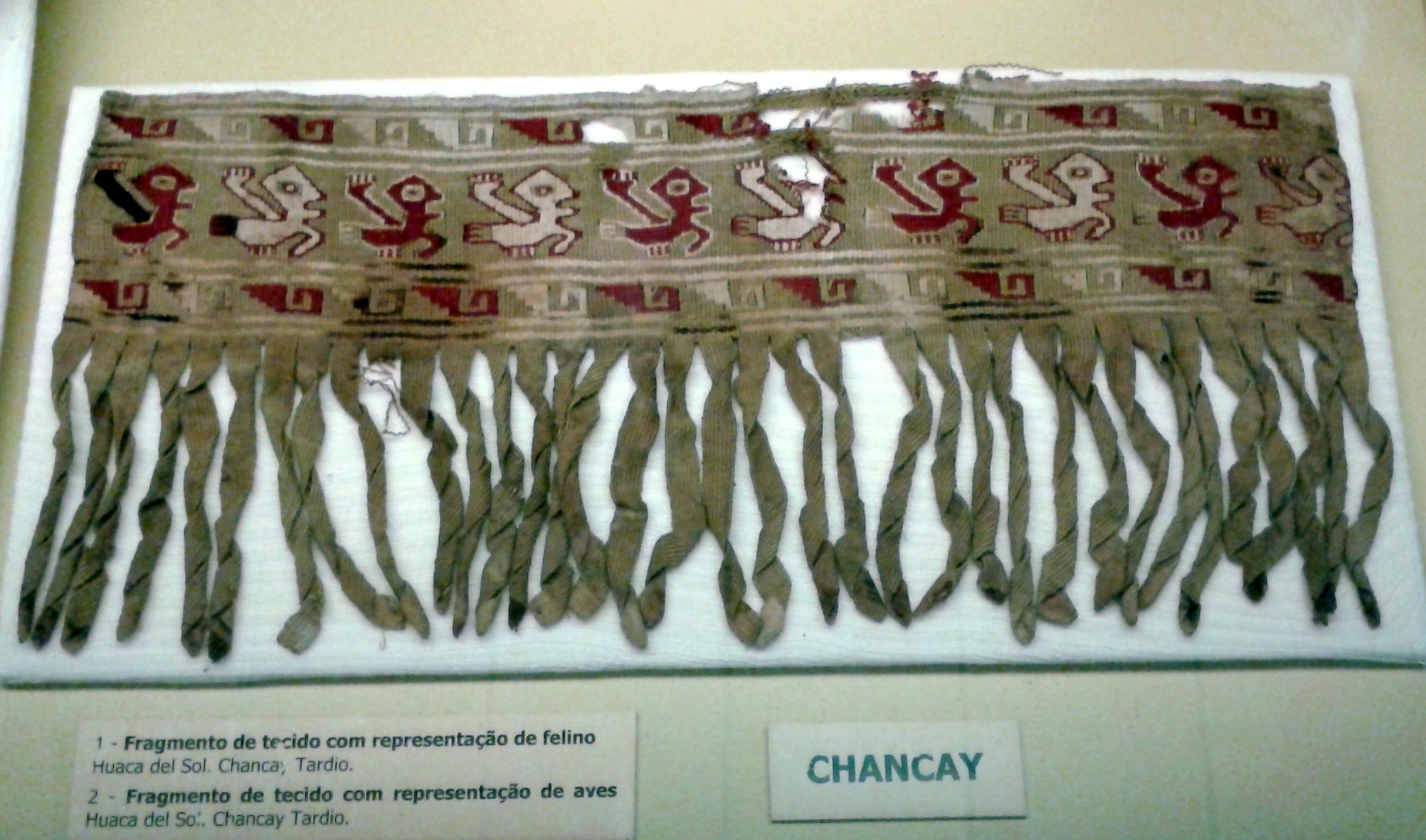
Peruvian Chancay culture. Fragment of textile with representation of birds. Huaca del Sol, Late Period, c. 1200–1400 AD

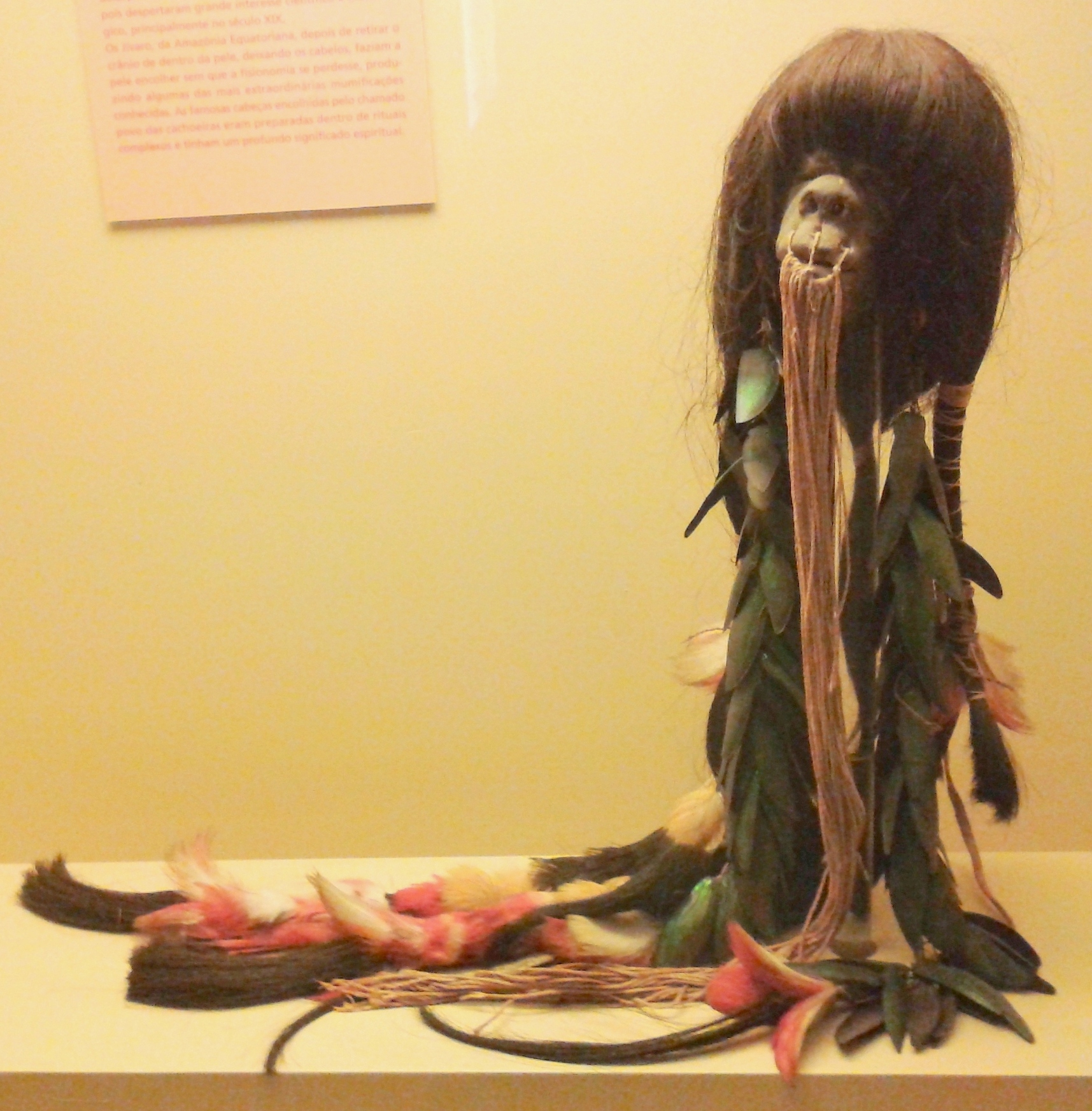
Shrunken head, mummified by the Ecuadorian-Peruvian Jivaroan peoples

The collection comprised mostly objects related to the textile manufacturing, featherwork, ceramic production, and stonecraft of the Andean cultures (groups of Peru, Bolivia, Chile, and Argentina) and, to a lesser extent, of the Amazonian natives (including a rare assemblage of artifacts from the area of present-day Venezuela) and Mesoamerican cultures (mainly from present-day Mexico and Nicaragua). Several aspects of the daily routine, social organization, religiosity, and imagery of the Pre-Columbian civilizations are addressed in the collection, which has items from common daily use (clothing, body ornaments, weapons) to more refined artifacts, imbued with notable artistic sense (measurement and musical instruments, ritual objects, figurative ceramic sculptures and vessels distinguished for their aesthetic features). Other aspects of Pre-Columbian life, such as the dynamics of trade, ideological diffusion, and cultural influences among the groups, are also represented in the collection. Items are evaluated in terms of the similarity of decorative patterns and artistic techniques, as well as in the subjects portrayed. Common to nearly all distinct groups are such subjects as plants, nocturnal animals (bats, serpents, owls), and fantastic creatures associated to natural elements and phenomena.

The best represented groups, in the context of Andean cultures, include:

- Nazca culture, which flourished on the southern coast of Peru between the 1st century BC and 800 AD. The National Museum has a large set of fragments of Nazca textiles depicting animals (mainly llamas), fantastic beings, plants, and geometric patterns;
- Moche civilization, which flourished on the northern coast of Peru between the early Christian era and 8th century AD, responsible for building large monuments, temples, pyramids, and ceremonial complexes, represented in the collection by a group of figurative pottery of high artistic and technical quality (zoomorphic, anthropomorphic, and globular vessels) and examples of goldsmithery;
- Wari culture, which inhabited the south-central Andes since the 5th century AD, represented by anthropomorphic ceramic vessels and textile fragments;
- Lambayeque culture, which arose in the homonymous region of Peru during the 8th century AD, exemplified in the collection through textiles, pottery and metalwork;
- Chimú culture, which flourished on the Valley of the Moche River since the 10th century AD, represented by a group of zoomorphic and anthropomorphic pottery (characteristically dark, obtained through the technique of reducing burning, and inspired by stylistic elements of the Moche and Wari cultures), as well as textiles decorated with varying motifs;
- Chancay culture, which developed between the Intermediate and Late periods (from about 1000 to 1470 AD), on the valleys of the rivers Chancay and Chillon, presented in the collection by a set of anthropomorphic pottery (characteristically dark, decorated with light-colored engobe and brown painting) and sophisticated textiles depicting animals and vegetables – namely a large mantle, with three meters of length;
- Inca civilization, which flourished around the 13th century AD and became the largest empire of the Pre-Columbian Americas in the following century. The National Museum possesses a set of figurative pottery and vessels decorated with geometric patterns ("Incan aryballos"), miniature figures of human beings and llamas, made with alloys of gold, silver, and copper, miniatures of Inca ceremonial clothing, featherwork, quipus, mantles, tunics, and several other examples of textiles.

The collection of Andean mummies of the National Museum allows a glimpse at the funerary practices of the cultures of the region. The mummies of the collection were preserved either naturally (as a result of the favorable geo-climatic conditions of the Andean Mountains) or artificially, in the context of religious and ritualistic practices. Originating from Chiu Chiu, at the Atacama Desert, northern Chile, there is a mummy of a man with an estimated age of 3,400 to 4,700 years, preserved in a seated position, with the head resting on the knees and covered by a wool cap. This was the position which the Atacaman cultures used to sleep, due to the cold climate of the desert. It was also the position in which they were buried, together with their belongings. A second mummy in the collection – an Aymara man, found in the surroundings of Lake Titicaca, between Peru and Bolivia – is preserved in the same position, but involved in a funerary bundle. The collection of mummies also include a boy, donated by the Chilean government, and, illustrating the techniques of artificial mummification of Pre-Columbian cultures, an example of a shrunken head, coming from the Jivaroan peoples of equatorial Amazon, of ritualistic purposes.

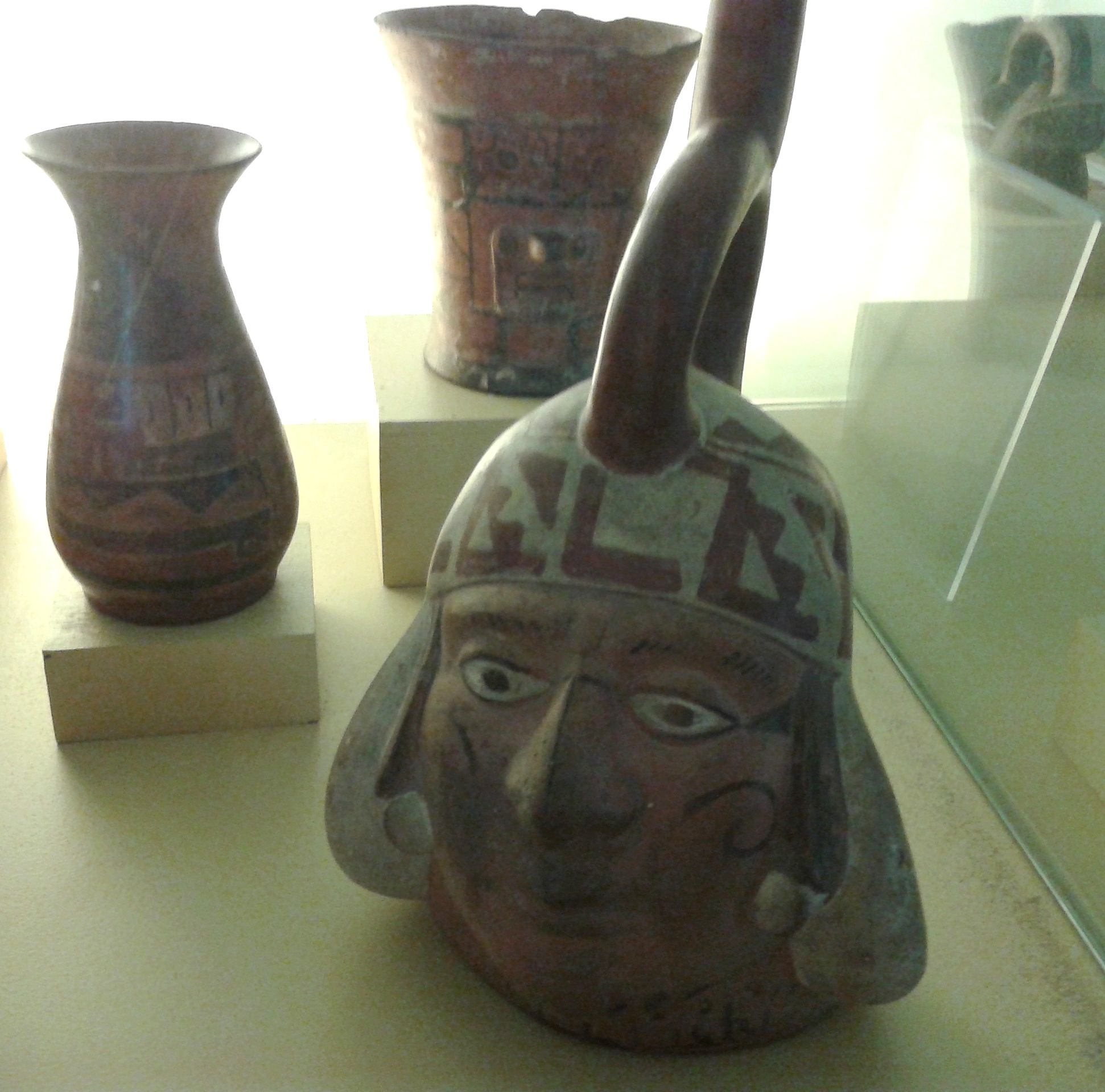
Peruvian Moche civilization. Head-shaped ceramic vessel, c. 100 BC–800 AD

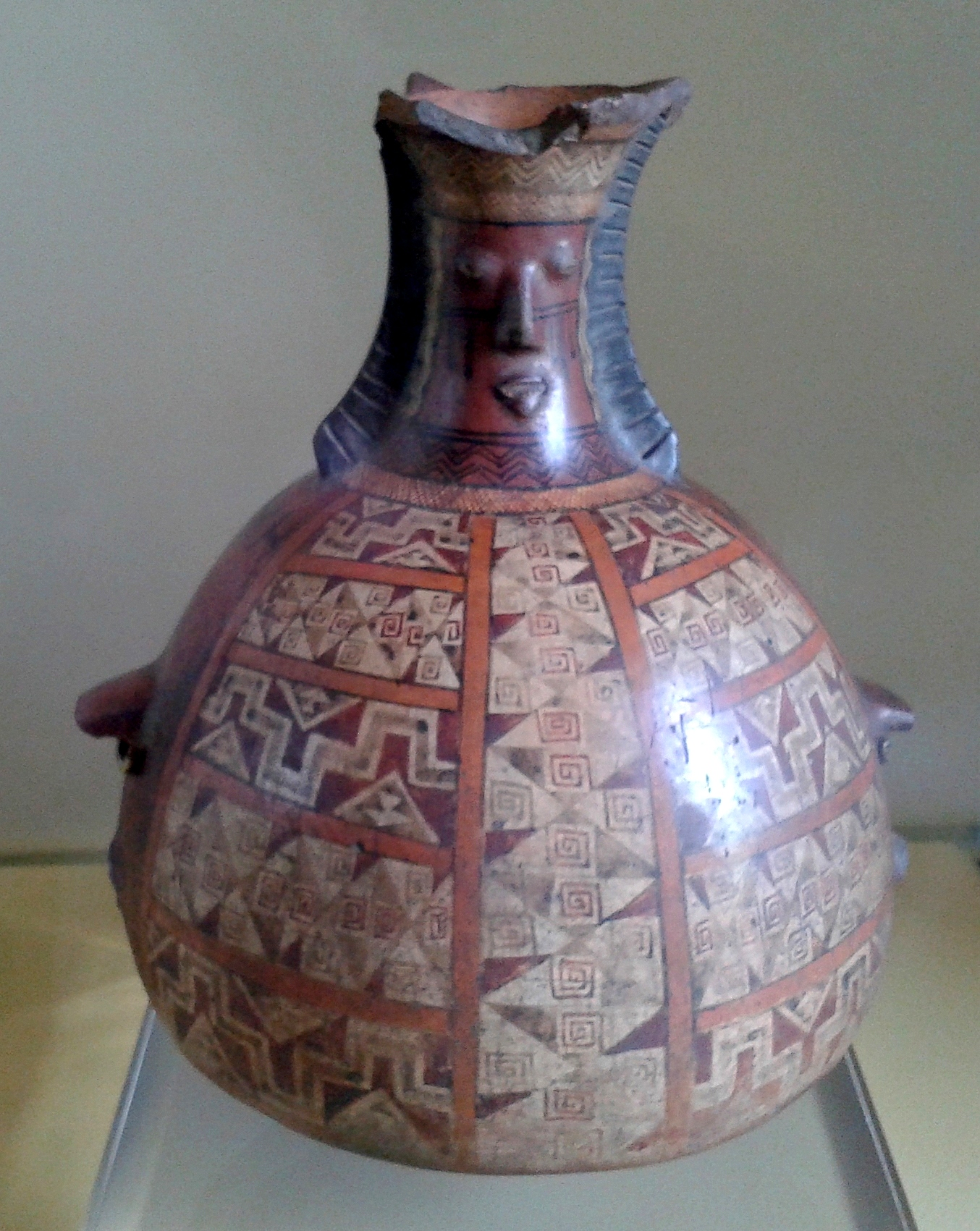
Inca civilization. Ceramic vase ("Inca Aryballos"), c. 1430–1532

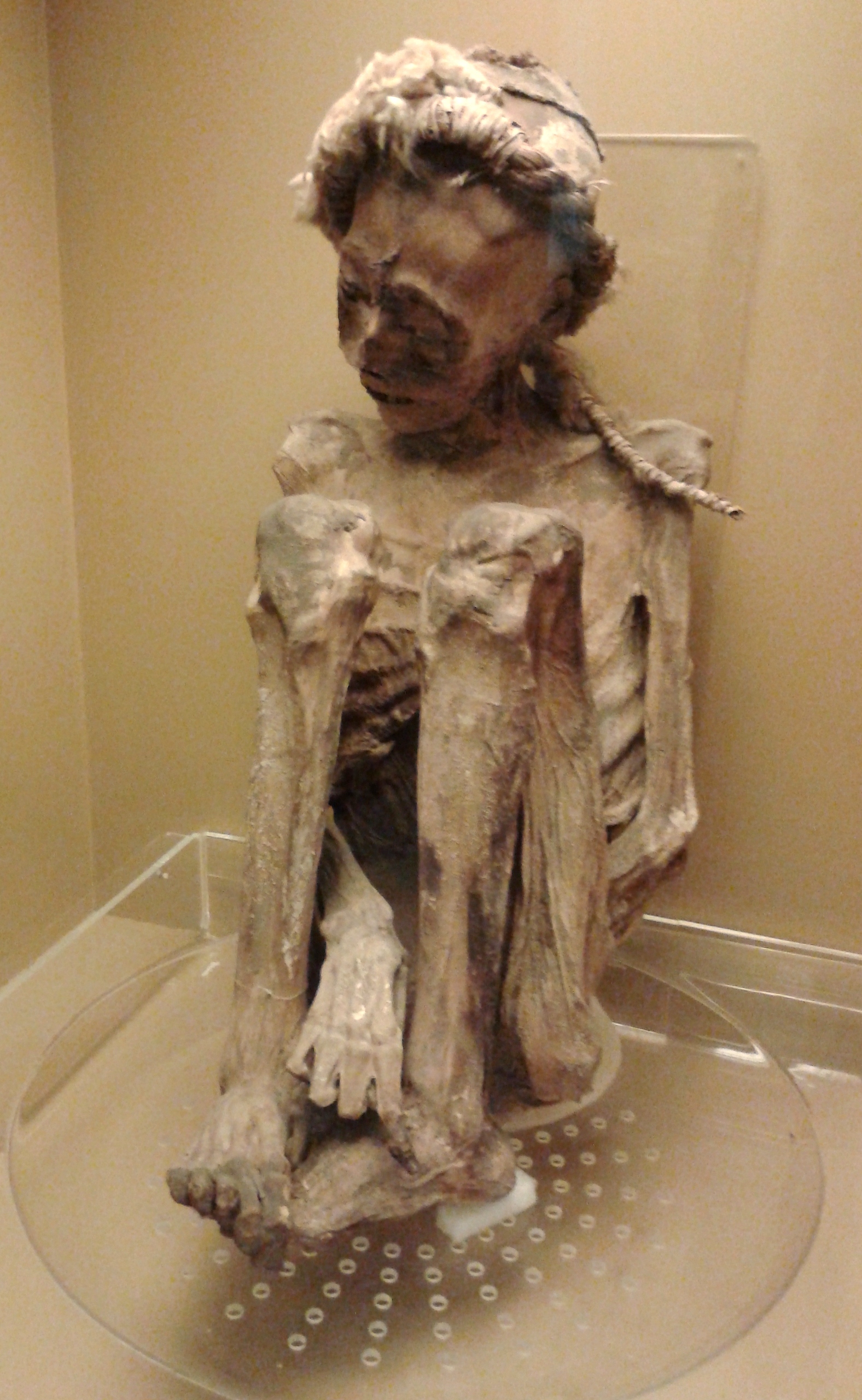
Mummy of a Chilean Atacaman man, c. 4700–3400 years before present.

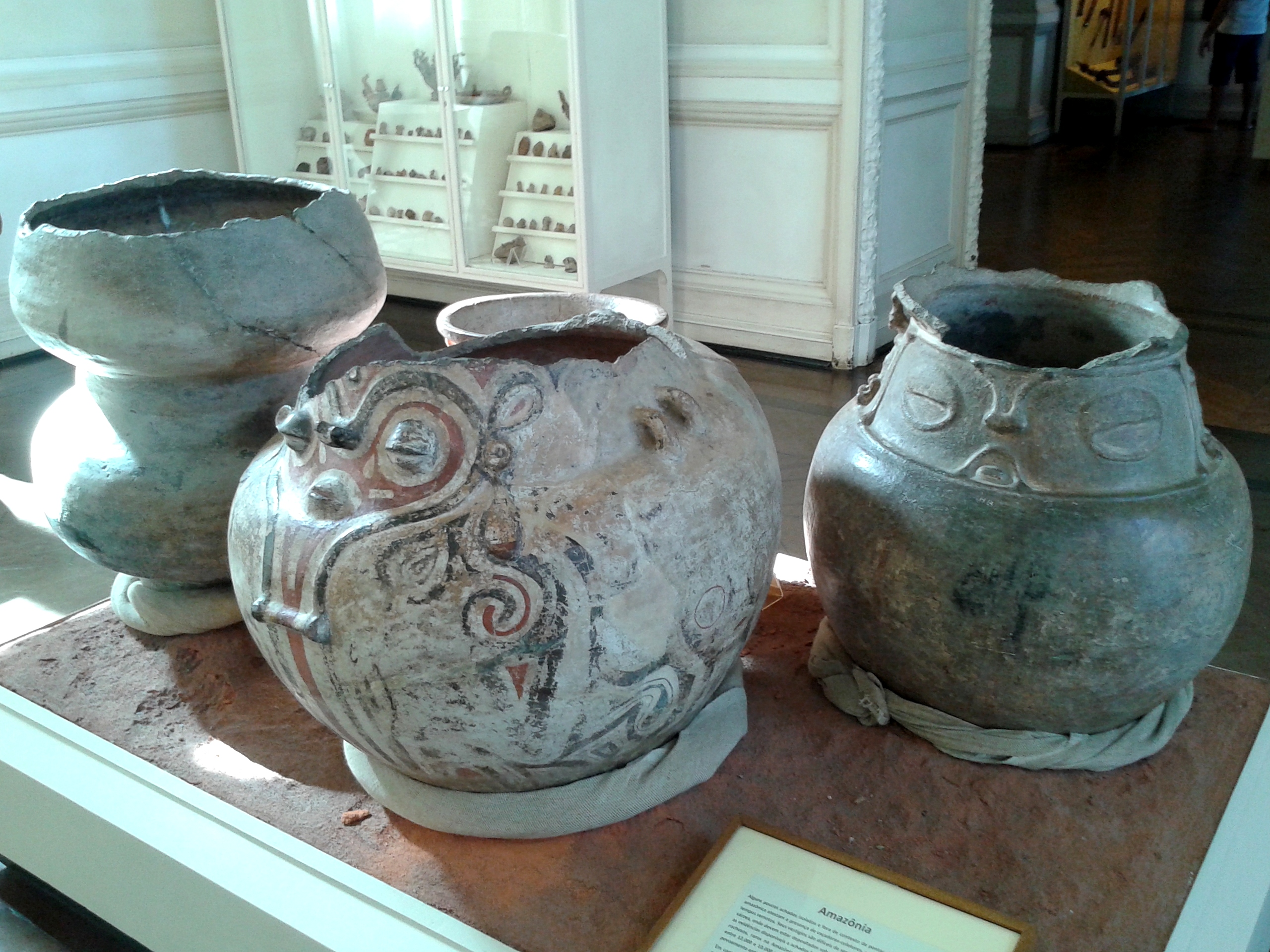
Amazonian Ceramics

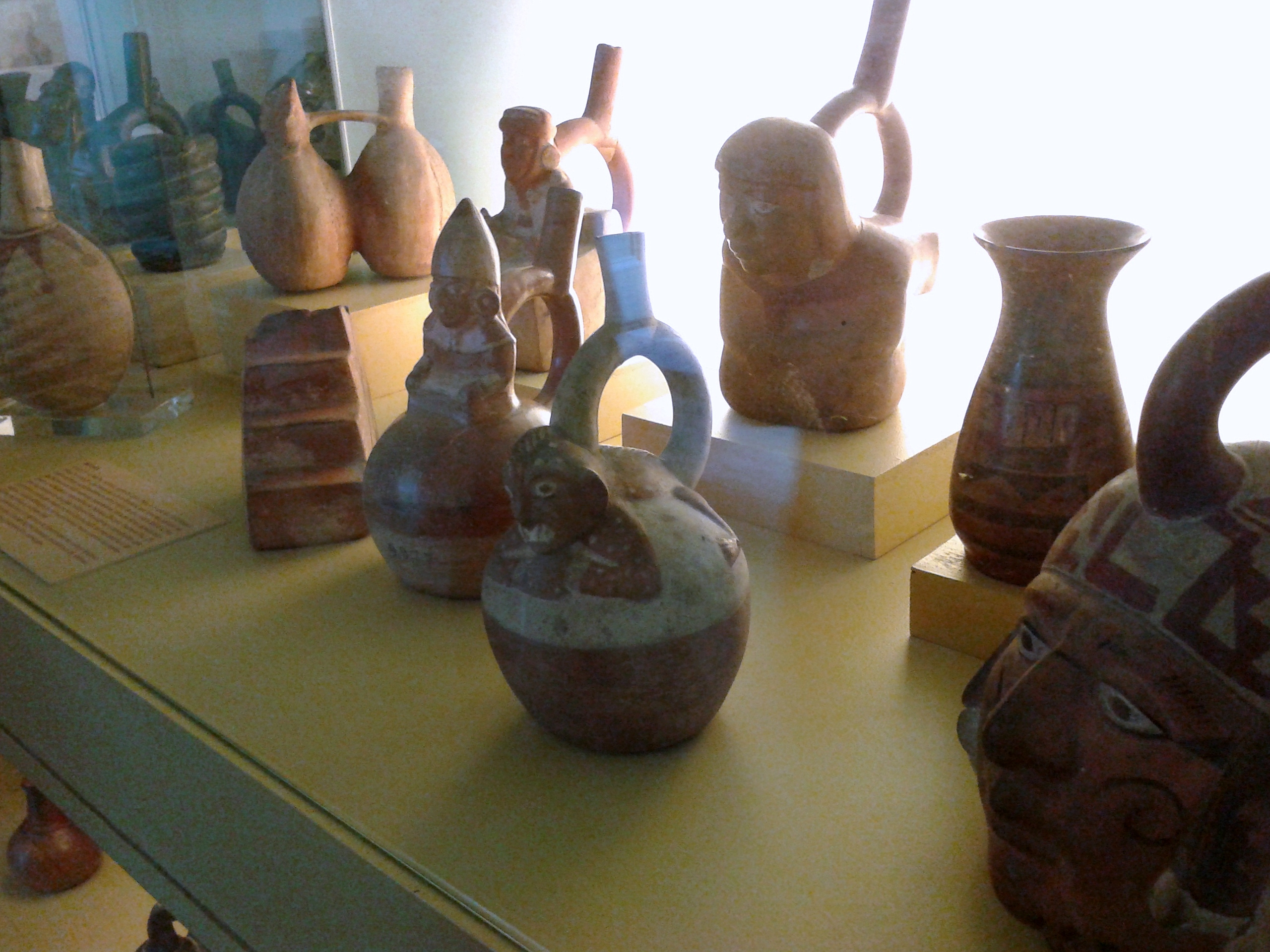
Ceramics

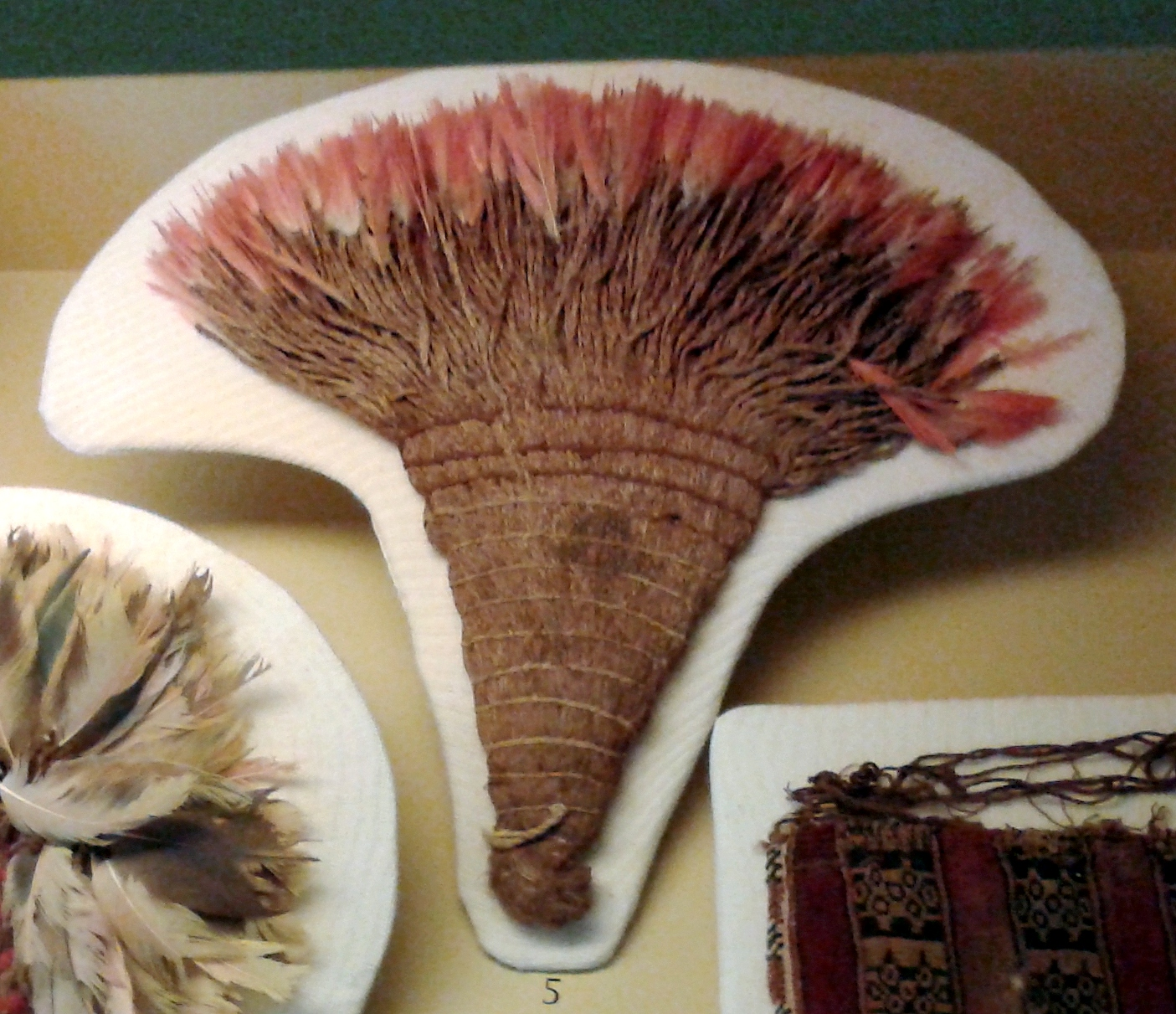
Plumes

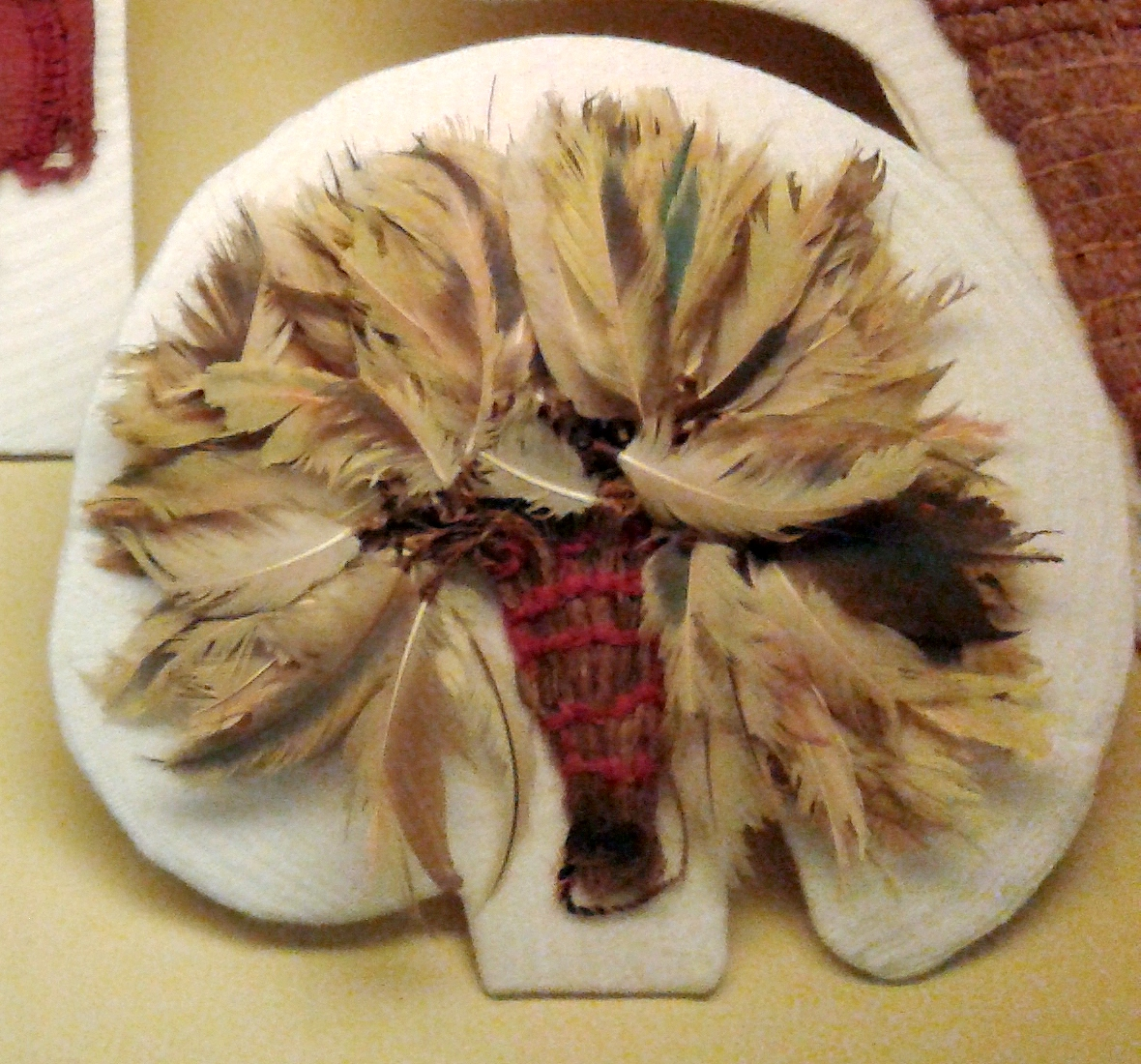
Plumes

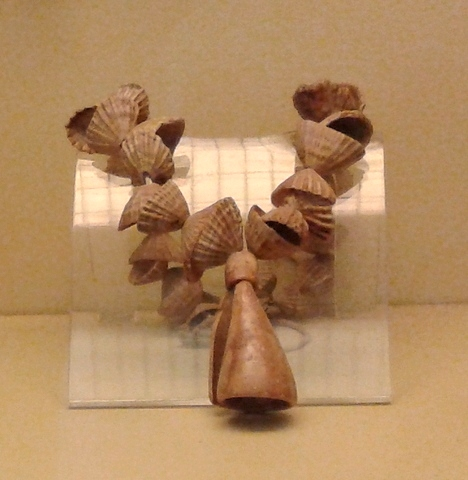
Accessories

==== Brazilian archaeology ====
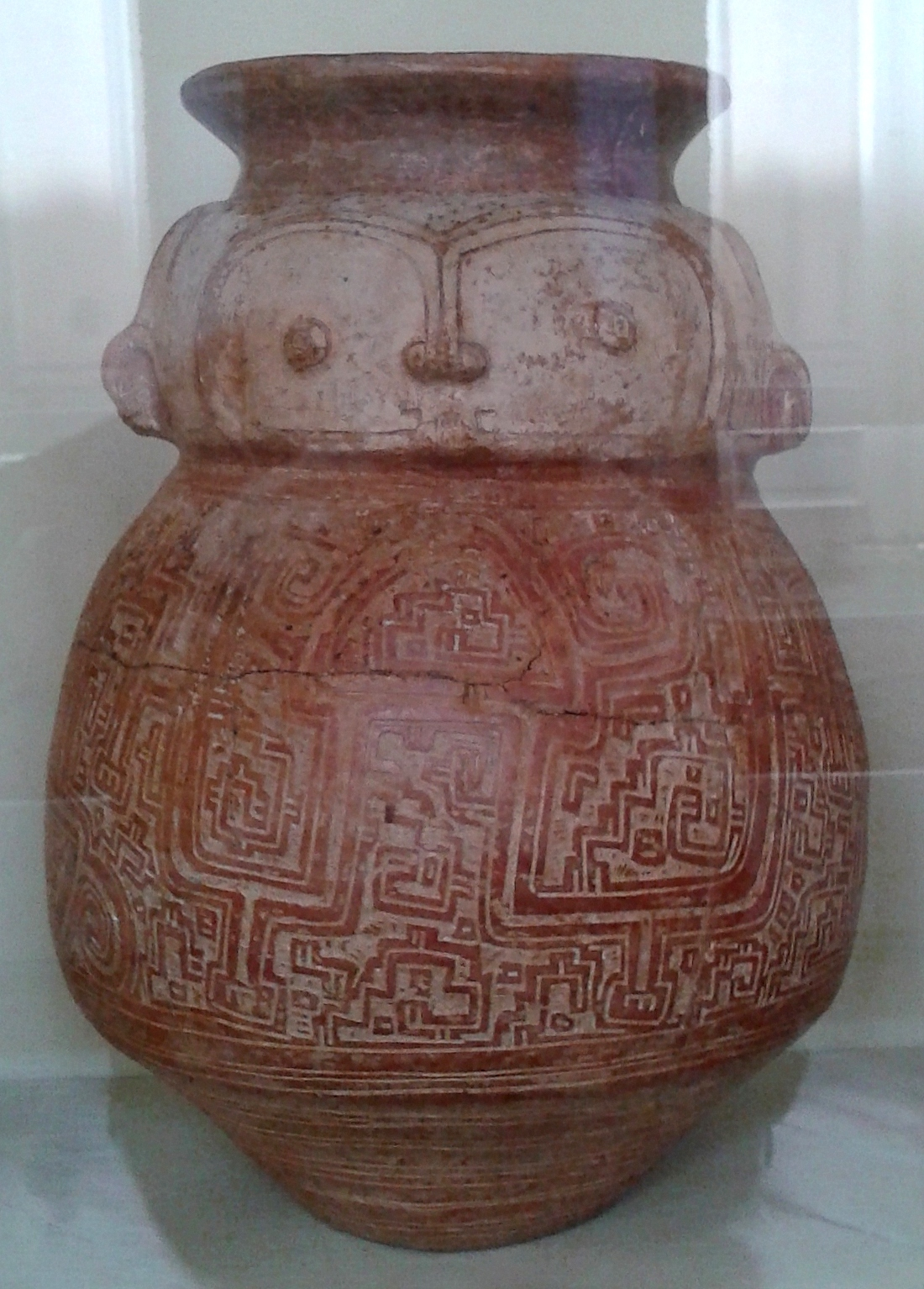
Marajoara culture. Anthropomorphic funerary urn, 400–1400 AD

The collection of Brazilian archaeology of the National Museum brought together a vast set of artifacts produced by the cultures that flourished in the Brazilian territory during the pre-colonial era, with more than 90,000 objects. It was considered the largest collection in its typology worldwide. Gradually assembled since the early 19th century, the collection started being systematically gathered since 1867 and has been continually expanded until the present day, through excavations, acquisitions and donations, also serving as basis for a large number of research projects conducted by the academics of the museum, the Federal University of Rio de Janeiro, and other institutions. It was composed of objects coming from all regions of Brazil, establishing a timeline spanning more than 10,000 years.

From the oldest inhabitants of the Brazilian territory (horticulturists and hunter-gatherer groups), the museum preserved several artifacts made of stone (flint, quartz and other minerals) and bones, such as projectile points used for hunting, axe blades of polished stone and other tools used for carving, scraping, cleaving, triturating, and piercing, in addition to artifacts of ceremonial use and adornments. Although objects made of wood, fiber, and resin were also produced, the majority of them didn't stand the test of time and are almost absent in the collection, except for some individual pieces – namely a woven straw basket covered by resin, only partially preserved, found in the southern coast of Brazil.

In the segment regarding the Sambaqui people, i.e. the fishing and gathering communities which lived in the south-central coast of Brazil between 8,000 years before present and the early Christian era, the National Museum holds a large number of vestiges originating from deposits constituted of agglomerated lime and organic material – the so-called Sambaquis, or middens. Two fragments of Sambaquis are preserved in the collection, in addition to a group of human skeletal remains found in these archaeological sites, as well as several cultural testimonies of the Sambaqui people, encompassing utilitarian objects used in routine tasks (vessels, bowls, pestles and mortars carved in stone), ceremonies and rituals (such as votive statuettes). Among the highlights of the Sambaqui collection, there is a large set of zoolites (stone sculptures of votive use, with representation of animals, such as fish and birds, and human figures).

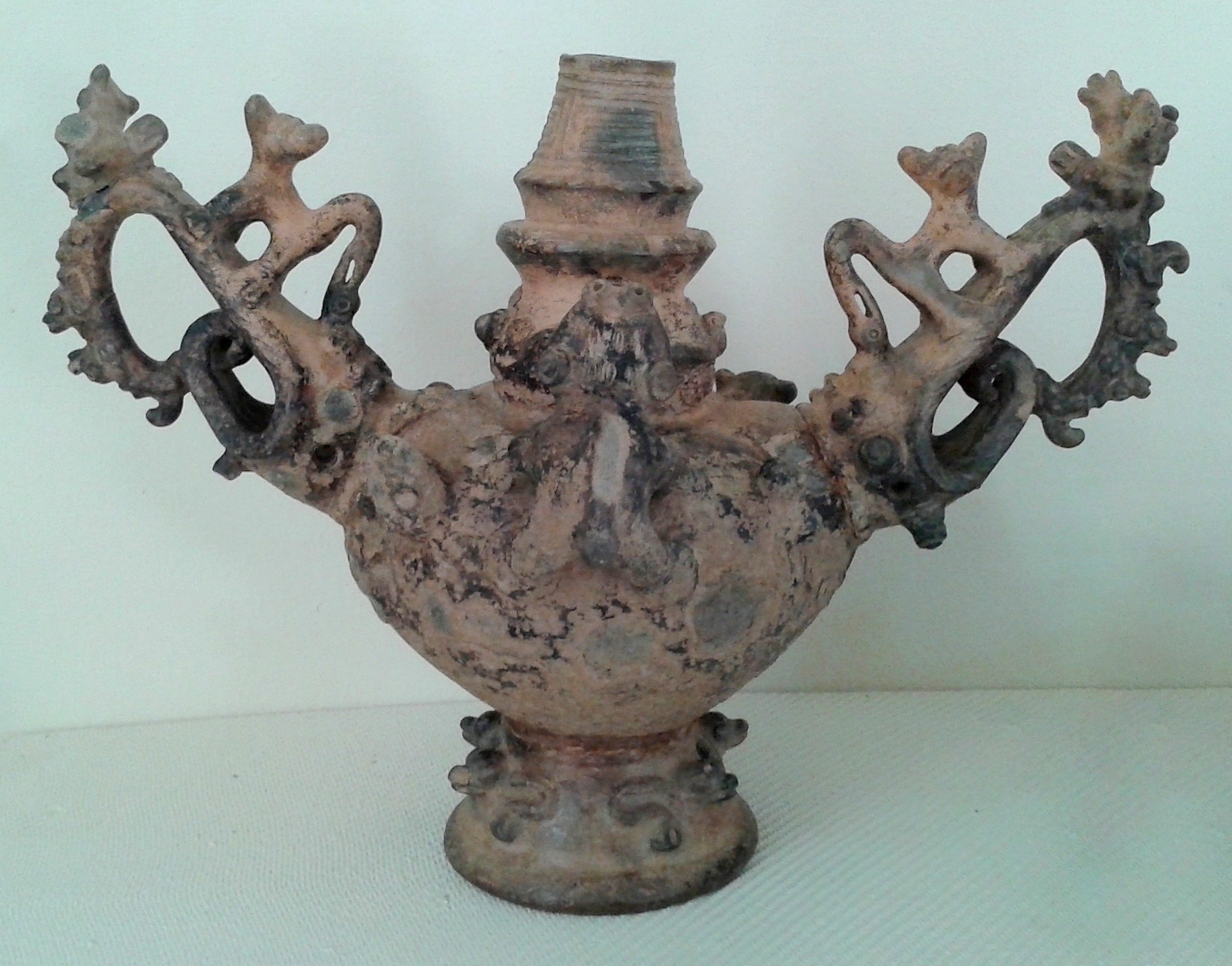
Santarém culture. Ceramic vessel ("caryatid" vase), 1000–1400 AD

The collection included several examples of funerary urns, rattles, dishes, bowls, clothing, dresses, idols, and amulets, with emphasis being placed on ceramic objects, produced by numerous cultures of precolonial Brazil. Best represented groups in the collection include:

- Marajoara culture, which flourished on Marajó island, at the mouth of the Amazon River, between the 5th and the 15th centuries, considered the group that reached the highest level of social complexity in precolonial Brazil. The museum has a vast assemblage of Marajoara pottery, notable for their heightened artistic and aesthetic sense, as well as for the variety of shapes and refined decoration – mostly works of figurative nature (representations of humans and animals), combined with rich geometric patterns (compositions imbued with symmetry, rhythmic repetitions, paired elements, binary oppositions, etc.) and with a predominant usage of the excision technique. Major part of the ceramic pieces are of ceremonial nature, used in funerary contexts, rites of passage, etc. Among the highlights, it's possible to mention the anthropomorphic statuettes (particularly the phallus-shaped female figurines, uniting the male and female principles, a recurring theme of the Marajoara art), large-scale funerary urns, anthropomorphic vases with geometric decoration, ritual thongs, zoomorphic, anthropomorphic and hybrid vessels, etc.
- Santarém culture (or Tapajós culture), which inhabited the region of the Tapajós River in the state of Pará, between the 5th and the 15th centuries, known for their ceramic work of peculiar style and high technical quality, produced with the techniques of modeling, incision, dotted lines, and appliqué, imbued with aesthetic features that suggest the influence of the Mesoamerican civilizations. Among the highlights of the collection were the anthropomorphic statuettes of naturalist style (characterised by the closed eyes, shaped like coffee beans), the anthropomorphic and zoomorphic vessels, vases for ceremonial use and, above all, the so-called "caryatid vases" – complex ceramic vessels, endowed with bottlenecks, reliefs and pedestals decorated with anthropomorphic and zoomorphic figurines and fantastic beings. The museum also possesses several examples of Muiraquitãs, i.e. small statuettes carved in green gems, shaped like animals (mainly frogs) used as adornments or amulets.

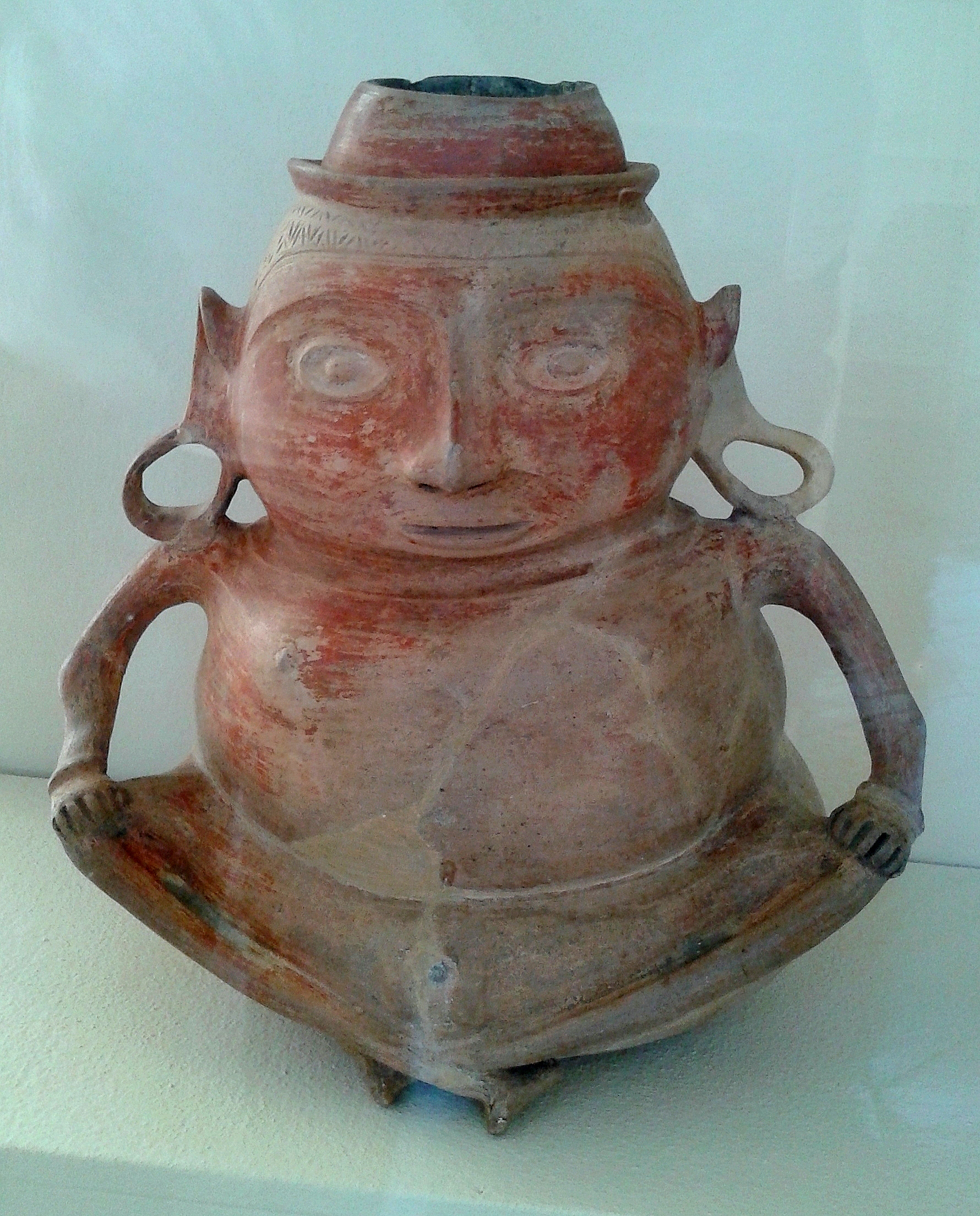
Santarém culture. Anthropomorphic vase representing a seated man, 1000–1400 AD.

- Konduri culture, which reached their apex in the 7th century and met their decline in the 15th century, and inhabited the region between the Trombetas and Nhamundá rivers, in Pará. Although this culture kept an intense contact with the Santarém culture, their artistic production developed unique features. The Konduri collection is primarily composed of pottery, noted for the techniques of decoration such as incision and dotted lines, the lively polychromy, and the reliefs with anthropomorphic and zoomorphic motifs.
- Trombetas River culture, which inhabited the lower Amazon, in the state of Pará, near the region of Santarém. This culture, still largely unknown, was responsible for producing rare artifacts sculpted in polished stone and objects imbued with stylistic elements common to the Mesoamerican cultures. The museum collection preserves lithic artifacts of ceremonial use, as well as anthropomorphic and zoomorphic statuettes (zoolites representing fish and jaguars).
- Miracanguera culture, which flourished on the left bank of the Amazon river, in the region between Itacoatiara and Manaus, between the 9th and the 15th centuries. The museum preserved several examples of ceremonial pottery, mainly anthropomorphic funerary urns characterized by the presence of bulges, necks, and lids, used to store the ashes of the deceased, and other vessels related to funerary rituals. The Miracanguera pottery is distinguished for the presence of tabatinga layers (clay mixed with organic materials) and the eventual painted decoration of geometric motifs. The plastic composition frequently outlines specific details, such as human figures in a seated position, with the legs represented.

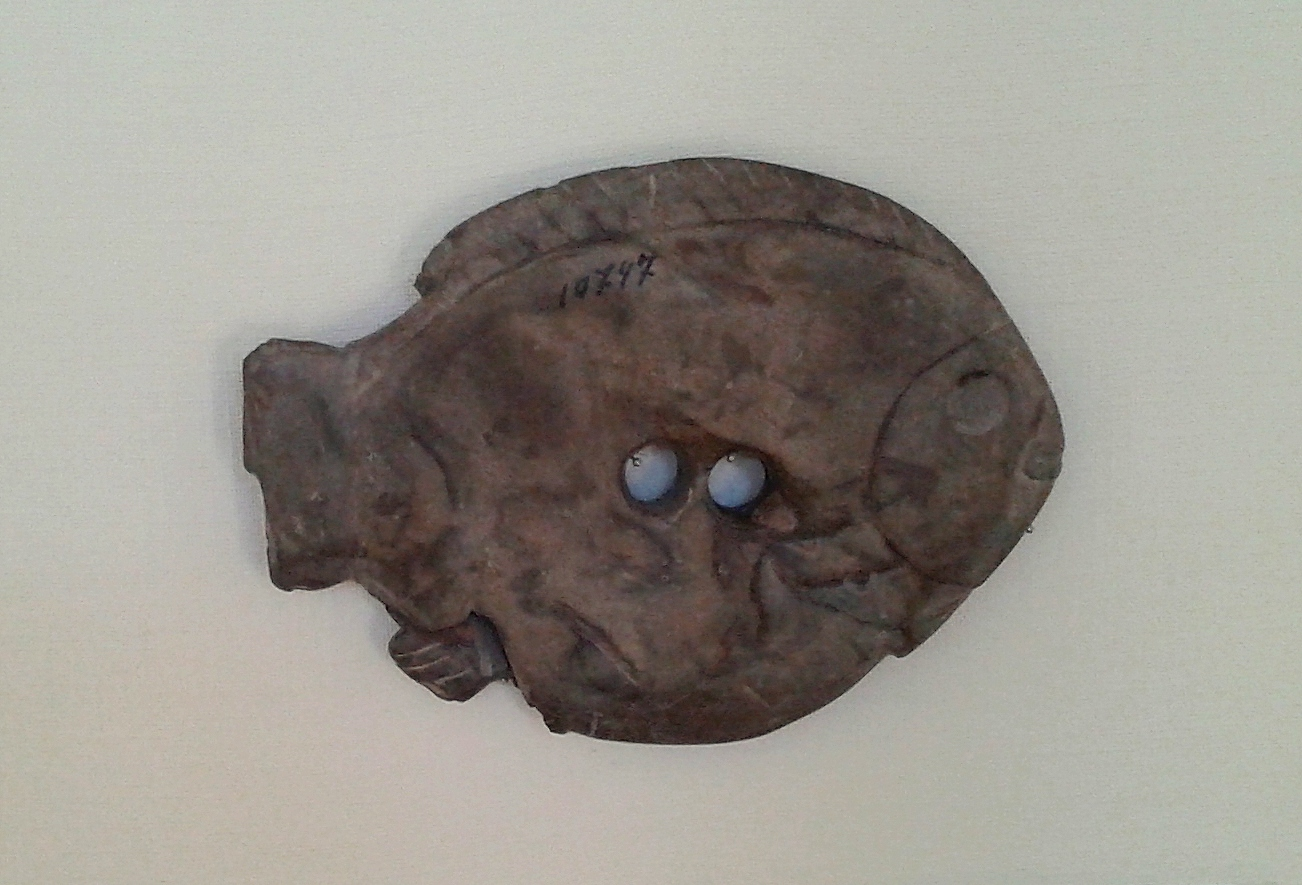
Trombetas River culture. Zoolite in the shape of a fish, w/d

- Maracá culture, which lived in the region of Amapá between the 15th and the 18th centuries, represented in the collection by a group of typical funerary urns depicting male and female figurines in hierarchic position, with head-shaped lids, as well as zoomorphic funerary urns depicting quadrupedal animals, originating from indigenous cemeteries located in the outskirts of the Maracá River. The Maracá pottery was frequently adorned with geometric patterns and polychromed with white, yellow, red, and black pigments. Ornaments in the members and the head of the figures expressed the social identity of the deceased.
- Tupi-Guaraní culture, which inhabited the Brazilian coast when the Portuguese arrived in the 16th century – subdivided into the group of the Tupinambá people (in the North, Northeast, and Southeast regions of Brazil) and the group of the Guaraní people (in the South region of Brazil and parts of Argentina, Paraguay, and Uruguay). The collection is predominantly composed of ceramics and lithic artifacts of daily use (such as pans, bowls, jars, and dishes) or ritual nature (mainly funerary urns). The Tupi-Guaraní pottery is characterized by its distinct polychromy (with predominance of red, black, and white pigments) and drawings of geometric and sinuous patterns.

The National Museum held the oldest known examples of indigenous mummies found in the Brazilian territory. The collection consisted of the body of an adult woman of approximately 25 years of age, and two children, one located at her feet, with an estimated age of twelve months, involved in a bundle, and a new-born, also covered by a mantle, positioned behind the head of the woman. This mummified set is composed of individuals that probably belonged to the group of the Botocudos (or Aimoré) people, of the Macro-Jê branch. They were found at the Caverna da Babilônia, a cavern located in the city of Rio Novo, interior of the state of Minas Gerais, in a farm that belonged to Maria José de Santana, who donated the mummies to emperor Pedro II. As an act of gratitude for this favor, Pedro II awarded Maria José with the title of Baroness of Santana.

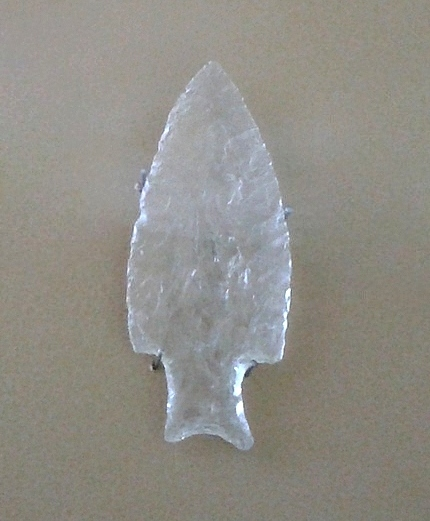
Hunter-gatherer groups. Projectile point.

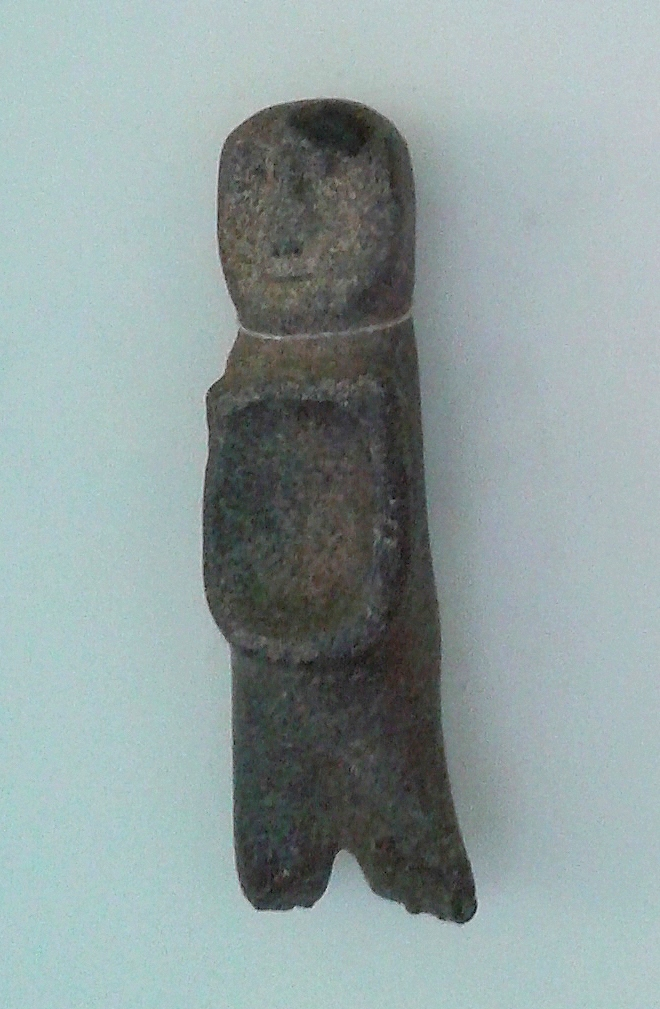
Sambaqui culture. Stone sculpture of a human figure

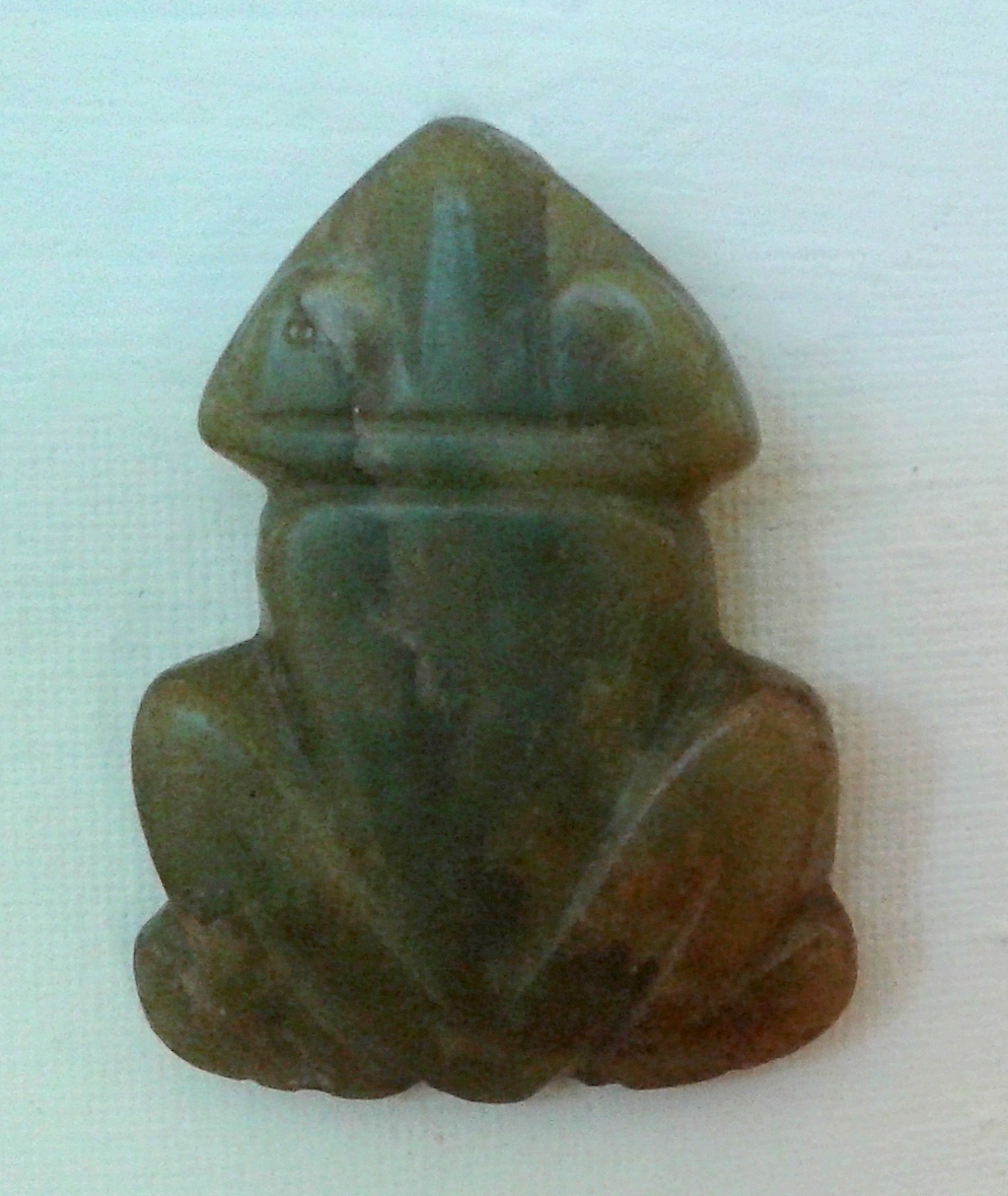
Santarém culture. Muiraquitã in the shape of a frog, 1000–1400 AD

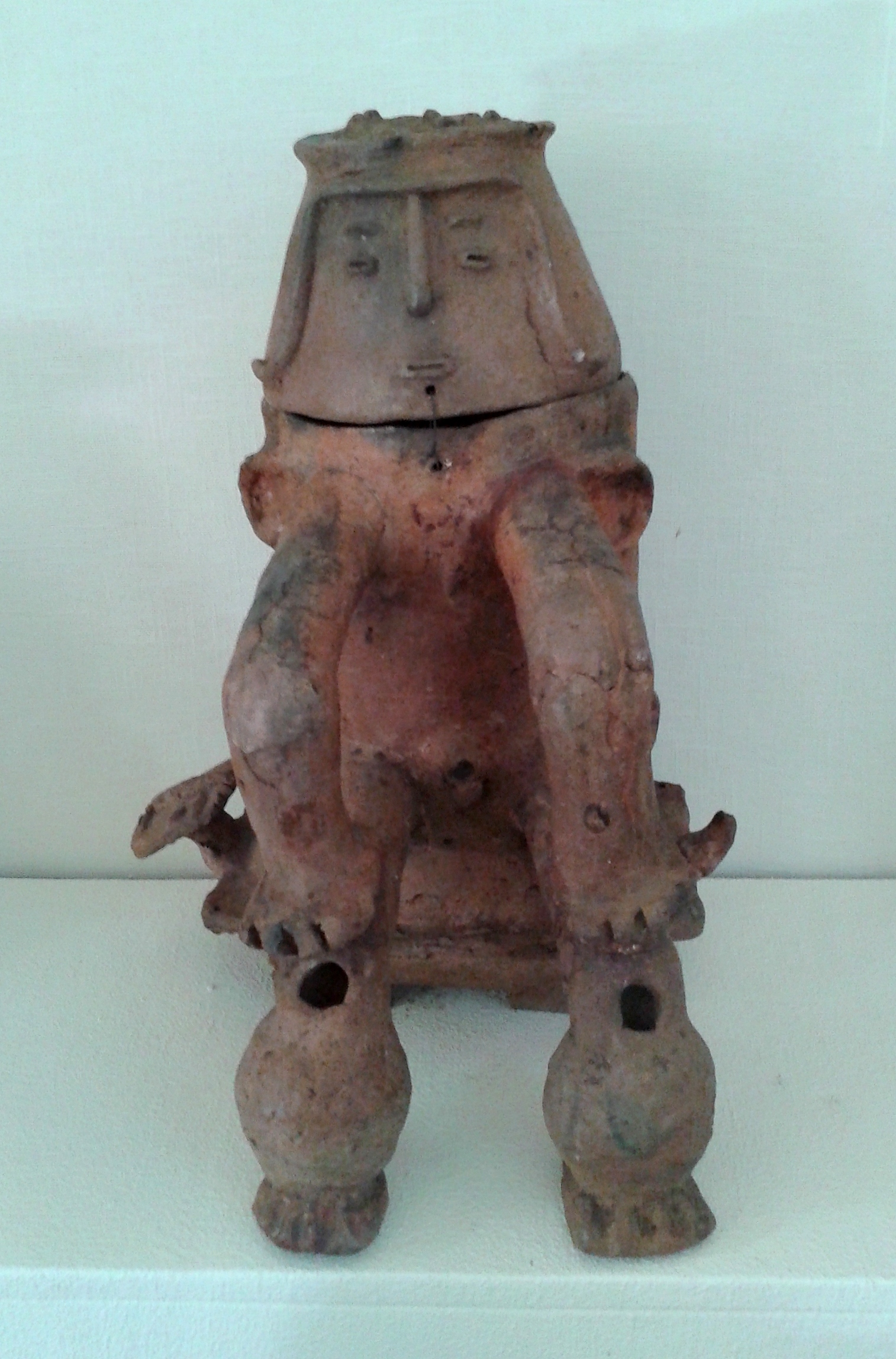
Maracá culture. Anthropomorphic funerary urn, 1000–1500 AD

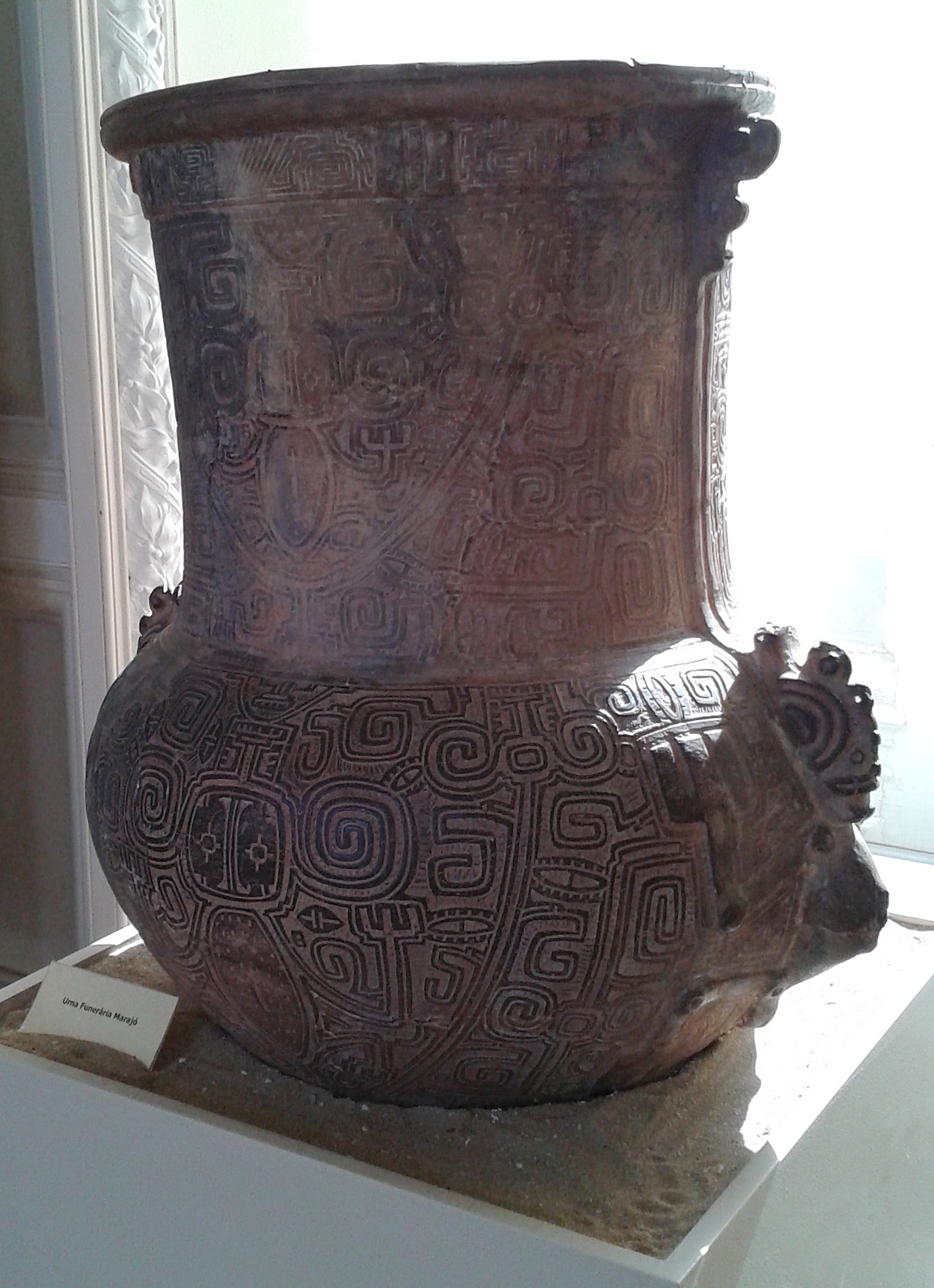
Marajoara urn

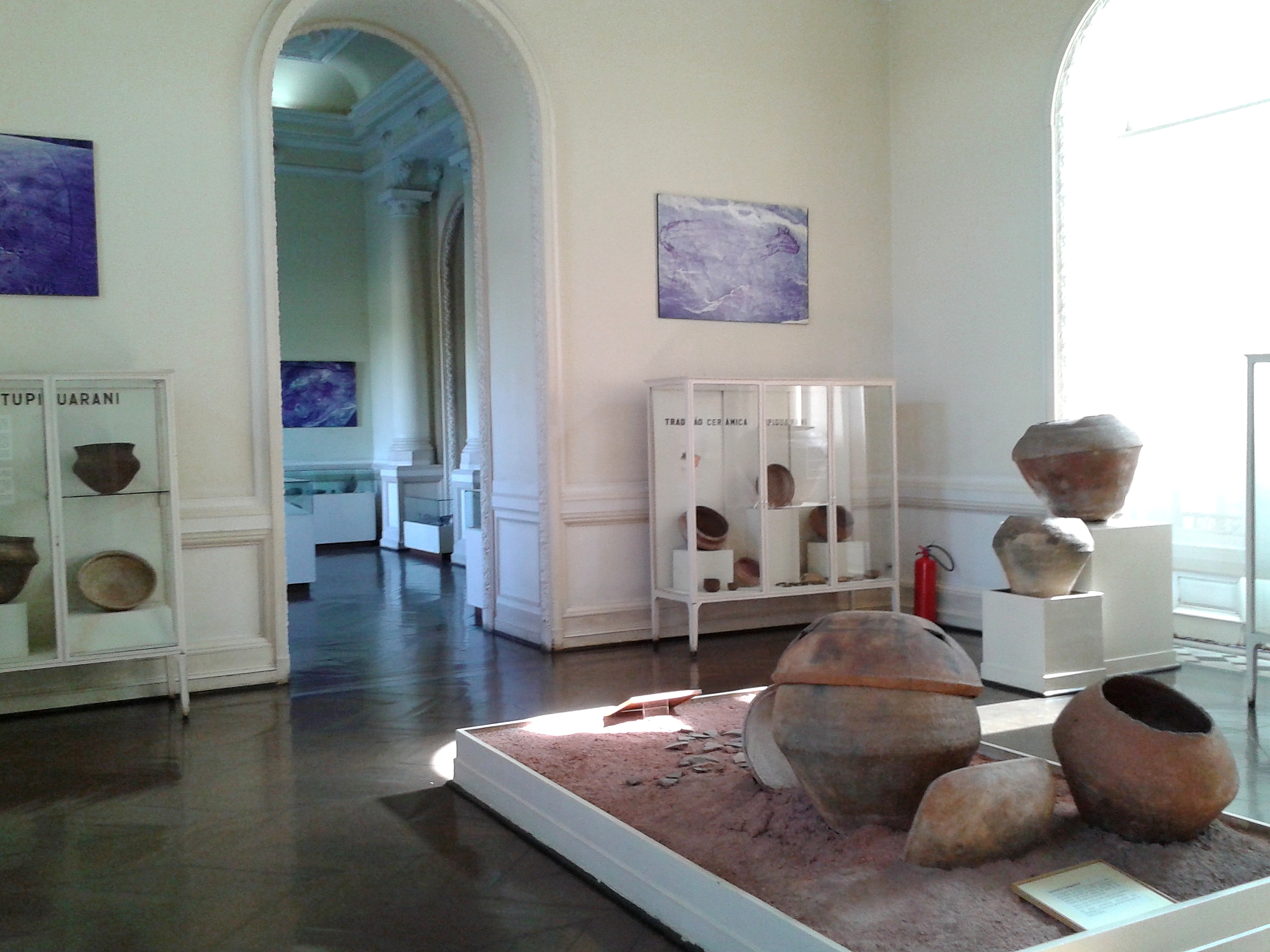
Ceramics

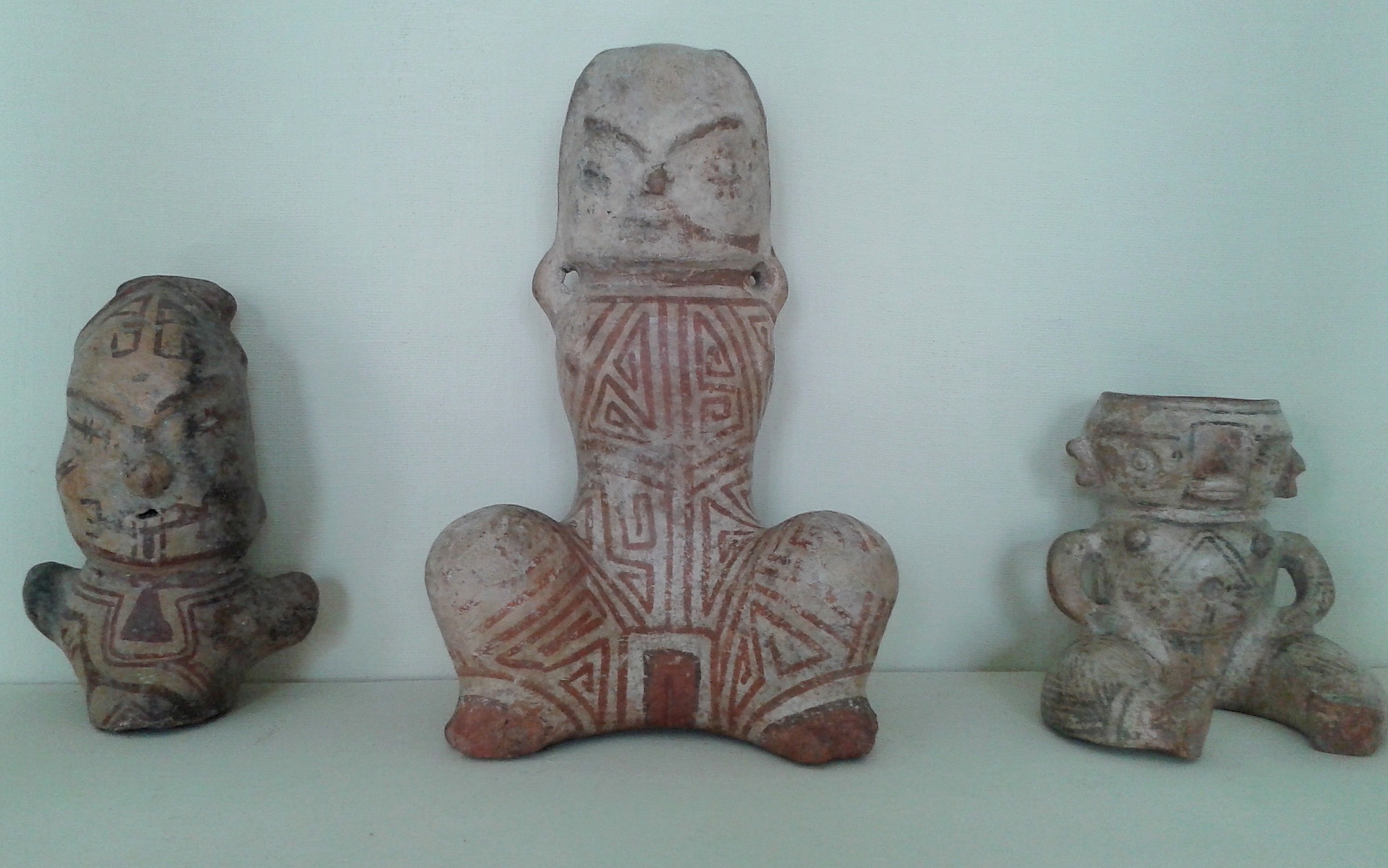
Statuettes

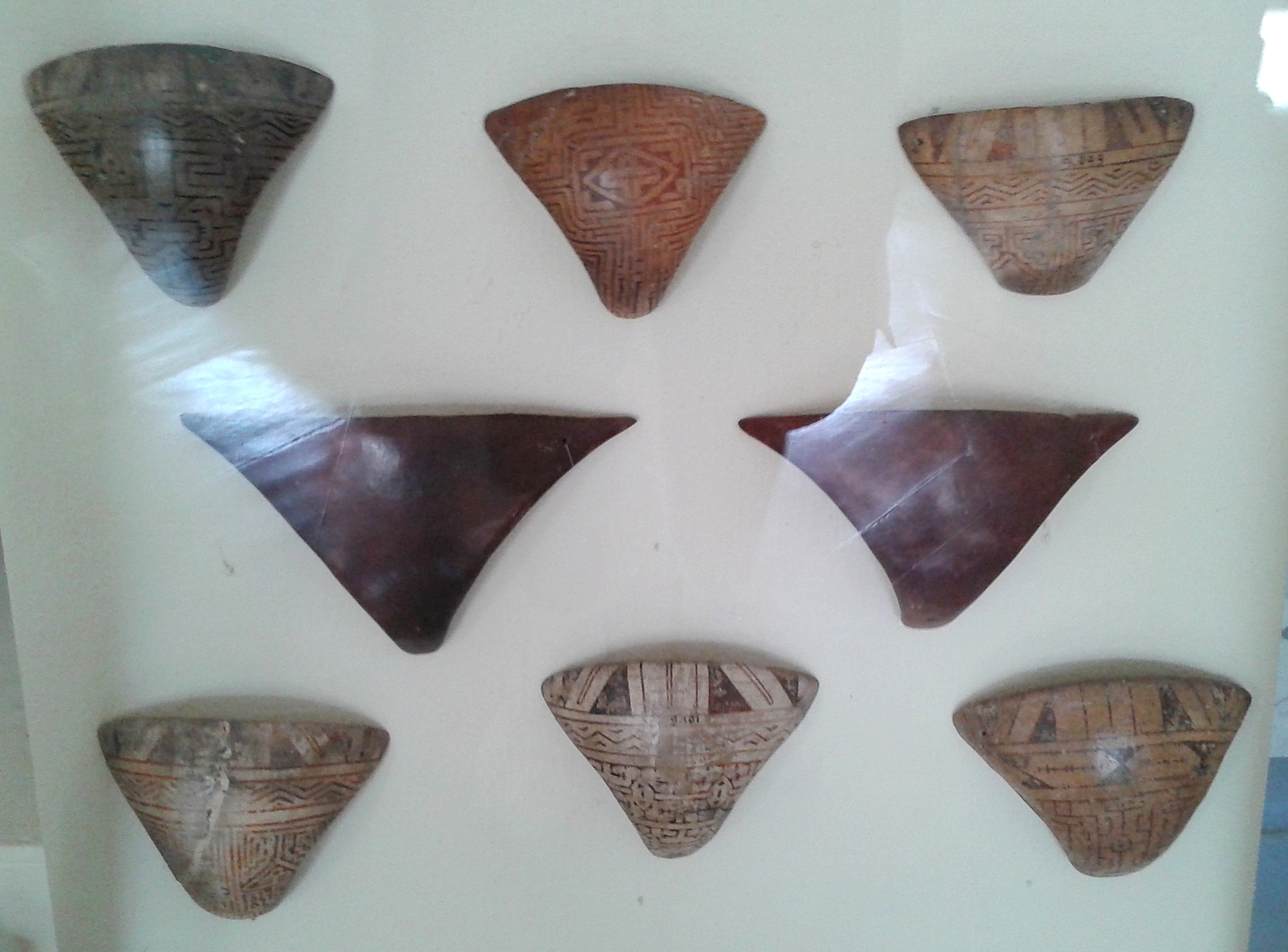
Marajora items

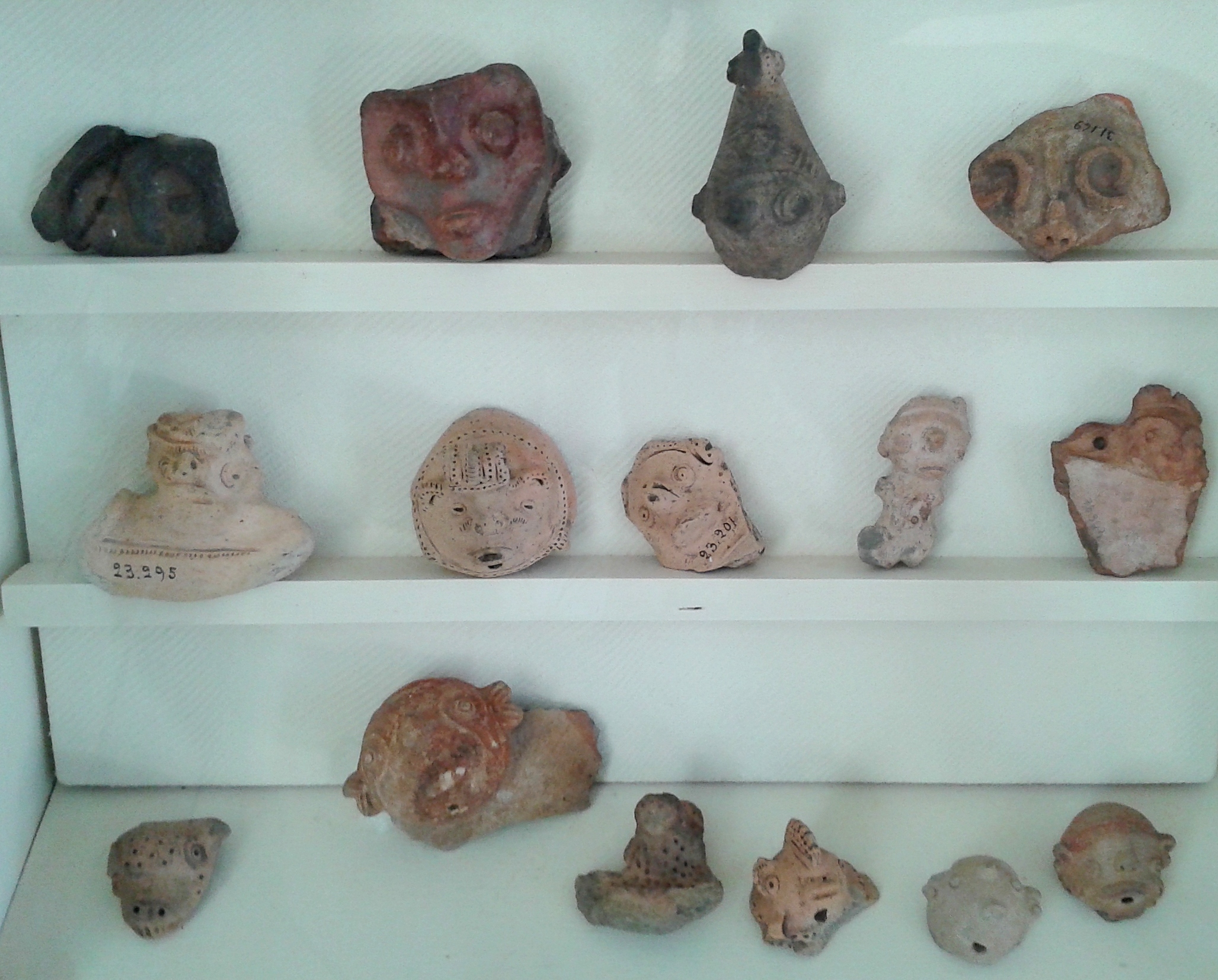
Santarém items

== Gallery ==
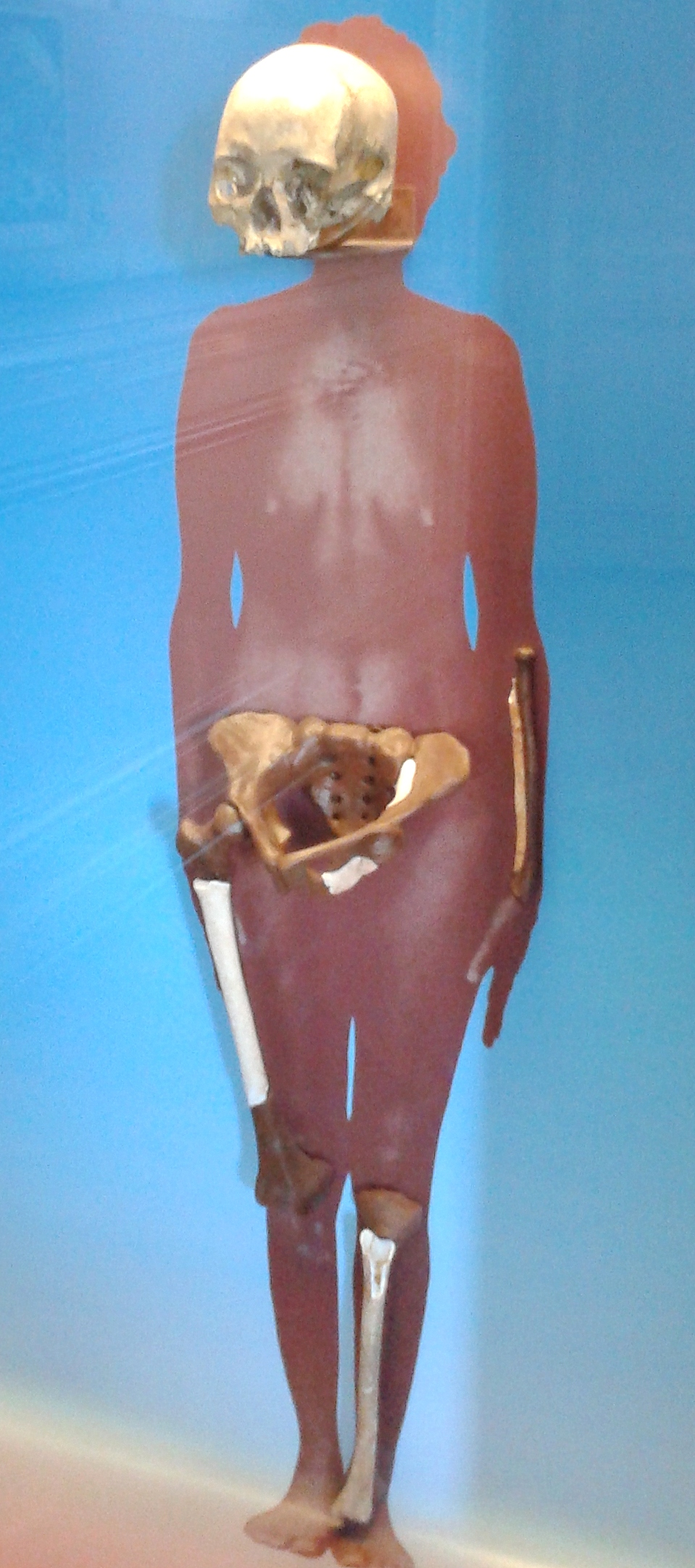
Luzia Woman

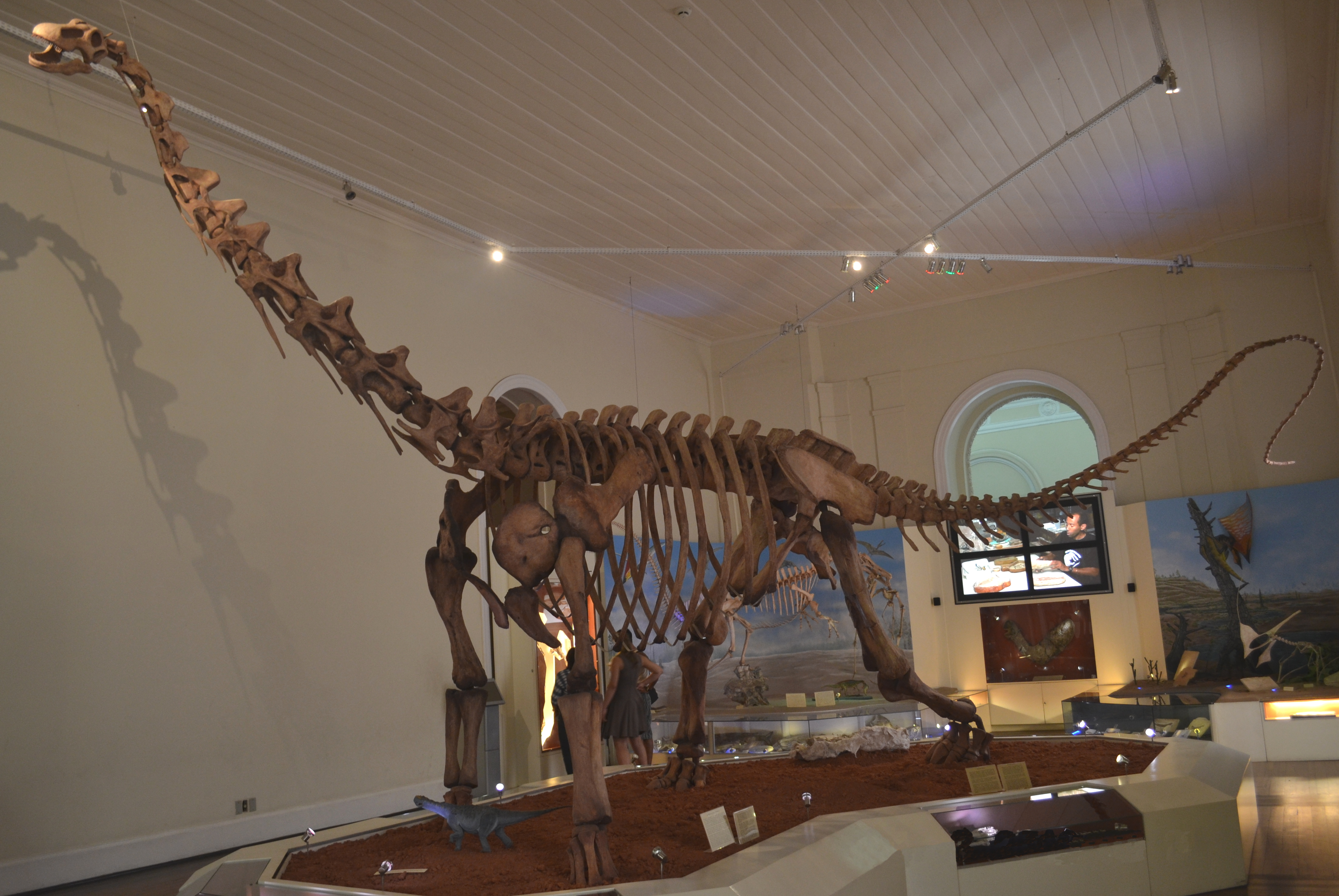
Maxakalisaurus

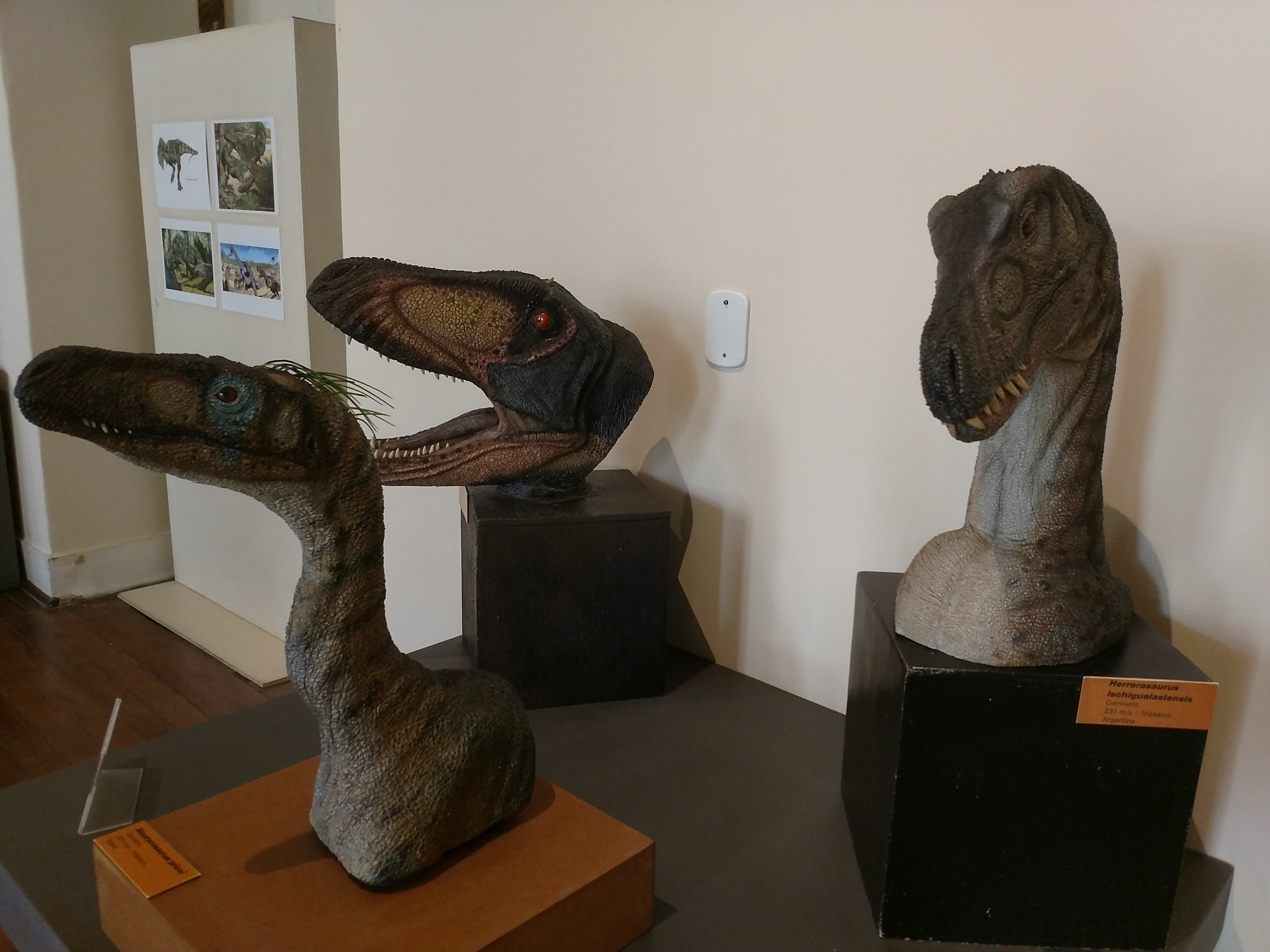
Recreation of dinosaur heads

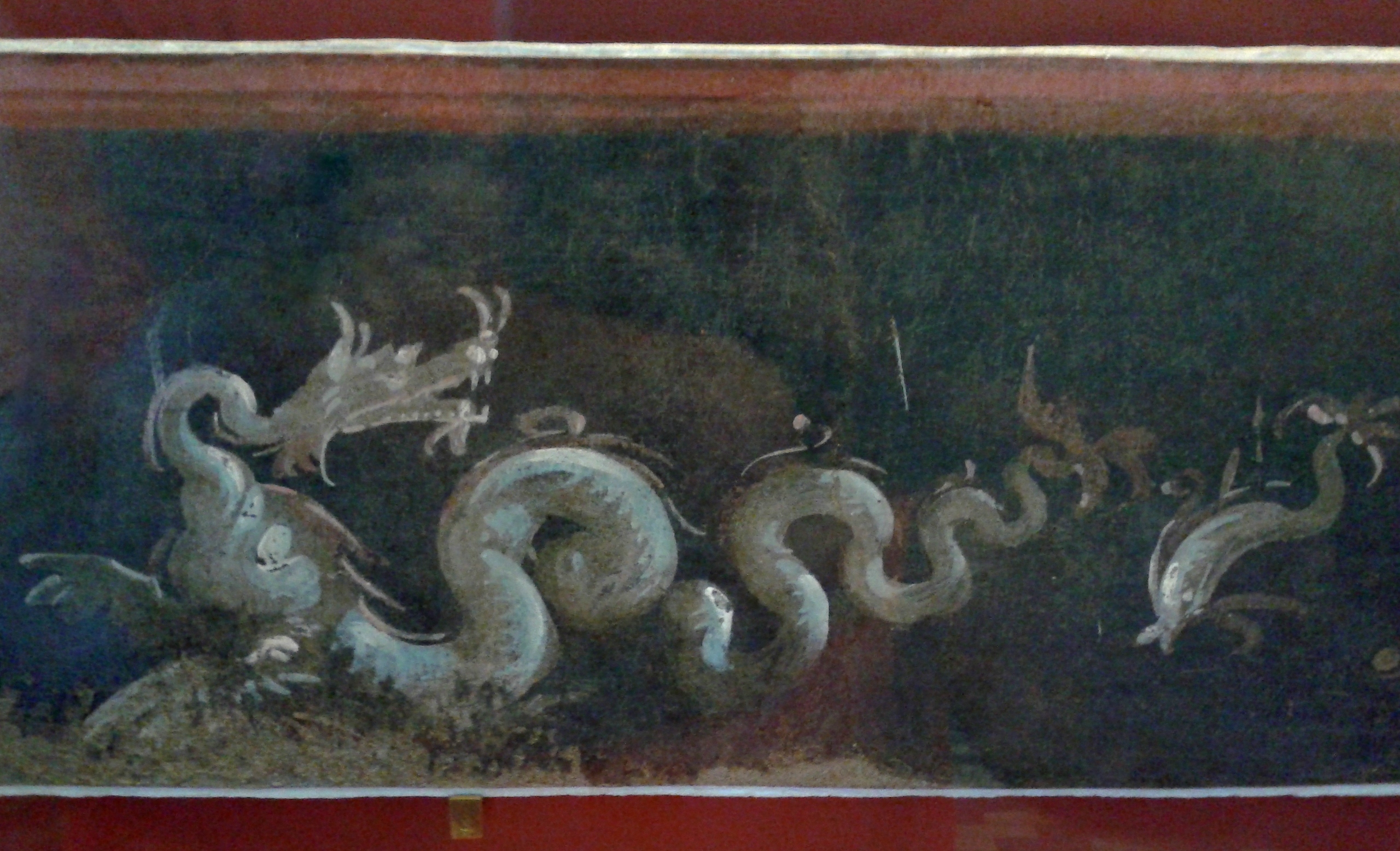
Pompeii fresco

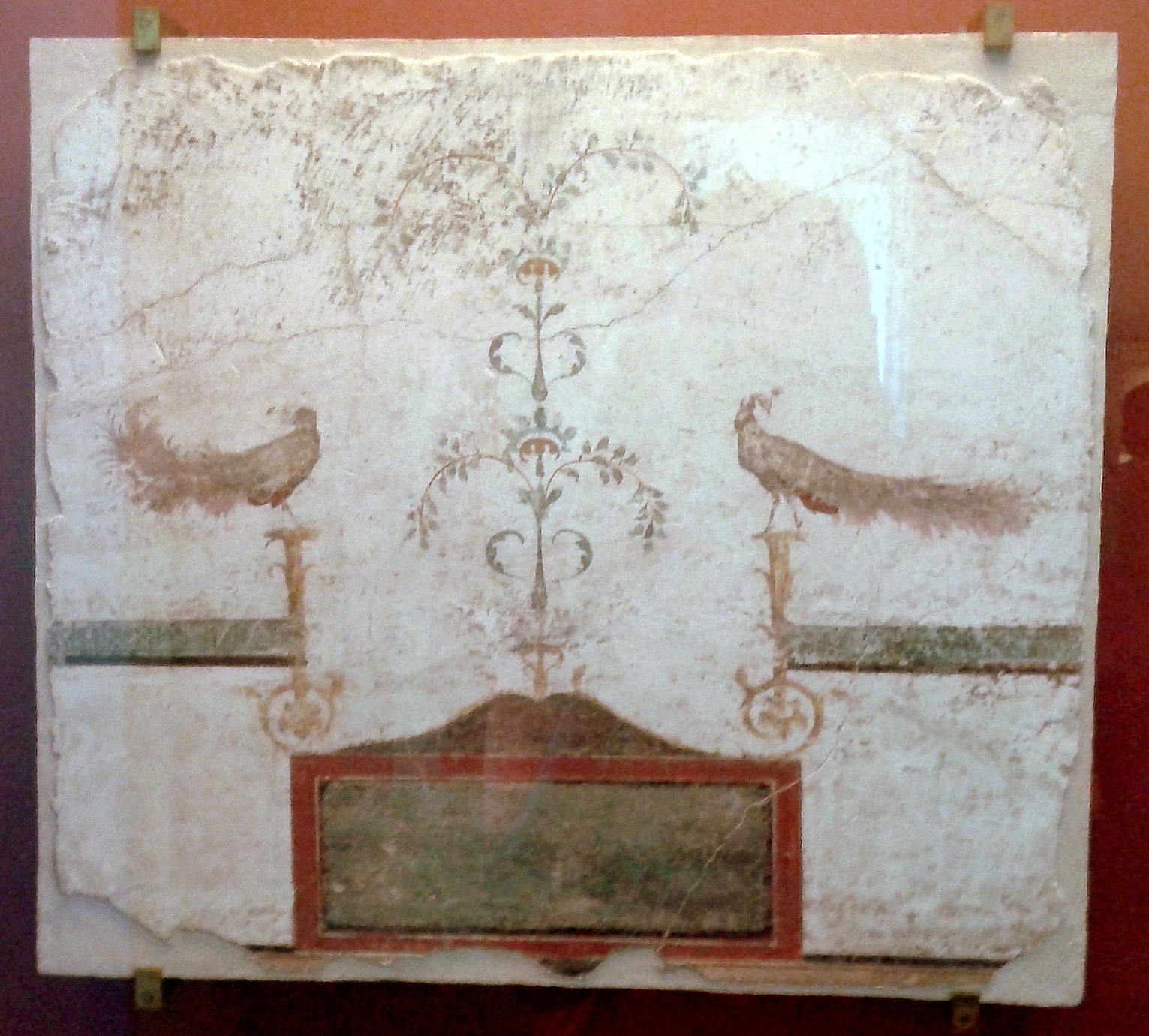
Pompeii fresco

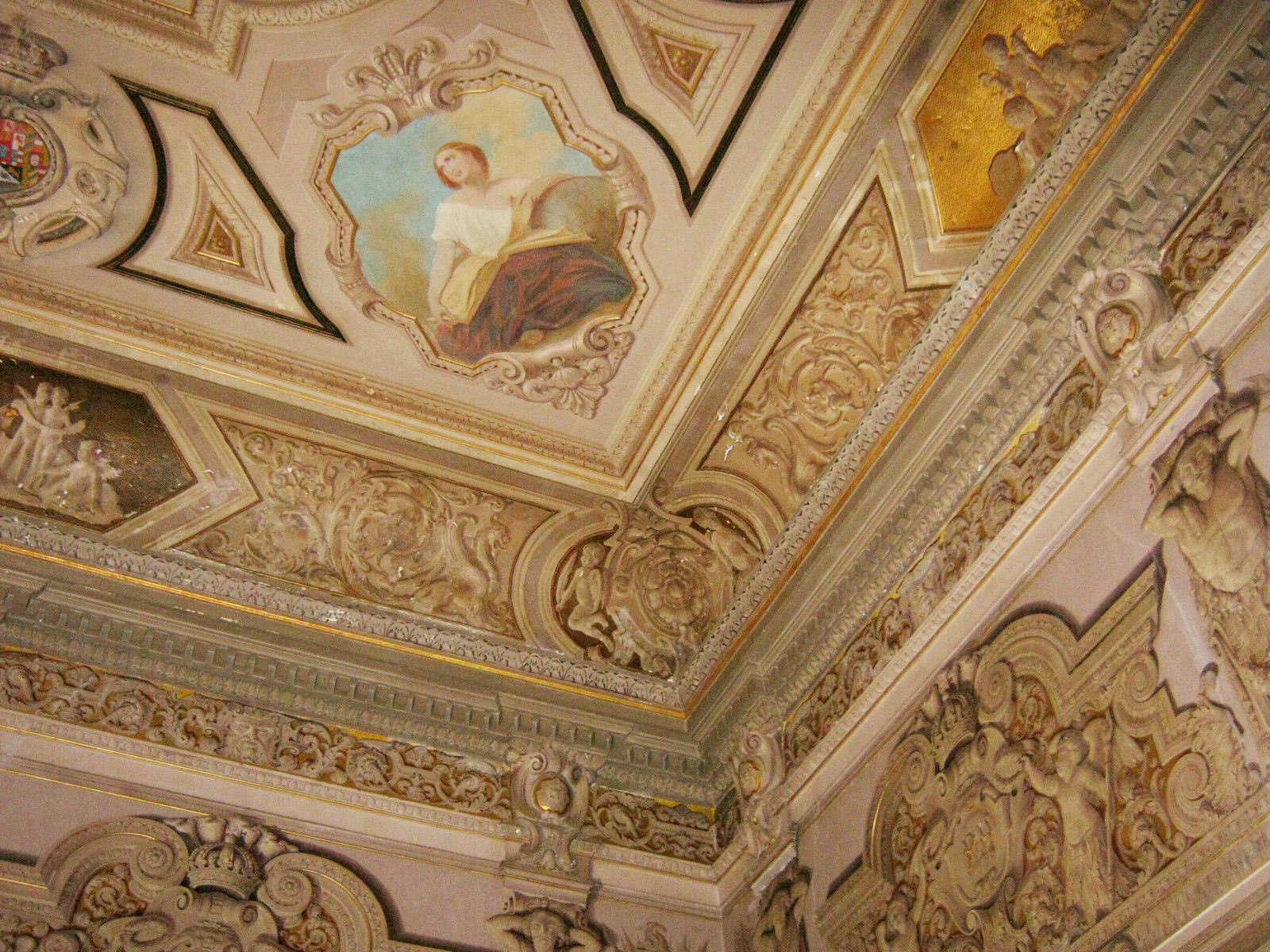
Historic artwork of the interior

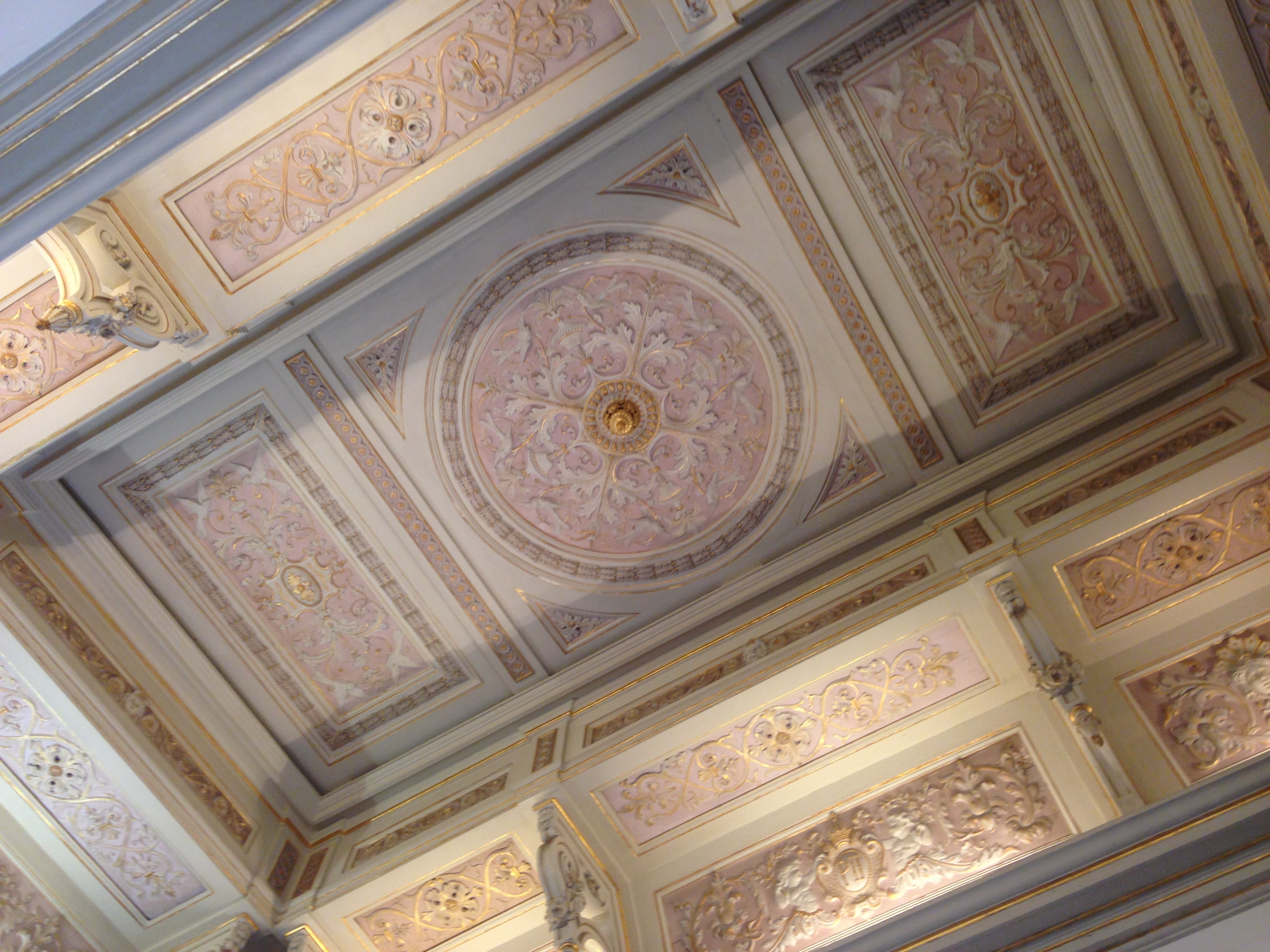
Ceiling artwork

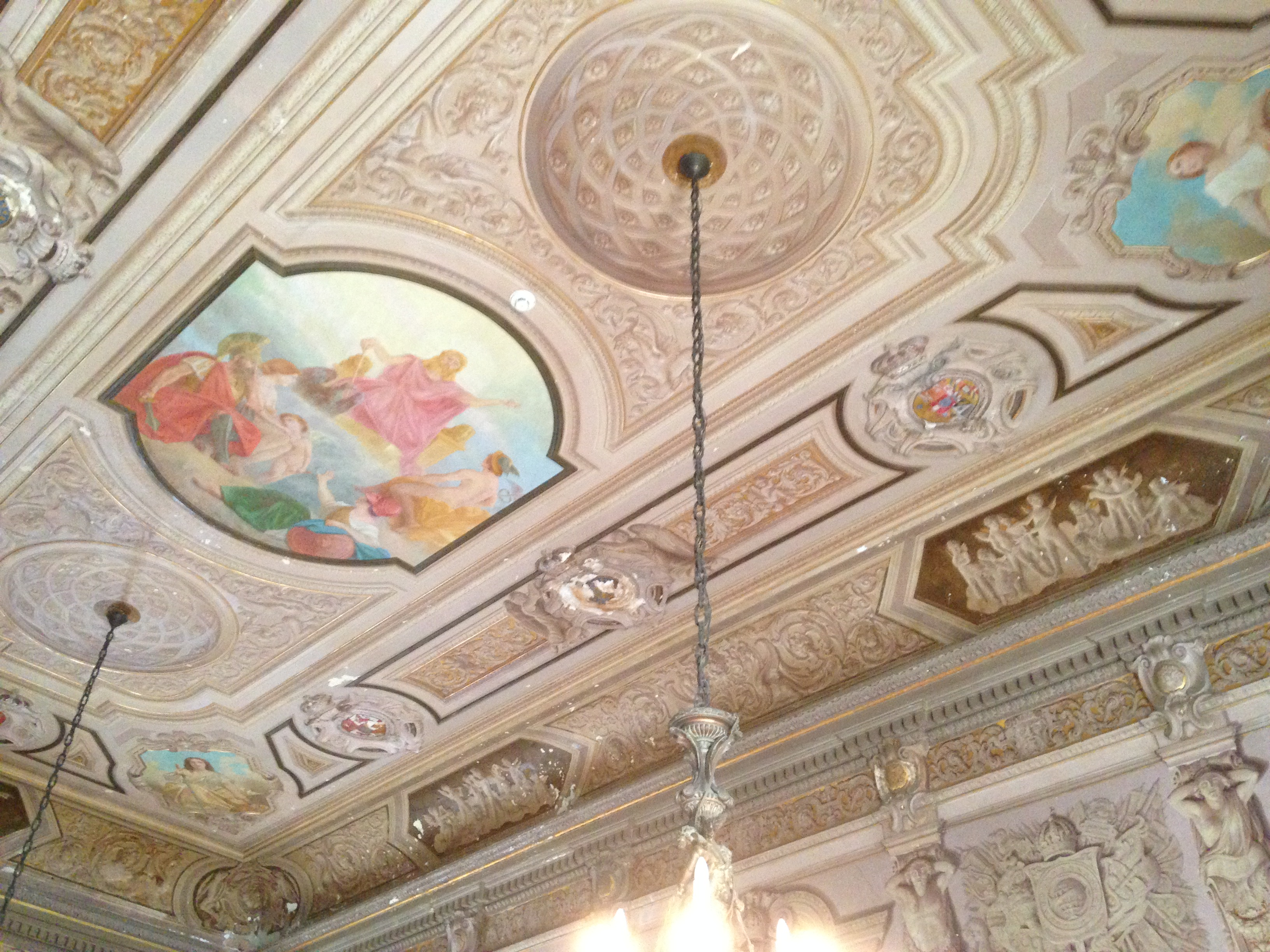
Ceiling artwork

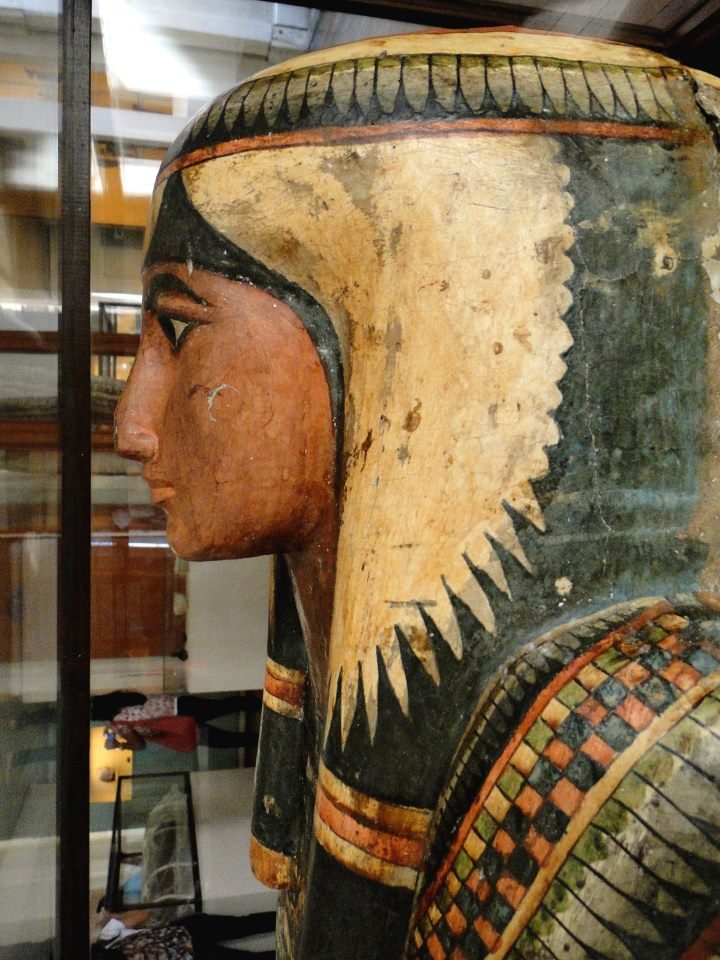
Sarcophagus of Sha-Amun-en-su

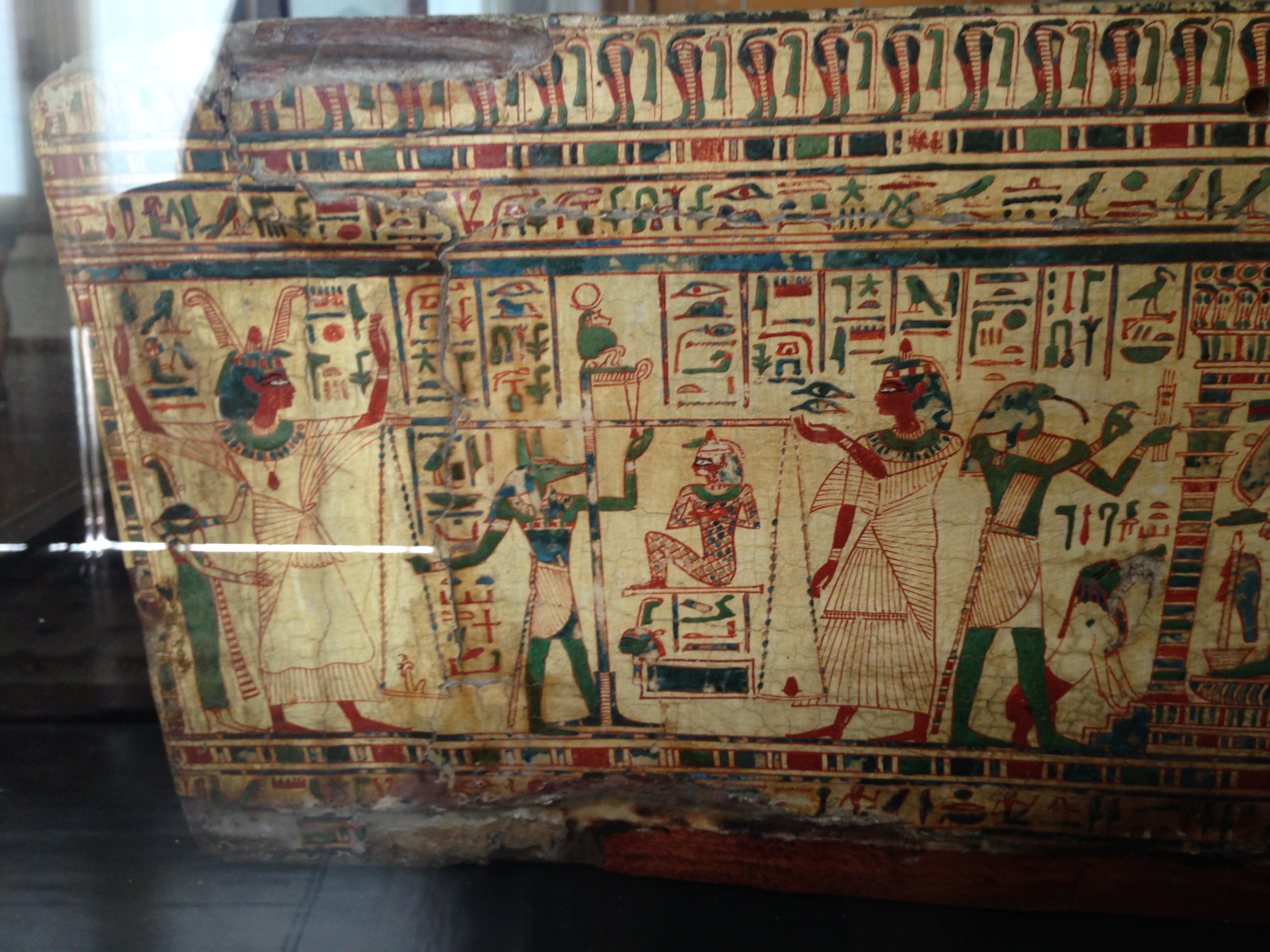
Artwork of an Egyptian sarcophagus

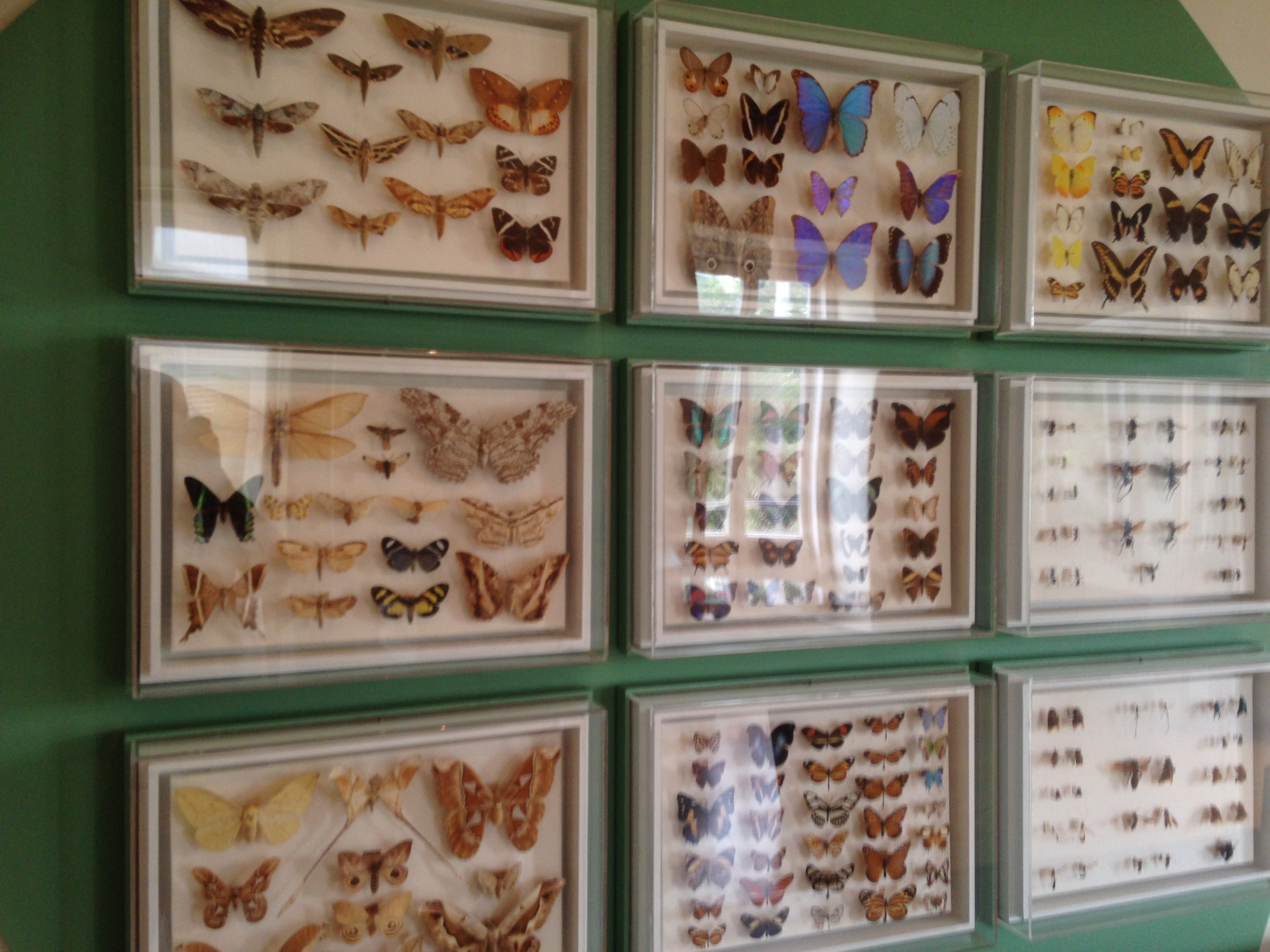
Butterflies on display

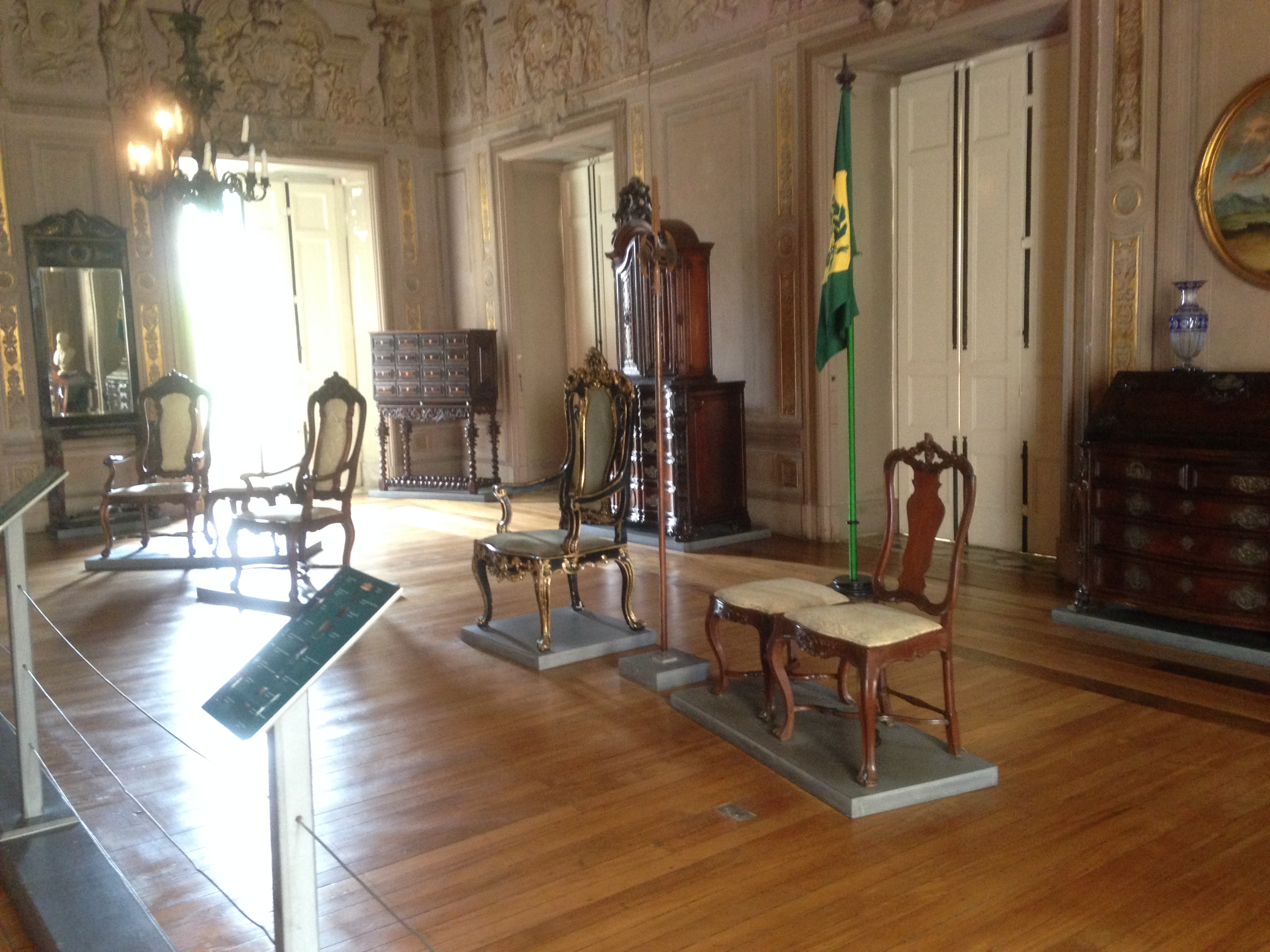
The throne room, on display in preserved rooms in the front wings of the museum

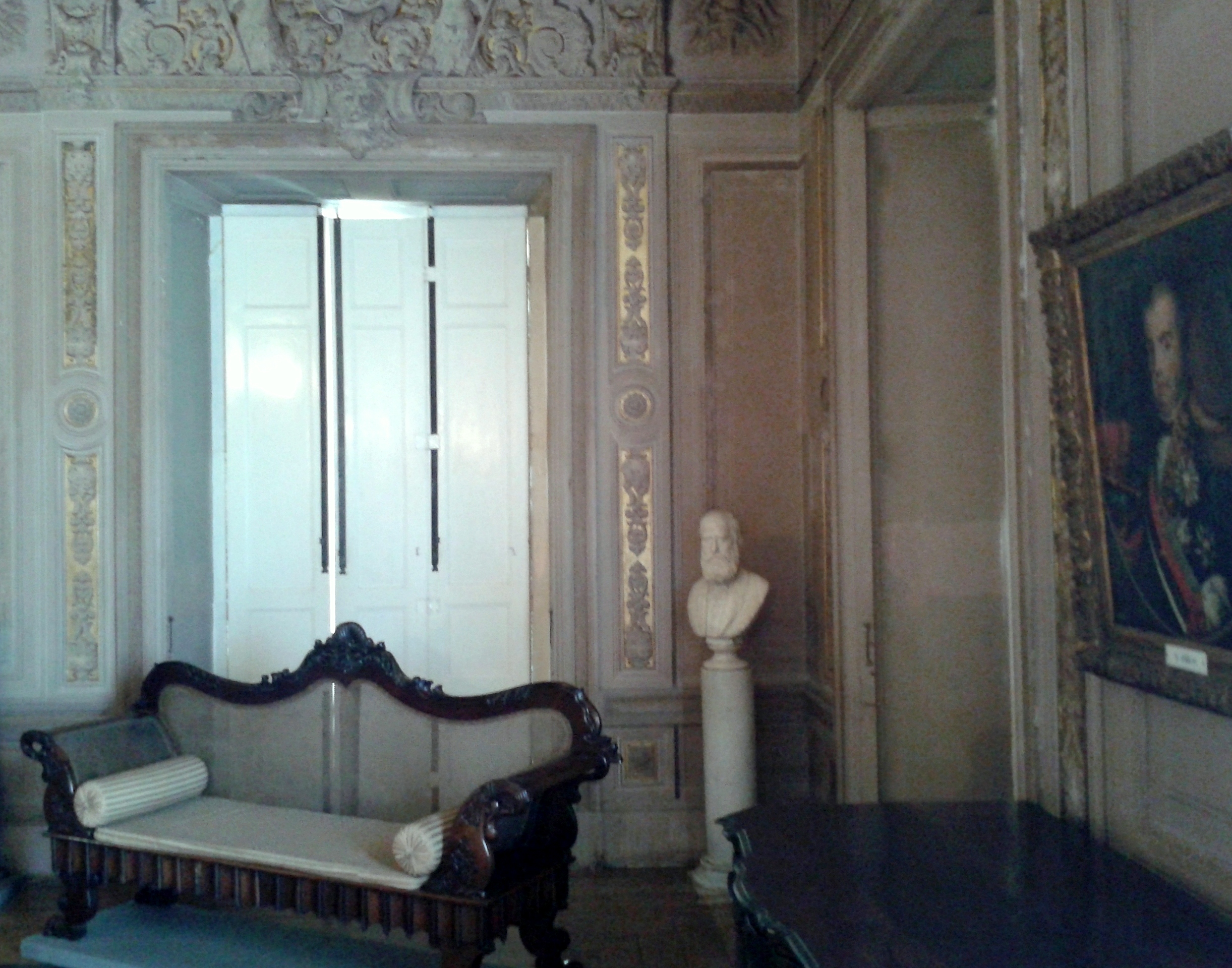
Part of the preserved throne room

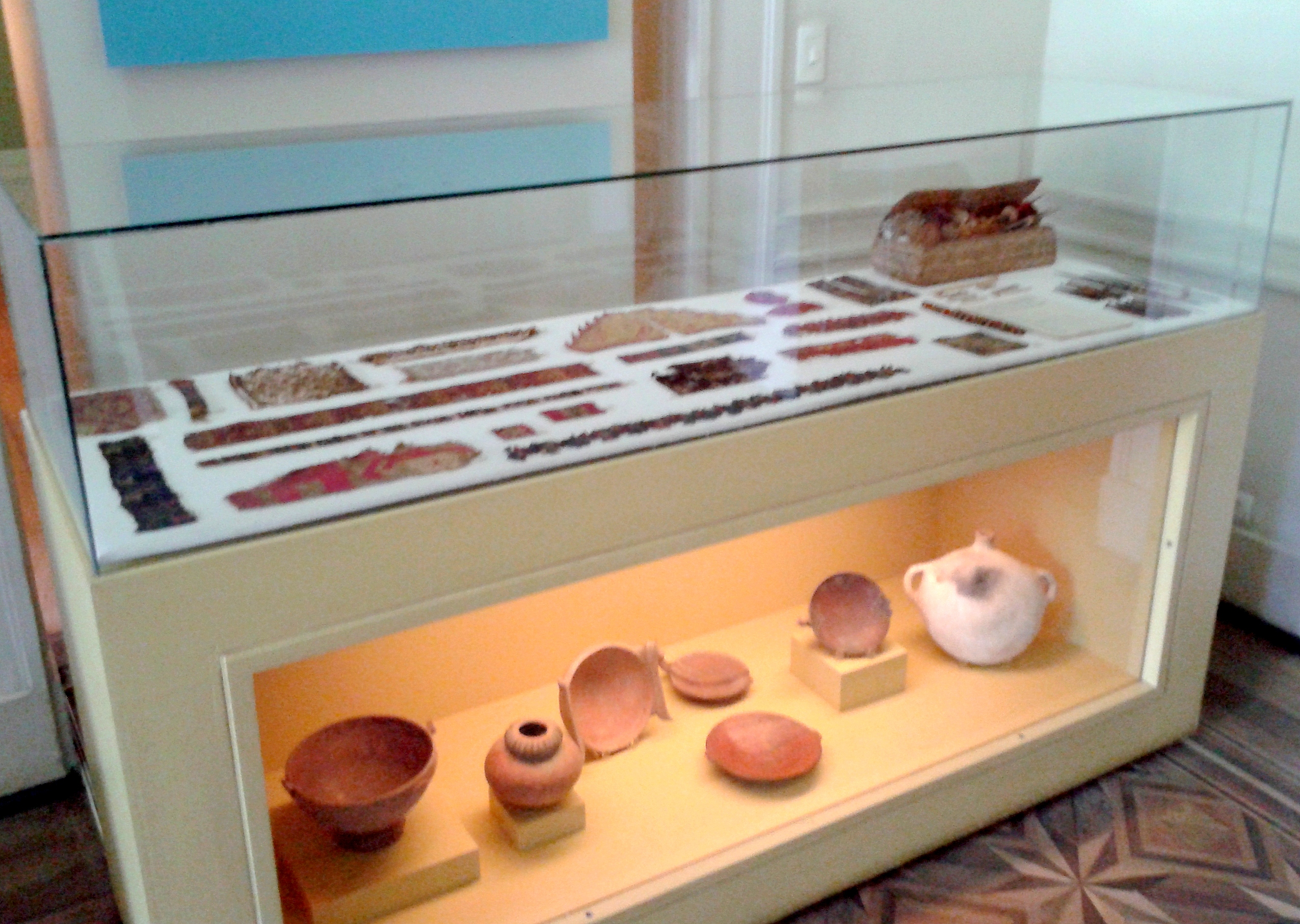
Pre-Columbian artifacts

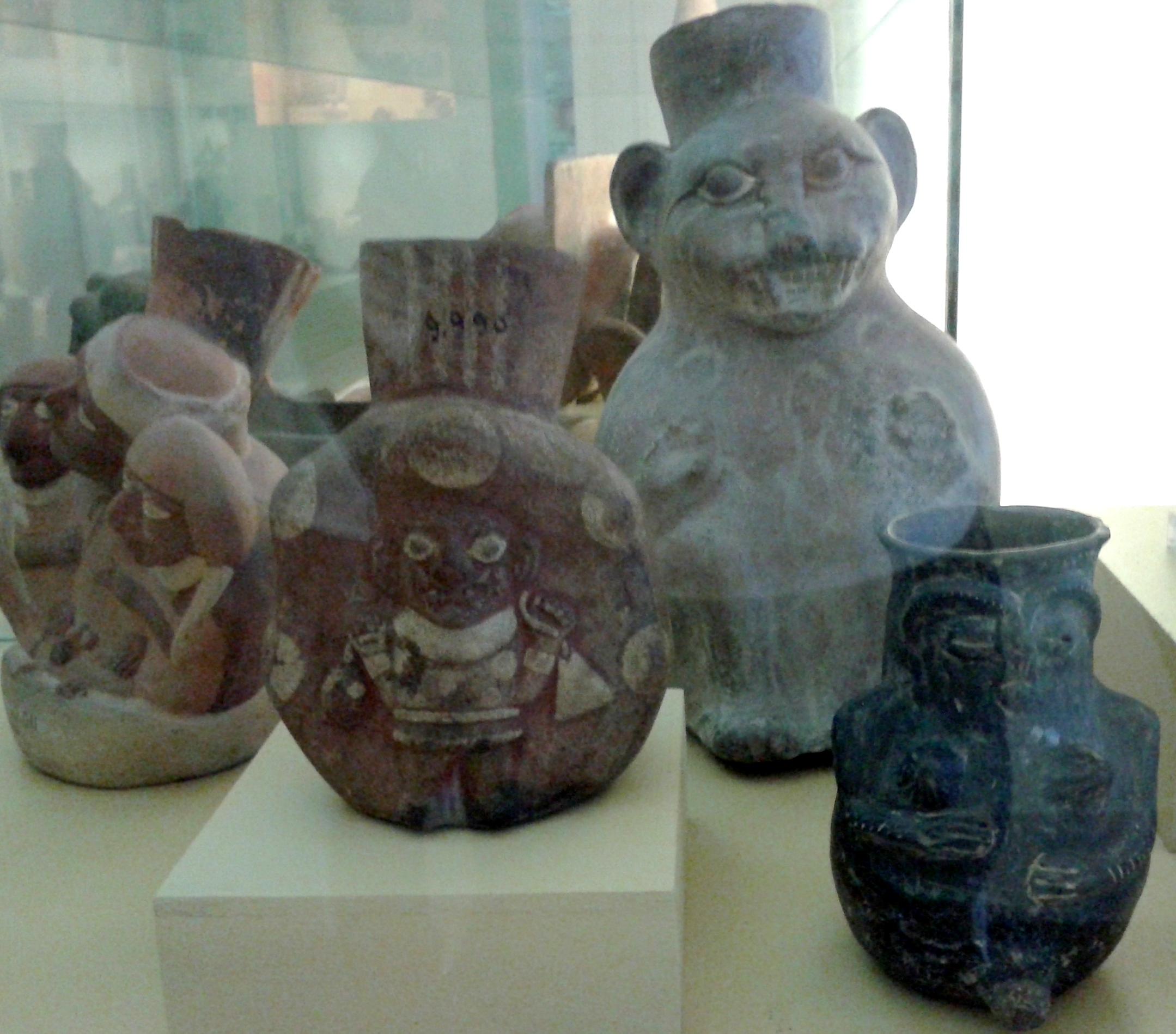
Pre-Columbian jars and ceramics

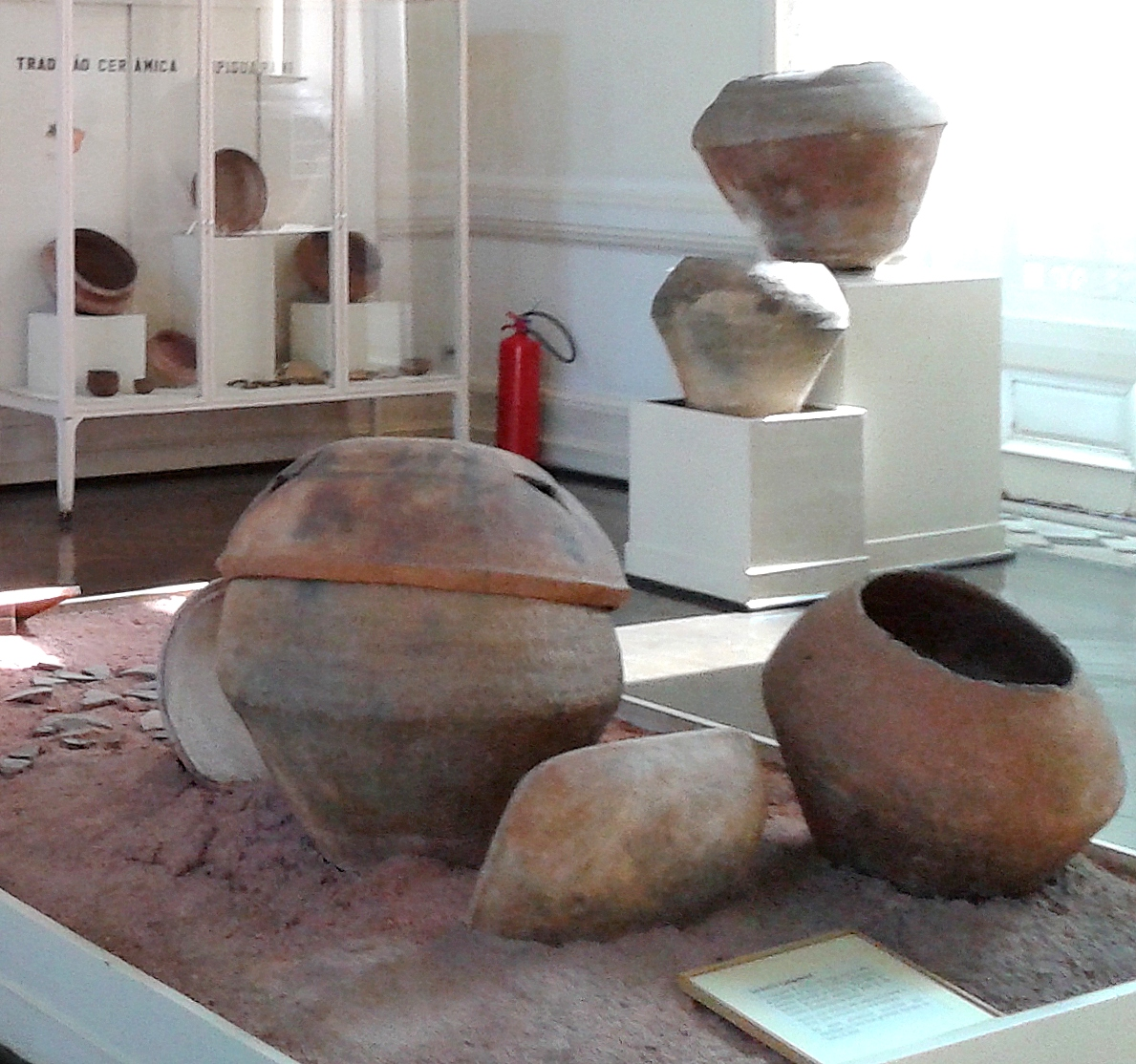
Tupi-guarani

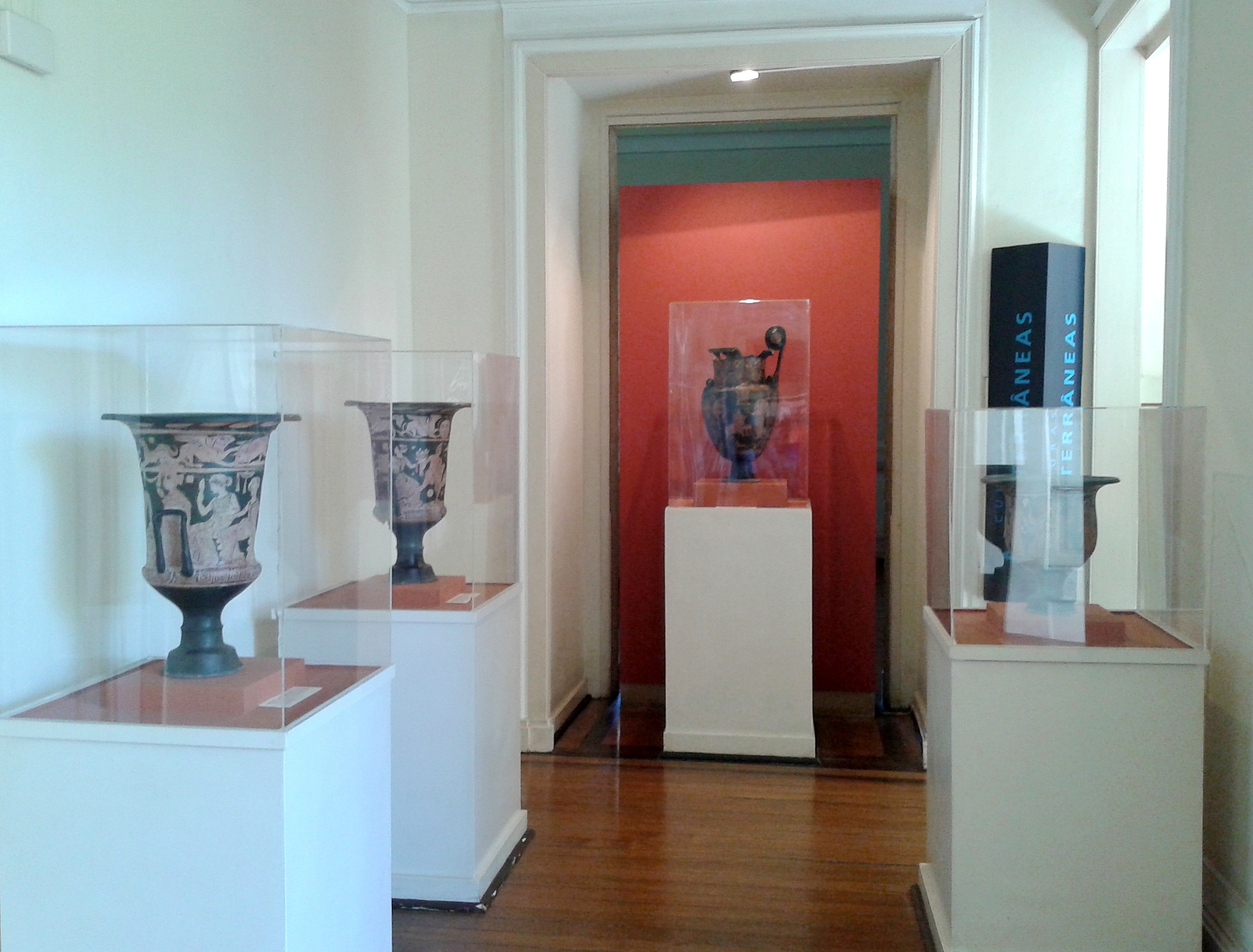
Ancient Greek vases

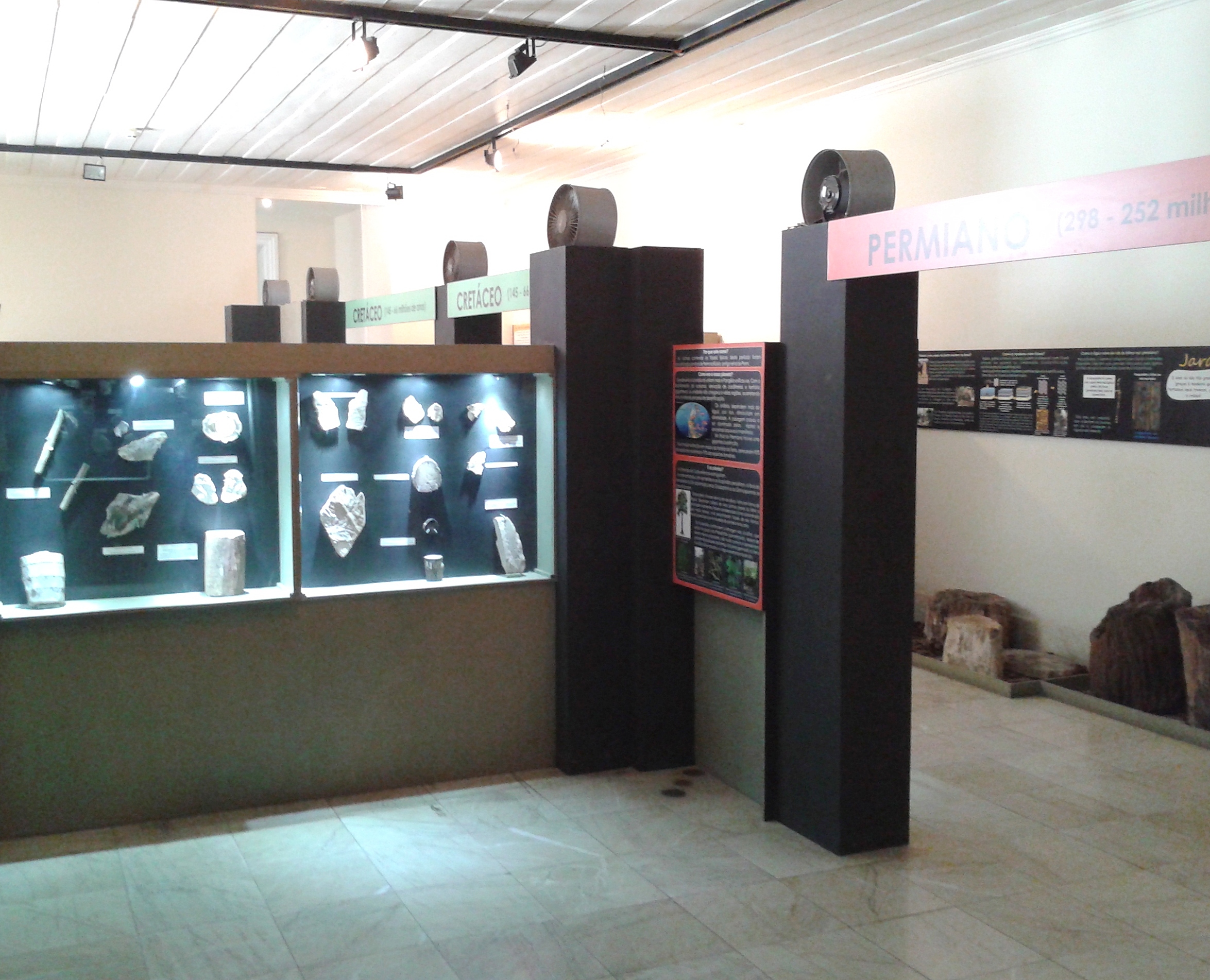
Paleontological tools

== Financial difficulties ==
From 2014 the museum faced budget cuts that dropped its maintenance to less than R$ 520,000 annually. The budget was so low, there was US$ 0.01 to spend on each of the artifacts. The building fell into disrepair, evidenced by peeling wall material, exposed electrical wiring, and termite infestation. By June 2018, the museum's 200th anniversary, it had reached a state of near-complete abandonment. There was an offer from the World Bank to lend the museum funds, which was turned down because the Federal University of Rio de Janeiro would have to give up control to an independent Board.

According to the dean of UFRJ, Denise Pires de Carvalho, the university does not have the money to pay bills of light delayed since January 2019, of water since 2 years, of security and cleaning services. She also said that although they do not have any more money available, she would seek the release of 20% of the R$43 million released by the parliamentary bench in Rio de Janeiro to continue the reconstruction works of the National Museum. It aimed to reopen at least one wing of the palace in 2022, the year of independence bicentennial.

== 2018 fire ==
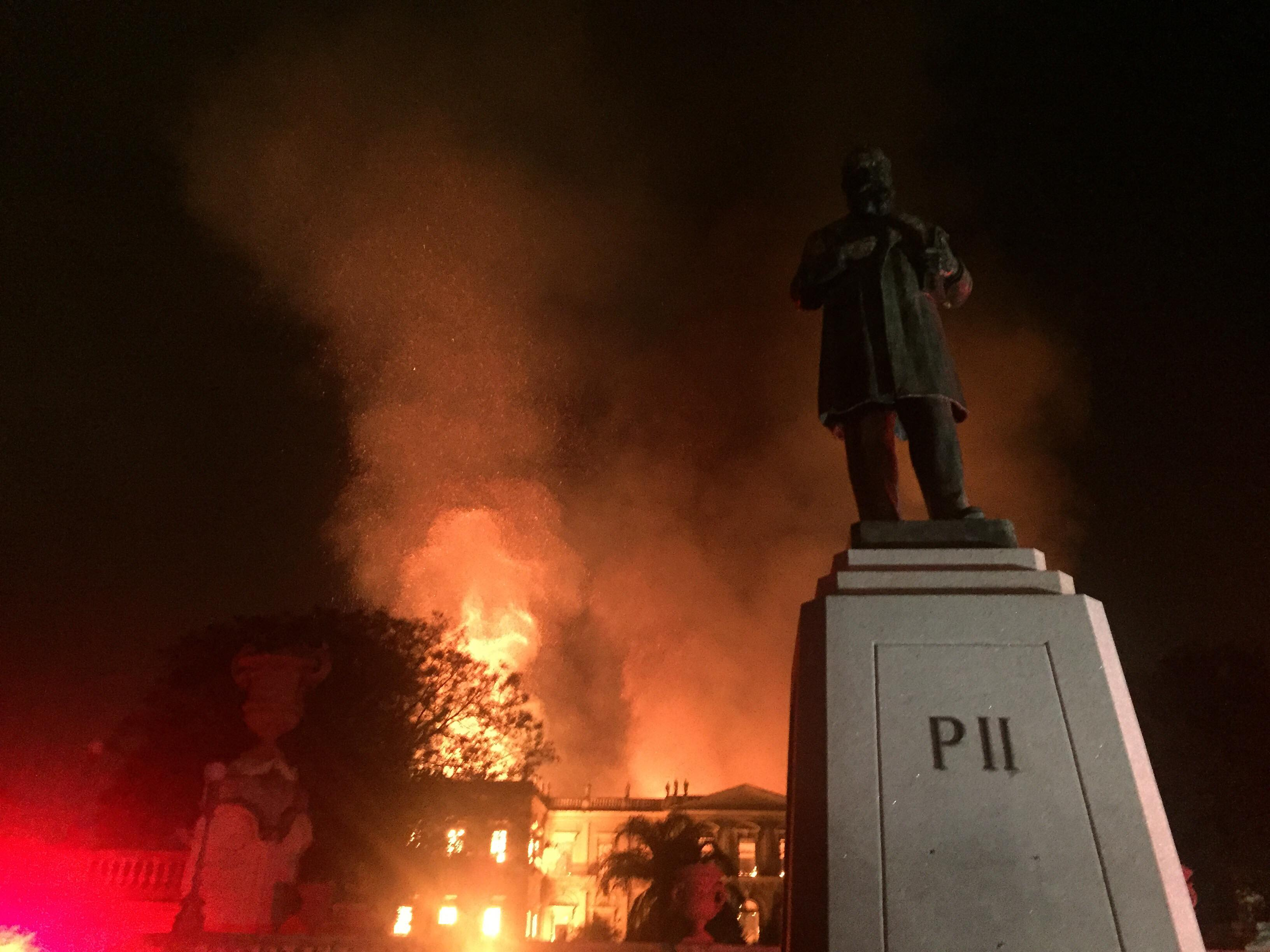
The National Museum building burning behind the statue of Emperor Pedro II

The museum was heavily damaged by a large fire which began about 19:30 local time (23:30 UTC) on 2 September 2018. Although some items were saved, it is believed that 92% of its archive of 20 million items was destroyed in the fire. The small number of unscathed items were stored in a separate building which was not damaged.

The fire is believed to have started from a malfunctioning air conditioner, and was exacerbated by years of neglect to the building and surrounding infrastructure. First responders fighting the fire were hindered by a lack of water. Rio's fire chief said two nearby fire hydrants had insufficient water, leaving firefighters to resort to pumping water from a nearby lake. According to a CEDAE (Rio de Janeiro's Water and Sewerage State Company) employee, although the hydrants did have water, the water pressure was very low because the building is on top of a hill, making them unusable. Brazilian president Michel Temer said that the loss due to the fire was "incalculable."

== Reconstruction ==
During the signing of a protocol of intent for technical-scientific cooperation with the Brazilian Institute of Museums (Ibram), held on 14 May 2019, it was reported that the works of restoration of the patrimony would be initiated in 2019, with an elaborated executive project of the reconstruction of the facades and of the roof, with an endowment of R$1 million. Paulo Amaral, president of Ibram, said that the new concept of the National Museum would probably be announced in April 2020, when the final formatting of the space would be defined, with parts dedicated to the historical collection, contemporary works and equipment.

On the first floor of the building was the Francisca Keller Library, which had the largest collection of anthropology and human sciences in South America. To speed up the fundraising process, they are making a crowdfunding campaign on the Benfeitoria platform. The money would be used for the demolition of the interior walls of the space, restoring the floor, finishing and painting, laying the ceiling, making the electrical and air conditioning installation and the restoration of hardware. They expect to get R$129,000 by 12 September 2019.

The Federal University of Rio de Janeiro, responsible for the museum, signed on Saturday 31 August 2019 a memorandum of understanding with the Vale Foundation, the United Nations Educational, Scientific and Cultural Organization (UNESCO) and the BNDES to create a governance steering committee that can lead the museum's recovery project. Vale provides R$50 million and BNDES R$21.7 million for this reconstruction. The Ministry of Education had allocated R$16 million to the National Museum. Of this total, R$8.9 million was used in emergency works, and the rest for facade and roof projects. The Ministry of Science, Technology, Innovations and Communications contributed R$10 million to acquire equipment for scientific research and infrastructure actions. Germany had donated 230,000 euros so far. After 1 year since the destruction, 44% of the museum's collections had been saved. More than 50 of the 70 areas hit by the fire were searched.

Reconstruction of the facade and roof is expected to take place between the end of 2019 and the beginning of 2020. In the first half of 2020, the salvage of parts of the collection and the start of the inventory process are expected to be completed. R$69 million in public funds for the project. The amount is composed of R$21 million from BNDES (R$3.3 million of which have already been released), R$43 million from the amendment of the Rio de Janeiro bench in the Chamber of Deputies and R$5 million from the Ministry Education.

On 3 October 2019, the museum has about 120 million reais available to make works, coming from funds from parliamentary amendments, the BNDES and Vale. But, the money cannot be used to buy the material needed to continue the rescue, only in the works. In the box of the Association Friends of the National Museum, there are 80 thousand reais in cash, coming from donations, but only R$25 thousand are not yet committed. The Rio de Janeiro Legislative Assembly (Alerj) donated R$20 million to help in the works. Funding are available as project steps are completed.

The museum reopened on 2 July 2025, while renovations are expected to be completed by the end of 2027.

== Donations ==
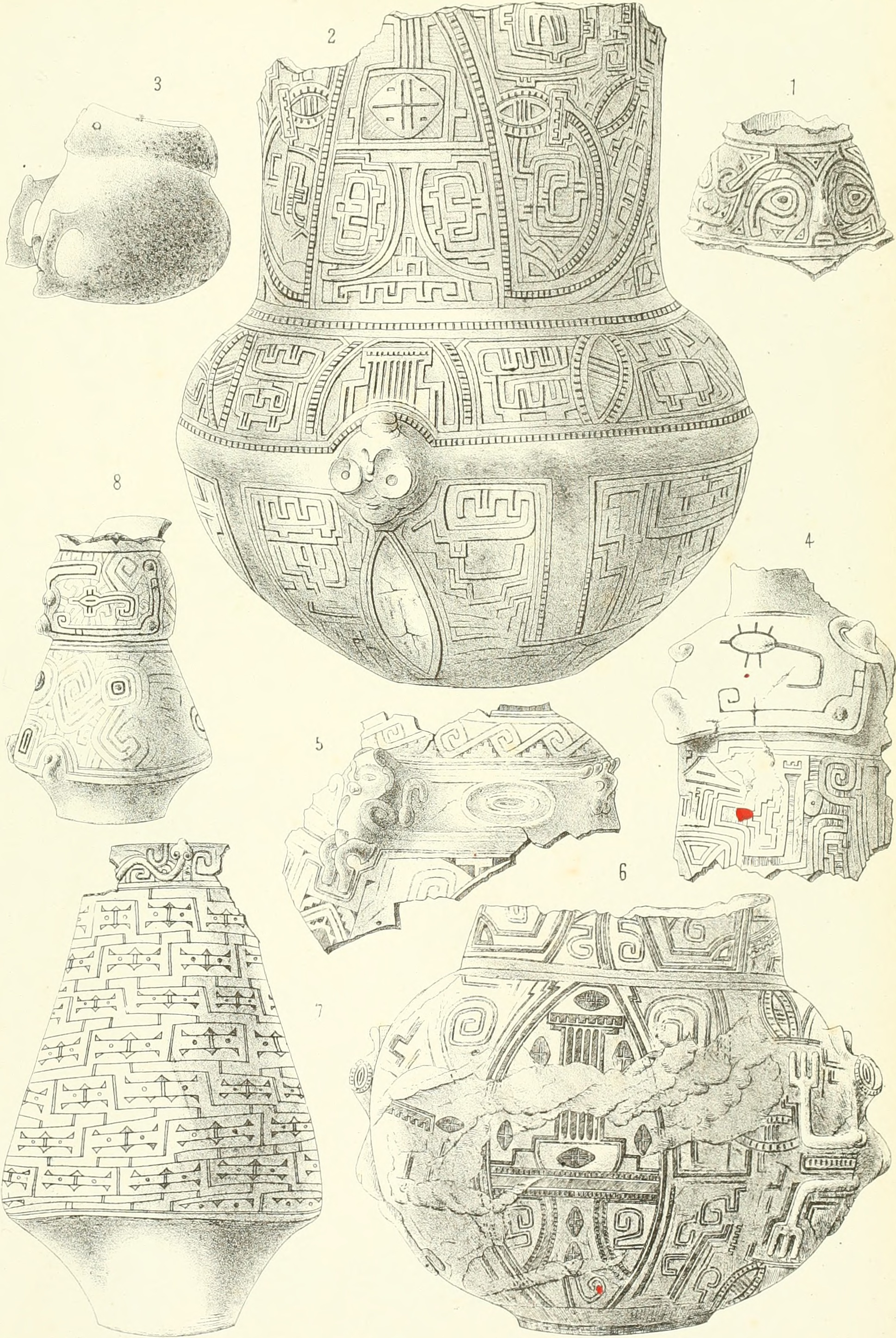
Drawings showing ancient vases

- The German Foreign Ministry offered €1 million in aid to rebuild Brazil's National Museum. This amount was used to buy container-laboratories to investigate specimens. Those equipment were to be located in a donated field nearby Maracanã Stadium. From the initial amount announced, R$180 thousand was delivered. On 21 May 2019 the director travelled to Germany and France to ask for the rest and more help, because the Brazilian government seemed not possible to financially further help. From Germany, the second amount of €145 thousand or R$654 thousand was donated.
- Each of 140 geoparks of UNESCO's conservation areas collected and sent a lithic, fossil, or cultural artifact to Brazil. A total of 140 objects were donated for the future collection.
- On 17 October 2018, Secretary of the Patrimony of the Union, Sidrack Correia confirmed the donation of the area of 49,300 m², that is about a kilometer from the museum, to install laboratories containers in 45 days, budgeted at R$2.2 million, purchased with funds from the TJRJ Pecuniary Penalty Fund to be used by museum researchers. It also serves as a center for students visitation. Part of the total, 10 thousand square meters will be for the Justice Court to install its transport area.
- The National Institute of Industrial Property (INPI), linked to the Ministry of Industry, Foreign Trade and Services (MDIC), concluded on 17 October 2018 the donation of 1,164 items, mostly mobile, to the National Museum. The furniture, which includes tables, chairs, workstations, drawers and cabinets, aid in the restructuring of the museum. The idea of the donation came from the need for the institute to free itself of idle equipment that was in its old headquarters, in Edifício A Noite, located in Praça Mauá, the port area of Rio de Janeiro, to allow the return of the property to the Secretariat of the Patrimony of the Union (SPU), which should have been empty. Part of the furniture was taken to the Botanical Garden of the National Museum, located in Quinta da Boa Vista, where some sectors are working. Others will be used in the direction of the museum, in the services of museology and teaching assistance, and in the departments of invertebrates, geology, paleontology, entomology and ethnology.
- On 24 October 2018, a farmer from Cuiabá donated 780 old Brazilian coins at an average value of R$5 thousand to Rio de Janeiro National Museum. More than R$100 thousand was donated in campaign to museum.
- On 13 November 2018, the Universidade Estadual do Pará donated 514 insects to the museum, 314 were borrowed from there. Among them were grasshoppers.
- On 25 May 2019, Nuuvem, the largest gaming platform in Latin America, donated R$16,860 to the National Museum. The two-day income from the game "The Hero's Legend" was reverted to the museum and 500 gamers engaged in the action. The inspiration came from an initiative that Ubisoft created for the game "Assassin's Creed" for the reconstruction of the Cathedral of Notre-Dame de Paris.
- Until June 2019, small donations from several private individuals summed R$323 thousand.
- The British Council donated R$150 thousand for educational exchange.
- The Royal Botanic Gardens, Kew donated in 2020 a collection of relics collected in the Amazon, stored in the British institution for over 150 years. The items were grouped by botanist Richard Spruce, who spent 15 years gathering specimens and making notes while travelling through the forest and brought to Queen Victoria ceremonial tools and objects used by indigenous tribes in the region. His collection, later stored in the Kew Gardens archives, also included wooden baskets and graters, trumpets, rattles, and ritual headdresses.
- Wilson Saviano, professor at the Oswaldo Cruz Foundation, donated 300 pieces, 15 paintings and 40 books from his private collection of contemporary African art.
- Books: In entomology, the museum received 20 donations consisting of about 23,000 items. In vertebrates, more than 500 specimens from various areas of Brazil were donated. In geology and paleontology, it had assets seized by the IRS that were destined for the National Museum. The Francisca Keller Library of the Graduate Program in Social Anthropology, which had 37,000 documents and books and was fully incinerated, was under reconstruction. About 10,500 volumes were donated, and another 8,000 were forthcoming. From France came approximately 700 volume. At the Central Library the donation of several other books, reached over 170 volumes.
- In 2024, the museum received a 17th-century sacred feathered cloak that was taken to Denmark in 1689 from the Tupinambá people of Brazil and was repatriated by the National Museum of Denmark in Copenhagen.

== Political influences ==
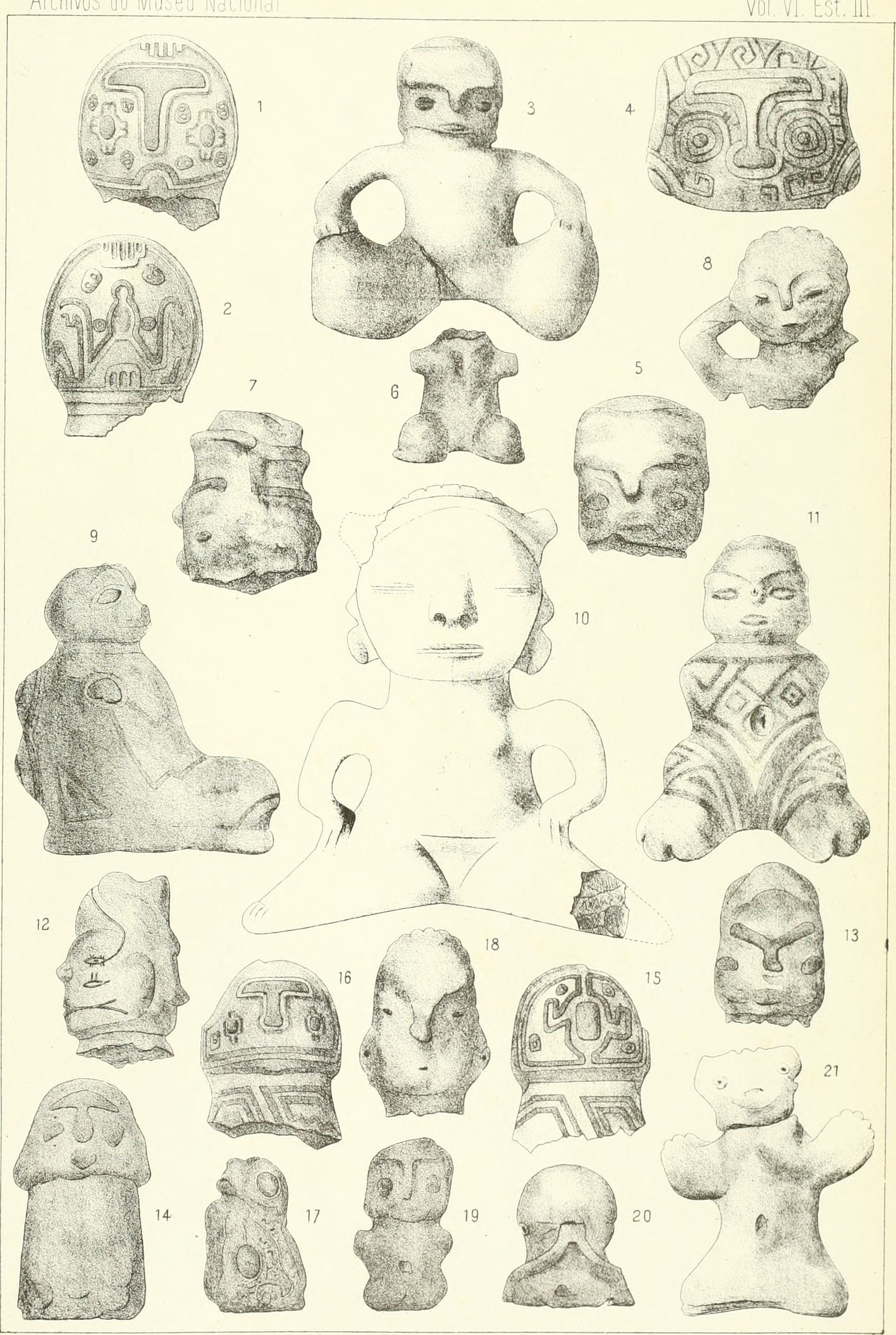
Figures which had been in the museum

The director of the National Museum, Alexander W. A. Kellner, issued an open letter addressed to presidential candidates Jair Messias Bolsonaro and Fernando Haddad on the evening of 15 October 2018, which, along two pages, reinforces the historical importance of the institution, and recalls that his survival is tied to the responsibility of those who hold "power in the hands."

The document was also sent to the National Congress, where he had regularly gone to ask for a public hearing, during which he asked for the inclusion of resources for the museum, and for the next budget. Without these resources, he says the institution will end up harming decades of research.

In the letter, the director says that many reflect on what could have been done differently to avoid a disaster that led to the loss of an invaluable patrimony, involving millions of cultural and scientific pieces. He also adds that "others should be deeply reflecting on why, being in a position of decision, they did not act firmly in triggering actions that would have avoided the absurdity of that loss".

On 17 October 2018, the director of the museum had a meeting with federal deputies to first resolve the R$50 million needed to reinstall the front part of Palace. In late October 2018, the museum's director attended an audience in Brasília at the Chamber of Deputies in order to secure R$56 million for the basic reconstruction of the front part of main building, No. 1, including the facade, roof and its structure. He negotiated the money before the President-elect Jair Bolsonaro, being afraid that the building would remain destroyed for years in an abandoned state. Also, the laboratory containers were not received. On 31 October 2018, the Chamber of Deputies approved an amendment of R$55 million to the budget of 2019. This would need to be further approved by a joint committee and also by the plenary. The director travelled to China to guarantee pieces of collections for the museum. During his travel to Germany, specifically Berlin, Munich and Paris, France to bargain some money, the amount of R$55 million, supposed to reconstruct some part of building was reduced to R$43 million by the government. However the Louvre Museum could lend some Egyptian pieces to be displayed in Rio de Janeiro, when its reconstruction comes done. From this sum, until June 2019, Education Ministry or Ministério da Educação (MEC) paid R$908.800,00 for the facade project.

A proposal by Senator Maria do Carmo Alves (DEM-SE), under review in the Commission of Education, Culture and Sport proposes to include a National Day of the Museum, in the official Brazilian calendar to be celebrated on 18 May.

Until December 2018, the concern was the change of the Brazilian government, because none of the transition teams of the future governor of Rio de Janeiro, nor incoming president Jair Bolsonaro have sought the direction of the museum to talk about the fire. Even then, the containers to store restored objects, until the reconstruction work is completed, had not yet been delivered by the Federal University of Rio de Janeiro, which did not express its opinion on the delay.

== Recent events ==
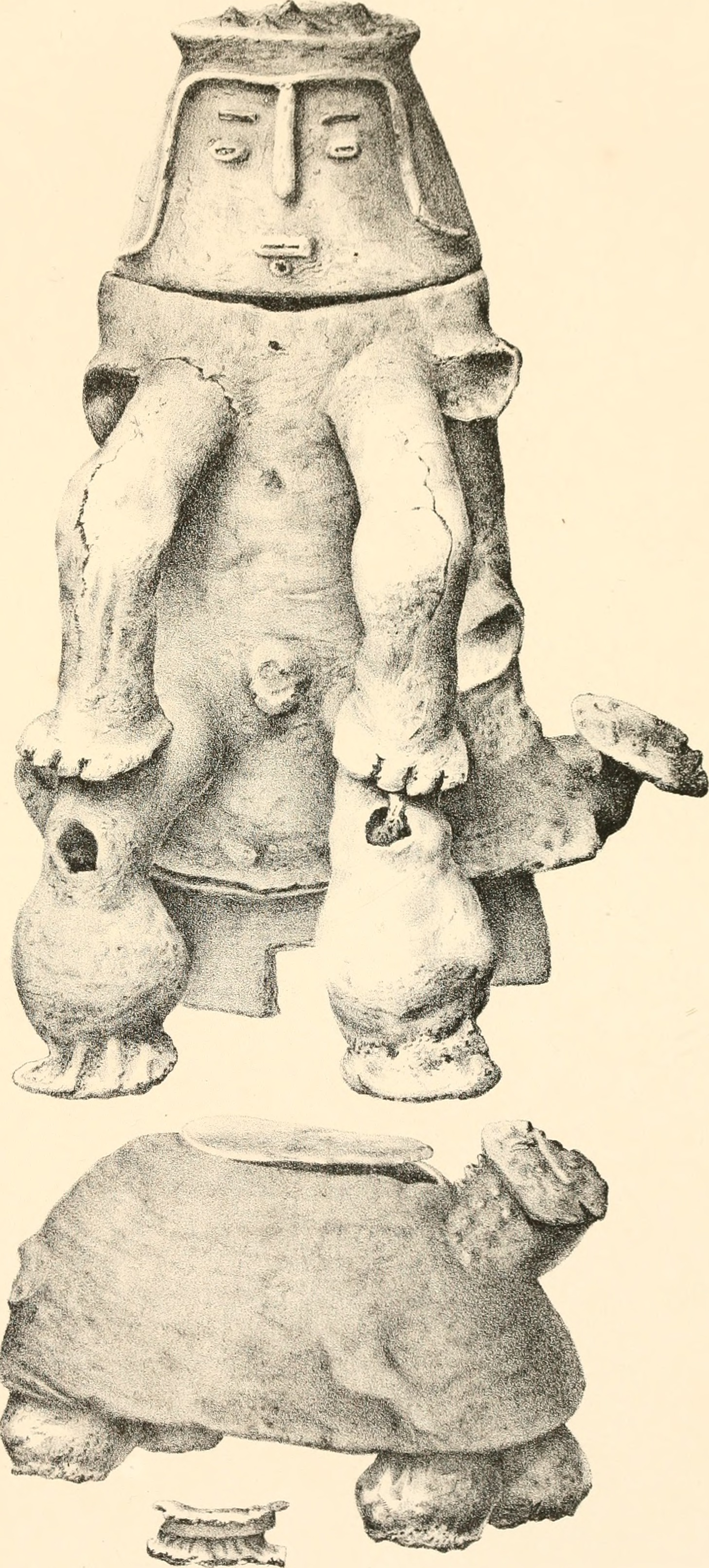
The top of this piece, the head, was recovered

During the three months after the fire debris was removed, the "economic support network" promised by the president was not established. The partnership to help the museum would count on the participation of the Brazilian Federation of Banks (Febraban), Petrobrás, Bradesco, Itaú, Santander, Caixa, Banco do Brasil, BNDES and Vale. According to the entity, the banks are awaiting approval of Provisional Measure 851 in the National Congress to be able to make the donations. The text must be approved by Congress until February 2019. If this does not happen, the Provisional Measure loses its validity. "The first disbursement of the contract between the BNDES, the Association of Friends of the National Museum and UFRJ, with a total execution period of four years, was scheduled for October 2018 of R$ 3 million."

In June 2018, when the National Museum completed 200 years, the BNDES signed a R$21.7 million contract to pay for the update of the building, but before the first transfer of R$3 million, it caught fire. The agreement was maintained, and the BNDES promised that the money would be used to support the reconstruction works. That was not done. Until final of 2018, only R$8.9 million was released to carry out emergency works for the reconstruction of the building.

The Ministry of Education (MEC) gave R$5 million to a second phase of elaboration of recovery project of the Museum. Unesco personnel and the Ministry of Foreign Affairs visited the debris. Another R$2.5 million was allocated to the research of the institution through the Coordination of Improvement of Higher Education Personnel (Capes).

Among the rubble, 1,500 items were found, between parts of the collection, equipment, personal property and others not unidentifiable. Among them were pieces from the Egyptian collection and minerals from the Werner collection, that came to Brazil along with the Portuguese Crown, as well as pre-Columbian ceramics.

A partnership with Google Brasil, through Google Arts & Culture, allowed guided virtual tours via internet of 160 items from the collections in 2016.

== See also ==
- List of directors of the National Museum of Brazil
- National Historical Museum of Brazil
- Paço de São Cristóvão, the historic palace that houses the National Museum
- Wikipedia:Notice on the National Museum
