= Émil Goeldi =

Swiss-Brazilian naturalist and zoologist (1859–1917)

Émil August Goeldi
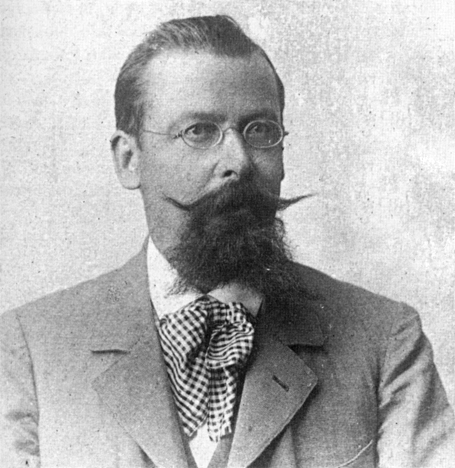
- Born: 28 August 1859; Ennetbühl, Upper Toggenburg District, Sankt Gallen, Switzerland
- Died: 5 July 1917 (aged 57); Bern, Switzerland
- Other names: Göldi, Emilio Augusto Goeldi
- Citizenship: Switzerland; Brazil
- Education: Friedrich Schiller Universität, Jena; Universität Leipzig
- Known for: Reorganizer of the Goeldi Museum in Brazil
- Children: Oswaldo Goeldi
- Awards: Life-Director of museum renamed for him
- Scientific career
- Fields: Zoology, Archaeology, Public health
- Workplaces: Museu Paraense Emílio Goeldi, Brazil
- Patrons: Pedro II of Brazil
- Doctoral advisor: Ernst Heinrich Philipp August Haeckel
- Other academic advisors: Karl Georg Friedrich Rudolph Leuckart
- Author abbrev. (botany): Goeldi
- Author abbrev. (zoology): Goeldi

Émil August Goeldi (var. Göldi, Portuguese var. Emílio Augusto Goeldi) (28 August 1859 – 5 July 1917 in Bern), was a Swiss-Brazilian naturalist and zoologist. He was the father of Oswaldo Goeldi, a noted Brazilian engraver and illustrator.

== Biography ==
Goeldi studied zoology in Jena, Germany with Ernst Haeckel, and in 1884 he was invited by Ladislau de Souza Mello Netto, the influential director of the Brazilian Museu Imperial e Nacional, to work at that institution. Goeldi arrived in Rio de Janeiro in 1885 to work in the National Museum (now the Museu Nacional do Rio de Janeiro. In May 1890, he was fired, due to political circumstances related to the proclamation of the republic and the exile of his principal benefactor, Emperor D. Pedro II.

He was then invited by the governor of the state of Pará, Lauro Sodré, to reorganize the Pará Museum of Natural History and Ethnography, in Belém, which had been founded in 1866 by Domingos Soares Ferreira Penna. He arrived on 9 June 1894 in Belém. In his pioneering work, Goeldi was helped by several other foreign researchers, such as the Swiss botanist Jacques Huber (1867–1914), zoologist Emilie Snethlage (1868–1929), geologists Friedrich Katzer (1861–1925), and Alexander Karl von Kraatz-Koschlau (1867–1900), and Adolpho Ducke (1876–1959), entomologist, ethnographer and botanist.

In 1902, the Museu Paraense de História Natural e Ethnography was renamed in his honour. It is now called the Museu Paraense Emílio Goeldi. In 1905 Émil Goeldi renounced his post, due to ill health, and returned to Switzerland where he died in Bern, in 1917, at age 58. Huber, then Snethlage and Ducke succeeded him as general directors of the Goeldi Museum in Belém.

== Contributions ==
Goeldi was primarily a zoologist and described many new Brazilian species of birds and mammals. Some of the species which bear his name are:

- Goeldi's antbird – Myrmeciza goeldii
- Goeldi's marmoset – Callimico goeldii
- Goeldi's frog – Flectonotus goeldii

Several other species were named in honour of Émil Goeldi, such as:

- Acropyga goeldii, Camponotus goeldii, Azteca goeldii, Pachycondyla goeldii, Crematogaster torosa goeldii, Mycocepurus goeldii, Procryptocerus goeldii, Acanthoponera goeldii, Brachymyrmex goeldii, Dorymyrmex goeldii dubius, Paratrechina goeldii, Megalomyrmex goeldii, Myrmelachista goeldii, Neivamyrmex goeldii, Solenopsis goeldii, Pheidole goeldii and Cephalotes goeldii, all species of South American ants described by Auguste Forel;
- Protambulyx goeldii, a moth;
- Dubioniscus goeldii, a garden pillbug (isopod);
- Metazygia goeldii, a Brazilian species of orb-weaver spider;
- Megaelosia goeldii and Fritziana goeldii, frogs;
- Trichomycterus goeldii, a pencil catfish;
- Cynopotamus goeldii, a Characidae fish;
- Goeldi's pimelodid, Duopalatinus goeldii, a Pimelodidae freshwater fish;
- Goeldi's hemiodus, Hemiodus goeldii, a Hemiodontidae freshwater fish.
- Cheirocerus goeldii, also a catfish;
- Simulium goeldii, a blackfly from the Amazon rainforest;
- Philodendron goeldii, a philodendron plant.
- Polistes goeldii, a species of Polistes wasp.

=== In other scientific fields ===
Goeldi was also recognized as an important early figure in public health and epidemiology in Brazil, because he studied the mechanism of transmission of yellow fever and advocated the importance of fighting the mosquito as the vector of the disease, several years before Oswaldo Cruz did so. His extensive scientific research on the geography, geology, flora, fauna, archaeology, ethnography and socio-economical conditions of the present day region of Amapá was very important to end the Contestado territorial litigation between France and Brazil, ceding the territory to Brazil on 1 December 1900, by the international decision of the court of Bern.

== Publications ==
- Goeldi, E. A. (1886). Bericht über zwei ältere, unbekannt gebliebene illustrierte Manuskripte portugiesisch-brasilianischer Naturforscher. I. Die zoologischen Zeichnungen von Alexander Rodriguez Ferreira. II. Die zoologischen Zeichnungen von Arruda da Camara. Zoologische Jahrbücher, Jena, 2, 175–184
- Goeldi, E. A. (1892). Zur Orientierung in der Spinnenfauna Brasiliens. Mitteilungen aus dem Osterlande (Neue Folge), 5, 200–248
- Goeldi, E. A. (1897). A lenda amazônica do "cauré". Bol. Mus. Paraense, 2, 430–441
- Goeldi, E. A. (1897). On the nesting of Cassicus persicus, Cassidrix oryzivora, Gymnomystax melanicterus and Todirostrum maculatum. Ibis, 7(3), 361–370
- Goeldi, E. A. (1898 (1897)). A lenda amazônica do "cauré". Bol. Mus. Paraense, 2, 430–441
- Goeldi, E. A. (1900). Sobre a nidificação do Cassicus persicus (japim), do Cassidix oryzivora (graúna), do Gymnomystax melanicterus (aritauá) e do Todirostrum maculatum (ferreirinho). Bol. Mus. Para. Hist. Nat. Ethnogr., (Mus. Para.), 3, 203–210
- Goeldi, E. A. (1904). Against the destruction of white herons and red ibises on the lower Amazon, especially on the Island of Marajó(2 ed.). Belém: Pará
- Geoldi, E. A. (1905). Myrmecologische Mitteilung das Wachsen des Pilzgartens von Atta cephalotes betreffend. Paper presented at the C.r. 6th Congr. Int. Zool., Berne
- Goeldi, E. A. (1905). Beobachtungen über die erste Anlage einer neuen Kolonie von Atta cephalotes. Paper presented at the C.r. 6th Congr. Int. Zool., Berne
- Goeldi, E. A. (1905). Os mosquitos do Pará. Reunião de quatro trabalhos sobre os mosquitos indígenas, principalmente as espécies que molestam o homem. Mem. Museu E. Goeldi, 4, 1–152
- Goeldi, E. A. (1908 (1909)). Microtrogon novo nome genérico proposto para Trogon ramonianus Des Murs. Bol. Mus. Para. Hist. Nat. Ethnogr., (Mus. Pará), 5(1), 92–95
- Goeldi, E. A. (1911). Der Ameisenstaat, seine Entstehung und seine Einrichtung, die Organisation der Arbeit und die Naturwunder seines Haushaltes. Leipzig & Berlin: Teubner
