= Arua (disambiguation) =

Arua is a town in Uganda.

Arua may also refer to:

- Arua District, a district in Uganda
- Fred Arua, Papua New Guinean cricketer
- Kaia Arua, Papua New Guinean cricketer
- Arua Arunsi, Nigerian politician
- Arua Uda, Papua New Guinean cricketer

Aruá may refer to:

- Aruá language (disambiguation)

Aruã may refer to:

- Aruã people, an Indigenous people in the Brazilian state Pará
- Aruã language, an extinct Indigenous language in Brazil
- Aruã River, a river in the Brazilian state Pará

ARUA may refer to:

- African Research Universities Alliance, an alliance of 16 research universities in Africa

== See also ==
- Aruaa
- Arwa (disambiguation)
