= Ladislau de Souza Mello Netto =

Brazilian botanist

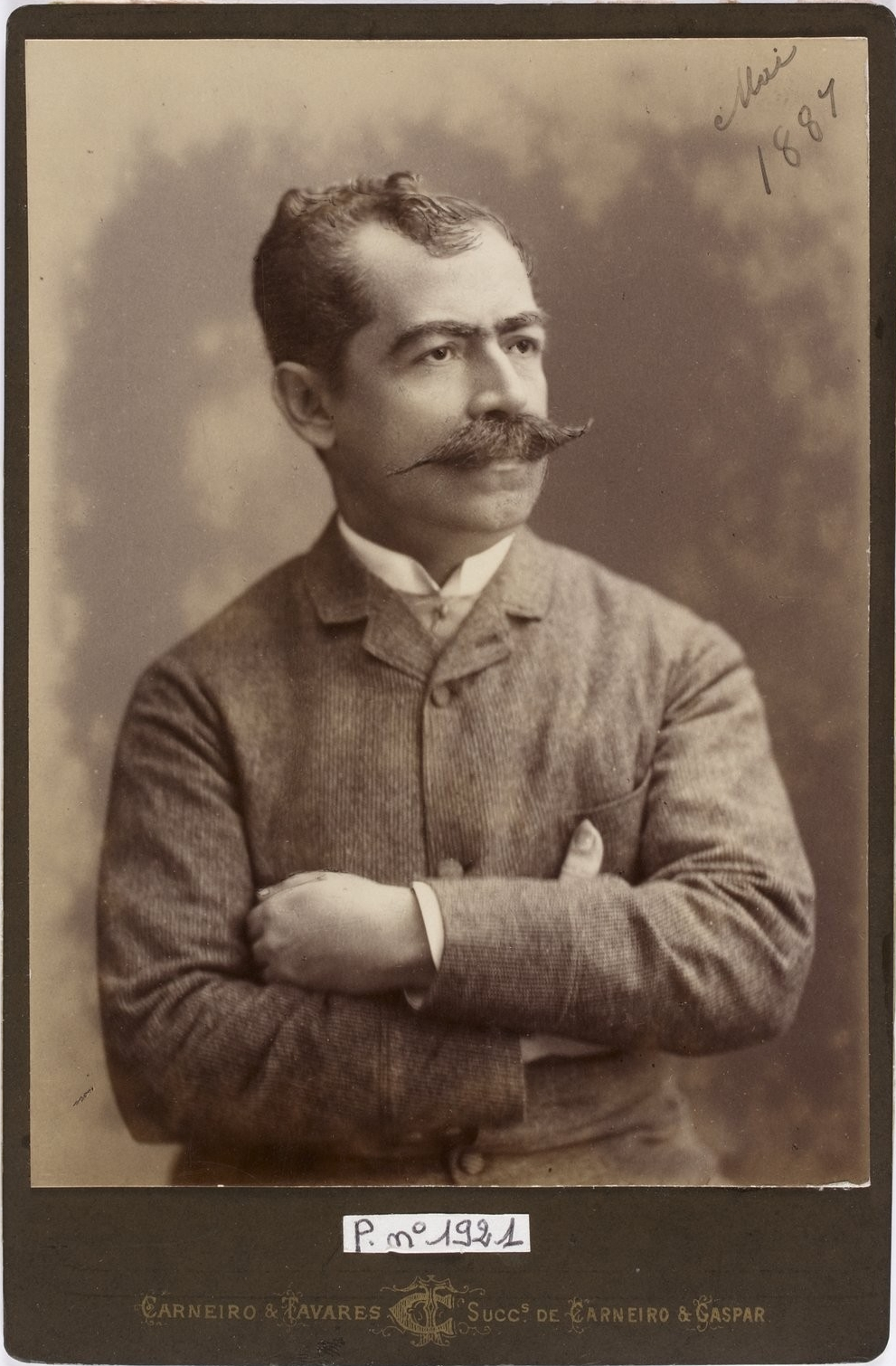
- By Carneiro & Tavares, 1887
- Born: June 27, 1838; Maceió, Alagoas, Brazil
- Died: March 18, 1894 (aged 55); Rio de Janeiro, Brazil
- Occupation: botanist

Ladislau de Souza Mello Netto (1838–1894) was a Brazilian botanist and director of the Brazilian National Museum in Rio de Janeiro.

Ladislau Netto was appointed museum director in 1870, as a substitute, and 1876, as full director, by the Brazilian Emperor Dom Pedro II, who strove to make the museum a showcase of science and learning. Thus, Ladislau Netto became the most influential Brazilian scientist of his time, with a mandate for modernizing and expanding the museum and making contacts with foreign scientists.

He was a France-trained botanist, and in this capacity his contributions were substantial.

He was also drawn to anthropology, especially physical anthropology and the question of the origin of Brazilian Indians. Here his record is less commendable: his use of science to back racism and elitism was not unusual for the period, but his exclusive focus on the interests of the National Museum led him to questionable practices, such as not returning a collection borrowed from the Museu Paraense for an exhibition.

In 1874 Ladislau Netto was taken in by a supposed Phoenician inscription from Brazil's state of Paraíba. Netto initially accepted the inscription as genuine, but when his mentor Ernest Renan declared it to be a hoax, he backed down and blamed foreigners for its fabrication.

In 1876, he founded the museum's scientific journal, the Archivos do Museu Nacional, which is still published. He hired several foreign scientists as traveling naturalists, including Fritz Müller, Emílio Goeldi, Domingos Soares Ferreira Penna, Hermann von Ihering, Wilhelm Schwacke, Orville Adalbert Derby, and others.

In 1882, the National Museum, directed by him, promoted the Brazilian Anthropological Exhibition, which had international influence.

With the advent of the Republic in 1889 and the exile of Pedro II, Ladislau Netto lost his chief patron and some of his influence. He retired in 1893.
