= Fritziana mitus =

Conservation status
- Least Concern (IUCN 3.1)

Scientific classification
- Kingdom: Animalia
- Phylum: Chordata
- Class: Amphibia
- Order: Anura
- Family: Hemiphractidae
- Genus: Fritziana
- Species: F. mitus

Binomial name
- Fritziana mitus Walker, Wachlevski, Nogueira da Costa, Nogueira-Costa, Garcia, and Haddad, 2018

Species of frog

Fritziana mitus is a species of frog in the family Hemiphractidae. It lives in Brazil.

== Description ==
The adult male frog measures 16.16–23.67 mm in snout-vent length and the adult female frog 17.43–28.35 mm. Individuals can vary in coloration. One holotype female was yellow-brown dorsally with a brown intraorbital fleck, two brown and cream-white stripes from each eye to the midbody. There was a dark brown bar around each front leg. Other adult frogs had uniform coloration on the back. Most individuals showed a dark intraorbital triangle. The iris of the eye is bronze in color with a red horizontal stripe through the middle of the eye.

== Etymology ==
Scientists named this mitus, which is Latin for "thread." This refers to this species' unique DNA strand.

== Taxonomy ==
Scientists used to believe this was the same frog as Fritziana fissilis, but DNA analysis showed them to be two separate species.

== Habitat ==
This frog has only been seen in forests. It has been found perched on plants 1 m (3 ft 3 in) to 3 m (9.8 ft) above the ground, on the forest floor, and in the canopy. Scientists saw the frog between 0 m (0 ft) and 800 m (2,600 ft) above sea level.

Scientists have reported this frog in some protected places.

== Reproduction ==
The female frog carries her eggs in a pouch on her back. She has 7-10 eggs at a time. She brings the tadpoles to bromeliad plants with rainwater. Because each tadpole has a substantial yolk sac, and because they have not been seen with other food substances, scientists infer that the tadpoles are non-feeding.

== Threats ==
The IUCN classifies this frog as least concern of extinction. What threat it faces comes from habitat loss. Long ago, the forests of the Serra do Mar were subject to considerable deforestation, but this has largely subsided. In some areas, the frogs are in a small amount of danger from habitat conversion in favor of agriculture, silviculture, animal grazing, and urbanization.

== Original description ==
- Walker, M.; Wachlevski, M.; Nogueira-Costa, P.; Garcia, P.C.A.; Haddad, C.F.B. (2018). "A new species of Fritziana Mello-Leitao 1937 (Amphibia: Anura: Hemiphractidae) from the Atlantic Forest, Brazil". Herpetologica. 74: 329–341.
