= Fritziana tonimi =

Conservation status
- Least Concern (IUCN 3.1)

Scientific classification
- Kingdom: Animalia
- Phylum: Chordata
- Class: Amphibia
- Order: Anura
- Family: Hemiphractidae
- Genus: Fritziana
- Species: F. tonimi

Binomial name
- Fritziana tonimi Walker, Gasparini, and Haddad, 2016

Species of amphibian

Fritziana tonimi is a species of frog in the family Hemiphractidae. It is endemic to the Atlantic Forest in the State of Espírito Santo, southeastern Brazil.

== Etymology ==
The specific name tonimi is in honor of herpetofauna conservationist Antônio de Pádua Almeida (Tonim).

== Description ==
The adult male frog measures 21.40–26.62 mm in snout-vent length and the adult female frog 27.04–31.20 mm. This species differs from its relatives in its mucronate snout tip, striped limbs, and open dorsal pouch in females carrying eggs. The species has its unique markings such as a triangle covering the entire dorsum and an inter-orbital triangle with a short “V” shape.

== Habitat ==
This frog has been found in primary and secondary forest. It has also been reported on eucalyptus and coffee farms.

Scientists have reported this frog in some protected areas: Área de Proteção Ambiental do Pico do Goiapaba-Açu, Estacao Biologica de Santa Lucia, and Reserva Biológica Augusto Ruschi.

== Reproduction ==
The female frog carries her eggs in a pouch on her back. She brings the tadpoles to bromeliad plants with water in them.

== Threats ==
The IUCN classifies this species as least concern of dying out. In some parts of the range, the frogs may be in some danger from habitat loss associated with urbanization, agriculture, and wood collection.
