= Friedrich Katzer =

Austrian geologist and mineralogist

Friedrich Katzer (Czech: Bedřich Katzer; 5 June 1861, Rokitzan – 3 February 1925) was an Austrian geologist and mineralogist.

From 1880 to 1883 he was a student at the University of Prague and at the Technische Hochschule in Prague, where he later worked as an assistant. In 1888 he was head of a testing station for construction materials in Wrschowitz. In 1890 he obtained his PhD from the University of Giessen, later becoming an assistant in mineralogy and geology at the University of Leoben (1892).

From 1895 he was in charge of the mineralogy/geology department at the Museu Paraense in Belém (Brazil), from where he undertook various exploratory projects. In 1898 he began work as a state geologist in Sarajevo, and in 1900 was appointed director of the Bosnian geological Landesanstalt.

He created mineralogical and geological collections in Belém at the "Museu Paraense" and at the Bosnian National Museum in Sarajevo. Under his directorship, he conducted the first comprehensive geological survey in Bosnia-Herzegovina.

== Written works ==
- Beitrag zur Kenntniss des älteren Palaeozoicums im Amazonasgebiete, 1896 - Contribution to the knowledge of older "Paleozoicum" in areas of the Amazon.
- Das Amazonas-devon und seine Beziehungen zu den anderen Devongebieten, 1897 - The Amazon Devonian and its relationship to other Devonian regions.
- Grundzüge der Geologie des unteren Amazonasgebietes: (des Staates Pará in Brasilien), 1903 - Basics of geology in the lower Amazon regions (state of Pará, Brazil).
- Karst und karsthydrographie, 1909 - Karst and karst-hydrography.
- Geologie von Böhmen, 1918 - Geology of Bohemia.
- Die Fossilen Kohlen Bosniens und der Hercegovina, 1918 - The fossil coal of Bosnia and Herzegovina.
- Geologie Bosniens und der Hercegovina, 1924-25 - Geology of Bosnia and Herzegovina.
