= Oswaldo Goeldi =

Brazilian artist and renowned engraver (1895–1961)

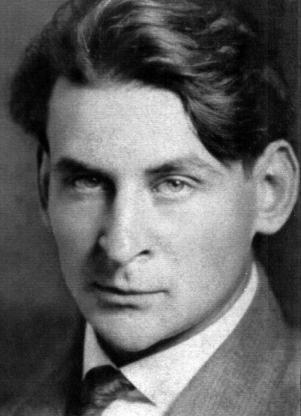
- Born: 31 October 1895; Rio de Janeiro, Brazil
- Died: 16 February 1961 (aged 65); Rio de Janeiro, Brazil
- Father: Émil Goeldi

Oswaldo Goeldi (31 October 1895 – 16 February 1961) was a Brazilian artist and engraver. He was the son of Swiss naturalist Émil Goeldi.

== Early life and education ==
Goeldi was born in Rio de Janeiro in 1895, but lived in Belém in the state Pará, until he was 6 years old. His father was based there as director of the Museu de História Natural e Etnografia do Pará (presently the Emílio Goeldi Museum). In 1910, his family returned to Switzerland and he started his studies in Bern, and later in Zürich. After serving for a brief period in the army during the First World War, Goeldi moved to Geneva, where he was accepted at the École des Arts et Métiers. Frustrated with the academic environment, he abandoned the school after his father's death in 1917 and began studying with artists Serge Pahnke (1875–1950) and Henri van Muyden (1860–s.d.), and later with Hermann Kümmerly, with whom he learned lithography.

== Career ==
In 1919, Goeldi returned to Rio de Janeiro and began a career of engraver and illustrator for popular magazines. He became attached to a group of vanguardist artists and intellectuals, such as Beatrix Reynal, Aníbal Machado (1894–1964), Otto Maria Carpeaux (1900–1978), Manuel Bandeira (1886–1968), Álvaro Moreyra (1888–1964), Ronald de Carvalho (1893–1935), Emiliano Di Cavalcanti (1897–1976) and Rachel de Queiroz (1910–2003).

During this period, he worked intensely as an artist and did his first individual exposition, which was, however, poorly received by the art critics. Wounded by the criticisms, Goeldi withdrew from the artistic scene and isolated himself in the city of Niterói. Solitary, he supported himself more and more as a well known illustrator for book editions and magazines, working mainly with xylogravures. He also became estranged from his family in 1922, refusing their appeal to return to Europe.

He took part in the Week of Modern Art in São Paulo that year. His first album, "10 Gravuras em Madeira" was edited in 1930, allowing Goeldi to save enough money to return to Europe in 1931. He exhibited in Bern and Berlin, and visited artists that he admired such as Alfred Kubin and Hermann Kümmerly Jr. In the following decades, after returning to Brazil, Goeldi's artistic prestige was strengthened, and he was accepted at the 25th Venice Biennale in 1950.

He became nationally and internationally known. He exhibited across the United States was Carlos Oswald, including at Havre, Montana, at the Boise Art Gallery in 1946, at the Columbia Museum of Art in South Carolina in 1950.

In 1951, he received his first prize in the First International Art Biennale of São Paulo. From 1955 until his death, Goeldi became a lecturer at the Escola Nacional de Belas Artes (National School of Fine Arts), where he also ran a printmaking workshop.

== Death and legacy ==
He died on 15 February 1961, alone in his small apartment in Rio.

Goeldi's work has been exhibited posthumously in more than a hundred exhibitions in Brazil, Argentina, France, Portugal, Switzerland and Spain. For example, his works were the subject of an exhibition at the Museu de Arte Moderna de São Paulo in 2012, while his works together with those of Iberê Camargo were the subject of an exhibition at Casa SP-Arte in 2024.
