= Fritziana ulei =

Conservation status
- Least Concern (IUCN 3.1)

Scientific classification
- Kingdom: Animalia
- Phylum: Chordata
- Class: Amphibia
- Order: Anura
- Family: Hemiphractidae
- Genus: Fritziana
- Species: F. ulei

Binomial name
- Fritziana ulei (Miranda-Ribeiro, 1926)

Synonyms
- Flectonotus ulei Miranda-Ribeiro, 1926

Species of frog

Fritziana ulei is a species of frog in the family Hemiphractidae. It is found in Brazil.

== Description ==
The adult male frog measures 19.2-26.9 mm in snout-vent length and the adult female frog 20.3-21 mm. It has long, robust front legs. The skin of the dorsum varies from uniform brown to brown and green. There can be bronze color on the end of the nose or on the heels of the legs. There is a pattern of bronze color between the eyes and on the eyelid, sometimes extending to the tympanum. The pattern is bordered in dark brown. Another dark brown line goes from the eye to just past where the front legs meet the body. The ventrum is beige in color. Most of the legs are beige with darker brown spots. The upper surfaces of the disks on the front toes are almost black in color. The iris of the eye can be beige, green, or red in color.

== Habitat ==
People see this frog in bromeliad plants. People have seen it on plants 150 cm (59 in) to 250 cm (98 in) above the ground. Scientists saw the frog between 0 m (0 ft) and 2,200 m (7,200 ft) above sea level.

Scientists have seen this frog in some protected areas and there are others within or partially within its range: Parque Nacional da Serra da Bocaina, Área de Proteção Ambiental de Macae de Cima, and Area Natural Tombada Serra do Mar e de Paranapiacaba.

== Reproduction ==
The female frog carries her eggs in a pouch on her back. Because each tadpole has a substantial yolk sac, scientists infer the tadpoles may be non-feeding.

== Threats ==
The IUCN classifies this species as least concern of extinction. What threat it faces comes from habitat loss associated with the loss of the Atlantic Forest.

== Original description ==
- Miranda-Ribeiro, A. de. (1926). ""Notas para servirem ao estudo dos Gymnobatrachios (Anura) Brasileiros."". Arquivos do Museu Nacional. 27. Rio de Janeiro: 1–227.
