= Vršovice (disambiguation) =

Vršovice is a district of Prague, Czech Republic.

Vršovice may also refer to places in the Czech Republic:

- Vršovice (Louny District), a municipality and village in the Ústí nad Labem Region
- Vršovice (Opava District), a municipality and village in the Moravian-Silesian Region
- Vršovice, a hamlet and part of Jesenice (Příbram District) in the Central Bohemian Region
