= Fritziana izecksohni =

Conservation status
- Data Deficient (IUCN 3.1)

Scientific classification
- Kingdom: Animalia
- Phylum: Chordata
- Class: Amphibia
- Order: Anura
- Family: Hemiphractidae
- Genus: Fritziana
- Species: F. izecksohni

Binomial name
- Fritziana izecksohni Folly, Hepp, and Carvalho-e-Silva, 2018

Species of amphibian

Fritziana izecksohni is a species of frog in the family Hemiphractidae. It is endemic to Brazil.

== Description ==
This frog is distinguished from similar species by nostrils aligned close together on its snout. Its eardrum is as large or larger than the disk on its third front toe. The belly is beige in color.

== Habitat ==
This forest-dwelling frog is found in terrestrial and arboreal bromeliad plants . Scientists have seen this frog between 1,166 m (3,825 ft) and 2,146 m (7,041 ft) above sea level.

Scientists have seen this frog in some protected places: Parque Nacional da Serra dos Órgãos, which is inside Área de Proteção Ambiental da Região Serrana de Petropolis.

== Reproduction ==
The female frog carries her eggs in a pouch on her back. This frog breeds through direct development; the young emerge as froglets.

== Threats ==
The IUCN classifies this species as data deficient. Scientists recorded this species in one of Brazil's best-protected parks. This part of the population is insulated from human encroachment. Any frogs that live outside the park, may be in some danger from habitat loss associated with urbanization, agriculture, cattle ranching, and from logging. Because the frog lives high above sea level, climate change might pose some threat. High-elevation animals cannot easily migrate to cooler areas because they would have to descend to warmer ones first.
