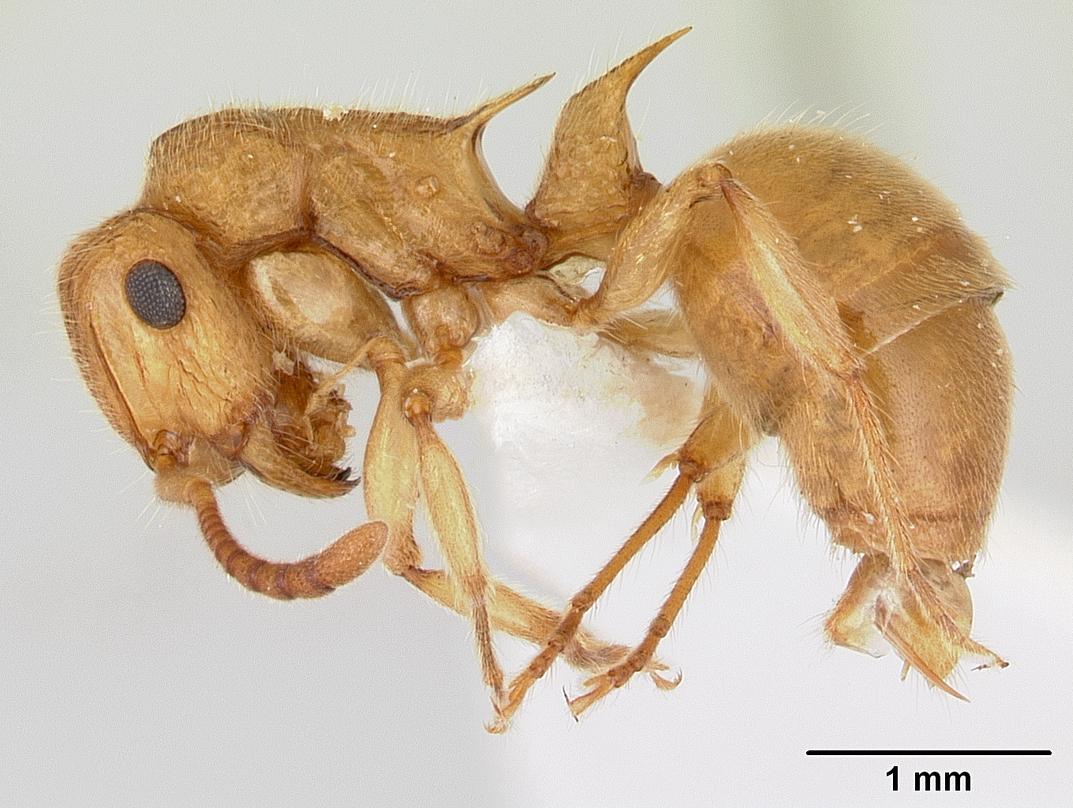

Scientific classification
- Kingdom: Animalia
- Phylum: Arthropoda
- Class: Insecta
- Order: Hymenoptera
- Family: Formicidae
- Genus: Acanthoponera
- Species: A. minor

Binomial name
- Acanthoponera minor Forel, 1899

= Acanthoponera minor =

Species of ant

Acanthoponera minor is a species of ant belonging to the genus Acanthoponera. It was described in 1899 by Forel. The species is native to North America, Central America, and South America.
