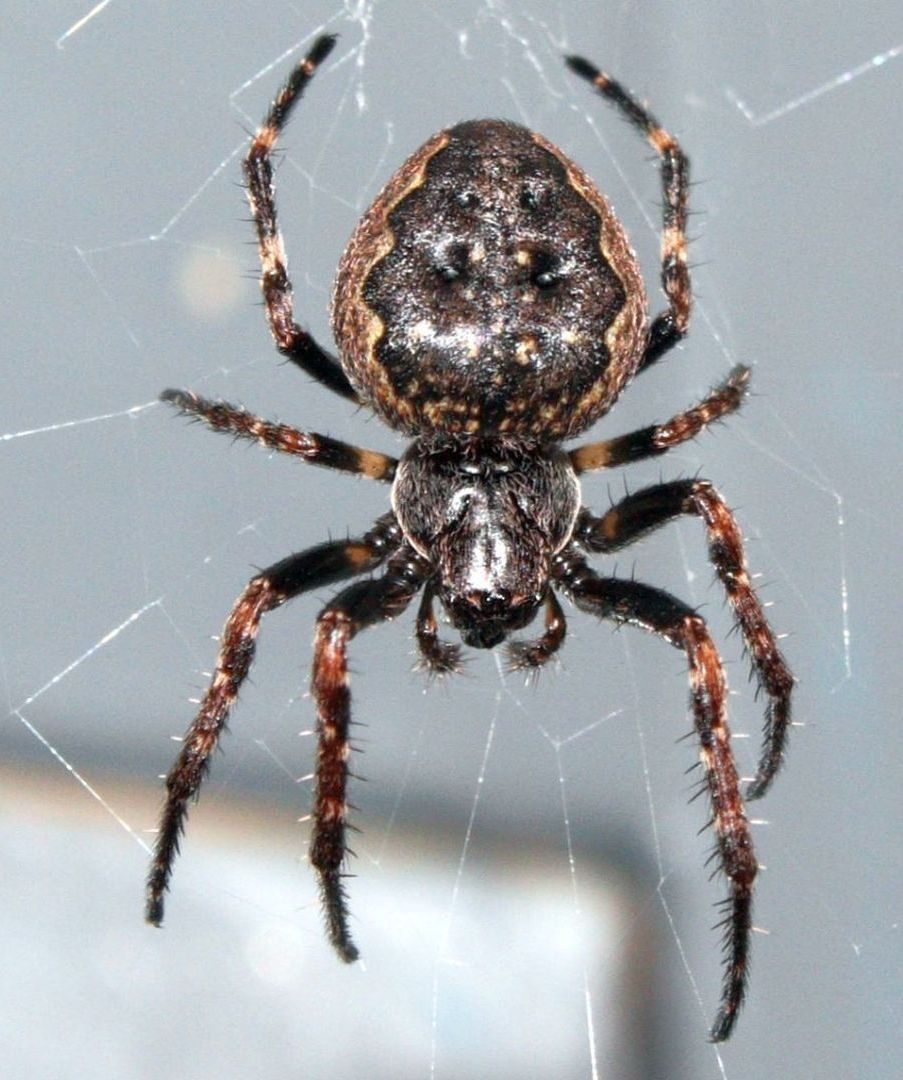

Scientific classification
- Kingdom: Animalia
- Phylum: Arthropoda
- Subphylum: Chelicerata
- Class: Arachnida
- Order: Araneae
- Infraorder: Araneomorphae
- Family: Araneidae
- Genus: Nuctenea
- Species: N. umbratica

Binomial name
- Nuctenea umbratica (Clerck, 1757)
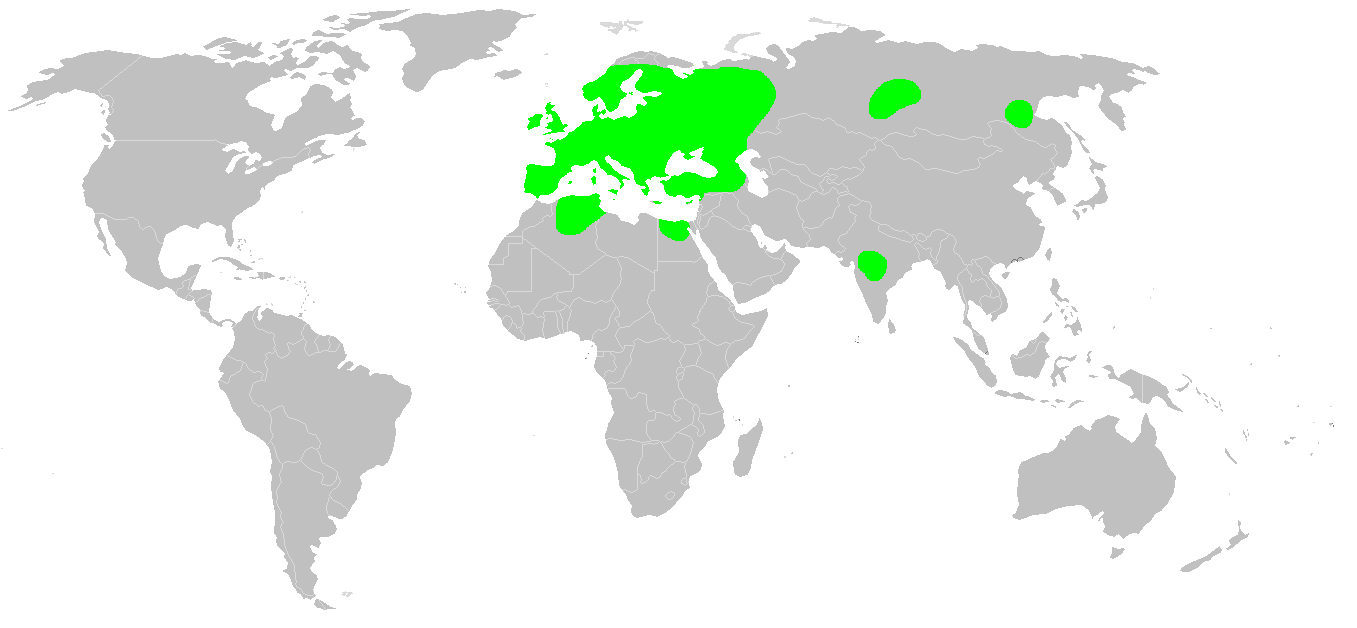

Synonyms
- Araneus umbraticus Aranea sexpunctata Aranea swammerdamii Aranea cicatricosa Epeira umbraticola Aranea impressa Aranea cicatricosa Aranea umbratica Aranea umbraticola Aranea litterata Epeira umbratica Epeira cinerea Epeira thomisoides Chinestela umbratica Cathaistela umbratica

= Nuctenea umbratica =

Species of spider

Nuctenea umbratica, the walnut orb-weaver spider, is a species of spider in the family Araneidae.

== Name ==
The species name umbratica means "living in the shadows" in Latin.

== Description ==
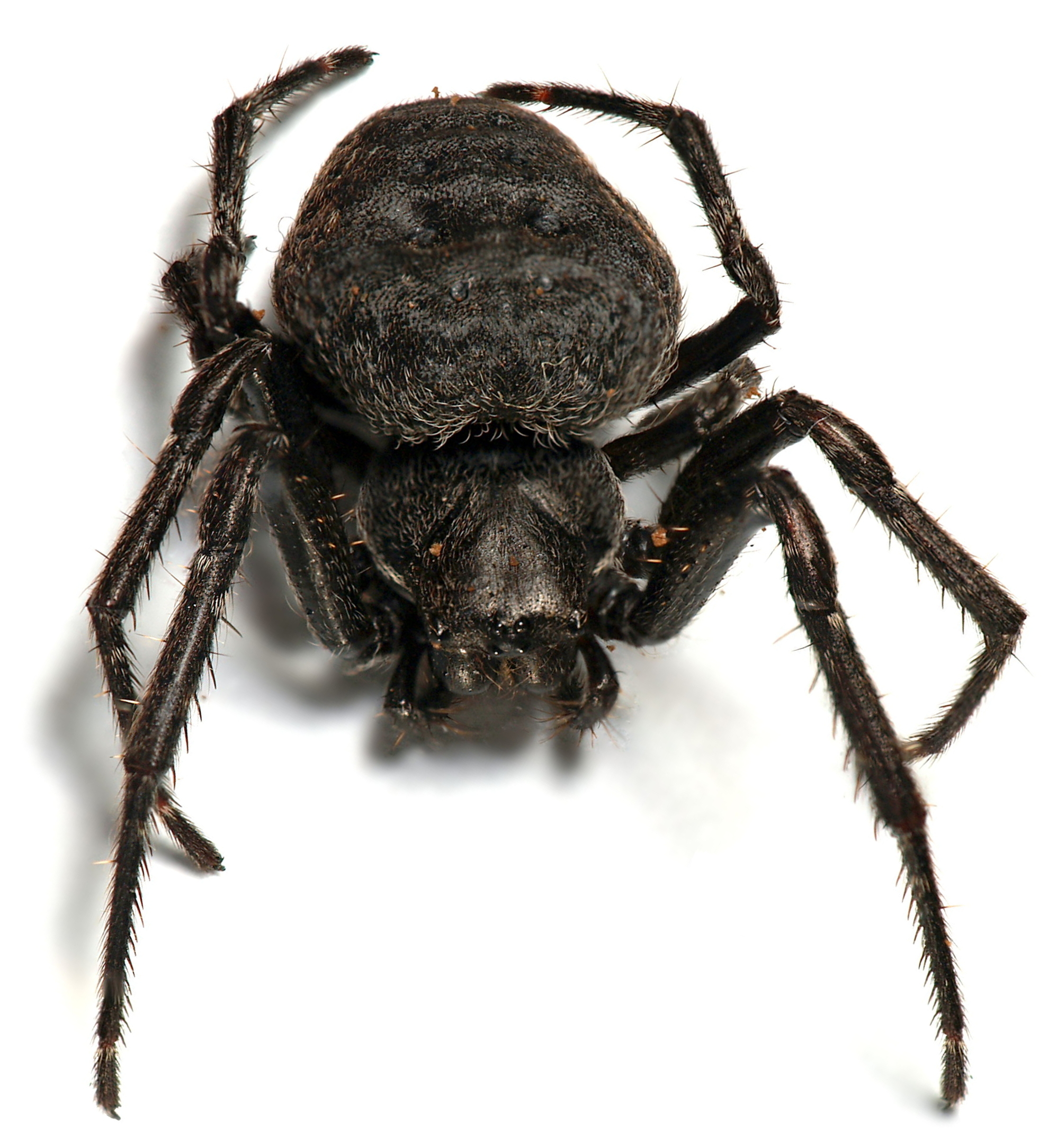

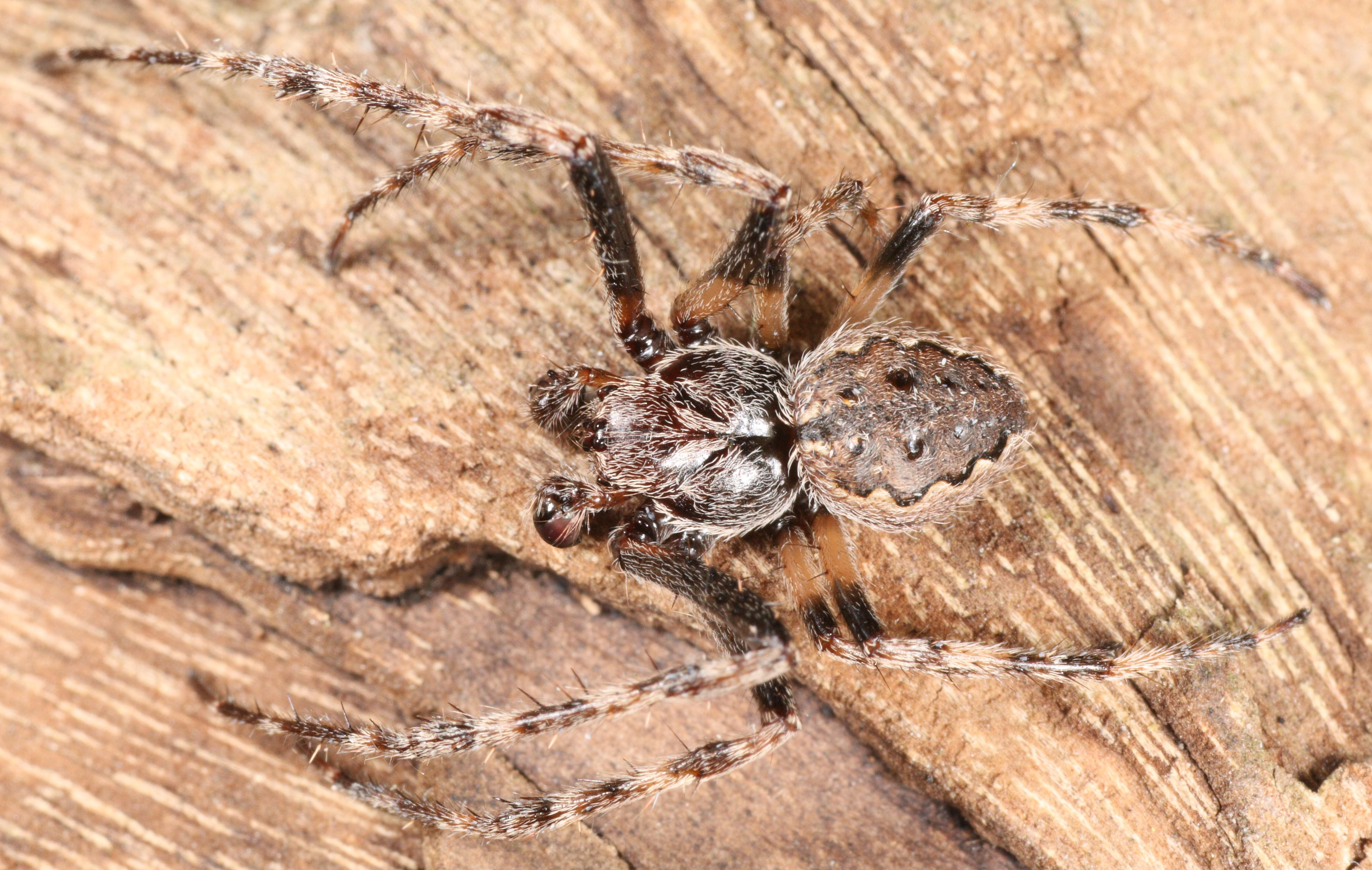
♂

The walnut orb-weaver spider has a wide, flattened body and leathery skin. Its colour ranges from reddish-brown to black, with dark yellowish-green leaf-like markings on its opisthosoma, where small dents are visible. These dents are the onsets of muscles that flatten the abdomen.

Female N. umbratica can reach up to 15 mm in size; the males grow only up to 8 mm.

This spider hides outside buildings during the day, in wall crevices or under loose bark. It is very common in Central Europe, with females present all year and males mostly appearing during the summer. This spider has a flattened body which helps it to hide in cracks and crevices. Walnut orb-weaving spiders can conceal themselves in very confined spaces. This acts as a defensive advantage, increasing the number of locations where an effective orb web can be constructed.

In the evening the spider constructs an orb-web that can be up to 70 cm in diameter. A signaling thread leads from the web to her hiding place. After dusk she sits in the web's center.

== Distribution and subspecies ==
- Nuctenea umbratica (Clerck, 1757) – Europe to Azerbaijan
- Nuctenea umbratica nigricans (Franganillo, 1909) – Portugal
- Nuctenea umbratica obscura (Franganillo, 1909) – Portugal
