= Archivos do Museu Nacional =

Scientific journal

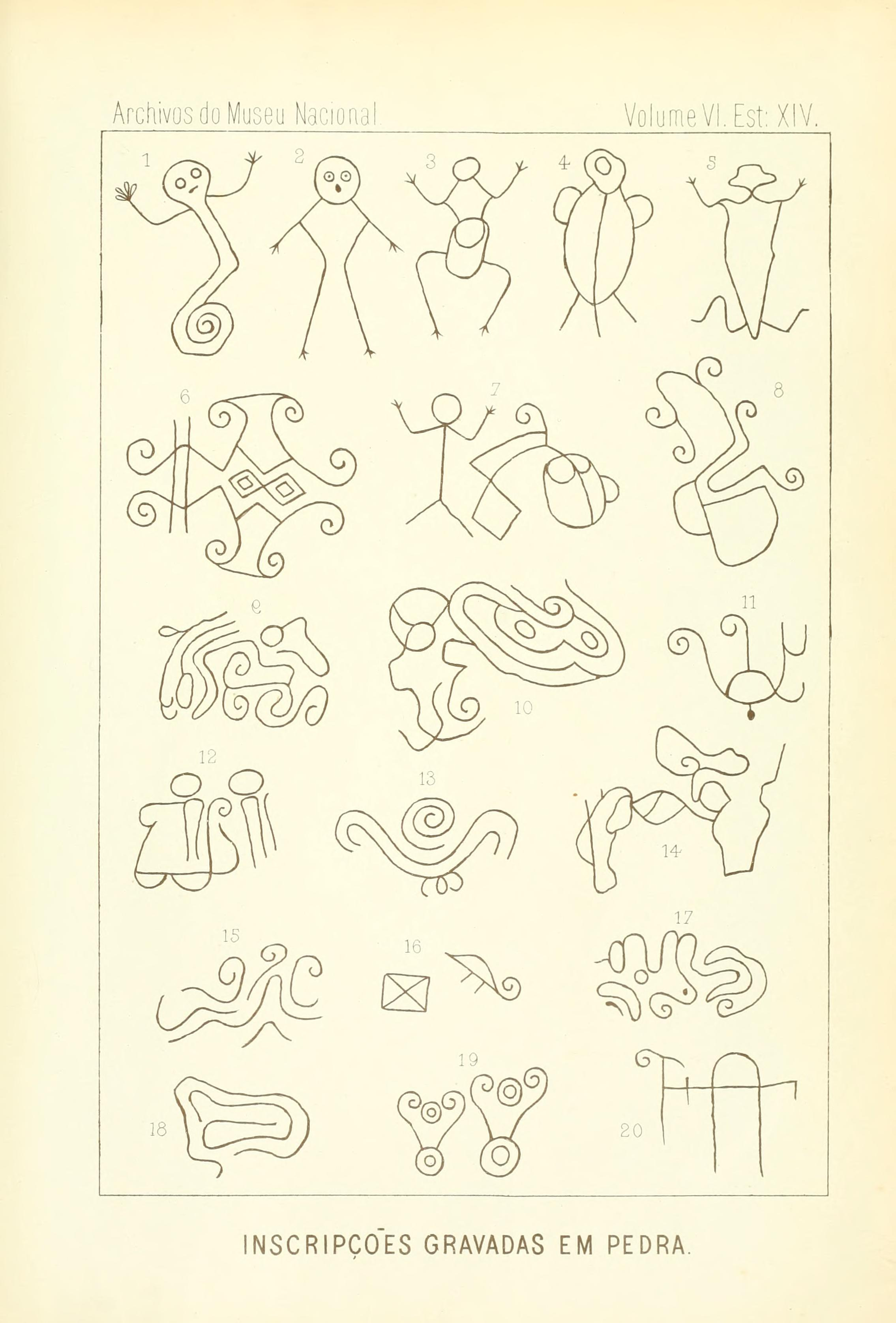
A page from the 1885 edition of the journal

Arquivos do Museu Nacional (previously Archivos do Museu Nacional; ISSN: 0365–4508) is the oldest scientific journal of Brazil. Its first issue was published in 1876, founded by Ladislau de Souza Mello Netto. The journal is edited and published quarterly (March, June, September and December) by the National Museum of Brazil and the Federal University of Rio de Janeiro. The journal areas cover anthropology, archaeology, botany, geology, paleontology and zoology.
