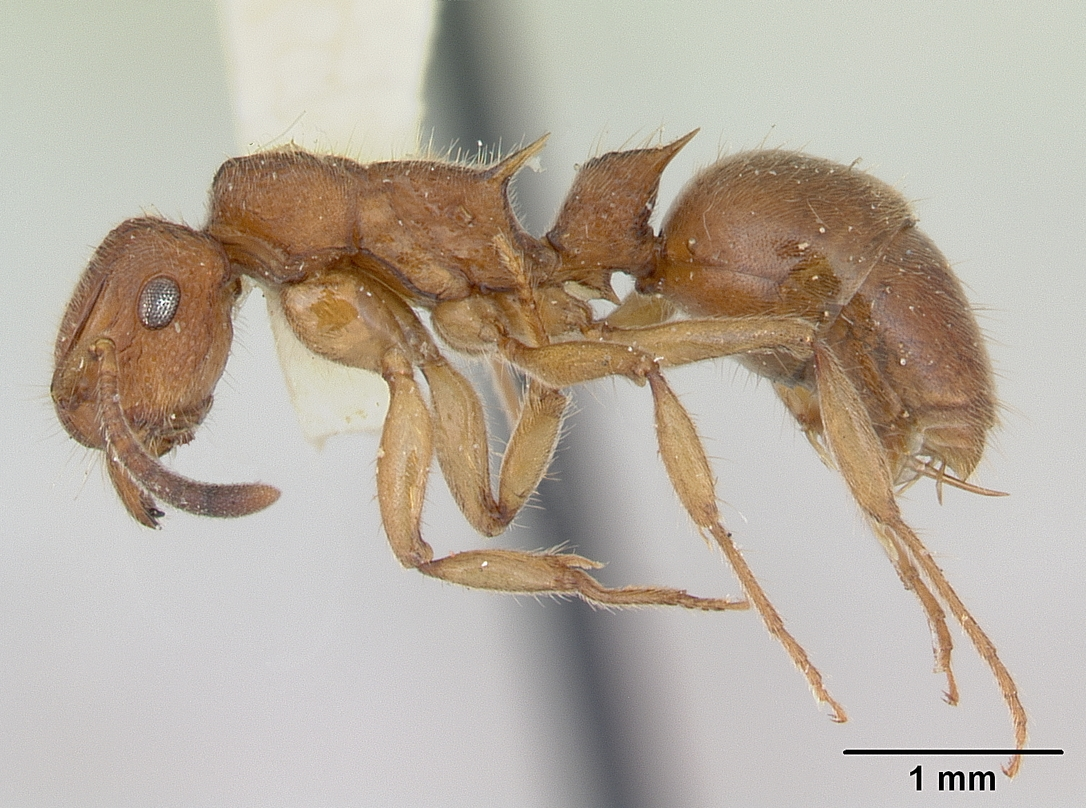
- Acantoponera minor worker from Ecuador

Scientific classification
- Domain: Eukaryota
- Kingdom: Animalia
- Phylum: Arthropoda
- Class: Insecta
- Order: Hymenoptera
- Family: Formicidae
- Subfamily: Ectatomminae
- Tribe: Heteroponerini
- Genus: Acanthoponera; Mayr, 1862

Type species
- Ponera mucronata

Diversity
- 4 species

= Acanthoponera =

Genus of ants

Acanthoponera is a Neotropical genus of ants in the subfamily Ectatomminae. Acanthoponera contains six (one is indeterminate, and one is a morphotaxon) rarely collected species and a fifth unnamed species mentioned by Brown (1958) only known from a stray gyne.

Acanthoponera is a genus of ants from the New World, distributed from Mexico to Argentina (approximately). Specimens have been observed in wooded areas.

== Identification ==
Medium size in workers (5-10mm) pale yellow color in its majority, large convex eyes and shallow antennal brooms. The propodeum bears a pair of teeth or spines (long and slender in worker), and the apex of the petiole node occurs dorsocaudally as a thin subconical spine with a more or less sharp point. The tarsal claws are very well developed and each bears not only a strong submedian tooth, but also a prominent narrow lobe resembling a third tooth.

• Count of antennal segments: 12 • Antennal club: 4-5 • Palp formula: 6.4 • Total tooth count: 6-9

== Species ==
- Acanthoponera goeldii Forel, 1912
- Acanthoponera minor (Forel, 1899)
- Acanthoponera mucronata (Roger, 1860)
- Acanthoponera peruviana Brown, 1958
