= Brazilian Anthropological Exhibition of 1882 =

The Brazilian Anthropological Exhibition of 1882 was one of the most important scientific events of the 19th-century Brazil, conducted by the National Museum of Rio de Janeiro and heavily influenced by Darwinism.

== History ==
In the second half of the 19th century - particularly since the 1870s - the popularization of evolutionary theories on the rise in Europe, led to large increase of scientific institutions in Latin America, and made the museum the preferential sites of exposure of these theories. Such theories have been adapted and took specific format in Brazil in order to legitimize some speculation about the position as they would be blacks and mestizos in the evolutionary chain suggested by Darwin.

It was in this context that, in 1882, the National Museum, directed by Ladislau Netto, as a generator of research and academic issues, promoted the Brazilian Anthropological Exhibition. To bring the collection to be shown in the exhibition, Netto sent requests to all provinces molds Botocudo arrived from Goias and Espírito Santo came ethnological objects of Amazonas and Mato Grosso, lithic and ceramic pieces were sent by the Museum of Paraná, and private collections. The books were borrowed from the National Library.

According to the Show Guide, the collections were organized in eight halls, especially redecorated for the occasion, receiving the names of naturalists and missionaries of the past, such as Pero Vaz de Caminha, Jean de Lery, Gabriel Soares de Sousa, José de Anchieta, Alexandre Rodrigues Ferreira, and contemporary scientists, such as Martius, Hartt and Lund. In each of these sections were displayed various archaeological objects to a greater or lesser number. The room Lund was the one that got fossilized human remains, while the Hartt contained most of the ceramic fragments and Lery the remains of middens.

For reporting on the event to the general public, the exhibition was attended by journalists of the leading journals of the city, including the famous (and feared) cartoonist, Angelo Agostini, and photographer Marc Ferrez. As special attraction, were brought a small group of Indians Botocudos, from Espírito Santo, and three other Indians Xerente of Minas Gerais.

Prestigious by the presence of the emperor himself, D. Pedro II and his daughter, Princess Isabel, the Exhibition was inaugurated on July 29, 1882, extending over three months. He had an audience of over a thousand visitors, a real success in the country, with international repercussions.
