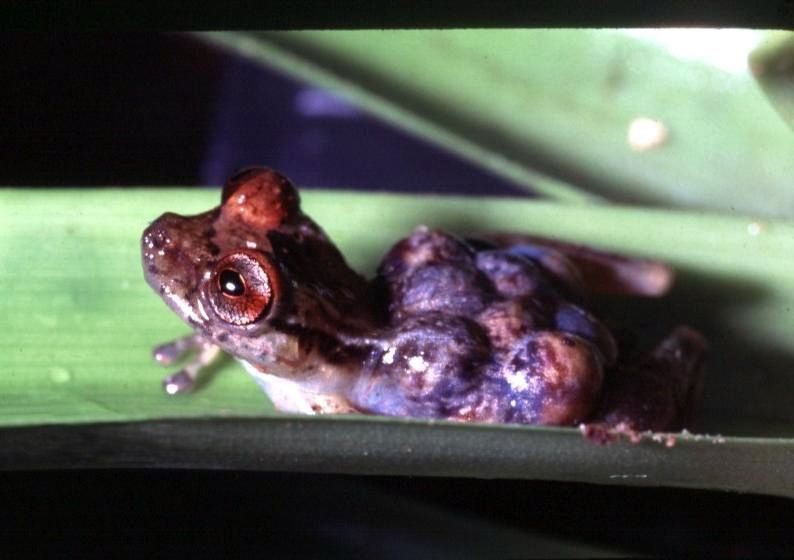

Conservation status
- Least Concern (IUCN 3.1)

Scientific classification
- Kingdom: Animalia
- Phylum: Chordata
- Class: Amphibia
- Order: Anura
- Family: Hemiphractidae
- Genus: Fritziana
- Species: F. ohausi

Binomial name
- Fritziana ohausi (Wandolleck, 1907)

Synonyms
- Hyla ohausi Wandolleck, 1907; Fritzia ohausi (Wandolleck, 1907); Flectonotus ohausi (Wandolleck, 1907)

= Fritziana ohausi =

Species of frog

Fritziana ohausi is a species of frog in the family Hemiphractidae. It is endemic to the mountains of coastal southeastern Brazil in Rio de Janeiro, Espírito Santo, and São Paulo states. The specific name ohausi honors Friedrich Ohaus, a German physicist and herpetologist. Common name Petropolis treefrog has been proposed for this species.

== Description ==
Adult males measure 24–31 mm (0.9–1.2 in) and adult females 29–37 mm (1.1–1.5 in) in snout–vent length. The tympanum is present but is partly hidden and less distinct in females than in males. The fingers have large discs and lateral ridges or fringes but no webbing. The toes have large discs and partially webbed. Dorsal pattern is spotted with variable coloration, including brown, black, and white, or greenish bronze, or yellow brown, or bronzy brown. The belly is gray with cream flecks or transparent with silvery mottling and sparse brown flecks. The throat is clear with dense brown and silvery mottling or similar to the belly. Males have a single internal vocal sac.

== Habitat and conservation ==
Fritziana ohausi occurs in primary forests at elevations of 600–1,200 m (2,000–3,900 ft) asl. These frogs occur in bamboo clusters or on leaves of low vegetation. The female carries eggs on her back and later deposits the tadpoles in bamboo stems.

Fritziana ohausi is a very common species that faces no major threats; it tolerates some habitat disturbance, and can be found anywhere where there are trees and bamboo. It is present in several protected areas.
