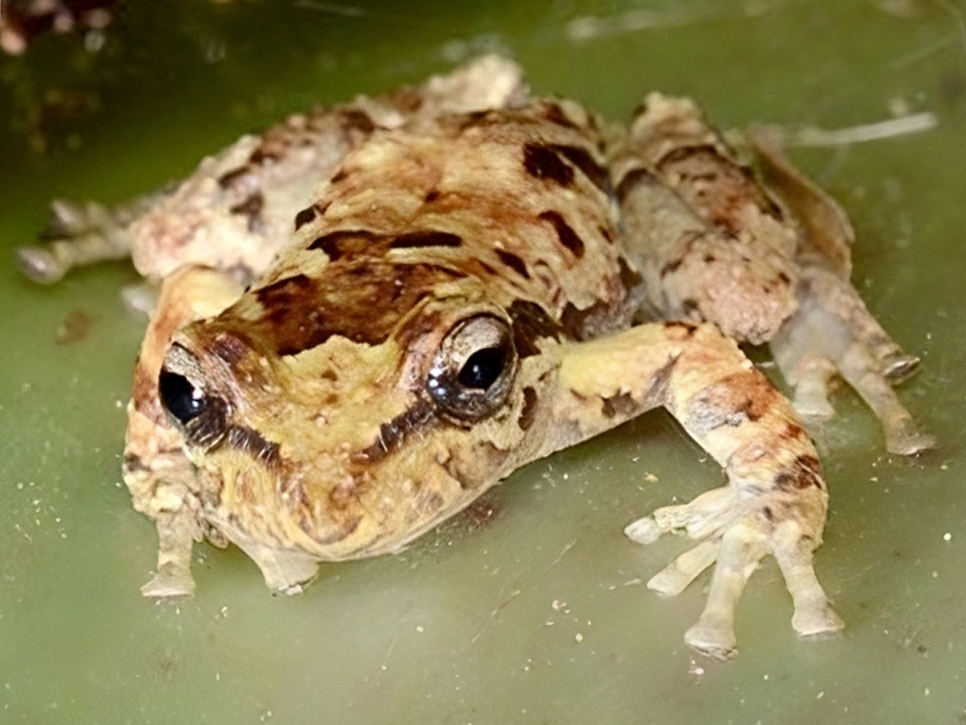

Conservation status
- Least Concern (IUCN 3.1)

Scientific classification
- Kingdom: Animalia
- Phylum: Chordata
- Class: Amphibia
- Order: Anura
- Family: Hemiphractidae
- Genus: Fritziana
- Species: F. goeldii

Binomial name
- Fritziana goeldii (Boulenger, 1895)

Synonyms
- Hyla goeldii Boulenger, 1895 "1894"; Flectonotus goeldii (Boulenger, 1895)

= Fritziana goeldii =

Species of amphibian

Fritziana goeldii, also known as Goeldi's frog or Colonia Alpina treefrog, is a species of frog in the family Hemiphractidae. It is endemic to southeastern Brazil and found in Rio de Janeiro, Espírito Santo, and São Paulo states. The species is named after Émil Goeldi, Swiss zoologist who worked in Brazil. Fritziana goeldii may be locally threatened by habitat destruction but over most of its range it is a common species with a large total population, and the International Union for Conservation of Nature has rated its conservation status as being of "least concern".

== Description ==
Fritziana goeldii is a small, slender frog; females are 32 to 35 mm (1.26 to 1.38 in) long and males are slightly smaller. The snout is pointed, the eyes are large, and there are adhesive discs on the tips of the fingers and toes. The upper parts of the head and body are some shade of pale grey or brown, blotched and streaked with darker colour.

== Distribution and habitat ==
Fritziana goeldii is endemic to southeastern Brazil, where it is found in the states of Rio de Janeiro, São Paulo and Espírito Santo. Its natural habitat is forest at altitudes between sea level and about 1,000 m (3,300 ft) above sea level, but it is an adaptable species, able to live anywhere that there are trees and the epiphytic bromeliads in which it breeds.

The frog has been reported in several protected areas, specifically Área de Proteção Ambiental Campos do Jordao, Área de Proteção Ambiental da Regiao Serrana de Petropolis, PARES Cunhambebe, and PARNA da Tijuca.

== Ecology ==
This frog lives among vegetation a few metres above the ground, mostly in and around bromeliads. Breeding is a lengthy affair; while the couple are in amplexus, the female secretes quantities of mucus which the male whips into foam with his legs and spreads on the female's back. Here it forms a sticky pad onto which the male presses the fertilised eggs. A clutch of eggs may number nine to twenty or so, and the pad soon hardens. After about nineteen days, the female detaches the eggs and places them in the water-filled hollow of a bromeliad. Here they soon hatch, and undergo metamorphosis a few days later into juvenile frogs.
