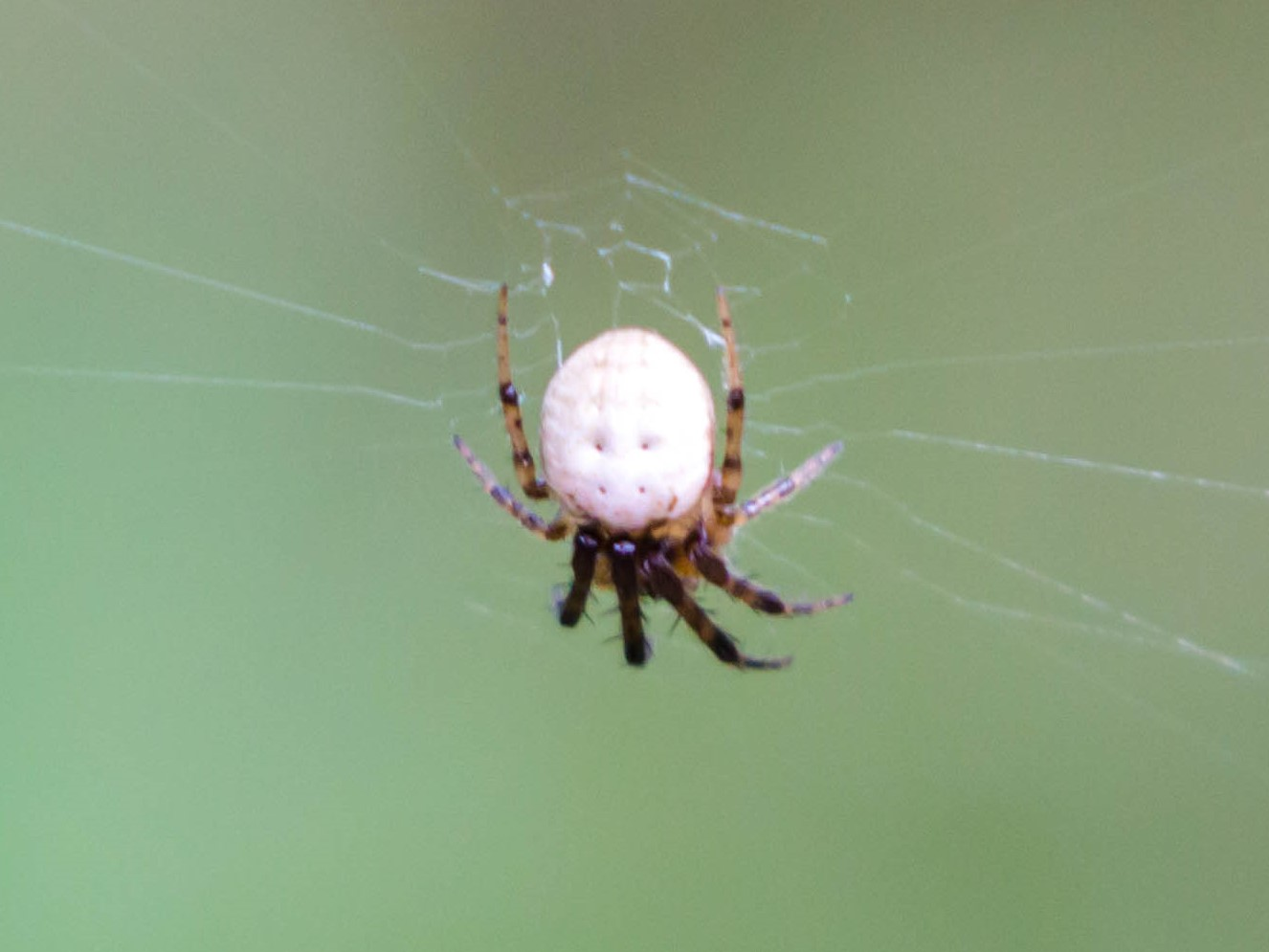
- Metazygia zilloides

Scientific classification
- Kingdom: Animalia
- Phylum: Arthropoda
- Subphylum: Chelicerata
- Class: Arachnida
- Order: Araneae
- Infraorder: Araneomorphae
- Family: Araneidae
- Genus: Metazygia; F. O. Pickard-Cambridge, 1904

Type species
- M. wittfeldae (McCook, 1894)

Species
- 90, see text

= Metazygia =

Genus of spiders

Metazygia is a genus of orb-weaver spiders first described by F. O. Pickard-Cambridge in 1904. They physically resemble members of Nuctenea, but they do not have fine setae on the carapace.

== Species ==
As of November 2026 it contains ninety species:

- M. adisi Levi, 1995 – Brazil
- M. aldela Levi, 1995 – Brazil
- M. amalla Levi, 1995 – Brazil
- M. arnoi Levi, 1995 – Brazil
- M. atalaya Levi, 1995 – Peru
- M. atama Levi, 1995 – Brazil
- M. bahama Levi, 1995 – Bahama Is.
- M. bahia Levi, 1995 – Brazil
- M. barueri Levi, 1995 – Brazil
- M. benella Levi, 1995 – Panama, Colombia
- M. bolivia Levi, 1995 – Bolivia
- M. calix (Walckenaer, 1841) – USA
- M. carimagua Levi, 1995 – Colombia
- M. carolinalis (Archer, 1951) – USA
- M. carrizal Levi, 1995 – Guatemala
- M. castaneoscutata (Simon, 1895) – Peru, Brazil
- M. cazeaca Levi, 1995 – Brazil
- M. chenevo Levi, 1995 – Colombia, Guyana
- M. chicanna Levi, 1995 – Mexico, Belize, Honduras, Jamaica
- M. cienaga Levi, 1995 – Hispaniola
- M. corima Levi, 1995 – Colombia
- M. corumba Levi, 1995 – Bolivia, Brazil
- M. crabroniphila Strand, 1916 – Brazil
- M. crewi (Banks, 1903) – Greater Antilles, Virgin Is.
- M. cunha Levi, 1995 – Brazil
- M. curari Levi, 1995 – Brazil
- M. dubia (Keyserling, 1864) – Costa Rica, Cuba to Galapagos Is., Peru, Brazil
- M. ducke Levi, 1995 – Brazil, Bolivia
- M. enabla Levi, 1995 – Colombia, Venezuela
- M. erratica (Keyserling, 1883) – Brazil
- M. floresta Levi, 1995 – Brazil
- M. genaro Levi, 1995 – Peru
- M. genialis (Keyserling, 1892) – Brazil, Dominican Republic (Hispaniola)
- M. goeldii Levi, 1995 – French Guiana, Brazil
- M. gregalis (O. Pickard-Cambridge, 1889) – Nicaragua, Caribbean to Argentina
- M. ikuruwa Levi, 1995 – Guyana
- M. incerta (O. Pickard-Cambridge, 1889) – Belize to Panama
- M. ipago Levi, 1995 – Brazil
- M. ipanga Levi, 1995 – Bolivia, Brazil, Argentina
- M. isabelae Levi, 1995 – Brazil
- M. ituari Levi, 1995 – Brazil
- M. jamari Levi, 1995 – Brazil, Suriname
- M. keyserlingi Banks, 1929 – Costa Rica, Panama, Colombia, Trinidad
- M. lagiana Levi, 1995 – Peru, Brazil, Bolivia, Argentina
- M. laticeps (O. Pickard-Cambridge, 1889) – Guatemala to Bolivia, Brazil
- M. lazepa Levi, 1995 – Colombia, Venezuela
- M. levii Santos, 2003 – Brazil
- M. limonal Levi, 1995 – Peru, Brazil, Argentina
- M. lopez Levi, 1995 – Colombia, Venezuela, Peru, Brazil
- M. loque Levi, 1995 – Bolivia
- M. manu Levi, 1995 – Peru, French Guiana
- M. mariahelenae Levi, 1995 – Brazil
- M. matanzas Levi, 1995 – Cuba
- M. moldira Levi, 1995 – Ecuador, Peru
- M. mundulella (Strand, 1916) – Brazil
- M. nigrocincta (F. O. Pickard-Cambridge, 1904) – Mexico to Panama
- M. nobas Levi, 1995 – Ecuador
- M. octama Levi, 1995 – Panama to Peru
- M. oro Levi, 1995 – Ecuador
- M. pallidula (Keyserling, 1864) – Mexico to Peru
- M. paquisha Levi, 1995 – Venezuela, Peru
- M. pastaza Levi, 1995 – Peru
- M. patiama Levi, 1995 – Peru, Brazil
- M. peckorum Levi, 1995 – Colombia, Ecuador, Peru, Brazil
- M. pimentel Levi, 1995 – Venezuela, Peru
- M. redfordi Levi, 1995 – Brazil
- M. rogenhoferi (Keyserling, 1878) – Brazil
- M. rothi Levi, 1995 – Colombia
- M. samiria Levi, 1995 – Peru
- M. saturnino Levi, 1995 – Brazil
- M. sendero Levi, 1995 – Colombia, Ecuador, Peru
- M. serian Levi, 1995 – Costa Rica
- M. silvestris (Bryant, 1942) – Puerto Rico
- M. souza Levi, 1995 – Brazil
- M. taman Levi, 1995 – Mexico
- M. tanica Levi, 1995 – Guyana, French Guiana
- M. tapa Levi, 1995 – Colombia, Peru, French Guiana
- M. uma Levi, 1995 – Colombia, Peru, Brazil
- M. uraricoera Levi, 1995 – Brazil, Guyana, Suriname
- M. uratron Levi, 1995 – Brazil
- M. valentim Levi, 1995 – Brazil
- M. vaupes Levi, 1995 – Colombia, Peru, Brazil
- M. vaurieorum Levi, 1995 – Guatemala
- M. viriosa (Keyserling, 1892) – Brazil
- M. voluptifica (Keyserling, 1892) – Colombia to Argentina
- M. voxanta Levi, 1995 – Brazil
- M. wittfeldae (McCook, 1894) – USA to Costa Rica
- M. yobena Levi, 1995 – Colombia to Guyana, Bolivia
- M. yucumo Levi, 1995 – Colombia, Peru, Bolivia, French Guiana
- M. zilloides (Banks, 1898) – USA, Caribbean to Honduras
