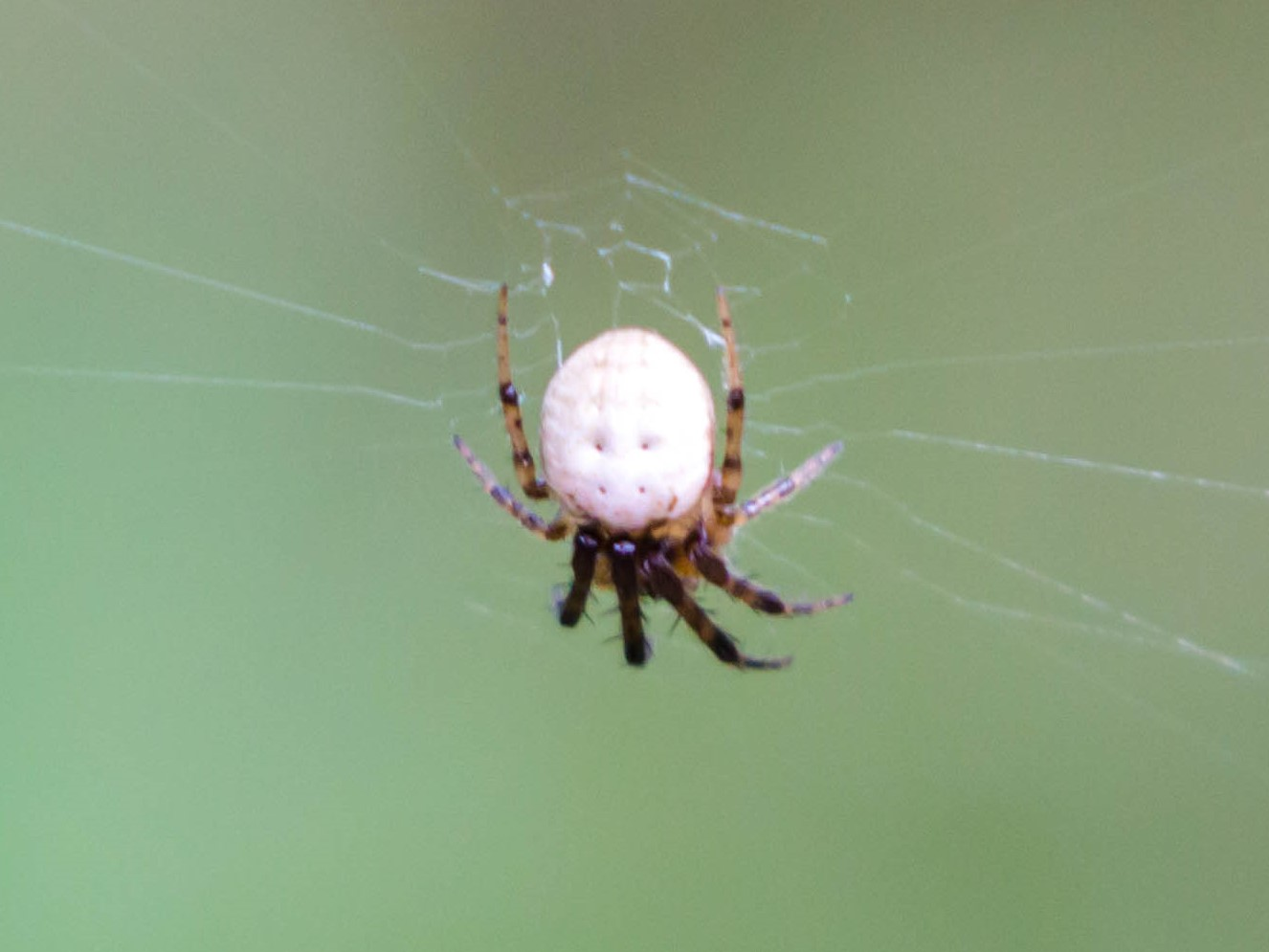

Scientific classification
- Domain: Eukaryota
- Kingdom: Animalia
- Phylum: Arthropoda
- Subphylum: Chelicerata
- Class: Arachnida
- Order: Araneae
- Infraorder: Araneomorphae
- Family: Araneidae
- Genus: Metazygia
- Species: M. zilloides

Binomial name
- Metazygia zilloides (Banks, 1898)

= Metazygia zilloides =

Species of spider

Metazygia zilloides is a species of orb weaver in the spider family Araneidae. It is found in the United States and a range from the Caribbean Sea to Honduras.
