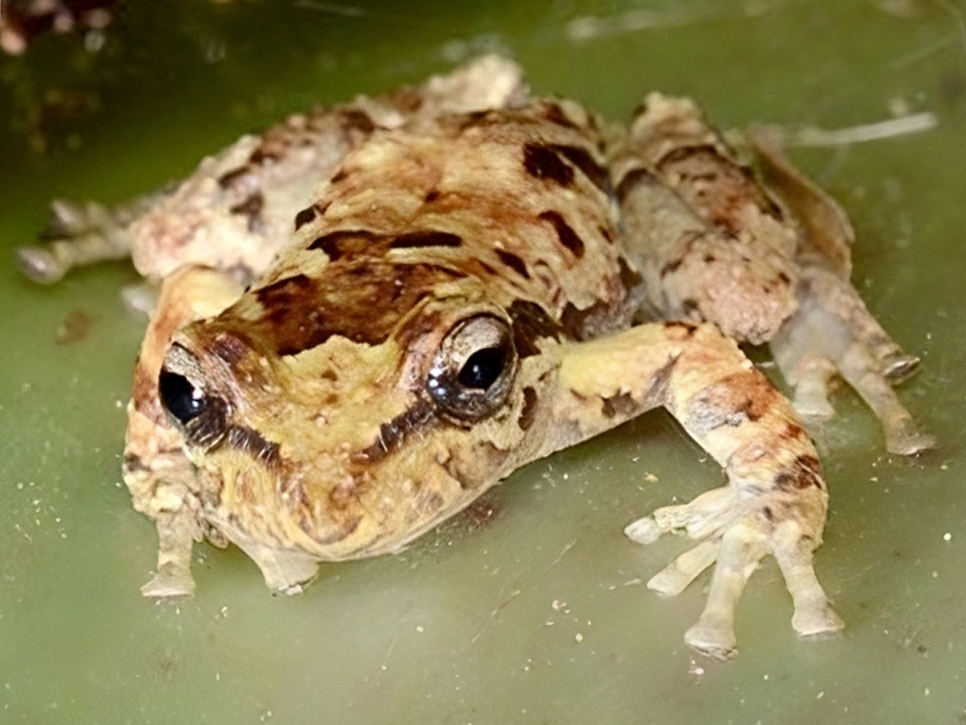
- Fritziana goeldii, the type species

Scientific classification
- Kingdom: Animalia
- Phylum: Chordata
- Class: Amphibia
- Order: Anura
- Family: Hemiphractidae
- Subfamily: Hemiphractinae
- Genus: Fritziana; Mello-Leitão, 1937

Type species
- Hyla goeldii Boulenger, 1895

Species
- See text

Synonyms
- Fritzia Miranda-Ribeiro, 1920 — junior homonym of Fritzia

= Fritziana =

Genus of amphibians

Fritziana is a genus of frogs in the family Hemiphractidae. They are endemic to southeastern Brazil and found on the mountains and adjacent coastal lowlands from Espírito Santo to São Paulo state.

== Taxonomy ==
The genus has been considered synonym of Flectonotus, but was recognized again in 2011. The former Flectonotus consisted of two geographically disjunctive components, one from northern South America (Flectonotus as understood today) and the other from southeastern Brazil (Fritziana). The distinctiveness of these taxa is now well established and based on both molecular, behavioural, and morphological characters.

== Species ==
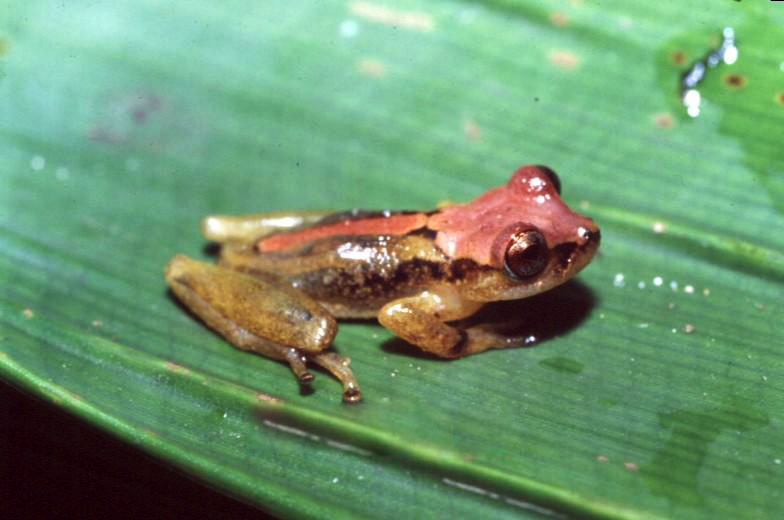
Fritziana fissilis

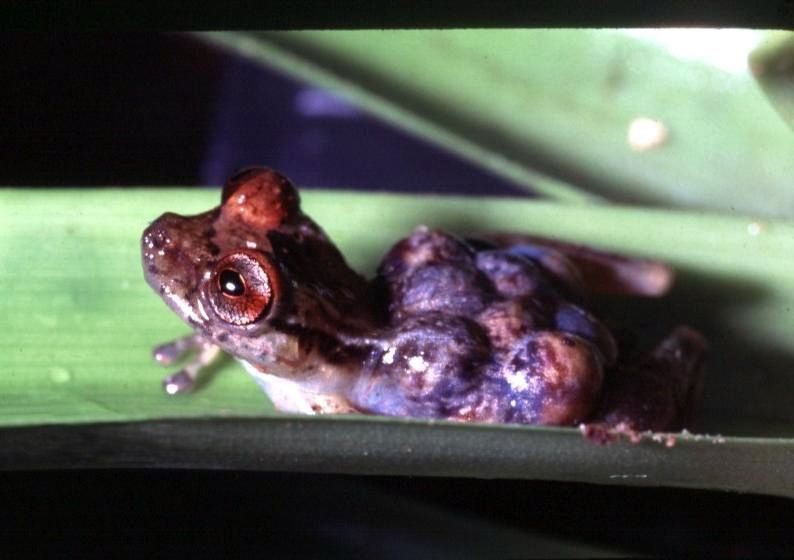
Fritziana ohausi

The following species are recognised in the genus Fritziana:

- Fritziana fissilis (Miranda-Ribeiro, 1920)
- Fritziana goeldii (Boulenger, 1895)
- Fritziana izecksohni Folly, Hepp, and Carvalho-e-Silva, 2018
- Fritziana mitus Walker, Wachlevski, Nogueira da Costa, Nogueira-Costa, Garcia, and Haddad, 2018
- Fritziana ohausi (Wandolleck, 1907)
- Fritziana tonimi Walker, Gasparini, and Haddad, 2016
- Fritziana ulei (Miranda-Ribeiro, 1926)
