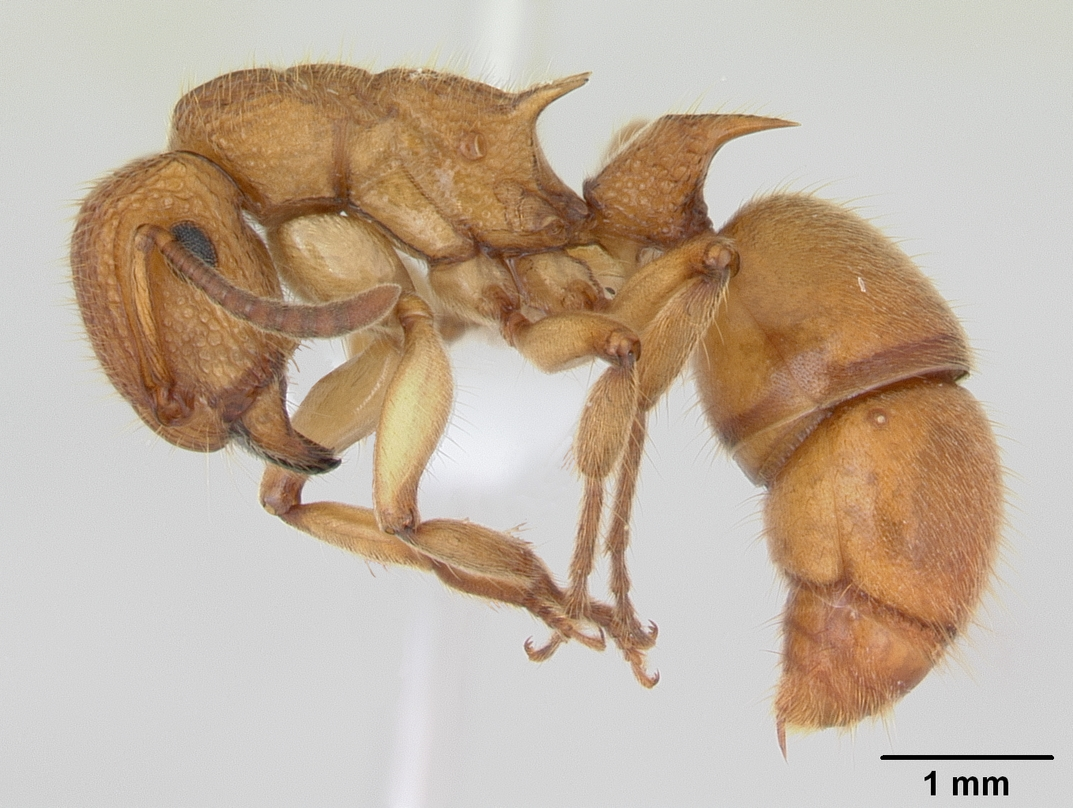

Scientific classification
- Kingdom: Animalia
- Phylum: Arthropoda
- Class: Insecta
- Order: Hymenoptera
- Family: Formicidae
- Genus: Acanthoponera
- Species: A. mucronata

Binomial name
- Acanthoponera mucronata Roger, 1860

= Acanthoponera mucronata =

Species of ant

Acanthoponera mucronata is a species of ant belonging to the genus Acanthoponera. Described in 1860 by Roger, the species is native to South America.
