= Aruá language =

"The Aruá language of South America" may refer to:

- Arawá language (Arawan family)
- Aruáshi language (Tupian family)
- Aruã language (Arawakan family)
