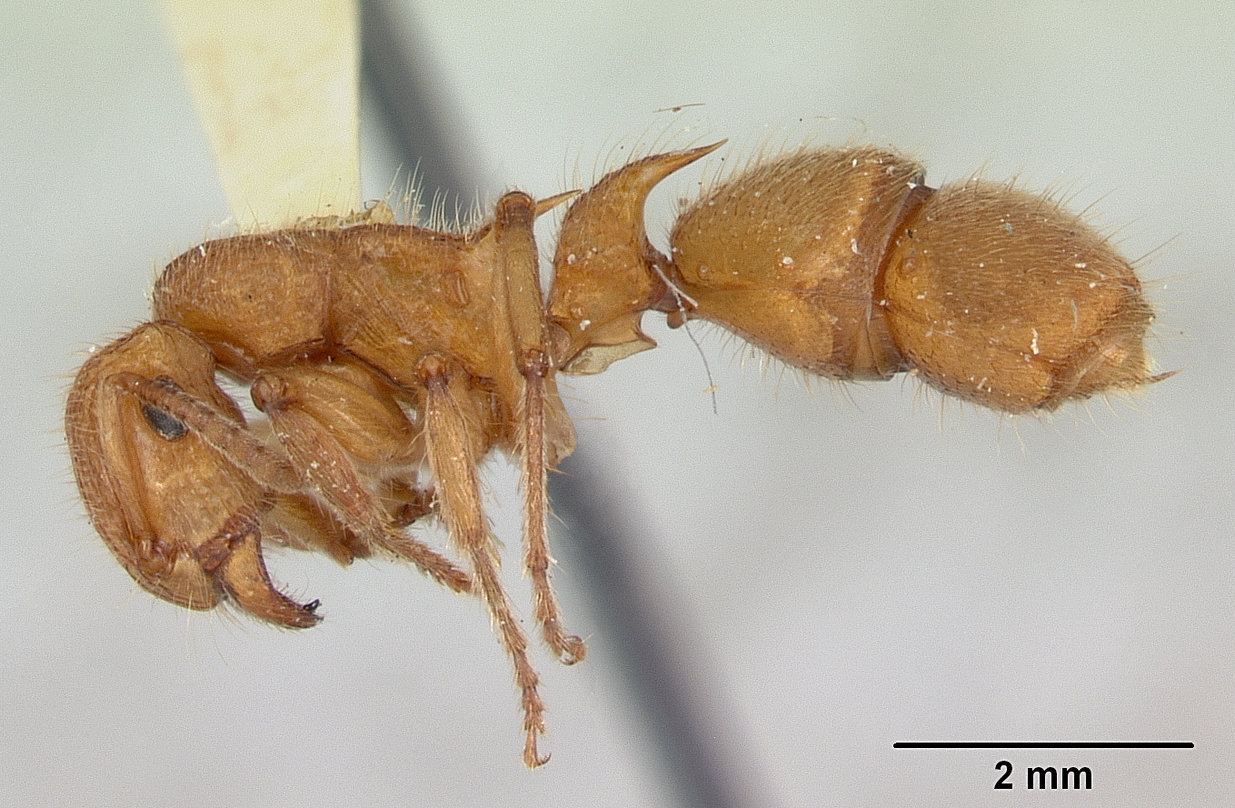

Scientific classification
- Kingdom: Animalia
- Phylum: Arthropoda
- Class: Insecta
- Order: Hymenoptera
- Family: Formicidae
- Genus: Acanthoponera
- Species: A. peruviana

Binomial name
- Acanthoponera peruviana Brown, 1958

= Acanthoponera peruviana =

Species of ant

Acanthoponera peruviana is a species of ant belonging to the genus Acanthoponera. Described in 1958 by Brown, the species is native to South America.
