= Metazygia wittfeldae =

Scientific classification
- Domain: Eukaryota
- Kingdom: Animalia
- Phylum: Arthropoda
- Subphylum: Chelicerata
- Class: Arachnida
- Order: Araneae
- Infraorder: Araneomorphae
- Family: Araneidae
- Genus: Metazygia
- Species: M. wittfeldae

Binomial name
- Metazygia wittfeldae (McCook, 1894)

Species of spider

Metazygia wittfeldae is a species of orb weaver in the spider family Araneidae. It is found in a range from the United States to Costa Rica.
