= Karl von Kraatz-Koschlau =

German geologist (1867–1900)

Alexander Karl von Kraatz-Koschlau (24 June 1867 – 18 May 1900) was a German geologist.

Karl von Kraatz-Koschlau was born in Reichenbach near Stettin. He studied philosophy and sciences in Freiburg and Munich, where he obtained his doctorate with a dissertation on tartaric acid and its salts (1892). Afterwards he was assigned to the mineralogical institute in Munich. One of his scientific excursions during this time period involved geological research of the Serra de Monchique in the Algarve.

In 1897 he received his habilitation in mineralogy from the University of Halle with a thesis on barite deposits in the Odenwald. The same year he became a professor at the Technical University of Karlsruhe. In 1900, while performing geological research in Brazil, he fell victim to yellow fever, dying in the state of Pará at the age of 32.

== Written works ==
- Beiträge zur Kenntnis der Rechtsweinsteinsäure und ihrer Salze, 1892 - Contributions to the knowledge of the law of tartaric acid and its salts.
- Der Eläolithsyenit der Serra de Monchique, sein Gang- und Contactgestein, 1896 - Elaeolite syenite of the Serra de Monchique, etc.
- Die Barytvorkommen des Odenwaldes, 1897 - Barite deposits in the Odenwald.
- Zwischen Ocean und Guamä : Beitrag zur Kenntnis des Staates Para, 1900 (with Jacques Huber 1867-1914) - Between the ocean and Guamä : Contribution to the knowledge of Pará.
