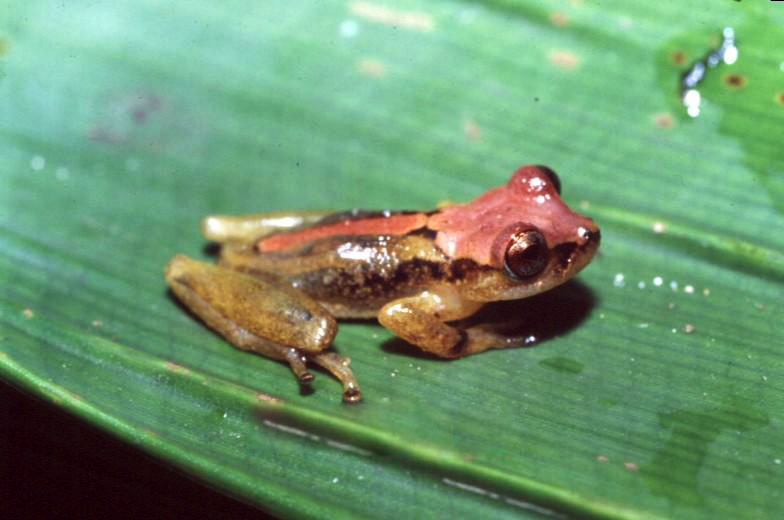

Conservation status
- Least Concern (IUCN 3.1)

Scientific classification
- Kingdom: Animalia
- Phylum: Chordata
- Class: Amphibia
- Order: Anura
- Family: Hemiphractidae
- Genus: Fritziana
- Species: F. fissilis

Binomial name
- Fritziana fissilis (Miranda-Ribeiro, 1920)

Synonyms
- Coelonotus fissilis Miranda-Ribeiro, 1920; Nototheca fissilis (Miranda-Ribeiro, 1920); Flectonotus fissilis (Miranda-Ribeiro, 1920)

= Fritziana fissilis =

Species of amphibian

Fritziana fissilis is a species of frogs in the family Hemiphractidae. It is endemic to southeastern Brazil and known from the mountains of Espírito Santo, Rio de Janeiro, São Paulo, and Rio Grande do Sul states.

== Habitat ==
The natural habitat of Fritziana fissilis is forest at elevations of 500–1,800 m (1,600–5,900 ft) asl, but it is highly tolerant to habitat disruption and can live anywhere with trees. They are found sitting on vegetation few metres above the ground, mostly in bromeliads.

Scientists have seen this frog in some protected places and there are others within the frog's known range: Área de Proteção Ambiental da Bacia do Rio Macacu, PARES dos Tres Picos, and PARNA da Tijuca.

== Reproduction ==
This frog requires bromeliad plants to breed. The female frog carries her eggs in a pouch on her back and releases the tadpoles into the water held within the bromeliads.

== Threats ==
The IUCN classfies this species as least concern. What threat it faces comes from habitat loss associated with the loss of Atlantic Forest.
