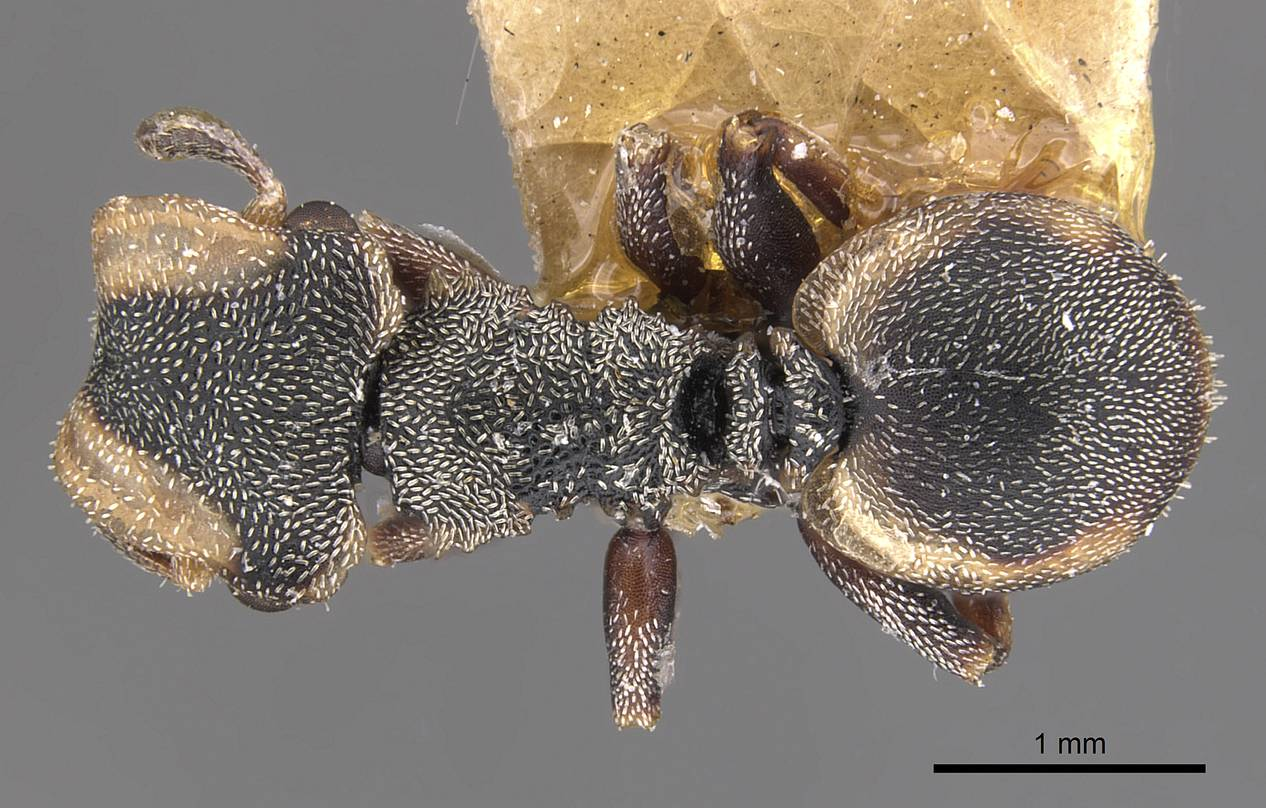

Scientific classification
- Kingdom: Animalia
- Phylum: Arthropoda
- Clade: Pancrustacea
- Class: Insecta
- Order: Hymenoptera
- Family: Formicidae
- Subfamily: Myrmicinae
- Genus: Cephalotes
- Species: C. goeldii

Binomial name
- Cephalotes goeldii (Forel, 1912)

= Cephalotes goeldii =

Species of ant

Cephalotes goeldii is a species of arboreal ant of the genus Cephalotes, characterized by an odd shaped head and the ability to "parachute" by steering their fall if they drop off of the tree they're on, giving them the name gliding ants.
