= Arua Arunsi =

Nigerian politician

Arua Arunsi is a Nigerian politician who served as a member of the House of Representatives, representing the Arochukwu/Ohafia Federal Constituency of Abia State.
