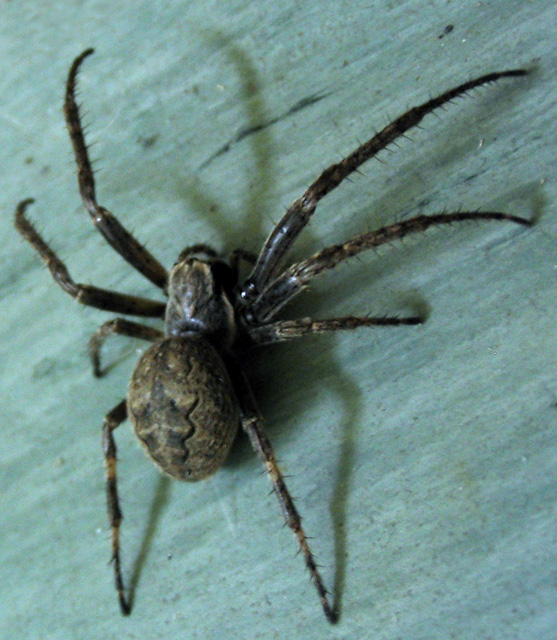
- Walnut Orb-Weaver (N. umbratica)

Scientific classification
- Kingdom: Animalia
- Phylum: Arthropoda
- Subphylum: Chelicerata
- Class: Arachnida
- Order: Araneae
- Infraorder: Araneomorphae
- Family: Araneidae
- Genus: Nuctenea; Simon, 1864

Type species
- N. umbratica (Clerck, 1757)

Species
- N. cedrorum (Simon, 1929) – Algeria; N. silvicultrix (C. L. Koch, 1835) – Europe, Russia (Europe to Far East), Kazakhstan; N. umbratica (Clerck, 1757) – Europe to Azerbaijan, Iran

Synonyms
- Cyphepeira Archer, 1951

= Nuctenea =

Genus of spiders

Nuctenea is a genus of orb-weaver spiders first described by Eugène Simon in 1895. Its most familiar member is the Walnut Orb-Weaver Spider, N. umbratica.

== Species ==
As of November 2026 it contains only three species.

- Nuctenea cedrorum (Simon, 1929) — Algeria
- Nuctenea silvicultrix (C. L. Koch, 1835) — Palearctic
- Nuctenea umbratica (Clerck, 1757) — Europe, Northern Africa, Turkey, Caucasus, Russia (Europe, Far East), Iran, Kyrgyzstan
