= Acanthoponera goeldii =

Scientific classification
- Domain: Eukaryota
- Kingdom: Animalia
- Phylum: Arthropoda
- Class: Insecta
- Order: Hymenoptera
- Family: Formicidae
- Genus: Acanthoponera
- Species: A. goeldii

Binomial name
- Acanthoponera goeldii Forel, 1912

Species of ant

Acanthoponera goeldii is a species of ant belonging to the genus Acanthoponera. Described in 1912 by Forel, the species is native to North America and South America.
