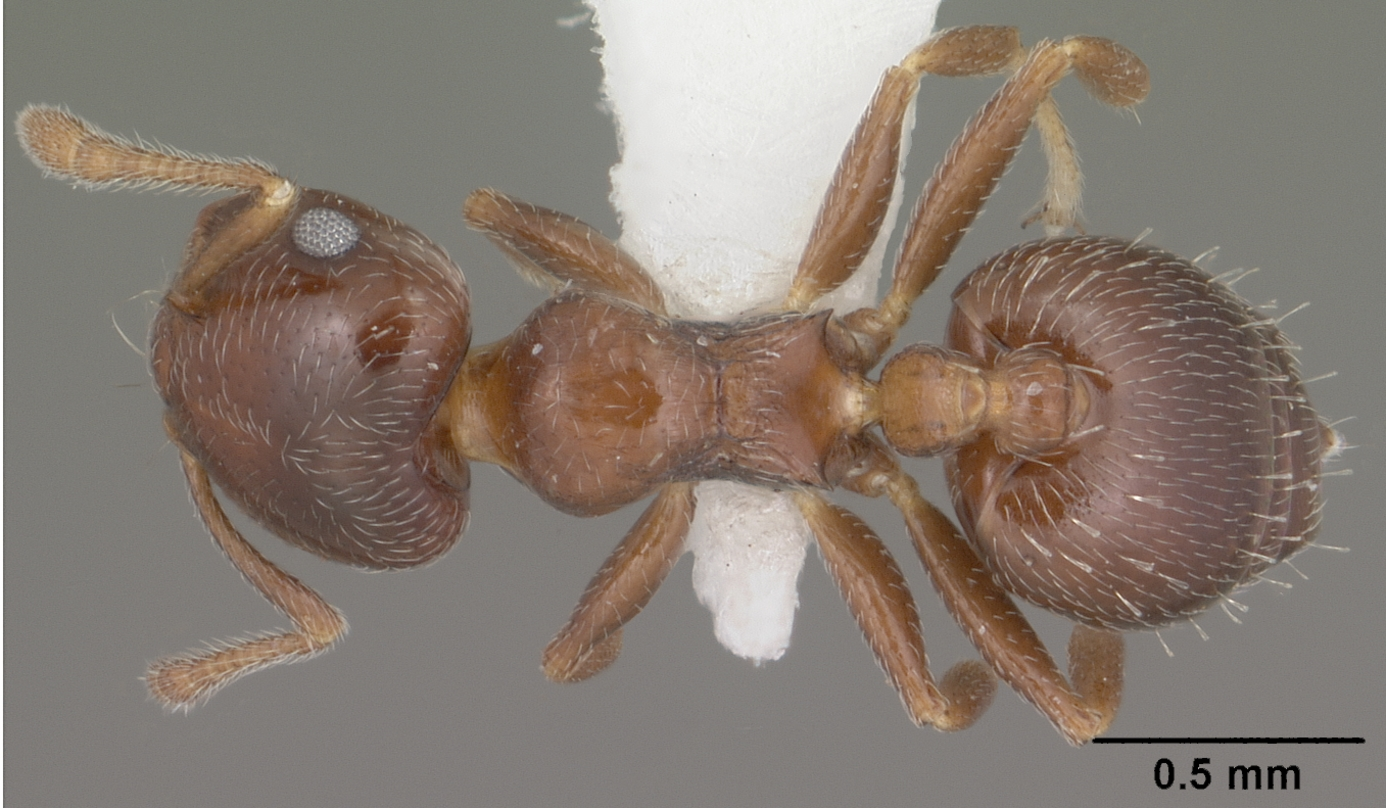

Scientific classification
- Domain: Eukaryota
- Kingdom: Animalia
- Phylum: Arthropoda
- Class: Insecta
- Order: Hymenoptera
- Family: Formicidae
- Subfamily: Myrmicinae
- Genus: Crematogaster
- Species: C. torosa

Binomial name
- Crematogaster torosa Mayr, 1870

= Crematogaster torosa =

Species of ant

Crematogaster torosa is a species of ant in the family Formicidae.

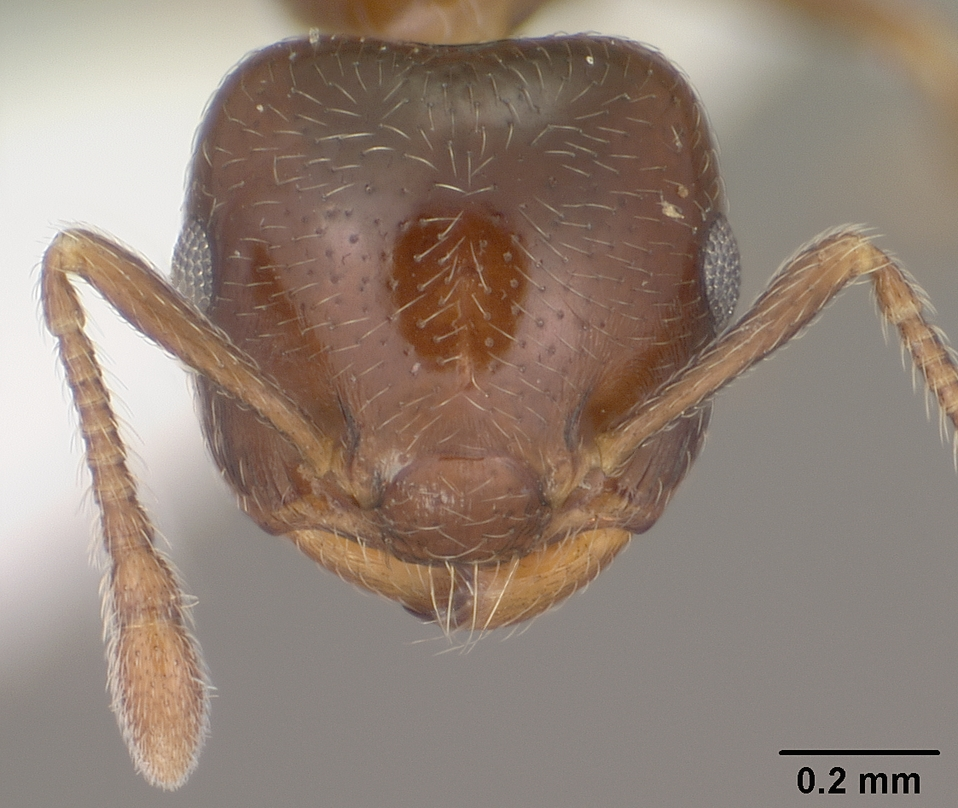

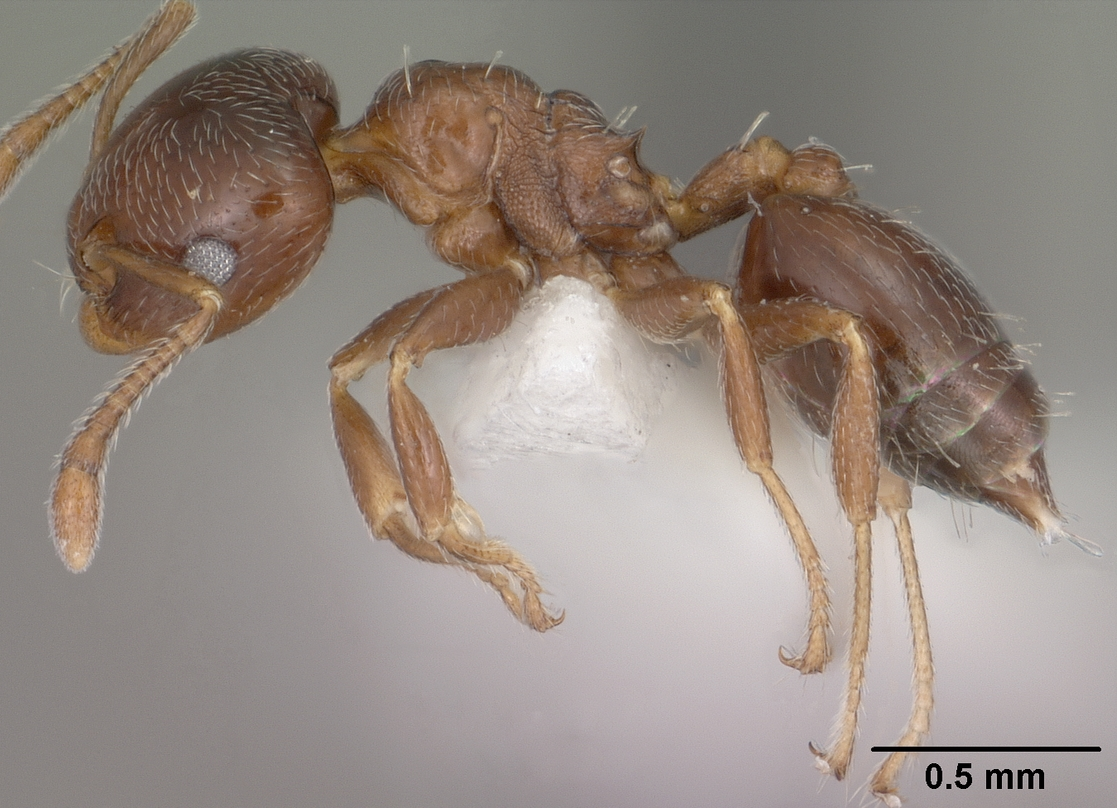

== Subspecies ==
These four subspecies belong to the species Crematogaster torosa:

- Crematogaster torosa chodati Forel, 1921^{i c g}
- Crematogaster torosa goeldii Forel, 1903^{i c g}
- Crematogaster torosa stigmatica Forel, 1911^{i c g}
- Crematogaster torosa torosa Mayr, 1870^{i c g}

Data sources: i = ITIS, c = Catalogue of Life, g = GBIF, b = Bugguide.net
