= Vršovice (Louny District) =

- Municipality
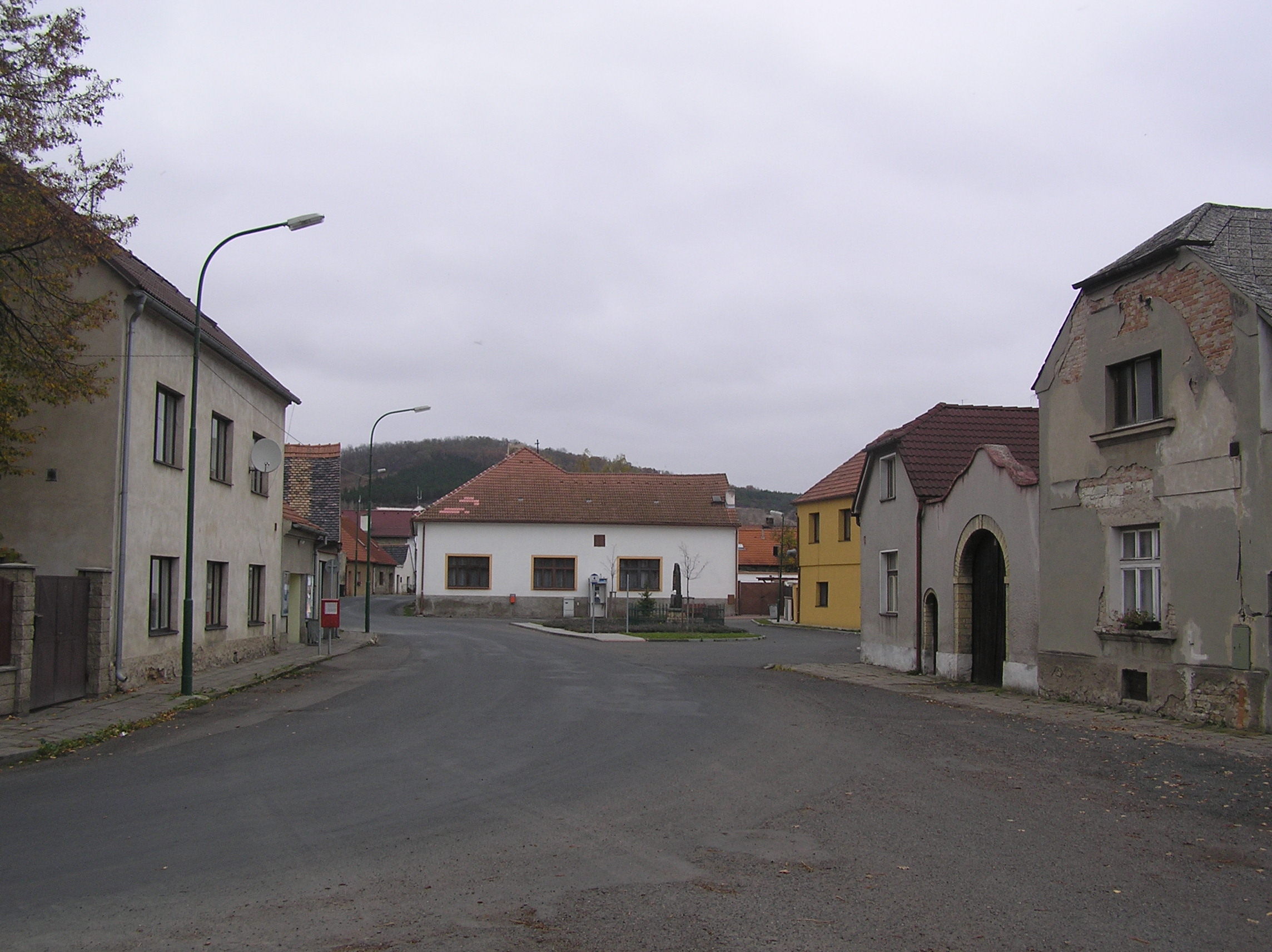
- Centre of Vršovice

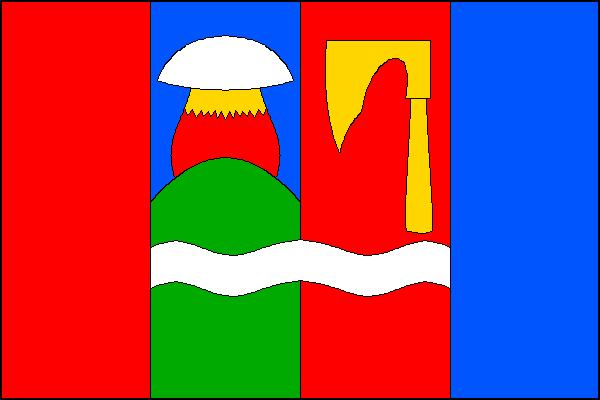
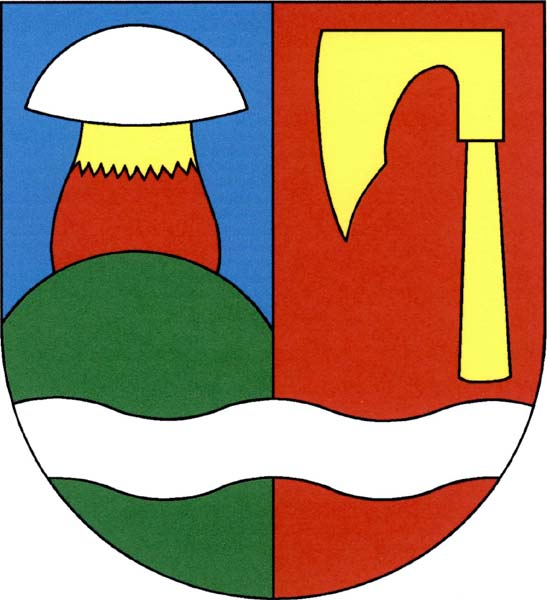
- Flag Coat of arms

- Location in the Czech Republic
- Coordinates: 50°22′7″N 13°50′32″E
- Country: Czech Republic
- Region: Ústí nad Labem
- District: Louny
- First mentioned: 1268

Area
  - Total: 5.57 km^{2} (2.15 sq mi)
- Elevation: 175 m (574 ft)

Population (2026-01-01)
  - Total: 248
  - Density: 44.5/km^{2} (115/sq mi)
- Time zone: UTC+1 (CET)
  - Summer (DST): UTC+2 (CEST)
- Postal code: 440 01
- Website: www.obecvrsovice.cz

Vršovice is a municipality and village in Louny District in the Ústí nad Labem Region of the Czech Republic. It has about 200 inhabitants.

Vršovice lies approximately 4 kilometres (2 mi) north-east of Louny, 35 km (22 mi) south-west of Ústí nad Labem and 53 km (33 mi) north-west of Prague.

== Demographics ==
Historical population
Year	Pop.	±%
1869	309	—
1880	381	+23.3%
1890	356	−6.6%
1900	560	+57.3%
1910	557	−0.5%
1921	556	−0.2%
1930	576	+3.6%
1950	433	−24.8%
1961	395	−8.8%
1970	420	+6.3%
1980	361	−14.0%
1991	223	−38.2%
2001	246	+10.3%
2011	261	+6.1%
2021	261	+0.0%
Source: Censuses
