= Domingos Soares Ferreira Penna =

Brazilian naturalist

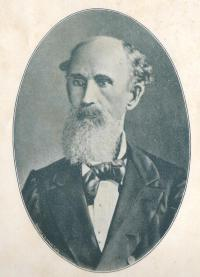
- Born: June 6, 1818; Mariana, Minas Gerais, Brazil
- Died: January 6, 1888 (aged 69); Belém, Pará, Brazil
- Known for: Founder of Museu Paraense Emílio Goeldi
- Awards: Monument dedicated in 1907 in the garden of the museum
- Scientific career
- Fields: Biology, Ethnography, Archeology
- Workplaces: Museu Paraense

Domingos Soares Ferreira Penna (June 6, 1818 – January 6, 1888) was a Brazilian naturalist from the state of Minas Gerais, who founded the Museu Paraense Emílio Goeldi, in Belém, and undertook important research in the archeology and natural resources of the lower Amazon River valley.

In 1870, he discovered one of the most important units of Cenozoic fossils in Brazil: the Pirabas Formation.

He also made important archaeological discoveries that 20th century archaeologists confirmed. In three letters published by the National Museum (1876a, 1876b, 1877), he recorded his observations on the shell mounds installed in the "dark and swampy" regions on the east coast of Pará, which he excavated, measured, and mapped, making notes on their condition, conservation, and archeological conditions — human bones, lithic and ceramic artefacts — describing them and locating them in their stratigraphic layers. He correctly identified the coastal and riverine shell mounds of Pará as villages inhabited by early fishing people, an insight that scientific archaeologists confirmed in the 1990s. Always sharing his knowledge with other scholars, he urged geologist Charles Hartt to study the shell mound of Taperinha. About 100 years later, Taperinha and several other fluvial shellmounds with pottery in the Lower Amazon were shown through radiocarbon dating and luminescence dating to be early Holocene in age, c. 9.000 to 7,000 BP calibrated, making them the earliest pottery sites yet known in the Americas and among the earliest in the world.

During his travels, he also did anthropological research. For example, in 1877 he compiled the only existing vocabulary of the Aruã language with the last remaining speaker in the town Afuá.

The Ferreira Penna Scientific Station in Melgaço, Pará state, Brazil, is named after him, as are various Amazon River boats.
