= Aruã language =

Extinct Arawakan language of Brazil

Aruã
- Native to: Brazil
- Region: Caviana, Marajó
- Ethnicity: Aruã people
- Extinct: after 1890
- Language family: Arawakan: Northern; Palikuran?; Aruã

Language codes
- ISO 639-3: None (mis)
- Glottolog: arua1264

Aruã, also known as Aruán or Aroã, is an extinct Arawakan language of Brazil. It was spoken by the Aruã people, who lived on the island Caviana and the North-East of Marajó. Aikhenvald (1999) classifies it as a close relative of Palikur.

At least seven works were written in and on the Aruã language in the 18th century by Capuchin missionaries on the island of Marajó. These have all been lost. In 1877, naturalist and anthropologist Domingos Penna compiled a vocabulary given by the last Aruã who lived in Afuá, who was around 75 years old. An excerpt from this vocabulary is given in the list below.

In the 18th century, part of the Aruã people moved to the Uaçá River in the current state Amapá, where they mixed with the Galibi, the Marworno and other peoples. Around 1890, they still spoke among each other in the Aruã language. However by 1926, no-one could be found anymore who spoke it, speaking French Creole and Portuguese instead.

== Vocabulary ==
English	Aruã
armadillo	judu
anteater	tamanúa
capybara	kaju
paca	raa
agouti	fájua / duw
mouse	hɨty
tapir	mɨle / mɨɻe
ox	tapɨra
caititu	orumáru / urumuru
deer	úite/kutʃáli
ounce	díny
dog	wawáu
monkey	puáte / pu(w)at
sauim	maɻíle / máryly
bird	kudeitále
duck	baxe
teal	maseuɻile
heron	hoa
jaburu	jawɨrru
tuiuiú	tuju
dove	otukúi
jacu	maarade
rooster	werrapáju (< tupi)
vulture	wárro / waru
pará nightingale	itúky
macaw	kuajáre (< karib?)
parakeet	kiʃekiʃe
parrot	wawátu
saracura	kuatere
hummingbird	arymokoso (< karib)
lizard	ʃaʃáry
chameleon	juana
jacuruaru	janau
snake	juruku
alligator	adule / hadulu
tortoise	wáamu (< karib)
turtle	kure
matamatá	matamatá
frog	warábo
bee	ma
butterfly	tupaupo
tick	fuɲile
little tick	maikun
mucuim	kuêjei
leech	kumatu
aninga	siny
sweet potato	kéci
gourd	wiwi
cocoa	juára-porro
cassava	kayty / kait(i)
kiss	ysahále
flour	kuáke/háihe
tucupi	katamare / ukatáka
grass	mának
cane	wiwa (< tupi)
cotton	h-áju
guava	komaʃe
passion fruit	madahále
tobacco	jameketeuko / wajami
smoking pipe	-kjáwa
pepper	at'
fan	malaj
fish hook	orapaj / putʃare
bow	-tepar-mə-ne
arrow	-tepare
harpoon / nail	totore
pants	-ʃyrola
canoe	noroáany / noroán-dey / roádai
basket	alamái (< karib?)
God	Wekoromálo
mirror	-kɨpɨ-n
shotgun	kamukáwa
do	rlápu / rap / kasipare
oven	-(po)pudi-te
church	tepauktekúi
sieve	ʃyrridje
comb	-partá-n
Bowl	moto
camutim	dykiʃe
dish	kalái
hammock	mamíke / juáte
fishing net	mamoete
clothing	-púje
salt	duny / duwe
thong	babale
