= Museu Paraense Emílio Goeldi =

Research institution and museum in Pará, Brazil

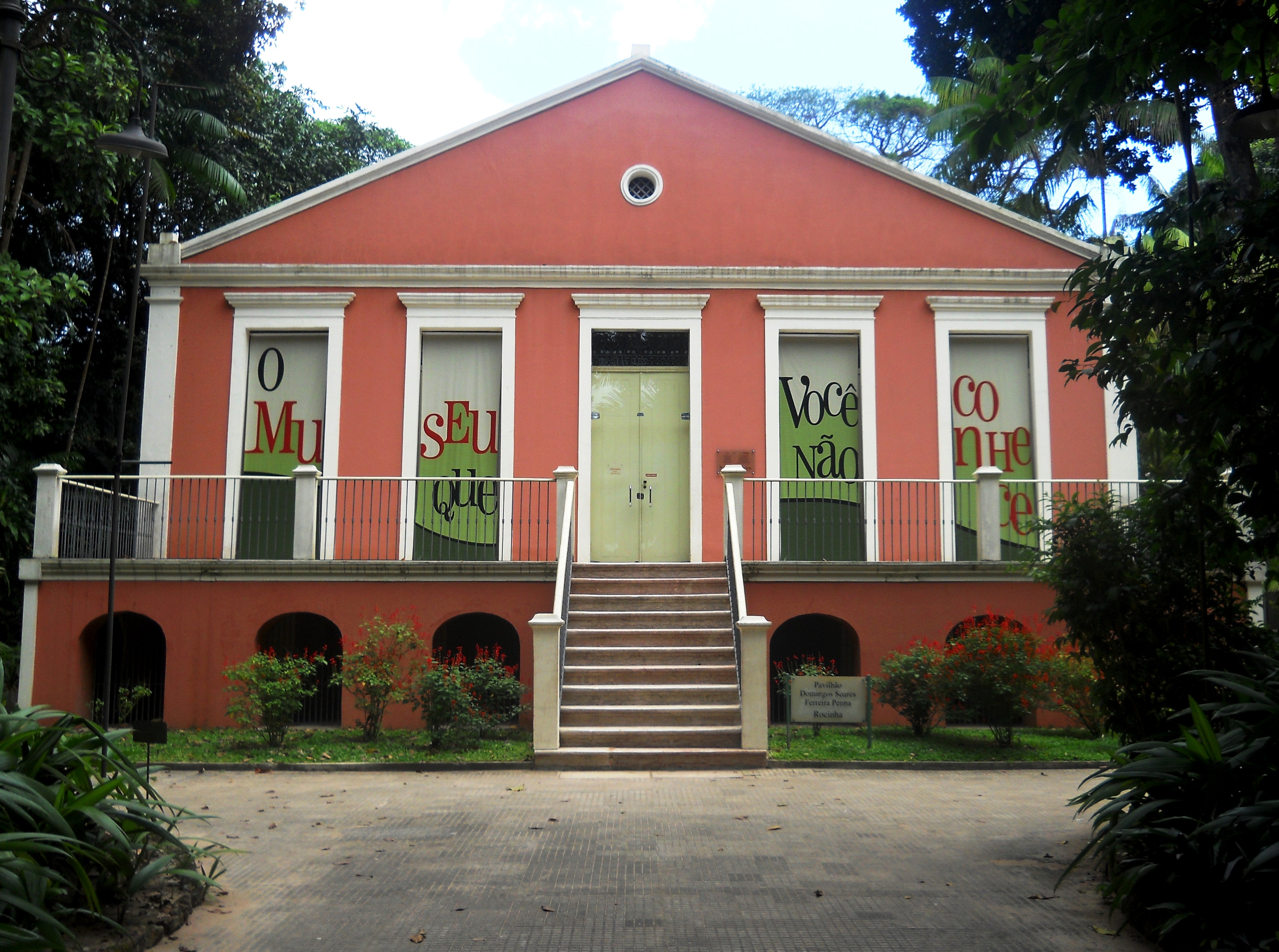
- Paraense Emílio Goeldi Museum

- Location within Brazil
- Established: 1866
- Location: Belém, Pará, Brazil
- Coordinates: 1.4525°S 48.4764°W
- Type: Natural history museum, arboretum zoological garden
- Director: Ana Luisa Albernaz
- Website: www.museu-goeldi.br

National Historic Heritage of Brazil
- Designated: 1994
- Reference no.: 536

The Museu Paraense Emílio Goeldi, commonly shortened MPEG, is a Brazilian research institution and museum located in the city of Belém, state of Pará, Brazil. It was founded in 1866 by Domingos Soares Ferreira Penna as the Pará Museum of Natural History and Ethnography, and was later named in honor of Swiss naturalist Émil August Goeldi, who reorganized the institution and was its director from 1894 to 1905. It is now the "main research center on natural systems and sociocultural processes of the Brazilian Amazon." The museum and zoological park are listed as protected sites by both the National Institute of Historic and Artistic Heritage, and the Department of Historic, Artistic and Cultural Heritage of the state of Pará.

== Activities ==
The institution has the mission of researching, cataloging and analyzing the biological and sociocultural diversity of the Amazon Basin, contributing to its cultural memory and its regional development. It has also the aim of increasing public awareness of science in the Amazon by means of its museums, botanical garden, zoological park, etc.

The Museum maintains a scientific research station in the high Amazon forest (Estação Científica Ferreira Penna), which was inaugurated in 1993, with 330 square kilometres (130 mi^{2}) in the Caxiuanã National Forest, municipality of Melgaço, Pará.

The museum provided assistance in preparing the management plan for the Grão-Pará Ecological Station between 2007 and 2011. This is a strictly protected environmental unit covering 4,245,819 hectares (10,491,650 acres) of Amazon forest created in 2006, the largest such reserve in the world.

=== Botany ===
The Museum staff in botany works in taxonomy and systematics of the Amazon flora, ethnobotany and economic botany, plant biodiversity, structure and dynamics of rain forests. A botanical garden and several botanical collections are maintained, since the first one, established in 1895 by Jacques Huber, and it has more than 200,000 specimens of seeds, fruits, woods, pollen, histological sections and exsicata (dried and pressed specimens).

=== Zoology ===
In zoology, the Museum does research on the Amazon fauna, its geographical distribution, behavior, ecology, taxonomy and systematics in mammalogy, ornithology, herpetology, ichthyology and entomology. The zoological collections include around 150,000 specimens of vertebrate whole bodies preserved in alcohol and taxidermy, skeletons, skins, eggs, anatomical parts, etc.; as well as more than 1 million specimens of invertebrates, including Arthropoda, Insecta and Mollusca.

=== Earth sciences ===
In this area, there are research groups on the evolution of Amazon ecosystems, paleontology and paleoecology of tropical regions, sedimentology, mineralogy and stratigraphy, geology, geochemistry, paleogeology and pedology (the study of soils). The paleontological collections harbored by the Museum have more than 6,000 species, and the mineralogical collections more than 1,000 samples.

=== Human sciences ===
The existence of a rich pre-history and contemporaneous history of human populations in the Amazon have motivated, since the beginning of the Museum, a host of studies in archeology, anthropology, linguistics and ethnography. The institution is probably the largest repository of such Amazonic collections in the world, with more than 120,000 pieces in the archeological collection, including lithic and ceramic artifacts, and more than 14,000 pieces in the ethnographic collection, including indigenous cultures from Brazil, Africa, Peru and Suriname. The linguistics sector studies many aboriginal languages.

== Past directors ==
João Baptista Gonçalves da Rocha (1872–1873); Joaquim Pedro Corrêa de Freitas, Diretor de Instrução Pública (1873–1881); José Coelho da Gama e Abreu, Barão de Marajó (1881–1882); Antonio Manuel Gonçalves Tocantins (1882); Domingos Soares Ferreira Penna (1882–1884); Joaquim Pedro Corrêa de Freitas (1883–1884); Hildebrando Barjona de Miranda; Abel Augusto César de Araújo (1885); Álvaro Pinto de Pontes e Souza (1886–1888); Emílio Augusto Goeldi (1894–1907); Jacques Hüber (1907–1914); Marie Emilie Snethlage (1914–1921); Rodolfo Siqueira Rodrigues (substitute); Carlos Estevão de Oliveira (1930–1936); José Cândido de Melo Carvalho (1955–1960). José Seixas Lourenço(1982-1985);Adelia Engracia de de Oliveira (1995-1999); Guilherme Mauricio Souza Marcos de La Penha(1985–1991).

== Protected status ==
The Museu Paraense Emílio Goeldi and the zoological park are listed as a historic structure by both the National Institute of Historic and Artistic Heritage (IPHAN) and the Department of Historic, Artistic and Cultural Heritage of the state of Pará. The zoological park was listed as a historic site by IPHAN in 1994 under the name Parque Zoobotânico do Museu Paraense Emílio Goeldi. The Architectural and Landscape Ensemble, Collection and Collections of the Museu Paraense Emílio Goeldi (Conjunto Arquitetônico e Paisagístico, Acervo e Coleções do Museu Paraense Emílio Goeldi) was listed as a historic site by the Department of Historic, Artistic and Cultural Heritage of the state of Pará in 1982.

== See also ==
- Pará State Museum
