= Pouch (marsupial) =

Anatomical structure of marsupials

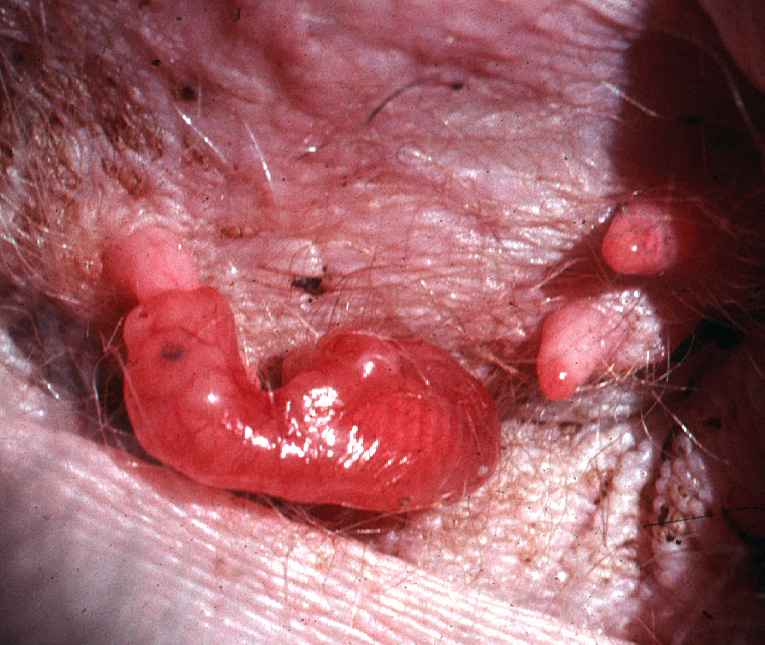
Kangaroo joey inside the pouch

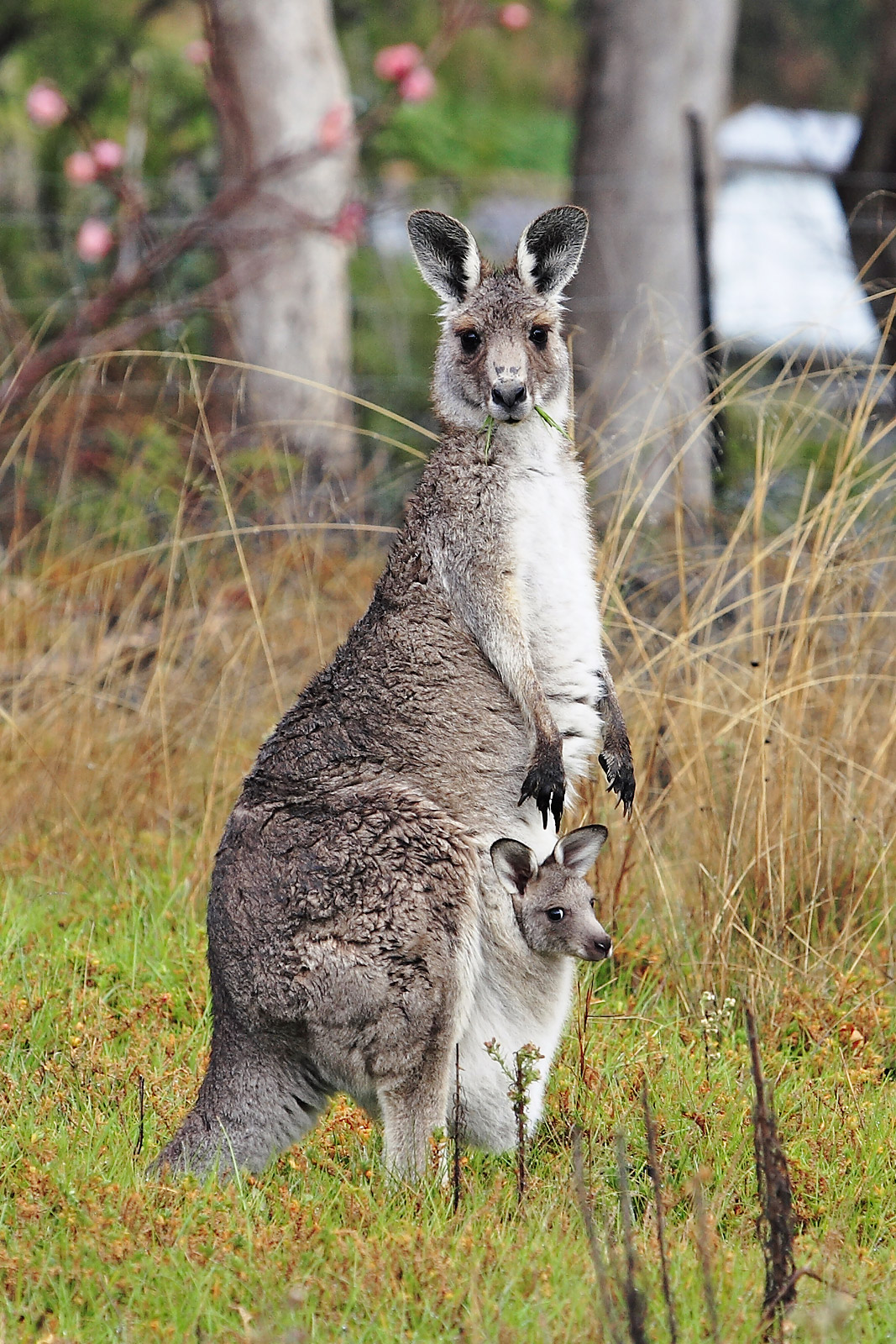
Female eastern grey kangaroo with mature joey in pouch

The pouch is a distinguishing feature of female marsupials and monotremes, and rarely in males as well, such as in the yapok and the extinct thylacine. The name marsupial is derived from the Latin marsupium, meaning "pouch". This is due to the occurrence of epipubic bones, a pair of bones projecting forward from the pelvis. Marsupials give birth to a live but relatively undeveloped foetus called a joey. When the joey is born it crawls from inside the mother to the pouch. The pouch is a fold of skin with a single opening that covers the teats. Inside the pouch, the blind offspring attaches itself to one of the mother's teats and remains attached for as long as it takes to grow and develop to a juvenile stage.

== Variations ==
The marsupial pouch shows substantial morphological variation across species, including differences in opening direction, enclosure, and teat arrangement. These different forms are often associated with ecological behavior such as climbing or burrowing. The two kinds that are distinguishable (on the front or belly): opening towards the head and extending the cavity under the skin towards the tail (forward, or up) or opening towards the tail and extending towards the front legs (to the rear, backward or down). For example for quolls and Tasmanian devils, the pouch opens to the rear and the joey only has to travel a short distance to get to the opening (resting place) of the pouch. While in the pouch they are permanently attached to the teat and once the young have developed they leave the pouch. The kangaroo's pouch opens horizontally on the front of the body, and the joey must climb a relatively long way to reach it. Kangaroos and wallabies allow their young to live in the pouch well after they are physically capable of leaving, often keeping two joeys in the pouch, one tiny and one fully developed. In kangaroos, wallabies and opossums, the pouch opens forward or up.

Female koalas have been described as having a 'backward-opening' pouch like wombats, as opposed to an upward-opening pouch like kangaroos, but that is not true. When a female koala gives birth to young her pouch opening faces neither up nor down, although it is located towards the bottom of the pouch rather than at the top. It faces straight outwards rather than 'backwards'. It sometimes appears to be 'backward-facing' because when the joey is older and leans out of the pouch, this pulls the pouch downwards or 'backwards'. The pouch has a strong sphincter muscle at the opening to prevent the joey from falling out.

In wombats and marsupial moles, the pouch opens backward or down. Backwards facing pouches would not work well in kangaroos or opossums as their young would readily fall out. Similarly, forward-facing pouches would not work well for wombats and marsupial moles as they both dig extensively underground. Their pouches would fill up with dirt and suffocate the developing young. Kangaroo mothers will lick their pouches clean before the joey crawls inside. Kangaroo pouches are sticky to support their young joey. Koalas are unable to clean out their pouches since they face backwards, so just prior to giving birth to the young koala joey, a self-cleaning system is activated, secreting droplets of an anti-microbial liquid that cleans it out. In a relatively short time, the cleansing droplets clean out all of the crusty material left inside, leaving an almost sterile environment ready to receive the tiny joey.

The water opossum and the now extinct Tasmanian tiger are the only two marsupials where the male also has a pouch (in order to protect their genitalia while swimming).

Some marsupials (e.g. phascogales) lack the true, permanent pouches seen in other species. Instead, they form temporary skin folds (sometimes called "pseudo-pouches") in the mammary region when reproducing. This type of pouch also occurs in echidnas which are monotremes. Across marsupials, variation in pouch presence reflects broader evolutionary patterns. Comparative evolutionary studies also suggest pouch presence is associated with history traits. Species with larger body sizes and smaller litter sizes are more likely to have a well-developed pouch. This is consistent with reproductive strategies that involved greater maternal investment per offspring. In contrast, small-bodies species that produce larger litters may lack a pouch. This suggest energetic trade-offs between offspring number and parental investment have influence pouch evolution.

Pouches have their own microbiota and it changes depending on reproductive stage: anoestrus, pre-oestrus, oestrus/birth, post-birth. The pouch also plays an important immunological role. Marsupial young are born without a fully developed adaptive immune system. As a result, newborns are susceptible to infection while completing their development attached to the mother's teat within the pouch. However, the pouch environment is not sterile and contains diverse microbial communities, including potential pathogens. To fight against these risks, the pouch epithelium produces antimicrobial secretions that help regulate microbial growth and maintain a controlled microbial environment. Additionally, the maternal milk contains lysozymes, immunoglobulins, transferrin, and cathelicidins which help to contribute to neonatal protection.Changes can be made to the appearance of the pouch by inducing oestrus.

== See also ==
- For more about the nature and usage of the pouch, see Marsupial § Early development
