= List of Guggenheim Fellowships awarded in 1960 =

Three hundred and three scholars and artists were awarded Guggenheim Fellowships in 1959. More than $1,400,000 was disbursed.

== 1960 U.S. and Canadian Fellows ==
Category	Field of Study	Fellow	Institutional association	Research topic	Notes	Ref
Creative Arts	Choreography	Pearl Lang	Pearl Lang Dance Theater		Also won in 1969	
Creative Arts	Drama and Performance Art	Joshua Greenfeld		Creative writing		
Creative Arts	Fiction	John Berry		Writing		
Creative Arts	Fiction	John Cheever		Writing	Also won in 1951	
Creative Arts	Fiction	Mary Lee Settle		Writing	Also won in 1957	
Creative Arts	Fiction	David Derek Stacton		Writing	Also won in 1966	
Creative Arts	Fiction	Harvey Swados	Sarah Lawrence College	Writing		
Creative Arts	Fiction	Donald Windham		Writing		
Creative Arts	Fine Arts	Harold Altman	University of Wisconsin–Madison	Drawing and printmaking	Also won in 1961	
Creative Arts	Fine Arts	David Aronson	Boston University			
Creative Arts	Fine Arts	Donald S. Bloom	Piscataway Schools	Painting		
Creative Arts	Fine Arts	Howard Bradford		Printmaking		
Creative Arts	Fine Arts	Byron Burford	University of Iowa	Painting in Holland and England		
Creative Arts	Fine Arts	Leonard Edmondson	Pasadena City College	Creative printmaking		
Creative Arts	Fine Arts	Elias Friedensohn	Queens College	Sculpting		
Creative Arts	Fine Arts	Kahlil Gibran			Also won in 1959	
Creative Arts	Fine Arts	Frank Gonzalez		Painting		
Creative Arts	Fine Arts	John Paul Jones	University of California, Los Angeles	Lithographs		
Creative Arts	Fine Arts	Seymour Lipton		Sculpture		
Creative Arts	Fine Arts	Yutaka Ohashi	School of the Museum of Fine Arts, Boston	Painting	Also won in 1959	
Creative Arts	Fine Arts	William Pachner		Painting		
Creative Arts	Fine Arts	George Warren Rickey	Newcomb College, Tulane University	Sculpting	Also won in 1961	
Creative Arts	Fine Arts	Ulfert Wilke	University of Louisville	Painting	Also won in 1959	
Creative Arts	Music Composition	Milton Babbitt	Princeton University	Composing		
Creative Arts	Music Composition	Ingolf Dahl	University of Southern California	Composing	Also won in 1951	
Creative Arts	Music Composition	Paul Fetler	University of Minnesota	Composing	Also won in 1953	
Creative Arts	Music Composition	Andrew W. Imbrie	University of California, Berkeley	Composing	Also won in 1953	
Creative Arts	Music Composition	John La Montaine		Composing	Also won in 1959	
Creative Arts	Music Composition	Marvin David Levy		Composing	Also won in 1964	
Creative Arts	Music Composition	Salvatore John Martirano		Composing		
Creative Arts	Music Composition	Robert Moffat Palmer	Cornell University	Composing	Also won in 1952	
Creative Arts	Music Composition	William Overton Smith	University of Southern California	Composing	Also won in 1961	
Creative Arts	Music Composition	Virgil Thomson		Composing		
Creative Arts	Music Composition	Vladimir Alexis Ussachevsky	Columbia University	Composing	Also won in 1956	
Creative Arts	Music Composition	Hugo Weisgall	Pennsylvania State University	Composing	Also won in 1955, 1966	
Creative Arts	Photography	Lee Friedlander		Changing American scene	Also won in 1962, 1977	
Creative Arts	Photography	Helen Levitt		Color photography	Also won in 1959, 1981	
Creative Arts	Poetry	Jane Marvel Cooper	Sarah Lawrence College	Writing		
Creative Arts	Poetry	Jean Garrigue		Writing		
Humanities	American Literature	Hennig Cohen	University of Pennsylvania	Mark Twain's career as a Washington newspaper correspondent and its influence upon his literary development		
Humanities	American Literature	Philip Calvin Durham	University of California, Los Angeles	The hero in American literature		
Humanities	American Literature	William Henry Gilman	University of Rochester	Definitive edition of the journals of Ralph Waldo Emerson	Also won in 1964	
Humanities	American Literature	Franklin Dickerson Walker	Mills College	Jack London		
Humanities	Architecture, Planning and Design	Albert Henry Detweiler	Cornell University	Effect of Lombard invasions on Roman architecture		
Humanities	Architecture, Planning and Design	Samson Lane Faison, Jr.	Williams College	German and Austrian architecture of the 18th century		
Humanities	Architecture, Planning and Design	György Kepes	Massachusetts Institute of Technology			
Humanities	Architecture, Planning and Design	Henry Hope Reed Jr.		Great Chicago Fair of 1893 and its impact on American life and culture		
Humanities	Architecture, Planning and Design	Elizabeth Wood		Book on urban renewal		
Humanities	Bibliography	Antje Bultmann Lemke	Syracuse University	Brothers Grimm		
Humanities	Biography	Robert Cecil Bald	University of Chicago	John Donne	Also won in 1946	
Humanities	Biography	Samuel Flagg Bemis	Yale University		Also won in 1954	
Humanities	Biography	William A. Swanberg		Life and times of William Randolph Hearst		
Humanities	British History	George Hilton Jones, III	Texas Technological College	Foreign policy of James II, centering on the life of Charles, second earl of Middleton		
Humanities	British History	Garrett Mattingly	Cooper Union		Also won in 1936, 1945, 1953	
Humanities	British History	Millicent Barton Rex	Madeira School	British Parliament from 1690-1948		
Humanities	Classics	Frank Edward Brown	Yale University			
Humanities	Classics	Paul A. Clement	University of California, Los Angeles	Attic and South Italian vase-painting		
Humanities	Classics	Phillip Howard DeLacy	Washington University in St. Louis	Epicureanism as a systematic philosophy		
Humanities	Classics	Agnes K. L. Michels	Bryn Mawr College			
Humanities	Classics	Inez Scott Ryberg	Vassar College	History and interpretation of certain Roman panel reliefs of the Antonine period		
Humanities	Classics	William Pitkin Wallace	University of Toronto		Also won in 1951	
Humanities	East Asian Studies	John Frank Cady	Ohio University	History of southeast Asia	Also won in 1955	
Humanities	East Asian Studies	Franz Schurmann	University of California, Berkeley	Organizational practices of the Chinese Communists, from their formative period to the present		
Humanities	English Literature	Bradford Allen Booth	University of California, Los Angeles	Letters of Robert Louis Stevenson		
Humanities	English Literature	Robert Louis Haig, Jr.	University of Illinois Urbana-Champaign	Life and works of John Dunton		
Humanities	English Literature	Gordon Sherman Haight	Yale University		Also won in 1946, 1953	
Humanities	English Literature	Joyce Hemlow	McGill University		Also won in 1951, 1966	
Humanities	English Literature	Dan H. Laurence		Shavian research	Also won in 1961, 1972	
Humanities	English Literature	Harry Thornton Moore	Southern Illinois University	Collected volume of D. H. Lawrence's works	Also won in 1958	
Humanities	English Literature	Charles Wickliffe Moorman	Mississippi Southern College	Augustinian earthly and heavenly cities in the works of certain contemporary Oxford Anglicans		
Humanities	English Literature	Constantinos A. Patrides	University of California, Berkeley	Milton's conception and presentation of the central themes of the Christian faith	Also won in 1963	
Humanities	English Literature	Charles Richard Sanders	Duke University	Letters of Thomas and Jane Welsh Carlyle	Also won in 1972	
Humanities	English Literature	Rolf Hans Soellner	Illinois Wesleyan University	Moral philosophy of the 16th century and its influence on Shakespeare's works		
Humanities	English Literature	Lionel Stevenson	Duke University	Symbolic elements in English fiction from Meredith to Conrad		
Humanities	English Literature	Joseph Anthony Ward, Jr	Southwestern Louisiana University	Henry James' conception of structure in the novel		
Humanities	Fine Arts Research	Jay R. Judson	Smith College	Venetian art in relation to Dutch and Flemish painting of the 16th and 17th centuries		
Humanities	Fine Arts Research	William R. Kenan, Jr.	University of North Carolina at Chapel Hill			
Humanities	Fine Arts Research	José López-Rey	Smith College		Also won in 1947, 1967	
Humanities	Folklore and Popular Culture	Wayland D. Hand	University of California, Los Angeles	Dictionary of American popular beliefs and superstitions	Also won in 1952	
Humanities	French History	Paul Walden Bamford	University of Minnesota			
Humanities	French History	Georg Gerson Iggers	Dillard University, Tulane University	Idea of progress in historical thought		
Humanities	French History	David H. Pinkney	University of Missouri	The French Revolution of 1830		
Humanities	French Literature	J. Christopher Herold	Stanford University Press	German Romantic movement in its European context in the late 18th and early 19th centuries		
Humanities	French Literature	Judd D. Hubert	University of California, Los Angeles	17th-century novel of adventure		
Humanities	French Literature	Mark J. Temmer	University of California, Santa Barbara	20th century French fables		
Humanities	French Literature	Frédéric Grover	Swarthmore College	Pierre Drieu La Rochelle	Also won in 1959	
Humanities	French Literature	Kurt Weinberg	University of British Columbia	Aesthetics of Baudelaire		
Humanities	General Nonfiction	Alexander Eliot				
Humanities	German and East European History	Enno Edward Kraehe	University of Kentucky	Development of the German Confederation as a barrier to Russian penetration into Europe		
Humanities	German and East European History	Henry Cord Meyer	Pomona College	Comparative study of the careers and writings of Friedrich Naumann and Walther Rathenau, as illuminating certain intellectual and social dilemmas of German society in the period 1880 to 1920		
Humanities	German and Scandinavian Literature	Hans Jaeger	Indiana University			
Humanities	German and Scandinavian Literature	Joachim Seyppel	Bryn Mawr College			
Humanities	German and Scandinavian Literature	Archer Taylor	University of California, Berkeley	Field of historical bibliography, in particular the history of subject indexes	Also won in 1927	
Humanities	German and Scandinavian Literature	Walter Silz	Harvard University		Also won in 1926	
Humanities	German and Scandinavian Literature	Stanley Newman Werbow	University of Texas at Austin	German syntax in the late medieval period		
Humanities	Iberian and Latin American History	John Leddy Phelan	University of Wisconsin	Spanish imperial bureaucracy, centering on career of Antonio de Morga		
Humanities	Italian History	Antonio Pace	Syracuse University		Also won in 1948	
Humanities	Italian Literature	John Charles Nelson	Harvard University			
Humanities	Latin American Literature	John Preston Moore	Louisiana State University	Life and times of Antonio de Ulloa		
Humanities	Linguistics	Morris Halle	Massachusetts Institute of Technology			
Humanities	Linguistics	Henry Kučera	Brown University			
Humanities	Literary Criticism	Meyer H. Abrams	Cornell University	Role of metaphor and analogy in Western thought	Also won in 1957	
Humanities	Literary Criticism	Cleanth Brooks	Yale University	William Faulkner	Also won in 1953	
Humanities	Literary Criticism	M. L. Rosenthal	New York University		Also won in 1964	
Humanities	Literary Criticism	Maurice Valency	Columbia University		Also won in 1964	
Humanities	Medieval History	John W. Baldwin	University of Michigan	Ethical thought and influence of the theologians in Paris of the 12th and 13th centuries	Also won in 1983	
Humanities	Medieval Literature	Vernon Judson Harward, Jr	City College of New York			
Humanities	Medieval Literature	Margaret Sinclair Ogden	University of Michigan	15th century English translation of Guy de Chauliac's Chirurgia Magna		
Humanities	Medieval Literature	Bartlett Jere Whiting	Harvard University			
Humanities	Music Research	Barry Shelley Brook	Queens College		Also won in 1969	
Humanities	Music Research	Philip Keppler, Jr	Smith College	Agostino Steffani		
Humanities	Music Research	Lawrence Morton	Ojai Festivals	Igor Stravinsky	Also won in 1959	
Humanities	Music Research	William Stein Newman	University of North Carolina	History of the sonata		
Humanities	Music Research	Reinhard G. Pauly	Lewis and Clark College	Johann Ernst Eberlin's music		
Humanities	Music Research	Albert Seay	Colorado College	History of music theory during the 15th century		
Humanities	Near Eastern Studies	Ignace Gelb	University of Chicago			
Humanities	Near Eastern Studies	Moshe Greenberg	University of Pennsylvania			
Humanities	Near Eastern Studies	George C. Miles	American Numismatic Society			
Humanities	Philosophy	Henry David Aiken	Harvard University			
Humanities	Philosophy	Milton K. Munitz	New York University			
Humanities	Religion	William David Davies	Union Theological Seminary		Also won in 1966	
Humanities	Religion	Langdon Brown Gilkey	Vanderbilt University	Relations between the Christian concept of Providence and the secular concepts interacting with it since the 17th century	Also won in 1965	
Humanities	Religion	William R. Hutchison	American University	Protestant thought in the United States, 1870-1914		
Humanities	Religion	Clyde L. Manschreck	Duke University	Thought of Philip Melanchthon		
Humanities	Renaissance History	Gene Adam Brucker	University of California, Berkeley	Politics and society in Florence, 1382-1417		
Humanities	Renaissance History	Elisabeth Feist Hirsch	Trenton State College			
Humanities	Russian History	James H. Billington	Harvard University			
Humanities	Russian History	Zbigniew Brzezinski	Harvard University			
Humanities	Russian History	Wacław J. Solski				
Humanities	Slavic Literature	Horace Gray Lunt	Harvard University			
Humanities	Spanish and Portuguese Literature	Juan Bautista Avalle-Arce	Ohio State University	Theory and practice of Spanish Golden Age thought, 1500-1600		
Humanities	Spanish and Portuguese Literature	Raúl Alfredo Del Piero	University of California, Berkeley	Unpublished works of Alfonso Martinez de Toledo		
Humanities	Spanish and Portuguese Literature	Allen W. Phillips	University of Chicago		Also won in 1973	
Humanities	Theatre Arts	Norris Houghton	Vassar College	Arts of the theatre abroad	Also won in 1934, 1935	
Humanities	Theatre Arts	Ann Hitchcock Holmes	Houston Chronicle	Theatre, music and art in America at mid-20th-century		
Humanities	United States History	George Athan Billias	University of Maine	Biography of Elbridge Gerry		
Humanities	United States History	Henry Steele Commager	Amherst College	History of American nationalism		
Humanities	United States History	Vincent P. DeSantis	University of Notre Dame	Political history of the United States from 1877-1897		
Humanities	United States History	Joseph C. Kiger	University of Alabama	National learned societies in the United States		
Humanities	United States History	Albert D. Kirwan	University of Kentucky	Life and times of John Jordan Crittenden		
Humanities	United States History	Robert Douthat Meade	Randolph-Macon Woman's College	Life and times of Patrick Henry	Also won in 1953	
Humanities	United States History	William Gerald McLoughlin	Brown University	The Baptist in colonial New England		
Humanities	United States History	Robert Edgar Riegel	Dartmouth College	History of American feminism		
Humanities	United States History	James Morton Smith	College of William and Mary	Kentucky and Virginia Resolutions with special reference to the question of the relationship between liberty and authority in free society		
Humanities	United States History	Marion Tinling	National Historical Publications Commission	William Byrd II's letters		
Humanities	United States History	Thurman Wilkins	Columbia University			
Natural Sciences	Applied Mathematics	Chia-Chiao Lin	Massachusetts Institute of Technology		Also won in 1954	
Natural Sciences	Astronomy and Astrophysics	William A. Baum	Palomar Observatory and Mount Wilson Observatory	Factors affecting the resolution of a cascaded type of image converter		
Natural Sciences	Astronomy and Astrophysics	Marshall H. Cohen	Cornell University	Generation and propagation of radio waves in the sun's atmosphere	Also won in 1980	
Natural Sciences	Astronomy and Astrophysics	George Brooks Field	Princeton University	Radio astronomy		
Natural Sciences	Astronomy and Astrophysics	Paco Lagerstrom	California Institute of Technology	Mathematical fluid dynamics		
Natural Sciences	Astronomy and Astrophysics	Donald E. Osterbrock	University of Wisconsin	Magnetohydrodynamics as applied to astrophysics	Also won in 1982	
Natural Sciences	Astronomy and Astrophysics	Hans Panofsky	Pennsylvania State University	Turbulence		
Natural Sciences	Astronomy and Astrophysics	Zdeněk Sekera	University of California, Los Angeles	Effect of dust and haze particles on heat radiation in the atmosphere	Also won in 1956	
Natural Sciences	Astronomy and Astrophysics	Samuel Silver	University of California, Berkeley	Physics of the upper atmosphere	Also won in 1953	
Natural Sciences	Astronomy and Astrophysics	Harold Zirin	University of Colorado	The sun		
Natural Sciences	Chemistry	Richard McLean Badger	California Institute of Technology	Molecular structure by means of infrared spectroscopy		
Natural Sciences	Chemistry	Louis Coombs Weller Baker	Boston University			
Natural Sciences	Chemistry	Andre Jacques de Bethune	Boston College			
Natural Sciences	Chemistry	Howard Tasker Evans, Jr.	U.S. Geological Survey			
Natural Sciences	Chemistry	David Ginsburg	Technion			
Natural Sciences	Chemistry	Edward David Goldberg	Scripps Institution of Oceanography	New ways to determine the age of rocks under oceans		
Natural Sciences	Chemistry	James Lynn Hoard	Cornell University	Complex crystalline structure	Also won in 1946, 1966	
Natural Sciences	Chemistry	Harold Sledge Johnston	University of California, Berkeley	Chlorine atom reactions		
Natural Sciences	Chemistry	Alexander Jerry Kresge	Brookhaven National Laboratory	Kinetics of acid-catalysed slow proton transfer reaction with special emphasis on aromatic substitution		
Natural Sciences	Chemistry	Ralph Livingston	Oak Ridge National Laboratory	Microwave and radio-frequency spectroscopy		
Natural Sciences	Chemistry	John L. Margrave	University of Wisconsin	Chemical reactions at high temperatures and pressures		
Natural Sciences	Chemistry	Max Smith Matheson	Argonne National Laboratory			
Natural Sciences	Chemistry	Jerrold Meinwald	Cornell University	Application of conformational principles to the chemistry of natural products	Also won in 1976	
Natural Sciences	Chemistry	Willis Bagley Person	University of Iowa	Theoretical and experimental studies of molecular complexes		
Natural Sciences	Chemistry	James N. Pitts, Jr.	University of California, Irvine			
Natural Sciences	Chemistry	William H. Saunders, Jr.	University of Rochester	Isotope effects and isotopic tracers with relation to the mechanisms of organic reactions		
Natural Sciences	Chemistry	Wolfgang Manfred Schubert	University of Washington	Electronic effect of molecular grouping in certain aromatic organic substances		
Natural Sciences	Chemistry	Leo Harry Sommer	Pennsylvania State University			
Natural Sciences	Chemistry	Gordon Stone	Harvard University			
Natural Sciences	Chemistry	Herbert Henry Uhlig	Massachusetts Institute of Technology			
Natural Sciences	Chemistry	William Cooper Wildman	National Heart Institute	Isolation of toxic properties of the plant family amaryllidaceae for possible development of new medical drugs		
Natural Sciences	Earth Science	William Francis Brace	Harvard University			
Natural Sciences	Earth Science	Alan Judson Faller	Woods Hole Oceanographic Institution			
Natural Sciences	Earth Science	James Gilluly	United States Geological Survey			
Natural Sciences	Earth Science	Thane H. McCulloh	University of California, Riverside			
Natural Sciences	Earth Science	George Gaylord Simpson	Harvard University			
Natural Sciences	Earth Science	Lloyd William Staples	University of Oregon	Mineralogy and geological implications on the occurrences of zeolites		
Natural Sciences	Earth Science	John Verhoogen	University of California, Berkeley	Geodynamic processes	Also won in 1953	
Natural Sciences	Engineering	Daniel Charles Drucker	Brown University			
Natural Sciences	Engineering	Earl Randall Parker	University of California, Berkeley	Theory of plastic flow and fracture		
Natural Sciences	Engineering	Ronald F. Probstein	Brown University			
Natural Sciences	Engineering	Reinhardt Mathias Rosenberg	University of California, Berkeley	Field of vibrations of nonlinear bi-modal systems		
Natural Sciences	Geography and Environmental Studies	Allan L. Rodgers	Pennsylvania State University			
Natural Sciences	Mathematics	David Keun Cheng	Syracuse University			
Natural Sciences	Mathematics	Israel Nathan Herstein	Cornell University	Ring theory and the theory of finite groups	Also won in 1968	
Natural Sciences	Mathematics	Ernest A. Michael	University of Washington			
Natural Sciences	Mathematics	Edgar Reich	University of Minnesota			
Natural Sciences	Mathematics	Hartley Rogers, Jr.	Massachusetts Institute of Technology			
Natural Sciences	Mathematics	P. Emery Thomas	University of California, Berkeley	Algebraic topology		
Natural Sciences	Mathematics	Hsien Chung Wang	Northwestern University			
Natural Sciences	Medicine and Health	Earl Dorchester Hanson	Yale University			
Natural Sciences	Medicine and Health	Lester C. Mark	Columbia University			
Natural Sciences	Medicine and Health	Wilder Penfield	McGill University Neurological Institute	Medical education		
Natural Sciences	Medicine and Health	Philip Troen	Harvard Medical School, Beth Israel Hospital	Research at the Karolinska Institute		
Natural Sciences	Medicine and Health	Robert Lawrence Vernier	University of Minnesota			
Natural Sciences	Medicine and Health	Richard Wagner	Tufts College			
Natural Sciences	Molecular and Cellular Biology	Konrad Bloch	Harvard University		Also won in 1953, 1975	
Natural Sciences	Molecular and Cellular Biology	Germaine Cohen-Bazire	University of California, Berkeley	Regulation of the synthesis of structural units in bacterial cells		
Natural Sciences	Molecular and Cellular Biology	Dwain Douglas Hagerman	Harvard University			
Natural Sciences	Molecular and Cellular Biology	John William Kelly	University of Oklahoma	Chemical processes involved in the manufacture of protein by normal and cancer cells	Also won in 1957	
Natural Sciences	Molecular and Cellular Biology	Leon Jacobs	National Institutes of Health	Toxoplasmosis		
Natural Sciences	Molecular and Cellular Biology	Arthur Lindenbaum	Argonne National Laboratory			
Natural Sciences	Molecular and Cellular Biology	John Raphael Laughnan	University of Illinois, Urbana-Champaign	Botany and plant genetics in agronomy, studies of certain gene complexes in maize		
Natural Sciences	Molecular and Cellular Biology	Robert Murdoch Lewert	University of Chicago	Immunity to the oriental blood fluke, a parasitic infection in some areas of the Philippines		
Natural Sciences	Molecular and Cellular Biology	Julian B. Marsh	University of Pennsylvania			
Natural Sciences	Molecular and Cellular Biology	Hsien Chang Meng	Vanderbilt University	Lipid transport and metabolism		
Natural Sciences	Molecular and Cellular Biology	John Grissim Pierce	University of California, Los Angeles	Chemistry of the proteins of the microsomal particles of cells	Also won in 1975	
Natural Sciences	Molecular and Cellular Biology	Arnold Warren Ravin	University of Rochester	Chemical bases of heredity		
Natural Sciences	Molecular and Cellular Biology	Warren S. Rehm	University of Louisville School of Medicine	Field of gastric acid production		
Natural Sciences	Molecular and Cellular Biology	Archibald Frank Ross	Cornell University	Interaction of unrelated plant viruses		
Natural Sciences	Molecular and Cellular Biology	Wendell Meredith Stanley	University of California, Berkeley	Viruses and nucleic acids to prove all cancers are caused by viruses		
Natural Sciences	Molecular and Cellular Biology	Edward Arthur Steinhaus	University of California, Berkeley	United system of diagnosing insect diseases		
Natural Sciences	Molecular and Cellular Biology	Knud George Swenson	Oregon State College	Aphid transmission of legume viruses		
Natural Sciences	Molecular and Cellular Biology	Jui Hsin Wang	Yale University		Also won in 1972	
Natural Sciences	Molecular and Cellular Biology	Finn Wold	University of Illinois, Urbana-Champaign	Protein tertiary structure		
Natural Sciences	Molecular and Cellular Biology	Ralph Stoner Wolfe	University of Illinois, Urbana-Champaign	Ecology of microbes as related to their physiology and metabolism	Also won in 1975	
Natural Sciences	Organismic Biology and Ecology	Ursula Helen Knight Abbott	University of California, Davis	Normal avian development by analysis of malformations of diverse origin		
Natural Sciences	Organismic Biology and Ecology	Robert Day Allen	Princeton University	Theories of amoeboid movement	Also won in 1965	
Natural Sciences	Organismic Biology and Ecology	Richard Mitchell Bohart	University of California, Davis	Studies leading to a generic revision of the families Vespidae and Sphecidae in North America		
Natural Sciences	Organismic Biology and Ecology	Demorest Davenport	University of California, Santa Barbara	Manner in which certain fishes and crabs are protected from the stinging cells and feeding reactions of the anemone among whose poisonous tentacles they live	Also won in 1952	
Natural Sciences	Organismic Biology and Ecology	Charles Richard Grau	University of California, Davis	Nutrition of isolated animal organs		
Natural Sciences	Organismic Biology and Ecology	Donald Redfield Griffin	Harvard University			
Natural Sciences	Organismic Biology and Ecology	Morgan Harris	University of California, Berkeley	Cell growth and population dynamics		
Natural Sciences	Organismic Biology and Ecology	Hans Albert Hochbaum	Delta Waterfowl Research Station			
Natural Sciences	Organismic Biology and Ecology	James Malcolm Moulton	Bowdoin College	Acoustical study of marine life of the Great Barrier Reef		
Natural Sciences	Organismic Biology and Ecology	John Robert "Red" Raper	Harvard University			
Natural Sciences	Organismic Biology and Ecology	William Harrison Telfer	University of Pennsylvania			
Natural Sciences	Organismic Biology and Ecology	Frank Nelson Young, Jr.	Indiana University			
Natural Sciences	Physics	James LeRoy Anderson	Stevens Institute of Technology			
Natural Sciences	Physics	Peter L. Auer	General Electric Research Laboratory			
Natural Sciences	Physics	Franz R. Brotzen	Rice Institute	Plastic deformation of body-centered cubic crystals		
Natural Sciences	Physics	George Bernard Benedek	Harvard University			
Natural Sciences	Physics	Robert W. Birge	University of California, Berkeley	Theoretical high-energy particle physics		
Natural Sciences	Physics	John W. Cahn	General Electric Research Laboratory			
Natural Sciences	Physics	Martin Deutsch	Massachusetts Institute of Technology		Also won in 1953	
Natural Sciences	Physics	Robert Martin Eisberg	University of Minnesota			
Natural Sciences	Physics	Paul P. Ewald	Brooklyn Polytechnic Institute	Historical, geographical, and factual development of the field of X-ray crystallography		
Natural Sciences	Physics	Bernard Taub Feld	Massachusetts Institute of Technology		Also won in 1953	
Natural Sciences	Physics	Eldon Earl Ferguson	University of Texas	Molecular vibration intensities		
Natural Sciences	Physics	William Bache Fretter	University of California, Berkeley	Relationship of one particle to another in the nucleus of the atom		
Natural Sciences	Physics	Leonard Seymour Goodman	Argonne National Laboratory			
Natural Sciences	Physics	Paul Handler	University of Illinois, Urbana-Champaign	Surfaces of solids by means of the quadrupole interaction in nuclear magnetic resonance of techniques		
Natural Sciences	Physics	James P. Hartnett	University of Minnesota	Heat and mass transfer		
Natural Sciences	Physics	Robert Dickson Hill	University of Illinois, Urbana-Champaign	High energy physics		
Natural Sciences	Physics	Ralph P. Hudson	Purdue University			
Natural Sciences	Physics	Richard Victor Jones	Harvard University			
Natural Sciences	Physics	Robert Karplus	University of California, Berkeley	Theoretical physics of elementary particles	Also won in 1973	
Natural Sciences	Physics	Pieter Hendrik Keesom	Purdue University	Measurement of specific heat at very low temperatures		
Natural Sciences	Physics	Walter David Knight	University of California, Berkeley	Electronic structure of metals		
Natural Sciences	Physics	Willis Eugene Lamb, Jr.	University of Arizona			
Natural Sciences	Physics	Dillon Edward Mapother	University of Illinois, Urbana-Champaign	Experimental properties of superconducting elements		
Natural Sciences	Physics	Henry Margenau	Yale University			
Natural Sciences	Physics	Robert E. Marshak	University of Rochester	Theoretical studies in elementary particle physics	Also won in 1953, 1967	
Natural Sciences	Physics	Theodore Burton Novey	Argonne National Laboratory			
Natural Sciences	Physics	Abraham Pais	Princeton University			
Natural Sciences	Physics	David Mark Ritson	Massachusetts Institute of Technology			
Natural Sciences	Physics	Harold Emil Rorschach, Jr.	Rice Institute	Properties of liquid Helium-3		
Natural Sciences	Physics	Henry S. Sommers, Jr.	David Sarnoff Research Center			
Natural Sciences	Physics	Herbert Max Steiner	University of California, Berkeley	High energy physics		
Natural Sciences	Physics	Frank Sargent Tomkins	Argonne National Laboratory			
Natural Sciences	Physics	Shigueo Watanabe	University of São Paulo			
Natural Sciences	Physics	Richard Wilson	Harvard University		Also won in 1968	
Natural Sciences	Plant Sciences	Robert Wayne Allard	University of California, Davis	Roles of direct processes vs. chance processes in the genetic populations of certain plants	Also won in 1954	
Natural Sciences	Plant Sciences	Ernest Aubrey Ball	North Carolina State College	Experimental plant embryology		
Natural Sciences	Plant Sciences	Harold H. Biswell	University of California, Berkeley	History of fire in the development and structure of vegetarion in areas of Mediterranean climate		
Natural Sciences	Plant Sciences	Theodore W. Bretz	University of Missouri	Etiology, epidemiology and control of diseases affecting coniferous plantation species in Europe		
Natural Sciences	Plant Sciences	James E. Canright	Indiana University			
Natural Sciences	Plant Sciences	John Edward Grafius	Michigan State University	Statistical genetics and its application to plant breeding		
Natural Sciences	Plant Sciences	Terry Walter Johnson, Jr.	Duke University	Marine fungi		
Natural Sciences	Plant Sciences	Daniel Archibald Livingstone	Duke University	Relations between organisms and their environment in prehistoric times in the East African tropics		
Natural Sciences	Plant Sciences	Jacques Rousseau	La Sorbonne			
Natural Sciences	Plant Sciences	George Ledyard Stebbins	University of California, Davis	Certain mutant genotypes of barley	Also won in 1953	
Natural Sciences	Plant Sciences	Howard Coombs Stutz	Brigham Young University	Origin of cultivated rye		
Natural Sciences	Statistics	Z. William Birnbaum	University of Washington			
Natural Sciences	Statistics	Lincoln E. Moses	Stanford University	Statistical problems in epidemiology and in biological research		
Social Sciences	Anthropology and Cultural Studies	Ernest Stanley Dodge	Peabody Essex Museum	Artifacts brought back from the Pacific by Captain James Cook		
Social Sciences	Anthropology and Cultural Studies	Morton H. Fried	Columbia University			
Social Sciences	Anthropology and Cultural Studies	Alice Marriott	University of Oklahoma, Stovall Museum	Chouteau family	Also won in 1947	
Social Sciences	Economics	Hollis B. Chenery	Stanford University	Certain governments in stimulating economic growth		
Social Sciences	Economics	Walter D. Fisher	Kansas State University	Mathematical economics		
Social Sciences	Economics	Frank Hindman Golay	Cornell University	Comparative studies of economic nationalism in Malaya and in the Philippines		
Social Sciences	Economics	Jonathan R. T. Hughes	Purdue University	Interaction between industrial development and trade among the major Western industrial nations since the Napoleonic wars		
Social Sciences	Economics	Stanley Reiter	Purdue University	Theory of economic organization, with special reference to forms of organization and the behavior of economic units		
Social Sciences	Economics	Arthur M. Ross	University of California, Berkeley	European industrial conflicts with their counterparts in countries just beginning to industrialize		
Social Sciences	Economics	Peter O. Steiner	University of Wisconsin	Governmental decision making and its effect on industry		
Social Sciences	Law	Charles Fairman	Harvard Law School			
Social Sciences	Law	Laurens H. Rhinelander	University of Virginia	British Restrictive Trade Practices Act 1956		
Social Sciences	Political Science	Herbert A. Deane	Columbia University			
Social Sciences	Political Science	Wesley R. Fishel	Michigan State University	Japanese reparations problem and its settlement		
Social Sciences	Psychology	John W. Atkinson	University of Michigan	Theory of human motivation		
Social Sciences	Psychology	Leonard W. Doob	Yale University			
Social Sciences	Psychology	Mary Henle	The New School for Social Research		Also won in 1950	
Social Sciences	Psychology	Carl Pfaffmann	Brown University			
Social Sciences	Psychology	William Edgar Vinacke	University of Hawaii	Effect upon human thinking of motivational and emotional conditions		
Social Sciences	Sociology	Vernon J. Parenton	Louisiana State University	Recent social and cultural changes in the French-speaking societies of Eastern Canada and Louisiana, compared to France		

== 1960 Latin American and Caribbean Fellows ==
Category	Field of Study	Fellow	Institutional association	Research topic	Notes	Ref
Creative Arts	Fiction	Bienvenido Santos		Writing		
Creative Arts	Fine Arts	Rodolfo Abularach		Painting	Also won in 1959	
Creative Arts	Fine Arts	Tomás Batista Encarnación		Sculpting		
Creative Arts	Fine Arts	Jorge Damiani		Painting	Also won in 1959	
Creative Arts	Fine Arts	María Luisa Pacheco		Painting	Also won in 1958, 1959	
Creative Arts	Music Composition	Mario Davidovsky		Composing	Also won in 1961	
Creative Arts	Music Composition	Héctor Tosar	National Conservatory of Music, Montevideo	Composing	Also won in 1946	
Creative Arts	Poetry	Agustí Bartra			Also won in 1948, 1949	
Humanities	Folklore and Popular Culture	Andrew Salkey				
Humanities	General Nonfiction	Rosa Chacel			Also won in 1959	
Humanities	Iberian and Latin American History	Delfina López Sarrelangue	National University of Mexico			
Humanities	Literary Criticism	Antonio Sánchez Barbudo	University of Wisconsin	Works of Benito Perez Galdos	Also won in 1947	
Natural Science	Astronomy and Astrophysics	Alercio Moreira Gomes	University of Brazil			
Natural Science	Chemistry	Oscar Luis Galmarini	University of Buenos Aires			
Natural Science	Earth Science	Raúl Narciso Dessanti	National Geology and Mining Service, Rio de Janeiro; National University of Buenos Aires			
Natural Science	Mathematics	Alexandre Augusto Martins Rodrigues	University of São Paulo			
Natural Science	Mathematics	Gonzalo Zubieta Russi	National University of Mexico			
Natural Science	Molecular and Cellular Biology	Angel O. Pogo	University of Buenos Aires		Also won in 1959	
Natural Science	Neuroscience	Guillermo R. J. Pilar	University of Buenos Aires		Also won in 1962	
Natural Science	Neuroscience	Teresa Pinto-Hamuy	University of Chile			
Natural Science	Organismic Biology and Ecology	Eustorgio Méndez	Gorgas Memorial Laboratory			
Natural Science	Organismic Biology and Ecology	Dalcy de Oliveira Albuquerque	National Museum of Brazil		Also won in 1957	
Natural Science	Organismic Biology and Ecology	Genaro O. Ranit	University of the Philippines		Also won in 1961	
Natural Science	Organismic Biology and Ecology	Isolda Rocha e Silva Albuquerque	National Council of Research, Rio de Janeiro		Also won in 1959	
Natural Science	Physics	Sergio Mascarenhas Oliveira	University of São Paulo			
Natural Science	Plant Science	Luis A. Camargo Gutiérrez	National University of Colombia		Also won in 1958	
Natural Science	Plant Science	Armando T. Hunziker	National University of Córdoba		Also won in 1978	
Natural Science	Plant Science	José Ploper	Tucumán Agricultural Experiment Center		Also won in 1956	
Natural Science	Plant Science	Oscar Tovar	National University of San Marcos		Also won in 1959	
Social Sciences	Anthropology and Cultural Studies	Juan Robe Munizaga Villavicencio	University of Chile			
Social Sciences	Political Science	Hugh Worrell Springer	University of the West Indies			

== See also ==
- Guggenheim Fellowship
- List of Guggenheim Fellowships awarded in 1959
- List of Guggenheim Fellowships awarded in 1961
