= Winslow Eliot =

American writer (born 1956)

- Born: August 19, 1956 (age 70); New York City, U.S.
- Education: Michael Hall; Scripps College
- Occupation: Novelist
- Spouse: Tom Stier (m. 1986)
- Children: 2
- Relatives: Eliot family
- Writing career
- Genre: Non-fiction
- Website: winsloweliot.com

Winslow Eliot (born August 19, 1956), also known as Ellie Winslow, is an American novelist and nonfiction writer. She is the author of ten novels, which have been translated into twelve languages including Greek, Swedish, French, Italian, and Japanese, and have been published in twenty countries.

== Writing career ==
Eliot is the author of Bright Face of Danger (originally published by St. Martin's Press in 1993; and re-released by Telemachus Press in 2010). Bright Face of Danger has been published in four separate French editions as Fatale Vengeance (Harlequin) and as L'Innocence du Mal (Mira Books-France and Harlequin Bestsellers 2009).

Heaven Falls was published by Telemachus Press in March 2010 and won 1st place in the 2011 Reader Views Award - Romance Category. The Happiness Cure was published in 2013 and A Perfect Gem and Pursued were published in 2011. The Wine-Dark Sea, Painted Secrets, Red Sky At Night, A Distant Light, and Roman Candles were published under the pseudonym Ellie Winslow by Signet/NAL. The Wine-Dark Sea was bought by ITC in Hollywood (now defunct), and made into a screenplay.

Nonfiction books include WriteSpa: An Oasis for Writers, a compilation of writing practices and an accompanying workbook. What Would You Do If There Was Nothing You Had To Do? Practices to Create Your Life The Way You Want It To Be (WriteSpa Press 2013) won three awards, including winner in Self-Help/Spiritual category from the Indie Excellence Book Awards and finalist in Self Help and in New Age Nonfiction from the Next Generation Independent Book Publishers Awards.

Eliot was a contributing author to Area, the Oriental Rug Magazine for many years, and was a reader for the Independent Film Project in New York City. She also contributed to the Illustrated Atlas of Native American History (Saraband 1999) Ed. Samuel W. Crompton. Eliot's contribution: "Accommodation, Exchange, and Warfare 1600 – 1700." She is listed as the editor for Waldorf Book of Breads, published by Steinerbooks in 2010.

== Personal life ==
Eliot was born on August 19, 1956, in New York City. When she was two years old, her father, the art editor of Time magazine, received a Guggenheim Fellowship and the family moved to Spain. Her parents decided to leave Time Inc., and remain abroad. They spent several years living in Greece and took a freighter trip from Yugoslavia to Japan. They lived in Rome, Italy for three years, where Eliot attended the Overseas School of Rome. In 1967 the family moved to Sussex, England, where she enrolled at Michael Hall School, a school based on Waldorf method of education. After receiving her high school diploma in 1974, she moved to Claremont, California, where she attended Scripps College. Graduating in 1977 with a degree in Modern European Studies, she then attended the Publishing Procedures Course at Radcliffe College. Afterward, Eliot moved to New York City, where she worked at several publishing houses and magazines, including Simon & Schuster, Doubleday, Time, and Fortune magazine. From 1983 to 1986, five of her romance novels were published by Rapture Romance, a publishing line produced by New American Library.

In 1986, Eliot married Tom Stier, and in 1988 they had their first child, Samantha Stier; in 1990 a son, Eliot Stier, was born. In 1993, her first mainstream novel was published by St. Martin's Press: The Bright Face of Danger. In 1996, the family moved to Great Barrington, Massachusetts, where she taught at the Great Barrington Rudolf Steiner School and later at the Great Barrington Waldorf High School.

Eliot received her Waldorf High School Teaching diploma from the Center for Anthroposophy in Keene, NH in 2005. Herself a Waldorf graduate, she is an advocate for Waldorf education. From 2005 to 2007, she taught English and worked as the Community Relations Director at the Honolulu Waldorf School in Hawai’i. When she returned to Massachusetts, she published two more novels: Heaven Falls, A Perfect Gem., and The Happiness Cure.

== Family background ==
Many of Eliot's ancestors were also writers: she is the daughter of Alexander Eliot, former Art Editor of Time magazine, and the writer Jane Winslow Eliot. Her great-great-grandfather, Charles W. Eliot, was president of Harvard University for fifty years and revamped the American college Liberal Arts curriculum. He was also famous for establishing the Harvard Classics, a still-utilized "Five Foot Shelf" of essential books. Her great-great-grandmother, Ada Davenport Kendall was a leading journalist who spent several months in prison for protesting in support of women's suffrage; she is a direct descendant of Edward Winslow, who came to America on the Mayflower. Another direct ancestor, John Eliot, translated the Bible into Algonquin in the seventeenth century. T.S. Eliot is a sixth cousin. Her grandmother, Ethel Cook Eliot, wrote children's books (The House Above the Trees, The Wind Boy), teenage mysteries, and adult novels (Ariel Dances, Green Doors).

== Books ==
=== As by Winslow Eliot ===
- Bright Face of Danger(St Martin's Press 1993, Telemachus Press 2010)
- Heaven Falls(Telemachus Press, March 2010)
- A Perfect Gem(Telemachus Press, March 2011)
- Pursued(Telemachus Press, October 2011
- The Happiness Cure Writespa Press, April 2013
- What Would You Do If There Was Nothing You Had To Do? Practices to create your life the way you want it to be.
- WriteSpa-An Oasis for Writers: Writing through the Year
- Illustrated Atlas of Native American History (Saraband 1999) Ed. Samuel W. Crompton. Eliot's contribution: "Accommodation, Exchange, and Warfare 1600 – 1700."

=== Romance novels as by Ellie Winslow ===
- The Wine-Dark Sea (Signet/NAL 1983)
- Painted Secrets (Signet/NAL 1984)
- Red Sky At Night (Signet/NAL 1985)
- A Distant Light (Signet/NAL 1986)
- Roman Candles (Signet/NAL 1987)

=== Reviews and reader comments ===
Publishers Weekly (Spring 1994); Reader Views (Spring 2011); Rendezvous (now obsolete) (Spring 1994); Romantic Times (1984, 1985); Cut to the Chase Reviews (Fall 2010); Precisely Mine (Spring 2011); WebbWeavers (Spring 2010); Amazon; Barnes and Noble

== Other works ==
=== Poetry ===
Eliot also writes poetry. In 1995 she co-founded the Saturn Series Weekly Poetry Readings in New York City, which continues to be a popular weekly venue for new and established poets and performance artists.

WriteSpa – An Oasis for Writers is a newsletter that Eliot distributes to a subscriber mailing list as well as posting on her web site.

Daily Happinesses – Since 2007, Eliot has posted daily writing inspirations that have created an international grass-roots following.

=== Film ===
In 1994 ITV Productions (now defunct) in Hollywood bought the rights to all Signet's Rapture Romance line. The Wine-Dark Sea was made into a screenplay for the pilot of a romance series for cable television.

Eliot is a member of Romance Writers of America and the Red Room.
