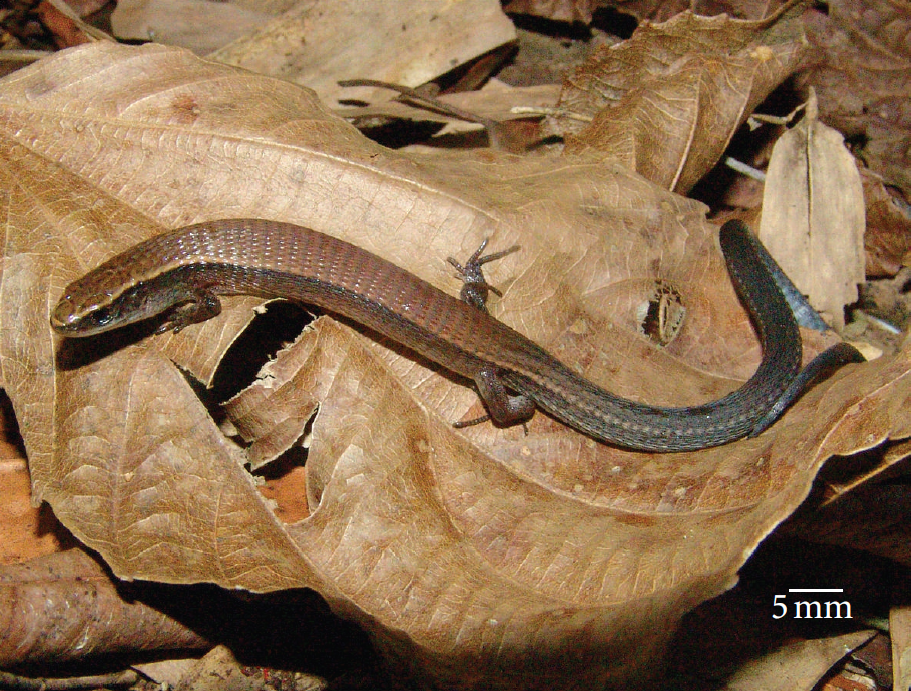
- Colobodactylus taunayi

Scientific classification
- Kingdom: Animalia
- Phylum: Chordata
- Class: Reptilia
- Order: Squamata
- Family: Gymnophthalmidae
- Tribe: Heterodactylini
- Genus: Colobodactylus; Amaral, 1933

= Colobodactylus =

Genus of lizards

Colobodactylus (common name: Amaral's teiids) is a small genus of lizards in the family Gymnophthalmidae. The genus is endemic to Brazil.

== Species ==
There are two species in the genus Colobodactylus.

- Colobodactylus dalcyanus Vanzolini & Ramos, 1977 - Vanzolini's teiid
- Colobodactylus taunayi Amaral, 1933 - Taunay teiid

== Etymology ==
The specific name, dalcyanus, is in honor of Brazilian entomologist Dalcy de Oliveira Albuquerque (1902–1982).

The specific name, taunayi, is in honor of Brazilian historian Afonso d'Escragnolle Taunay (1876–1958).
