= Guia pelas Colleccões do Museu Paulista =

1907 book by Rodolpho von Ihering

- Editor: Hermann von Ihering
- Author: Rodolpho von Ihering
- Published: 1907
- Publisher: Cardozo, Filho & Cia

Guia pelas Colleccões do Museu Paulista is a book by Rodolpho von Ihering, organized by Hermann von Ihering, on the collections of the Museu Paulista, particularly those pertaining to zoology. It was released in 1907, by Cardozo, Filho & Cia., from São Paulo.

The book is considered the most important reference on the museum collections before Afonso d'Escragnolle Taunay became the director of the institution. It reveals the secondary role the historical collection was given at the beginning of the 20th century, as the main mission was seen as improving scientific knowledge, especially on natural history. The book indicates there were specific rooms for birds, mammals and insects; there also were rooms on paleontology, mineralogy and anthropology.

Guia da Secção Histórica do Museu Paulista, by Taunay, is perceived as a "critique" to the Ihering's publication. In this book, Taunay emphasizes the museum historical collection.
