= Margaret Sinclair =

Margaret Sinclair may refer to:

- Margaret Sinclair (nun) (1900–1925), Scottish Roman Catholic nun
- Margaret P. Sinclair (1950–2012), Canadian mathematics educator
- The maiden name of Margaret Trudeau
- Margaret Sinclair, Countess of Caithness, see William Sinclair, 2nd Earl of Caithness
- Margaret Sinclair Ogden (1909–1988), American historian and lexicographer
