= Rex (surname) =

Rex may refer to:

- Adam Rex (born 1973), American illustrator and author of children's books
- George Rex (1765–1839), British-born entrepreneur
- Isaac Rex (born 1998), American football player
- Jim Rex (born 1941), the 16th and current South Carolina Superintendent of Education
- John Rex (1925–2011), British sociologist
- Knud Rex (1912–1968), Danish stage and film actor
- Ludwig Rex (1888–1979), German film actor of the silent era
- Marcus Rex (1886–1971), the last British Resident of Perak during the World War II waged in British Malaya
- Millicent Barton Rex (1901–1966), American historian, educator
- Rico Rex (born 1976), former German pair skater
- Robley Rex (1901–2009), World War I-era veteran and, at the age of 107, one of two remaining U.S. veterans related to the First World War
- Simon Rex (born 1974), American actor and comedian
- Theresa Rex, Danish actress and singer
