= List of directors of the National Museum of Brazil =

Document of the First Congregation of the National Museum, under the presidency of Friar Custódio Alves Serrão, on March 1, 1842.

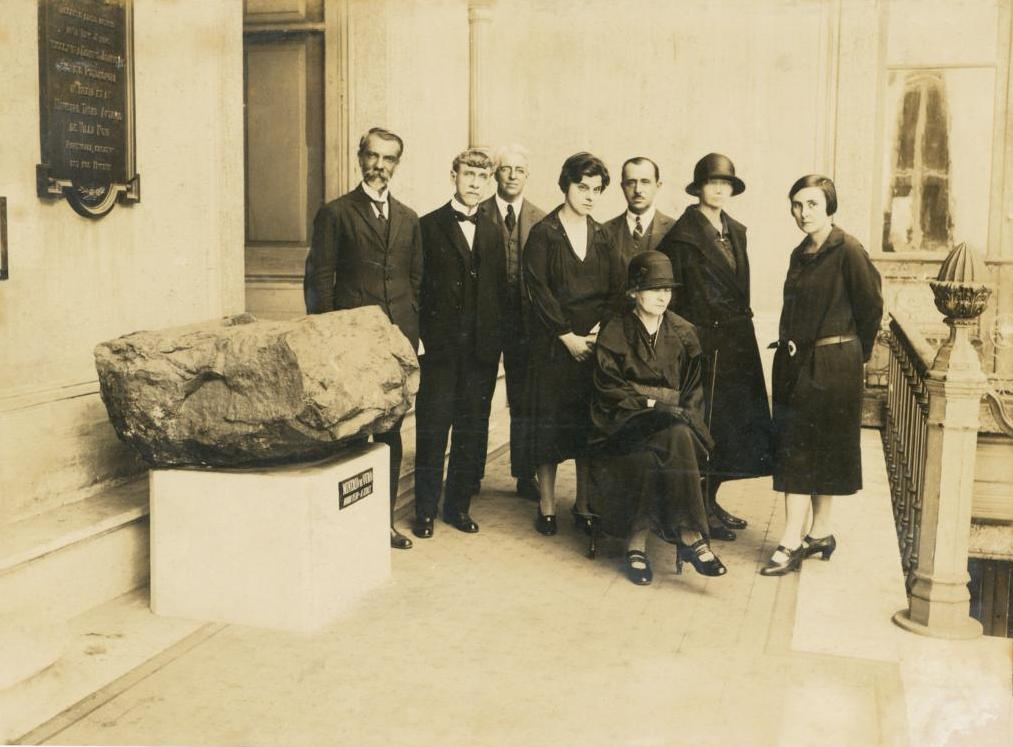
Visit of Marie Curie and her daughter, Irene Joliot-Curie, to the National Museum of Rio de Janeiro on August 2, 1926. Marie Curie (seated) is portrayed and, standing from left to right: Alípio de Miranda; Alípio de Miranda; unidentified man; Hermillo Bourguy de Mendonça; Heloísa Alberto Torres (the first woman director of the National Museum); Alberto Betim Paes Leme (director of the National Museum); Irene Joliot-Curie; and Bertha Lutz.

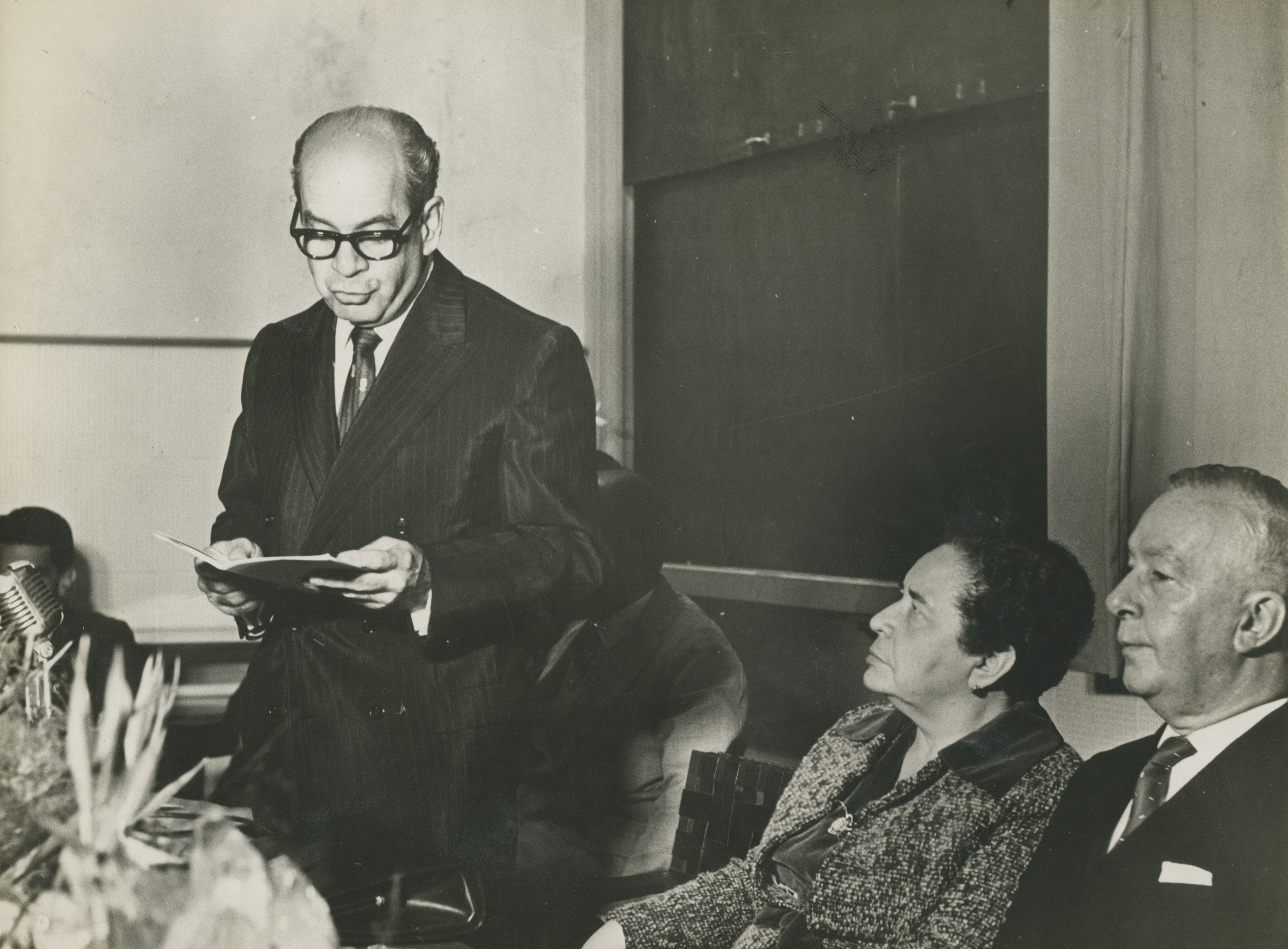
Induction of Luís de Castro Faria as director of the National Museum in 1964.

This is a list of directors of the National Museum of Brazil. The National Museum is one of Brazil's scientific institutions.

Image	Name	Administration
	José da Costa Azevedo	1818-1822
	João de Deus e Mattos	1822-1823
	João da Silva Caldeira	1823-1827
	Custódio Alves Serrão	1828-1847
	Frederico Leopoldo Cezar Burlamaqui	1847-1866
	Francisco Freire Alemão	1866-1870
	Ladislau de Souza Mello e Netto	1874-1893
	Amaro Ferreira das Neves-Armond	1892-1893
	Domingos José Freire Junior	1893-1895
	João Batista de Lacerda	1895-1915
	Bruno Álvares da Silva Lobo	1915-1923
	Artur Neiva	1923-1926
	Edgard Roquette-Pinto	1926-1935
	Alberto Betim Paes Leme	1935-1938
	Heloísa Alberto Torres	1937-1955
	José Cândido de Melo Carvalho	1955-1961
	Newton Dias dos Santos	1961-1963
	Luís de Castro Faria	1964-1967
	José Lacerda de Araújo Feio	1967-1971
	Dalcy de Oliveira Albuquerque	1972-1976
	Luis Emygdio de Mello Filho	1976-1980
	José Henrique Millan	1982-1985
	Leda Dau	1980-1982; 1986-1989
	Arnaldo dos Santos Campos Coelho	1990-1993
	Janira Martins Costa	1994-1998
	Luiz Fernando Dias Duarte	1998-2002
	Sérgio Alex Kugland de Azevedo	2003-2010
	Cláudia Rodrigues Ferreira de Carvalho	2010-2018
	Alexander Kellner	2018-
