= Atractus albuquerquei =

Conservation status
- Least Concern (IUCN 3.1)

Scientific classification
- Kingdom: Animalia
- Phylum: Chordata
- Class: Reptilia
- Order: Squamata
- Suborder: Serpentes
- Family: Colubridae
- Genus: Atractus
- Species: A. albuquerquei

Binomial name
- Atractus albuquerquei Cunha & Nascimento, 1983

Species of snake

Atractus albuquerquei, commonly known as the Albuquerque ground snake, is a species of small burrowing snake in the subfamily Dipsadinae of the family Colubridae. The species is endemic to South America.

== Etymology ==
The specific name, albuquerquei, is in honor of Brazilian entomologist Dalcy de Oliveira Albuquerque (1902–1982).

== Habitat ==
Atractus albuquerquei prefers forested areas and Cerrado habitats, at altitudes from sea level to 1,600 m (5,200 ft).

== Geographic range ==
Atractus albuquerque is found in the Brazilian states of Acre, Goias, Mato Grosso, Mato Grosso do Sul, Pará, and Rondônia, and in Bolivia.

== Description ==
Atractus albuquerquei is dark brown to black dorsally, and cream or yellow ventrally. It has smooth dorsal scales. It can grow to a total length (tail included) of 77 cm (30.3 in).

== Reproduction ==
Atractus albuquerquei is oviparous.
