= Colobodactylus dalcyanus =

Conservation status
- Endangered (IUCN 3.1)

Scientific classification
- Kingdom: Animalia
- Phylum: Chordata
- Class: Reptilia
- Order: Squamata
- Family: Gymnophthalmidae
- Genus: Colobodactylus
- Species: C. dalcyanus

Binomial name
- Colobodactylus dalcyanus Vanzolini & Ramos, 1977

Species of lizard

Colobodactylus dalcyanus, also known commonly as Vanzolini's teiid, is a species of lizard in the family Gymnophthalmidae. The species is endemic to Brazil.

== Etymology ==
The specific name, dalcyanus, is in honor of Brazilian entomologist Dalcy de Oliveira Albuquerque (1902–1982).

== Geographic range ==
C. dalcyanus is found in the Brazilian state of São Paulo.

== Habitat ==
The preferred natural habitats of C. dalcyanus are forest and rocky areas.

== Reproduction ==
C. dalcyanus is oviparous.
