= Godfrey Davies =

English historian

Godfrey Davies FBA (13 May 1892 – 28 May 1957) was an English historian of the 17th century and member of the research staff of the Huntington Library. The Mississippi Valley Historical Review summarized his contributions by noting: "Through his published works he came to be recognized as a leading authority in seventeenth-century English history, and through his innumerable services to British and American students who have worked at the Huntington Library during the past quarter of a century he made a leading contribution not only to his own but also to many fields of historical scholarship."

== Early life, family, and education ==
Godfrey Davies was born on 13 May 1892 at Cirencester, Gloucestershire, the second son of (Sir) Thomas Davies (d. 1939), Member of Parliament for Cirencester and Tewkesbury, 1918–1929. Godfrey was educated at Chipping Campden Grammar School and was elected in 1910 to a Townsend Scholarship at Pembroke College, Oxford, where he received his second class bachelor's degree in modern history on 26 November 1914 and his master's degree on 26 May 1917. He married Margret Fitz Randolph Gay (1901-1989) on 17 June 1939. The couple are buried in the Mountain View Columbarium.

== Professional career ==
As early as 1915, C. H. Firth, the Regius Professor of History at Oxford from 1904 to 1925, used Davies an assistant. In that year, as Davies related it, Firth entrusted him to "try my 'prentice hand on the task of preparing them for the press." As Firth's assistant, Davies became a member of the Faculty of Modern History at the University of Oxford from 1919 until Firth's retirement in 1925. After Firth's death in 1936, Davies wrote the memoir of Firth's life for the Proceedings of the British Academy published in 1937, edited for publication Firth's A Commentary on Macaulay's History of England (Macmillan, 1938), saw through publication Firth's posthumously published Essays, Historical and Literary (Oxford University Press, 1938) and completed his Regimental History of Cromwell's Army (1940). Davies' mentor and his working library remained an inspiration throughout Davies' career. In the introduction to his last major book, The Restoration of Charles II, 1658-1660 (1955), Davies wrote "Though Sir Charles Firth had passed away before I wrote a sentence of this book, his inspiration has remained with me until its completion. Much of it has been written from books and pamphlets that were once his. The memory of many conversations with him has often guided me in my researches and composition. My debt to him is greater than I can find words to acknowledge."

In February 1923, a joint committee of the Royal Historical Society and the American Historical Society nominated Davies to be the editor of what would become Davies' most widely used work, Bibliography of British History. Stuart Period, 1603–1714. Sir Charles Firth played an important role for Davies in compiling this work. As Davies noted in his introduction to the first edition in 1928, "He has assisted at every stage of the growth of this bibliography; his library and unrivalled store of knowledge were always open to me. he has read the typescripts and the proofs, and encouraged me in every way."

In 1925, the University of Chicago appointed Davies an assistant professor of history. Five years later, in 1930, he joined the research staff of the Huntington Library, rising to become its chairman in 1949–1951. He also served as editor of the Huntington Library Quarterly from 1937 to 1948. In 1930, the California Institute of Technology appointed him an associate professor, a post he held until his death in 1957. Between 1938 and 1945, he was also a lecturer in history at the University of California, Los Angeles.

He lived the latter part of his life in San Marino, California, where he was a research scholar at the Huntingdon Library. The British Academy elected him a Corresponding Fellow and Pembroke College, Oxford, elected him an Honorary Fellow in 1955. He died on 28 May 1957 in Los Angeles.

== Publications ==
- Dundee Court-martial Records: 1651. Clarke Papers, vol. 21, S.l.: S.n., 1917.
- Autobiography of Thomas Raymond and Memoirs of the family of Guise of Elmore, Gloucestershire; edited for the Royal Historical Society by G. Davies, Camden, Third Series, vol. 28. (London, 1917).
- A Student's Guide to the Manuscripts Relating to English History in the Seventeenth Century in the Bodleian Library. Helps for Students of History, No. 47. (London: New York: Society for Promoting Christian Knowledge; Macmillan, 1922).
- The Early History of the Coldstream Guards. (Oxford: Clarendon Press, 1924).
- Papers of devotion of James II : being a reproduction of the MS. in the handwriting of James the Second now in the possession of Mr. B. R. Townley Balfour with an introduction by Godfrey Davies. Publications of the Roxburghe Club, no. 181. (London: Roxburghe Club, 1928).
- Bibliography of British History: Stuart Period, 1603–1714. (Oxford: Clarendon Press, 1928; 2nd edition, 1970).
- The Early Stuarts, 1603–1660. Oxford History of England, vol. 9. (Oxford: Clarendon Press, 1937, 1945, 1959).
- Essays, Historical & Literary, by C. H. Firth and Godfrey Davies. (Oxford: Clarendon Press, 1938).
- The Leveller Tracts, 1647–1653, edited by William Haller and Godfrey Davies. (New York: Published by Columbia University Press in Cooperation with Henry E. Huntington Library and Art Gallery, 1944; reprinted Gloucester, Mass.: P. Smith, 1964).
- The Regimental History of Cromwell's army by Sir Charles Firth ... assisted by Godfrey Davies. (Oxford: Clarendon Pres, 1940).
- The Western country in 1793: reports on Kentucky and Virginia ed. by Marion Tinling and Godfrey Davies. (San Marino: Huntington Library, 1948).
- The Fortunes & Misfortunes of the Famous Moll Flanders &c. . . by Daniel Defoe. Introduction by Godfrey Davies. New York [and Toronto]: Rinehart & Co., Inc. [1949])
- Supplements to the Short-title Catalogue, 1641–1700, by Mary Isabel Frey, Godfrey Davies, Donald Goddard Wing, and W. H. Hutchinson. . San Marino, Calif.: [Henry E. Huntington Library and Art Gallery,], 1953).
- Wellington and His Army. (Oxford: Basil Blackwell, 1954).
- G. A. Henty and History. 1955.
- The Restoration of Charles II, 1658–1660. (San Marino: Huntington Library Publications, 1955; Oxford University Press: London, 1969).
- The works of John Dryden, edited by H.T. Swedenberg, associate editors: Frederick M. Carey, Godfrey Davies, Hugh G. Dick, Samuel H. Monk, John Harrington Smith. (Berkeley: University of California Press, 1956) volume 1.
- Essays on the Later Stuarts. (Huntington Library Publications. San Marino, Calif.: Huntington Library, 1958; reprinted Westport: Greenwood Press, 1975). [Pages 125-133 contain a "Bibliography of the Writings of Godfrey Davies."]

== Papers ==
The Godfrey Davies Papers and Correspondence are located at the Huntington Library, San Marino, California, USA, and consist of 4,500 pieces in 128 boxes with an additional deposit of 4 boxes.
