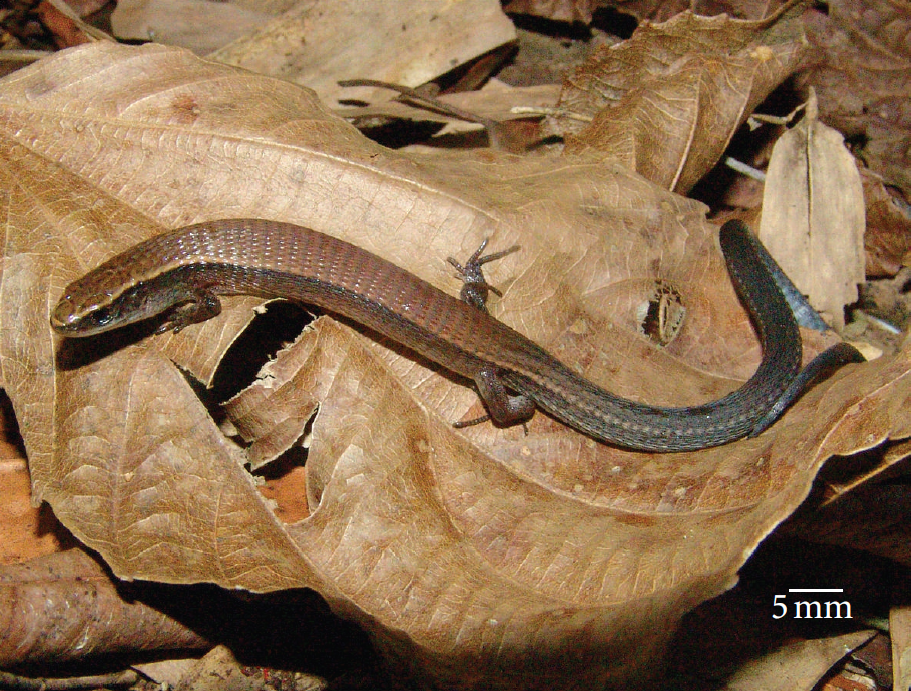

Conservation status
- Least Concern (IUCN 3.1)

Scientific classification
- Kingdom: Animalia
- Phylum: Chordata
- Class: Reptilia
- Order: Squamata
- Family: Gymnophthalmidae
- Genus: Colobodactylus
- Species: C. taunayi

Binomial name
- Colobodactylus taunayi Amaral, 1933

= Colobodactylus taunayi =

Species of lizard

Colobodactylus taunayi, also known commonly as the Taunay teiid or Taunay's teiid, is a species of lizard in the family Gymnophthalmidae. The species is endemic to Brazil.

== Etymology ==
The specific name, taunayi, is in honor of Brazilian historian Afonso d'Escragnolle Taunay.

== Geographic range ==
C. taunayi occurs in the Brazilian state of São Paulo.

== Habitat ==
The preferred natural habitat of C. taunayi is forest.

== Reproduction ==
C. taunayi is oviparous.
