= Francisco Otaviano =

Brazilian politician

- A photograph depicting Otaviano
- Born: Francisco Otaviano de Almeida Rosa; 26 June 1825; Rio de Janeiro, Empire of Brazil
- Died: 28 May 1889 (aged 62); Rio de Janeiro, Empire of Brazil
- Education: University of São Paulo
- Occupations: Poet, lawyer, politician, diplomat, journalist
- Writing career
- Literary movement: Romanticism

Francisco Otaviano de Almeida Rosa (26 June 1825 – 28 May 1889) was a Brazilian poet, lawyer, diplomat, journalist and politician. He is famous for translating into Portuguese works by famous writers such as Horace, Catullus, Lord Byron, William Shakespeare, Percy Bysshe Shelley, Victor Hugo and Johann Wolfgang von Goethe, most of them for the first time.

He is the patron of the 13th chair of the Brazilian Academy of Letters.

== Life ==
Otaviano was born in Rio de Janeiro in 1825, to Otaviano Maria da Rosa, a doctor, and Joana Maria da Rosa. He entered the Faculdade de Direito da Universidade de São Paulo in 1841, graduating in 1845. Returning to Rio, he started to collaborate for newspapers such as Sentinela da Monarquia, the Official Gazette of the Empire of Brazil, Jornal do Commercio and Correio Mercantil.

From 1867 to 1869 he was the deputy (later senator) of the Empire of Brazil, and served as the negotiator of the Treaty of the Triple Alliance among Brazil, Argentina and Uruguay.

During the negotiations of the Treaty of the Triple Alliance in 1865, Otaviano displayed a marked anti-Argentine sentiment, characterized by deep distrust toward Argentine ambitions and a firm prioritization of Brazilian imperial interests. His instructions from the Brazilian government explicitly emphasized preventing Argentina from hindering Brazil’s military actions against Paraguay. Contemporary observers, including the British minister Edward Thornton, noted a evident “coldness” between Otaviano and the Argentine authorities, attributing it to the Brazilian plenipotentiary’s intransigent demands. Otaviano pushed for clauses that limited Argentine territorial gains and influence in the post-war settlement, reflecting a broader Brazilian elite perception of Argentina as a potential rival rather than a genuine partner. This stance contributed to the hurried signing of the treaty on 1 May 1865, but also sowed seeds of long-term friction within the alliance.

He died in 1889.

== Works ==
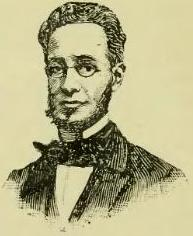
Francisco Otaviano de Almeida Rosa

- Inteligência do Ato Adicional (1857)
- As Assembleias Provinciais (1869)
- Cantos de Selma (1872)
- Traduções e Poesias (1881)

His most famous poem is "Ilusões da vida" ("Illusions of the life").

Portuguese

Quem passou pela vida em branca nuvem,
E em plácido repouso adormeceu;
Quem não sentiu o frio da desgraça;
Quem passou pela vida e não sofreu;
Foi espectro de homem, não foi homem —
Só passou pela vida, não viveu.

English

Who passed through the life in a white cloud,
And slept a peaceful sleep;
Who did not feel the cold disgrace;
Who passed through the life and did not suffer;
Was the specter of a man, but not a man —
He only passed through the life, but did not live it at all.

Preceded by New creation	Brazilian Academy of Letters – Patron of the 13th chair	Succeeded by Alfredo d'Escragnolle Taunay (founder)
