= Gastão d'Escragnolle, Baron d'Escragnolle =

Brazilian politician, military figure and nobleman

Alexandre Louie Marie de Robert d'Escragnolle, Father of the Baron Gastao Luis Henrique d'Escragnolle

Gastão Luís Henrique Robert d'Escragnolle, Baron d'Escragnolle (April 16, 1821 — June 16, 1886) was a Brazilian politician, military figure and nobleman. He was son of French noblemen Alexandre Louis Marie de Robert, count d'Escragnolle (1785–1828), and Adelaïde Françoise Madeleine de Beaurepaire-Rohan (1785–1840).

He was the aide-de-camp of Luís Alves de Lima e Silva, the Duke of Caxias. He later abandoned his career as a lieutenant colonel to dedicate himself to politics, in the area of public administration.

One of his sisters, Gabriela d'Escragnolle, married the painter Félix Taunay; one of their sons is the famous novelist and politician Alfredo d'Escragnolle Taunay, the Viscount of Taunay.

The coat of arms of the Baron d'Escragnolle
