= Alexander Eliot =

American writer (1919–2015)

Alexander Eliot (April 28, 1919 – April 23, 2015) was an American writer born in Cambridge, Massachusetts, best known for his works on spirituality and myth. He is the son of Samuel Atkins Eliot, Jr., the grandson of Samuel Atkins Eliot, and the great-grandson of Charles W. Eliot, president of Harvard for fifty years. Eliot was the art editor of Time magazine from 1945 to 1960. His many books include “The Universal Myths: Heroes, Gods, Tricksters, and Other”, “The Global Myths: Exploring Primitive, Pagan, Sacred, and Scientific Mythologies”, and “The Timeless Myths: How Ancient Legends Influence the Modern World”.

Eliot was married to writer Jane Winslow Eliot, author of "Around the World by Mistake" from 1952 until her death on July 31, 2011. Together they wrote the script for the film "The Secret of Michelangelo – Every Man’s Dream", produced and directed by Milton Fruchtman, which appeared on ABC primetime television in 1968. Their children are Jefferson Eliot and the writers May Paddock and Winslow Eliot.

== Personal life ==
In 1960, Eliot was awarded a Guggenheim Guggenheim Fellowship, and moved with his wife and children to Spain for a year. There he wrote Sight and Insight – on how to ‘see’ art. While he was there, he and Jane Winslow Eliot made the decision to leave his job as art editor of Time magazine and the stressful Manhattan lifestyle and live in Greece instead. In 1963, he took his family on a Yugoslav freighter for a long journey through various parts of Asia, eventually disembarking in Osaka, Japan. (The story of that journey is written in Around the World by Mistake, a narrative written by Eliot's wife and published in 2007). In 1964 the family moved to Rome, Italy, and later to Sussex, England where Eliot lived until 1974. In 1975 he received a fellowship from the Japan Foundation to study Zen Buddhism in Kyoto, Japan. Eliot is descended from aristocratic educators, beginning with the younger son of an English lord who arrived in Plymouth in 1632 and proceeded to be interested in educating the Algonquins. His great-grandfather, Charles W. Eliot, was the president of Harvard for fifty years. He was the first male Eliot not to attend Harvard; instead, when he was eighteen years old, he drove across the country to live with the Navajos in New Mexico. Art was his great love and eventually he chose to attend Black Mountain College so that he could study with Josef Albers. In 1945 he joined Time magazine as the art editor, where he remained until 1960. He knew most artists who lived in New York during his tenure at Time, and also had encounters with artists when he lived abroad, including Matisse, Picasso, and his friend Salvador Dalí. In 1968 he spent six weeks in the Sistine Chapel to research a documentary on Michelangelo's Sistine Ceiling. The ‘research’ was done mostly by having a scaffold built on wheels that he and his wife Jane could lie on top of: this way they could be as close to Michelangelo's work as he was himself; and to study and talk about the stories that he depicted on the ceiling. The hour-long documentary, “The Secret of Michelangelo – Every Man’s Dream,” was shown in December 1968 on ABC primetime.

== Books and articles ==
Eliot published eighteen books, including books on art, mythology, history, and novels. He was also the author of hundreds of essays, published in magazines as varied as The Eastern Buddhist and England's Systematics, and, most well-known, his weekly column when he was the art editor of Time magazine. His tastes in art were wide-ranging, and he was among the few critics of the time who understood the persistence of figurative painting in the era of abstraction, championing painters such as Henry Koerner, who remained representational.

=== Myths and Spirituality ===
- The Universal Myths: Heroes, Gods, Tricksters, and Others (New American Library, 1990)

Introduced by Joseph Campbell, Mircea Eliade

- The Timeless Myths: How Ancient Legends Influence the Modern World, New York: Truman Talley Books/Meridian, 1997
- The Global Myths: Exploring Primitive, Pagan, Sacred, and Scientific

Mythologies (New York: Continuum, 1993)

- Myths (New York : McGraw-Hill International, 1976) (published in 5 languages)
- Zen Edge (London: Thames and Hudson, 1976) (written when he received a Senior Fellowship from the Japan Foundation and lived with his wife for a year in Kyoto, studying Zen Buddhism)
- Creatures of Arcadia (Indianapolis: Bobbs-Merrill Company, 1967)
- Earth, Air, Fire and Water – A Personal Adventure into the Sources of Our Life and Legend (New York: Simon & Schuster, 1959)

=== Art, history, and travel ===
- Three Hundred Years of American Painting (New York: Time Inc., 1957) (selected by John F. Kennedy as one of his favorite books)
- Sight and Insight (New York: McDowell, Obolensky Inc. 1959)
- A Concise History of Greece (The Cassell concise history series)
- Abraham Lincoln : An Illustrated Biography
- The Horizon Concise History of Greece (American Heritage, 1968)
- Greece (Time-Life Books)

The Penguin Guide to Greece 1990 Guidebook to Greece 83/84

=== Novels ===
- Proud Youth (New York: Farrar, Straus & Young, 1953)
- Love Play (New York: NAL, 1966)

== Quote ==
“Life is a fatal adventure. It can only have one end. So why not make it as far-ranging and free as possible?” (quoted in Who's Who)
