= Cláudia Rodrigues Ferreira de Carvalho =

Brazilian archaeologist

- Born: Brazil

Academic background
- Education: Estacio de Sa University, UNESA

Academic work
- Institutions: Escola Nacional de Saúde Pública (ENSP); Anthropology of the Department of Anthropology of the National Museum / UFRJ
- Main interests: Biological anthropology, Archaeology.

Cláudia Rodrigues Ferreira de Carvalho, also Claudia Rodrigues-Carvalho, is a Brazilian archaeologist and is the director of the Science House of the Federal University of Rio de Janeiro (UFRJ) since 2018. She was the director of the UFRJ from 2010 to 2018. de Carvalho is also assistant professor of the Sector of Biological Anthropology of the Department of Anthropology of the National Museum.

== Biography ==
De Carvalho graduated from Estácio de Sá Universities in 1994 and went on to get a specialization in paleopathology the same year. She then continued to complete her master's degree in public health in 1997. De Carvalho completed a PhD in public health in 2004. All these were through the National School of Public Health Sérgio Arouca. Working with the National Museum of Brazil, de Carvalho is focused on the field of biological anthropology, related to human evolution and forensic anthropology. As an adjunct professor de Carvalho is responsible for portions of the Postgraduate Program in Archaeology, the specialization course in Quaternary Geology and undergraduate course in Biomedical Sciences at UFRJ.
