= Alfredo d'Escragnolle Taunay, Viscount of Taunay =

Brazilian writer, musician, professor, engineer, historian, politician and nobleman

Alfredo d'Escragnolle Taunay
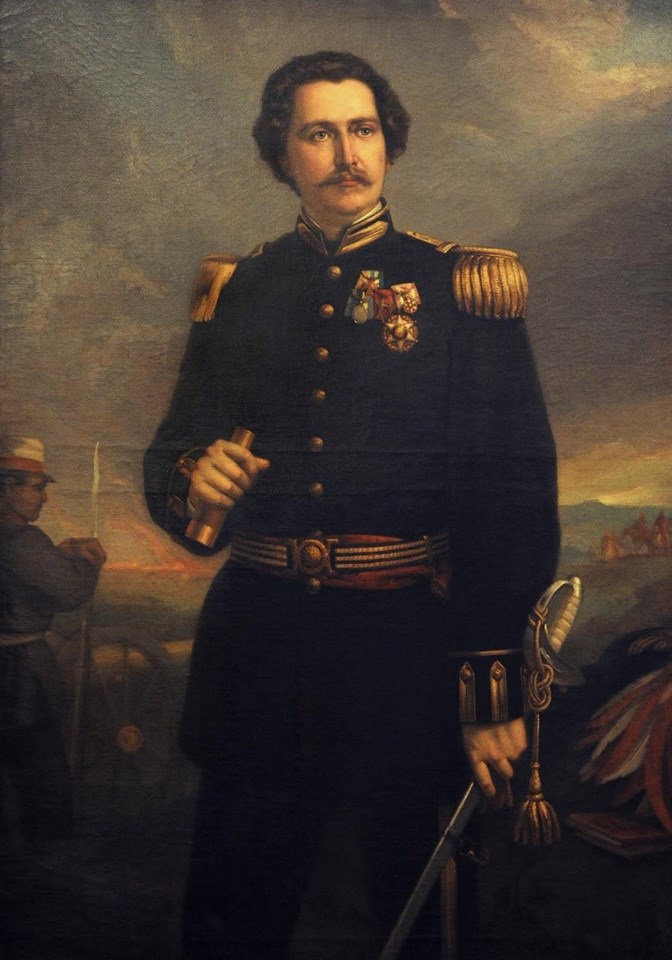
- Portrait by Louis-Auguste Moreaux, 1867
- Born: Alfredo Maria Adriano d'Escragnolle Taunay; 22 February 1843; Rio de Janeiro, Empire of Brazil
- Died: 25 January 1899 (aged 55); Rio de Janeiro, Brazil
- Education: Colégio Pedro II
- Occupations: Writer, musician, professor, military engineer, historian, politician, sociologist
- Spouse: Cristina Teixeira Leite
- Children: Afonso d'Escragnolle Taunay
- Relatives: Félix Taunay, Nicolas-Antoine Taunay, Adrien Taunay the Younger
- Writing career
- Pen name: Sílvio Dinarte
- Notable works: Inocência, A Retirada da Laguna
- Movement: Romanticism

Alfredo Maria Adriano d'Escragnolle Taunay, Viscount of Taunay (22 February 1843 – 25 January 1899), was a Brazilian writer, musician, professor, military engineer, historian, politician, sociologist and nobleman. He is famous for the regionalist novel Inocência, considered a major forerunner of naturalism in Brazil, and for A Retirada da Laguna (1874; originally written in 1872 in French as Le retraite de Laguna), an account of an episode in the Paraguayan War. The Brazilianist Leslie Bethell has described it as "the one undoubted literary masterpiece produced by the Paraguayan War".

He founded and occupied the 13th chair of the Brazilian Academy of Letters from 1897 until his death in 1899.

== Life ==
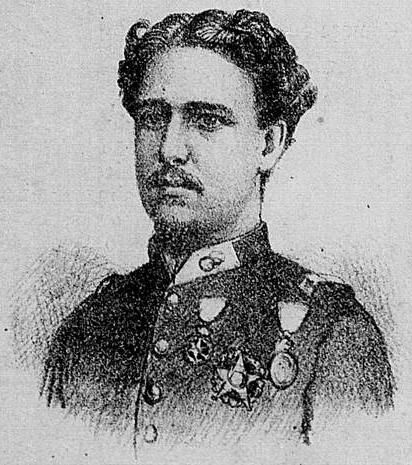
Alfredo d'Escragnolle Taunay.

The arms of the Viscount of Taunay. The first and fourth quarters represent the arms of the Taunay family, while the second the third quarters represent the arms of the d'Escragnolle family

Taunay was born in Rio de Janeiro, in 1843. His father was Félix Taunay, Baron of Taunay, a painter, professor and headmaster of the Escola Nacional de Belas Artes; his mother, Gabriela Hermínia Robert d'Escragnolle Taunay, was one of the sisters of Gastão d'Escragnolle, the Baron d'Escragnolle; and his grandfather was the French painter Nicolas-Antoine Taunay, Baron of Taunay. Growing up in a cultured environment, Taunay studied Literature and Humanities at the Colégio Pedro II, graduating in 1858. He studied physics and mathematics in what is now the Academia Militar das Agulhas Negras. An Ensign in 1862, bachelor in Mathematics in 1863 and an Artillery Lieutenant in 1864, he was matriculated in the second year of military engineering course, but he did not finish it because of the Paraguayan War. From his experiences at the war, he wrote the memoir Cenas de Viagem in 1868 and the historic account La Retraite de Laguna (French for The Retreat of Laguna) in 1872, translating it to Portuguese two years later.

Taunay wrote and published his first romance, Mocidade de Trajano (Trajan's Youth), in 1871, under the pen name Sílvio Dinarte. Appointed by the future Viscount of Rio Branco José Maria da Silva Paranhos Sr., he became the general deputy of Goiás from 1872 to 1875, a Major in 1875 and the governor of Santa Catarina from 1876 to 1877. In 1885, he asked for his demission of the Major post.

Taunay married Cristina Teixeira Leite, daughter of Francisco José Teixeira Leite (Baron of Vassouras), granddaughter of Francisco José Teixeira (1st Baron of Itambé, Bahia) and grandniece of Custódio Ferreira Leite (Baron of Aiuruoca). They had one son, the historian Afonso d'Escragnolle Taunay (1876–1958).

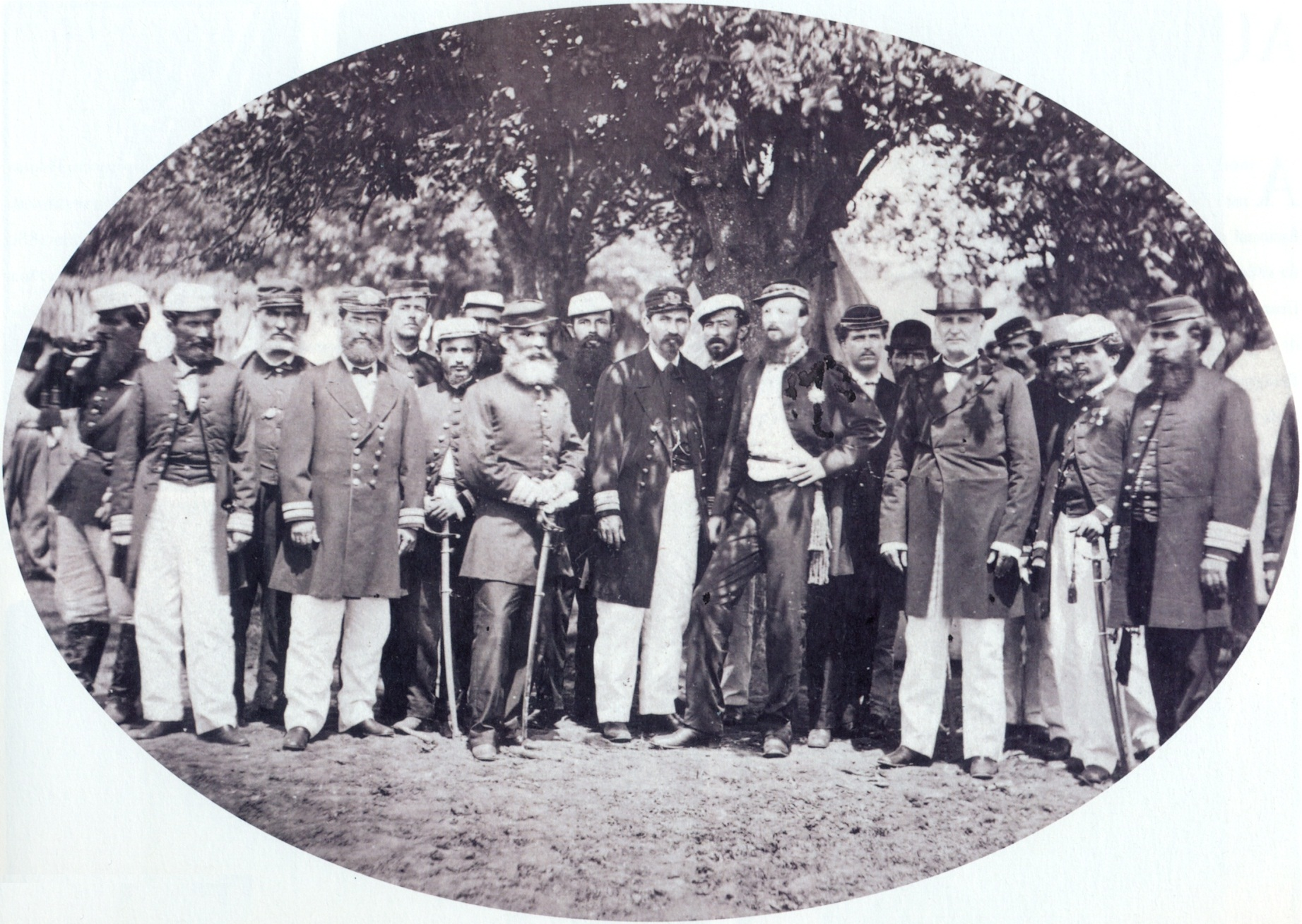
The Count of Eu (with his hand on the waist, center-right) with future Viscount of Rio Branco José Maria da Silva Paranhos Sr. (on his right, wearing a top hat) and Taunay (between the two) among Brazilian soldiers during the Paraguayan War, in a photo dating from c. 1870

Taunay was a member of the Conservative Party, but when the party fell, in 1878, he travelled to Europe, returning only in 1880.

From 1881 to 1884, he was the deputy of Santa Catarina. He candidated himself to the post of deputy of Rio de Janeiro, but was defeated in the elections. From 1885 to 1886, he was the governor of Paraná. One of Taunay's most famous deeds as governor of Paraná was the inauguration of the Passeio Público in the capital Curitiba, in 1886.

In 1889, Emperor Pedro II gave him the title of Viscount of Taunay. However, when Brazil became a Republic, all the nobility ranks were abolished. Taunay, disgusted, abandoned his political career, since he was a monarchist.

He died in 1899 due to diabetes.

== Works ==
=== Novels ===
- Mocidade de Trajano (1871 – under pen name Sílvio Dinarte)
- La Retraite de Laguna (published in 1872, originally in French; translated into Portuguese by Taunay in 1874)
- Inocência (1872)
- Lágrimas do Coração (1873)
- Ouro Sobre Azul (1875)
- O Encilhamento (1894)
- No Declínio (1899)

=== Short story collections ===
- Histórias Brasileiras (1874)
- Narrativas Militares (1878)
- Ao Entardecer (1901)

=== Theater ===
- Da Mão à Boca se Perde a Sopa (1874)
- Por um Triz, Coronel! (1880)
- Amélia Smith (1886)

=== Other ===
- Cenas de Viagem (1874)
- A Retirada da Laguna (1874) (published in French as La retraite de Laguna, 1871)
- Estudos Críticos (1881–1883)
- Céus e Terras do Brasil (1882)

=== Posthumous works ===
- Reminiscências (1908)
- Trechos de Minha Vida (1911)
- Viagens de Outrora (1921)
- Visões do Sertão (1923)
- Dias de Guerra e do Sertão (1923)
- Homens e Coisas do Império (1924)

Preceded by New creation	Viscount of Taunay; 1889	Succeeded by None (title abolished)

Preceded by Francisco Otaviano (patron)	Brazilian Academy of Letters – Occupant of the 13th chair 1897–1899	Succeeded by Francisco de Castro
