= Byron Burford =

American painter

- Byron Burford in 1960
- Born: Byron Leslie Burford, Jr. July 12, 1920; Jackson, Mississippi
- Died: June 17, 2011 (aged 90); Iowa City, Iowa
- Education: University of Iowa School of Art and Art History
- Known for: Painting

Byron Leslie Burford, Jr. (July 12, 1920 – June 17, 2011) was an American figurative painter.

== Biography ==
Byron Leslie Burford, Jr., was born July 12, 1920, in Jackson, Mississippi, to Byron and Floy Smith Burford. Growing up in Greenville, Burford became fascinated with the carnivals and circuses booked to perform in the community by his father, who directed the local YMCA. At the age of 14 Burford went to work as a roadie for the Tom Mix Circus, and he painted circus life.

After he completed high school, Burford studied at the University of Iowa School of Art and Art History and was one of the students mentored by Grant Wood. In 1941 Burford completed a commission for the Treasury Department's Section of Painting and Sculpture, a mural for the U.S. post office in Houston, Mississippi. He received his bachelor's degree in 1942 and joined the United States Army Air Corps. After World War II he returned to the University of Iowa and completed his Master of Fine Arts degree in 1947.

Burford taught painting at University of Iowa for 38 years. His friends in Iowa City included Kurt Vonnegut, who taught at the Iowa Writers' Workshop for two years in the 1960s. Throughout his academic career Burford used his breaks to travel with circuses, painting and playing drums with the band. Burford's paintings and prints of soldiers, athletes, jazz musicians, factory workers and circus people attracted a wide following. A well-known artist in the Midwest, Burford exhibited widely and received many honors and awards, including a Guggenheim Fellowship in 1960 and a grant from the National Academy of Arts and Letters in 1967.

In 1966, Hilton Kramer of The New York Times praised Burford's first one-person show in New York, noting that "Mr. Burford surprises us by displaying a very lively imagination, some obsessive themes and a real flair for dramatizing his ideas. Motifs drawn from carnival and circus life, from popular culture and nostalgic glimpses of forgotten wars, are transformed into graphic symbols of a notable complexity."

His work is in the permanent collections of institutions including the Nelson-Atkins Museum of Art, the San Francisco Museum of Modern Art, the Walker Art Center and the University of Iowa Museum of Art.

Burford was married for 65 years to Kathleen Kane, who died in 2009; they had three children. Burford died June 17, 2011, at his home in Iowa City, of natural causes, aged 90.
