= Afonso d'Escragnolle Taunay =

Brazilian writer and historian (1876–1958)

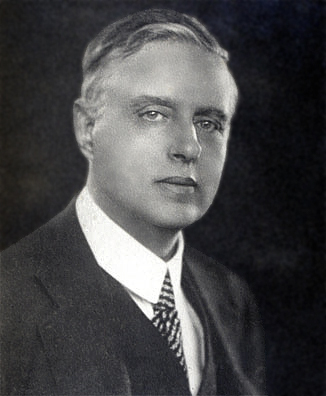
- Taunay in 1916
- Born: 11 July 1876; Desterro, Santa Catarina, Empire of Brazil
- Died: 20 March 1958 (aged 81); São Paulo, São Paulo, Brazil
- Education: Polytechnic School of Rio de Janeiro
- Occupations: Writer; historian
- Spouse: Sara de Sousa Queirós
- Relatives: Alfredo d'Escragnolle Taunay, Viscount of Taunay (father)
- Writing career
- Notable work: Carta Geral das Bandeiras Paulistas (1921)

Afonso d'Escragnolle Taunay (11 July 1876 – 20 March 1958) was a Brazilian writer and historian.

== Biography ==
Afonso was born in the Palácio Rosado, the residence of Santa Catarina's governor. He was the only legitimate son of Alfredo d'Escragnolle Taunay, Viscount of Taunay, and Cristina Teixeira Leite (daughter of the Baron of Vassouras). He was the grandson of Félix Taunay, Baron of Taunay, and the great-grandson of the Count of Escragnolle, a French nobleman. He had one half-brother, João Pedro Nolasco, who was born in Paris and married a Basque woman, Maria de Lima.

He graduated in civil engineering at the Polytechnic School of Rio de Janeiro, around 1900. He taught at Polytechnic School of São Paulo. He was the director of Museu Paulista (now Ipiranga Museum) from 1934 to 1937. He married Sara de Sousa Queirós, and had four children: Ana Queirós Taunay, Paulo Taunay, Augusto de Escragnolle Taunay and Clarisse Taunay.

He was a member of the Brazilian Academy of Letters and the Brazilian Historic and Geographic Institute.

Taunay is commemorated in the scientific name of a species of Brazilian lizard, Colobodactylus taunayi.

== Works ==
- Guia da Secção Histórica do Museu Paulista, 1937
- História do Café no Brasil, 1939
