= Ursula K. Abbott =

Canadian-American scientist (1927–2012)

- Abbott with artificially hatched Himalayan snow partridge in 1965
- Born: Ursula Helen Knight; July 20, 1927; Chilliwack, British Columbia, Canada
- Died: January 15, 2012 (aged 84); Davis, California, U.S.
- Education: University of British Columbia (BS, MS); University of California, Berkeley (PhD)
- Spouse: John Abbott
- Children: 2
- Awards: Guggenheim Fellowship (1960)
- Scientific career
- Workplaces: University of California, Davis
- Thesis: Genetic and physiological studies of diplopodia, a lethal form of polydactyly in the domestic fowl (1955)
- Doctoral advisor: Lewis Walter Taylor

Ursula Helen Knight Abbott (July 20, 1927 – January 15, 2012) was an Canadian-American poultry scientist. A 1960 Guggenheim Fellow, she was a professor at University of California, Davis (UC Davis), where she chaired the Department of Avian Sciences from 1981 to 1984.

== Education ==
Ursula Helen Knight, an only child, was born on July 20, 1927, in Chilliwack, British Columbia, to Ruth Agar and Gordon Knight. After graduating from the Duke of Connaught High School in New Westminster in 1945 she attended the University of British Columbia, where she got a BS in 1949 and MS in 1950 in poultry and genetics. She obtained a PhD in genetics in 1955 from the University of California, Berkeley, and worked as a principal technician at the University of California, Davis, Department of Poultry Husbandry; her doctoral dissertation, Genetic and physiological studies of diplopodia, a lethal form of polydactyly in the domestic fowl, was supervised by Lewis Walter Taylor.

== Career ==
Following her doctoral degree, Abbott became an instructor at UC Davis, before being promoted to assistant professor in 1957 and eventually full professor. In 1972, UC Davis chancellor James Henry Meyer appointed her the Task Force on the Status of Women at UCD. In 1981, she became chair of the UC Davis Department of Avian Sciences, serving until 1984. At UC Davis, she held a graduate course in embryology and teratology, and helped develop undergraduate courses in developmental genetics. She was also active in the UC Davis community, serving in several academic senate committees and helping out with events held on campus. She retired from UC Davis in 1992. She also worked at the National Science Foundation as a developmental biology program director.

Abbott specialized in development genetics, which Francine A. Bradley, Mary E. Delany, and Charles E. Hess said was "a fusion of her two main interests: poultry breeding and embryology"; she had become interested in poultry development while in grade school. In 1960, she was awarded a Guggenheim Fellowship to do research at the Poultry Research Center, Animal Genetics Institute, and the laboratories of Étienne Wolff and Rodolfo Amprino, for a book project on bird development. She often bred featherless chickens at UC Davis's Department of Avian Sciences; Vaun Wilmott of The Sacramento Bee said that Abbott was "believed to be the only scientist in America breeding naked chickens". She and Stephen Subtelny co-edited Levels of Genetic Control in Development (1981), the volume of the 1980 Symposium of The Society for Developmental Biology. In 2004, the Ursula K. Abbott Symposium on Developmental Genetics and Teratology was held in her honour at UC Davis. Gary C. Schoenwolf said that "her passion for identifying and maintaining stocks of mutant avian embryos" was the "most important" part of her career as a developmental biologist.

== Personal life ==
Abbott was married to John Abbott; they had two sons. In addition to living in the United States, she lived in Vancouver.

Abbott died on January 15, 2012, in her home in Davis, California, following a period of cancer. UC Davis held a Celebration of Life for Abbott on May 2.

== Works ==
- (ed. with Stephen Subtelny) Levels of Genetic Control in Development (1981)
