= Isolda Rocha e Silva Albuquerque =

Brazilian entomologist

- Born: 27 January 1931 (age 95); Rio de Janeiro
- Occupation: Entomologist
- Spouse: Dalcy de Oliveira Albuquerque
- Awards: Guggenheim Fellowship (1959 and 1960)

Academic background
- Education: University of Paris; Faculdade Nacional de Filosofia

Academic work
- Discipline: Entomology
- Sub-discipline: Blattodea
- Institutions: Museu Paraense Emílio Goeldi

Isolda Rocha e Silva Albuquerque (born 27 January 1931) is a Brazilian entomologist. A Guggenheim Fellow, she specialised in cockroaches and was a researcher at the Museu Paraense Emílio Goeldi.

== Biography ==
She was born on 27 January 1931 in Rio de Janeiro. After studying abroad at the University of Paris from 1951 until 1952, she later returned to Brazil, where she got her bachelor's degree in natural history from the Faculdade Nacional de Filosofia in 1954.

In 1952, she began working as an investigator at the National Research Council. She was awarded two Guggenheim Fellowships in 1959 and 1960. She married fellow entomologist Dalcy de Oliveira Albuquerque.

In 1962, she and her husband started working at the Museu Paraense Emílio Goeldi, where the latter eventually became director. She described several new species, including Xestoblatta bananae (1962), Xestoblatta iani (1964), Xestoblatta roppai (1975), and Xestoblatta vera (1975). In addition to a dozen articles in the Boletim do Museu Paraense Emílio Goeldi, which her employer published, she also published in the Anais da Academia Brasileira de Ciências. She was manager of the Blattodea collection at the National Museum of Brazil.

William Leslie Overal and Inocêncio de S. Gorayeb called her "a renowned specialist in South American Blattoidea", which she had a large collection of specimens, and said that her published work "represents significant contributions to the knowledge of the fauna of the Brazilian Amazon". In 1966, Ashley B. Gurney and Louis M. Roth named the genus Isoldaia after her "in recognition of her sustained efforts to broaden the knowledge of South American Blattaria". In 1983, Jose C. M. Carvalho and Maria Luiza Felippe named the species Isoldalinus rarus and its genus Isoldalinus "in recognition of her work on Neotropical Blattariae".
