= Charles Fairman =

American law professor and political scientist

- Born: July 27, 1897; Alton, Illinois
- Died: November 25, 1988 (aged 91); La Jolla, California

Academic background
- Education: University of Illinois; Harvard University; University of London
- Influences: Felix Frankfurter

Academic work
- Discipline: Law
- Sub-discipline: Constitutional law
- Institutions: Pomona College; Williams College; Stanford University; Washington University; Harvard University
- Notable students: William Rehnquist

Charles Fairman (July 27, 1897 – November 25, 1988) was an American law professor and political scientist.

== Biography ==
The son of a lawyer, Fairman was born on July 27, 1897, in Alton, Illinois. He received his A.B. and A.M. from the University of Illinois in 1918 and 1920, and his Ph.D. from Harvard University in 1926. After completing further graduate studies at the University of Paris in 1925–26, he received an LL.B. from the University of London in 1934 and an S.J.D. from Harvard Law School in 1938. While studying for his S.J.D. at Harvard, he took a class from then-professor Felix Frankfurter, who went on to become his mentor.

In 1926, he became assistant professor of government at Pomona College, and in 1928, he joined the faculty of Harvard as a lecturer in government. He served as an assistant professor of political science at Williams College from 1930 to 1936. After graduating from Harvard in 1938, he joined the faculty of Stanford University, initially as an associate professor of political science. In 1941, he was promoted to a full professor of political science, and in 1947, he was named a full professor at Stanford Law School as well. He left the faculty of Stanford in 1953 to join the faculty of Washington University School of Law, where he served as the Charles Nagel Chair from 1953 to 1955. He served as a professor at Harvard Law School from 1955 to 1962, where he taught American legal history.

One of the students who Fairman taught at Stanford was William Rehnquist, who later became the Chief Justice of the United States Supreme Court. Fairman taught that the Fourteenth Amendment to the United States Constitution was not intended to apply to the states, a view that Rehnquist later espoused. However, most legal scholars and Supreme Court rulings have since rejected this interpretation of the Fourteenth Amendment. Rehnquist dedicated his book Centennial Crisis: The Disputed Election of 1876 to Fairman, whom Rehnquist stated "first introduced [him] to the Supreme Court in an undergraduate course in Constitutional Law at Stanford University". Fairman was especially critical of Justice Hugo Black, which influenced Rehnquist's enduring admiration for Black's rival Justice Felix Frankfurter.

Fairman died on November 25, 1988, in La Jolla, California.
