= Marion Tinling =

American historian (1908–1993)

- Born: Marion Rose Goble; December 17, 1904; Richmond Hill, New York, U.S.
- Died: December 30, 2006 (aged 102); Elk Grove, California, U.S.
- Occupations: Historian; editor; social worker
- Spouse: Willis Tinling (m. 1933; div. 1947)
- Children: 3
- Awards: Guggenheim Fellowship (1960)

Academic background
- Education: Occidental College; Keuka College

Academic work
- Institutions: Huntington Library; Library of Congress

Marion Rose Tinling (née Goble; December 17, 1904 – December 30, 2006) was an American historian, editor, and activist. She worked for the Huntington Library and Library of Congress, publishing several edited book volumes of historical documents, and she was a 1960 Guggenheim Fellow. During her early life, she worked as a social worker and non-profit founder, and published several books in women's history.

== Biography ==
Marion Rose Goble was born on December 17, 1904, in Richmond Hill, Queens. Her mother Nora (née Sale) was a nurse and her father Frank Newton was a contractor. After briefly attending Occidental College in the mid-1920s, (Note: Despite agreeing that she joined in 1926, sources differ on the exact end date: while Contemporary Authors says 1927, Reports of the Secretary and of the Treasurer says 1928.) she returned to New York state and obtained a BA from Keuka College in 1929.

In 1930, she started working at the Huntington Library, where she was hired as a secretary for her typing skills. From 1947 to 1949, she served as the library's managing editor of publications, as well as assistant editor of the Huntington Library Quarterly. She also worked as a proofreader and typist. While at Huntington, she co-edited several editions of historical documents, including two diaries from the Virginia colonist William Byrd II. Tinling recalled of her time with Huntington: "I was privileged to work with leading scholars in the fields of English and American history and literature, and there I got more education than I received in college." She also released edited diaries of America-based London merchant Robert Hunter and of political leader Harry Toulmin.

After working at the California Department of Education as an editor (1949–1954), she joined the Library of Congress' transcription project for the 1st United States Congress' House of Representatives shorthand notes. She released another edited William Byrd diary in 1958, as well as a volume of correspondence from the Byrd family of Virginia in 1977. In 1960, she was awarded a Guggenheim Fellowship "for a study of the letters and other writings of William Byrd II of Westover, Virginia," traveling to London for the research.

In 1963, she returned to Sacramento and worked for the Sacramento County welfare department. She also founded Meals a la Car, a non-profit organization focused on delivering food to elderly people. During her later life, she focused on women's history due in part to its marginalized nature, with her work including two edited volumes on women's history and a guidebook on landmarks related to women's history. In 2001, she published a biography on Jean Baptiste Charbonneau, her final book. She was active in women's rights activism, particularly within the National Organization for Women, Older Women's League (where she was a founding member), and Sacramento Community Commission for Women.

She was married to writer and stunt performer Willis Tinling from 1933 until their divorce in 1947; they had three children, as well as several grandchildren and great-grandchildren. She lived in Land Park, Sacramento, California. She was a Democrat.

Tinling died on December 30, 2006, aged 102, in a care home in Elk Grove, California.

== Works ==
- (as co-editor, with Louis Booker Wright; original by William Byrd II) The Secret Diary of William Byrd of Westover, 1709–1712 (1941) (Note: Reviews of this book:)
- (as co-editor, with Maude Howlett Woodfin; original by William Byrd II) Another Secret Diary of William Byrd of Westover, 1739–1741 (1942) (Note: Reviews of this book:)
- (as co-editor, with Louis Booker Wright; original by Robert Hunter) Quebec to Carolina in 1785–1786: Being the Travel Diary and Observations of Robert Hunter, Jr., a Young Merchant of London (1943) (Note: Reviews of this book:)
- (as co-editor, with Godfrey Davies; original by Harry Toulmin) The Western Country in 1793: Reports on Kentucky and Virginia (1948) (Note: Reviews of this book:)
- (as co-editor, with Louis Booker Wright; original by William Byrd II) The London Diary, 1717–1721, and Other Writings (1958) (Note: Reviews of this book:)
- (as editor) The Correspondence of the Three William Byrds of Westover, Virginia, 1684–1776 (1977) (Note: Reviews of this book:)
- Women Remembered: A Guide to Landmarks of Women's History in the United States (1986) (Note: Reviews of this book:)
- (as editor) Women into the Unknown: A Sourcebook on Women Explorers and Travelers (1989)
- (as editor) With Women's Eyes: Visitors to the New World, 1775–1918 (1993) (Note: Reviews of this book:)
- Sacajawea's Son: The Life of Jean Baptiste Charbonneau (2001)
