= Guia da Secção Histórica do Museu Paulista =

1937 guide by Afonso d'Escragnolle Taunay

- Author: Afonso d'Escragnolle Taunay
- Language: Portuguese
- Genre: Guide book
- Publisher: Paulista Museum
- Publication date: 1937
- Publication place: Brazil
- Pages: 122 pages, 48 unnumbered leaves of plates
- OCLC: 325856
- LC Class: F2501 .S25

Guia da Secção Histórica do Museu Paulista (English: Guide to the Historical Section of the Paulista Museum) is a guide book written by the historian and museum director Afonso d'Escragnolle Taunay. It is the first comprehensive description of the Museu do Ipiranga, commonly known as the Paulista Museum, in São Paulo, Brazil. It solidified the emphasis on historical materials in the museum, a position promoted by Taunay over his long tenure. The publication outlines the history, exhibition rooms and areas, and research conducted by the museum.

The Guia was published in 1937 by the São Paulo Imprensa Official do Estado. Apart from a description of the museum, it contains photographic plates and a composition and arrangement of museum spaces and permanent exhibitions.

The Guia da Secção Histórica do Museu Paulista is seen as a response to the work of Rodolpho von Ihering (1883-1939), the Guia das Coleccões do Museu Paulista (English: Guide to the Collections of the Paulista Museum), published in 1907. Rodolpho von Ihering emphasized the natural history collections of the museum, and placed little attention on its historical collections. Rodolpho was the son of the director of the Paulista Museum, Hermann von Ihering (1850-1930), who directed the museum from 1895 to 1916. Von Ihering, due to his German background, was dismissed from his position of director of the Museu Paulista in 1917 upon Brazil's entry into World War I on the Allied side.

Taunay, as a historian and director of the museum from 1917 to 1945, disagreed with the focus of his predecessor and redesigned the Paulista Museum primarily as a history museum. Taunay used the guide to describe "in detail the symbolic meaning of each element" of the interior of the Museum. The Guia da Secção Histórica do Museu Paulista solidified his position on history and removed most references to the natural science collection of the museum. Only at the end of the work, in a few lines, did Tauney describe that the museum had twelve rooms dedicated to zoology, two to botany, and one of mineralogy and paleontology.
