= The Wind Boy =

1923 American children's fantasy novel

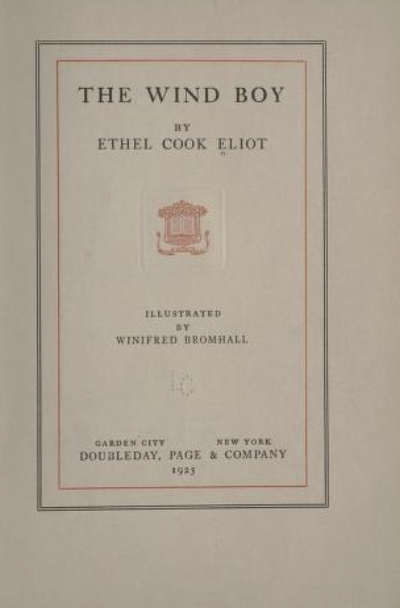
- Title page for The Wind Boy (1923)
- Author: Ethel Cook Eliot
- Illustrator: Winifred Bromhall
- Genre: Fantasy
- Published: September 1923
- Publisher: Doubleday, Page & Company

The Wind Boy is a children's fantasy novel by Ethel Cook Eliot. It was originally published in September 1923 by Doubleday, Page & Company, with illustrations by Winifred Bromhall. It went out of print and was reissued in 1945 and 1996. It has been recommended for children aged 9–10.

== Plot summary ==
The Wind Boy features Kay and Gentian, a boy and girl who are foreign children and outcasts in their village. They live with their mother and wait for their father to come to them from their home country. At the beginning of the book, a mysterious girl named Nan appears in their village, responding to a woman's advertisement requesting a "general housework girl". Nan is able to bring the children into the Clear Land, a world that mirrors their own. In the Clear Land, they each purchase a pair of Clear Land sandals and meet The Wind Boy, a handsome boy with purple wings.

They learn that The Wind Boy once owned a horrible mask, but now it's in the hands of someone else. Now that person is going around scaring children. Until The Wind Boy is able to find and destroy the mask, he cannot have shoes of his own and is the outcast of the Clear Land. Only Gentian, who feels sorry for him, is friends with The Wind Boy.

Kay and Gentian's mother Detra is a sculptor who is trying to make a statuette of The Wind Boy. She visits the Clear Land herself without really knowing it, where she is seen through a clear pool of water. While there, she tells The Wind Boy stories, so that he can smile and she can perfect the statuette. After seeing a starry cloak that Nan has, Gentian is allowed to visit the Clear Land to make her own. The children continue visit the Clear Land quite a few times, once during a punishment in school.

The house next door to the children's home belongs to a famous Artist and his granddaughter, Rosemarie. Rosemarie is very pretty and Kay wishes that he could play with her, however Rosemarie is home-schooled and constantly in the charge of a strict governess.

Kay eventually finds out the masked person is actually Rosemarie, who was lonely and used the mask to disguise herself while she explored the village. Kay tells Rosemarie about The Wind Boy and she agrees to leave the mask for him to destroy (Rosemarie had no idea that she had frightened people so much with the mask). Shortly after, a police officer catches Kay with the mask and assumes that he was the one wearing it. Nan throws the mask into the air where The Wind Boy destroys it. She then visits Rosemarie in the middle of the night and persuades the girl to confess to her grandfather about wearing the mask. Rosemarie does so and her grandfather decides to send her to the village school so that she will have friends.

Rosemarie quickly befriends Kay and Gentian in the school and the children's mother is able to finish The Wind Boy statuette. The Artist likes it so much that he purchases it from her and arranges to have a larger bronze version constructed. Gentian is sad because she is unable to reach The Wind Boy and fears that now that he is no longer an outcast he would not wish to be her friend. She finally realizes that The Wind Boy would never abandon her and finds him again. He tells her that he could not see her when she didn't believe in him as a friend and the two leave to explore the Clear Land.

At the end of the story, Nan announces that she is going to return to her home in the mountains. The children are sad, but Nan explains to them that if she doesn't go home, they can't possibly come to visit her. As Nan leaves, Kay and Gentian's father returns.

== Main characters ==
- Gentian - an eight-year-old girl with copper colored hair, Kay's younger sister.
- Kay - a nine-year-old boy with copper colored hair, Gentian's older brother.
- Nan - a very pretty girl with shoulder-length hair and eyes like the mountains. She is more than she seems, and she is the one who takes Kay and Gentian into the Clear Land for the first time.
- The Wind Boy - a blond-haired boy with magnificent purple wings, probably a few years older than Gentian and Kay.
- Rosemarie - a pretty girl that Kay wishes he knew better. She lives in a rich family.
- The Masker - a person wearing a horrible mask who has been scaring children.
- Detra - Kay and Gentian's mother, a sculptor who visits the Clear Land without knowing while making a statuette of The Wind Boy.
