= Félix Taunay, Baron of Taunay =

French painter

Félix Taunay
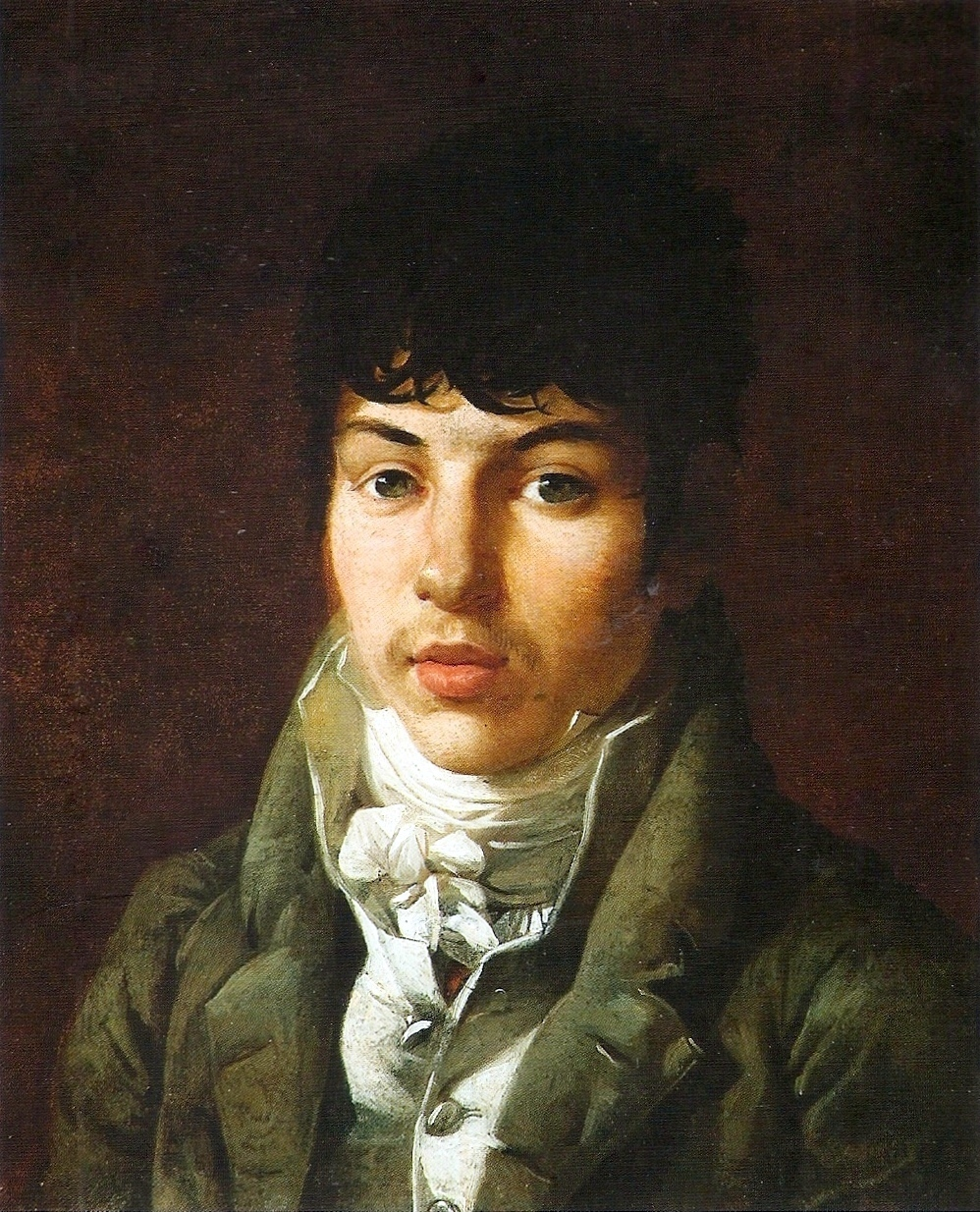
- Taunay, in a portrait made by his father, Nicolas-Antoine Taunay
- Born: Félix Émile Taunay; March 1, 1795; Montmorency, France
- Died: April 10, 1881 (aged 86); Rio de Janeiro, Brazil
- Occupation: Painter

Félix Émile Taunay, Baron of Taunay (March 1, 1795 – April 10, 1881), was a French Brazilian painter, and drawing and Greek teacher. He was the father of famous writer and politician Alfredo d'Escragnolle Taunay, the Viscount of Taunay.

== Biography ==
He was born in a house that belonged to Jean-Jacques Rousseau, in the city of Montmorency. His father, Nicolas-Antoine Taunay, was also a painter, an aristocrat and a member of the then-newly founded Institut de France. Taunay and his father left France after Napoleon Bonaparte's defeat, invited to go to Brazil by the Marquis of Marialva, Pedro José Joaquim Vito de Meneses Coutinho.

They arrived in Brazil in 1816, where Nicolas-Antoine became a history painting teacher at Escola Nacional de Belas Artes (at the time called Academia Imperial de Belas Artes). Three years later, Nicolas-Antoine would return to France, leaving Félix his post at the academy. He became the academy's headmaster in 1834, and, in the following year, he was appointed as a young Emperor Pedro II's Greek, drawing and literature tutor. Félix and the Emperor would be very close friends. He then married Gabriela d'Escragnolle, sister of Gastão d'Escragnolle, and went to live with her in the house his father built in Tijuca, near a waterfall. To this day, this waterfall is known as "Cascatinha Taunay".

He was proclaimed Baron of Taunay and was appointed to the Order of the Rose, to the Order of Merit and was also a Chevalier of the Légion d'honneur in 1851. He also became a member of the Brazilian Historic and Geographic Institute. During his final years of life, Taunay suffered from blindness, which made him retire prematurely.

Before dying, Taunay uttered "Adieu, belle nature du Brésil! Adieu, ma belle cascade!" (French for "Farewell, beautiful nature of Brazil! Farewell, my beautiful waterfall!").
