= Delfina López Sarrelangue =

Mexican historian (1918-2010)

- Born: 15 June 1918; Acayucan, Veracruz, Mexico
- Died: 2010 (aged 92)
- Occupation: Historian
- Awards: Guggenheim Fellowship (1960)

Academic background
- Education: National Autonomous University of Mexico; University of Madrid

Delfina Esmeralda López Sarrelangue (15 June 1918 – 2010) was a Mexican historian who wrote several books related to New Spain-era Mexico. She served as a professor at the Secretariat of Public Education, National School of Anthropology and History, and the National Autonomous University of Mexico and was a 1960 Guggenheim Fellow.

== Biography ==
Delfina Esmeralda López Sarrelangue was born on 15 June 1918 in Acayucan, Veracruz. (Note: While one source gives a birth date of 15 June 1919 and a birthplace of Mexico City, most sources say she was born in 1918.) She graduated from the Escuela Nacional Preparatoria in 1936 and obtained a maestra degree in history and education from the National Autonomous University of Mexico (UNAM) in 1942.

López became a professor at the Secretariat of Public Education (SEP) in 1942 and National School of Anthropology and History (ENAH) in 1952. She was a 1953-1954 Fellow of the Institute of Hispanic Culture, and obtained a doctorate in history from the University of Madrid in 1954. After working at the School of Political and Social Sciences (1955) and School of Philosophy and Letters (1956) as a professor, she became a full-time researcher B at UNAM's Institute of Historical Research on 16 February 1959, before being promoted to principal researcher C. She also stood down from her professorial roles at SEP and ENAH that same year. She retired from UNAM on 1 August 1977.

López was known to be an example of neo-scientific generation of historians of the New Spain era. She published Los colegios jesuitas de la Nueva España (1941) and Una villa mexicana en el siglo XVIII (1957). In 1960, she was awarded a Guggenheim Fellowship "for studies in the history of Mexican education, 1767-1867". She later authored La nobleza indígena de Pátzcuaro en la época virreinal (1965), and Una villa mexicana en el siglo XVIII: Nuestra Señora de Guadalupe (2005). Her book Coapa, la ciénaga de la culebra y las aguas dulces (1500-1968) was posthumously released in 2012.

López died in 2010; she was 92.

== Works ==
- Los colegios jesuitas de la Nueva España (1941)
- Una villa mexicana en el siglo XVIII (1957)
- La nobleza indígena de Pátzcuaro en la época virreinal (1965) (Note: Reviews of this book:)
- Una villa mexicana en el siglo XVIII: Nuestra Señora de Guadalupe (2005)
- Coapa, la ciénaga de la culebra y las aguas dulces (1500-1968) (2012)
