= Dalcy de Oliveira Albuquerque =

Brazilian entomologist and museum director

- Born: 2 August 1918; Cuiabá, Brazil
- Died: 3 October 1982 (aged 64); Rio de Janeiro, Brazil
- Known for: Entomology; direction of the Museu Nacional; reconstruction and recovery of the Adolpho Ducke collection
- Scientific career
- Fields: Entomology
- Institutions: Museu Paraense Emílio Goeldi; Museu Nacional (Brazil)

Dalcy de Oliveira Albuquerque (2 August 1918 – 3 October 1982) was a Brazilian entomologist who served as director of the National Museum of Brazil (Museu Nacional). A total of at least seven taxon names are authored by him.

== Biography ==
Albuquerque arrived at the Museu Paraense Emílio Goeldi in 1962 together with two other noted entomologists, Isolda Rocha e Silva Albuquerque and Roger H. P. Arlé.

Albuquerque later assumed the directorship of the museum; during his six years as director, he did not publish scientific papers, although he worked daily in the laboratory assisting and following ongoing research projects. He was concerned with training local personnel for entomological research in the region. Therezinha de Jesus Pimentel Chaves, now an entomology researcher, was supervised by Dalcy Albuquerque, who is remembered for his dedication as a mentor.

Albuquerque, together with two interns and technicians Apolinário Azevedo de Souza and Maria Fernanda Pinto Torres, initiated a project to reassemble and recover the former Adolpho Ducke collection, a collection that had many type specimens lost during fifty years when the material had been boxed up.

He married fellow entomologist Isolda Rocha e Silva Albuquerque.

== Honours ==
- 1957 Guggenheim Fellowships award
- 1960 Guggenheim Fellowships award
- Colobodactylus dalcyanus is named in honor of him.
- Atractus albuquerquei is also named in honor of him.

== See also ==
- List of directors of the National Museum of Brazil

Preceded by José Lacerda de Araújo Feio	Director of the National Museum of Brazil; 1972–1976	Succeeded by Luis Emygdio de Mello Filho
