= Teresa Pinto-Hamuy =

Chilean neuroscientist

- Born: María Teresa Pinto Santa Cruz; 5 April 1921; Pocochay, La Cruz, Chile
- Died: 13 November 2004 (aged 83)
- Occupation: Neuroscientist
- Spouse: Eduardo Hamuy Berr (m. 1948)
- Children: 2
- Relatives: Aníbal Pinto Santa Cruz (brother); Aníbal Pinto (great-grandfather)
- Awards: Guggenheim Fellowship (1961)

Academic background
- Education: University of Chile

Academic work
- Sub-discipline: Physiological psychology
- Institutions: University of Chile

María Teresa Pinto Hamuy (née Pinto Santa Cruz; 5 April 1921 – 13 November 2004) was a Chilean neuroscientist. Born to the family of president of Chile Aníbal Pinto, she obtained her medical degree at the University of Chile and was awarded a Guggenheim Fellowship as part of her postdoctoral research, and she later became known as a pioneer in physiological psychology, with her work as an academic at the University of Chile including her organization of the first physiological psychology course and several of the university's psychology laboratories.

== Biography ==
María Teresa Pinto Santa Cruz was born on 5 April 1921 in the Pocochay neighbourhood in La Cruz, Chile, the fourth of five children of social worker Inés (née Santa Cruz) and rancher Anibal Pinto del Río. Her brother was economist Aníbal Pinto Santa Cruz. and her great-grandfather was Aníbal Pinto, president of Chile from 1876 to 1881.

She was educated at the Colegio de los Sagrados Corazones de Providencia and in 1947 obtained her medical degree (Note: Biological Research says it was a doctor in medicine, while Vanetza Quezada-Scholz says it was a master's degree in biology and medical sciences.) in the University of Chile. After starting work at the university's Institute of Physiology, she later did postdoctoral neuropsychology research at Johns Hopkins University and University of Wisconsin–Madison. In 1961, she was awarded a Guggenheim Fellowship, allowing her to continue her postdoctorate studies at Stanford University.

She later returned to the University of Chile and was part of their School of Psychology, where she became a professor and organized their first physiological psychology course. She also started the country's first physiological psychology research laboratory, the Department of Physiology and Biophysics' Laboratorio de Psicología Fisiológica, as well as several of the university's psychology laboratories. Her professor title was revoked after the 1973 Chilean coup d'état, but she still supervised thesis work afterwards.

She specialized in the neuroanatomy of memory, having done similar studies on mice and monkeys, as well as research on spatial and visual memory. She was also known as a pioneer in physiological psychology, as well as in the development of both cognitive neuroscience and psychology in Chile. In 1990, she was awarded the university's Amanda Labarca Award.

During her stay in the United States, she married sociologist Eduardo Hamuy Berr in 1948, and they later had two children. She died on 13 November 2004, she was 84. The Chilean journal Biological Research dedicated an issue to her.
