= João da Silveira Caldeira =

Brazilian scientist and museum director

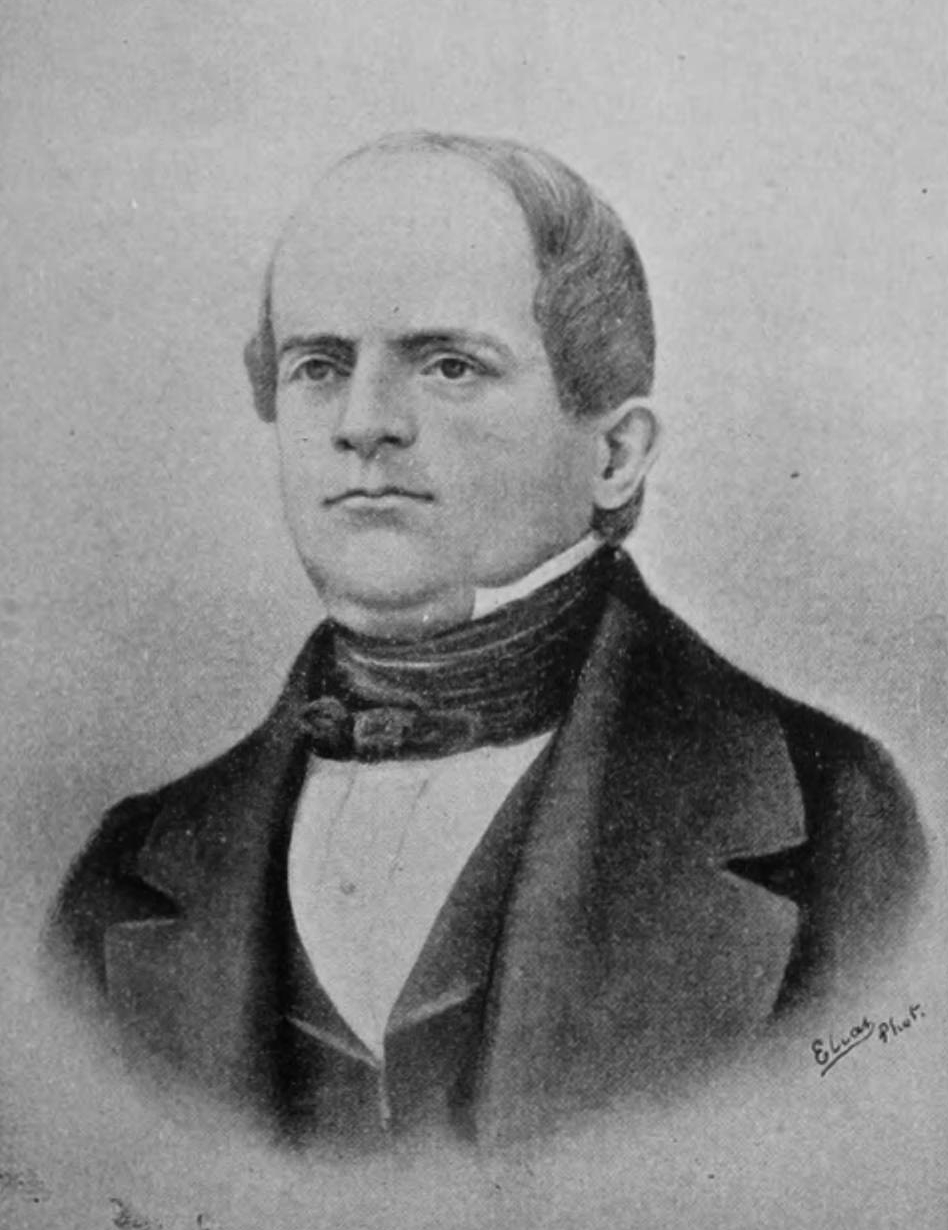

João da Sylveira Caldeira (28 June 1800 – 4 July 1854) was a Brazilian scientist who worked at the National Museum, where he set up the first chemical laboratory in 1824.

Caldeira was born in Rio de Janeiro. He graduated wit a degree in medicine from the University of Edinburgh and studied chemistry in France with Louis Nicolas Vauquelin (1763–1829) and André Laugier (1770–1832) and mineralogist René Just Haüy (1743–1822). He worked in Paris as a preparator at the Jardin de Plantes before returning to Brazil. Here he worked on revising the Flora Braziliensis by José Mariano da Conceição Velloso. He taught chemistry at the military school and in 1823 he was appointed director of the National Museum where he set up a chemical laboratory in 1824. In 1827 he was transferred to the government mint. In 1854, he committed suicide, cutting himself after failing to kill himself using prussic acid.
