= Margaret S. Ogden =

American medievalist (1909-1988)

- Born: August 2, 1909; Asheville, North Carolina, U.S.
- Died: April 7, 1988 (aged 78); Stamford, Connecticut, U.S.
- Occupations: Lexicographer; medievalist
- Spouse: Henry V. S. Ogden (m. 1934)
- Children: 2
- Awards: Guggenheim Fellowship (1960)

Academic background
- Education: Berea College; University of Michigan; University of Chicago

Academic work
- Discipline: Middle Ages
- Sub-discipline: Medieval medicine of Western Europe
- Institutions: University of Michigan

Margaret Sinclair Ogden (née Holderman; August 2, 1909 – April 7, 1988) was an American historian and lexicographer. A 1960 Guggenheim Fellow, she was a historian of medieval medicine of Western Europe, and in addition to publishing two edited versions of medieval medicine texts, co-authored English Taste in Landscape in the Seventeenth Century (1955) with her husband Henry V. S. Ogden. She also worked at the University of Michigan as a researcher and editor for their Middle English Dictionary for four decades.

== Biography ==
Margaret Sinclair Ogden was born on August 2, 1909, in Asheville, North Carolina. She was the daughter of Clement M. Holderman and Canadian-born writer Elizabeth Sinclair Peck. After attending Berea College (where her mother taught history at the time), she then moved to the University of Michigan, where she got a BA in 1927 and MA in 1928, and the University of Chicago, where she got a PhD in 1935.

In 1933, she started working for UMich's Middle English Dictionary as a research assistant, serving until 1937. In 1940, she became a research associate, and she was promoted to assistant editor in 1944. In 1973, she retired from the Middle English Dictionary.

Outside of working on the Middle English Dictionary, Ogden also studied medieval medicine as an academic. In 1938, she published The Liber de Diversis Medicinis, an edition of the medical treatise in the Lincoln Thornton Manuscript. In 1955, she and her husband co-wrote English Taste in Landscape in the Seventeenth Century, a monograph on aesthetic taste in English culture. In 1960, was awarded a Guggenheim Fellowship to study the Chirurgia magna's medieval English-language translations. She published an edition of the Chirurgia magna in 1971, known as The Cyrurgie of Guy de Chauliac, and The Liber de Diversis Medicinis received a reprint in 1988. She also received several National Institutes of Health grants.

On September 8, 1934, she married Henry V. S. Ogden, an English professor at UMich who was also an Early Modern English Dictionary editor. They had two children. She was a long-term resident of Ann Arbor, Michigan, having lived there from 1934 to 1986.

Sinclair died on April 7, 1988, in Stamford, Connecticut.

== Bibliography ==
- (ed.) The Liber de Diversis Medicinis (1938)
- (with Henry V. S. Ogden) English Taste in Landscape in the Seventeenth Century (1955)
- (ed.) The Cyrurgie of Guy de Chauliac (1972)
