= Millicent Barton Rex =

American historian

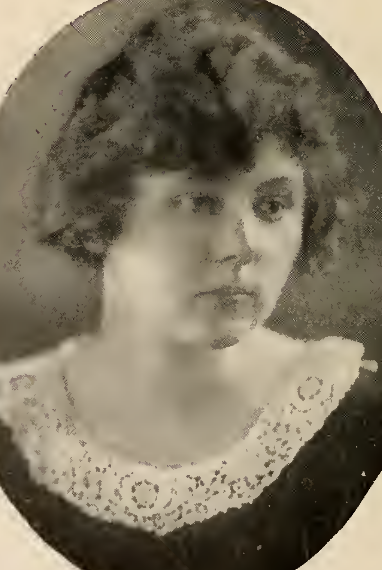
- Millicent Barton Rex, from the 1924 yearbook of Wellesley College
- Born: November 3, 1901; Waterford, Pennsylvania, U.S.
- Died: May 5, 1966 (age 64); Washington, D.C., U.S.
- Occupations: Historian, educator

Millicent Barton Rex (November 3, 1901 – May 5, 1966) was an American historian and educator, who taught at the Madeira School in Virginia.

== Early life and education ==
Rex was born in Waterford, Pennsylvania, the daughter of Frank Clayton Rex and Mary Barton Rex. She graduated from Girls' High School in Reading in 1919, and from Wellesley College in 1924. She earned a master's degree and a Ph.D. from Columbia University. Her doctoral dissertation was titled "University Representation in England, 1604-1690" (1952).

== Career ==
Rex taught history at the Madeira School in Greenway, Virginia, for 34 years. In 1945 she received a fellowship from the American Association of University Women. She held a Guggenheim Fellowship in 1960.

== Publications ==
- "Old Heidelberg Reminds Visitor of Reading Scenes" (1932)
- "Western Pennsylvania in 1836 as seen by a Vermont Doctor" (1933)
- "Three Letters of a Century Ago" (1939)
- "The Long Paper in History" (1944)
- "The University Constituencies in the Recent British Election" (1946)
- University Representation in England, 1604-1690 (1954, based on her dissertation)

== Personal life ==
Rex died in 1966, at the age of 64, in Washington, D.C.
