= Camará River =

River in Marajó, Brazil

- Location within Brazil

Location
- Country: Brazil
- State: Pará

Physical characteristics
- Source
  - location: Mondongo swamps, Marajó
- Mouth
  - location: Marajó Bay
  - coordinates: 0°56′38″S 48°36′30″W
- Length: 55 km (34 mi)
- Basin size: 751 km^{2} (290 sq mi)
- Width
  - maximum: 1.7 km (1.1 mi)

The Camará River (Portuguese: Rio Camará) is a river of Marajó, which itself is an island in the Amazon Delta. It is located in the state Pará in northern Brazil, and forms the border between Salvaterra and Cachoeira do Arari municipalities.

Its source is to the south-east of Lake Guajará, in the swamp areas called mondongos that are normally flooded during the wet season. The river is almost straight at the beginning of its course, becoming suddenly very winding closer to its mouth. Numerous lakes line the banks of the river, the largest being around 8 km (5.0 mi) long and 3.5 km (2.2 mi) wide. There are two small islands near the mouth in Marajó Bay, called Croa Grande and Croinha.

There are several quilombos along the Camará River. In an archeological site called Castanheira, ceramics from the Ananatuba phase (c. 1100 – c. 200 BC) of Marajoara culture were discovered. The river is polluted by chemicals associated with intensive rice cultivation upstream. Near its mouth is a port for ferries to Icoaraci, connecting to Belém.

== See also ==
- List of rivers of Pará
