= Paracauari River =

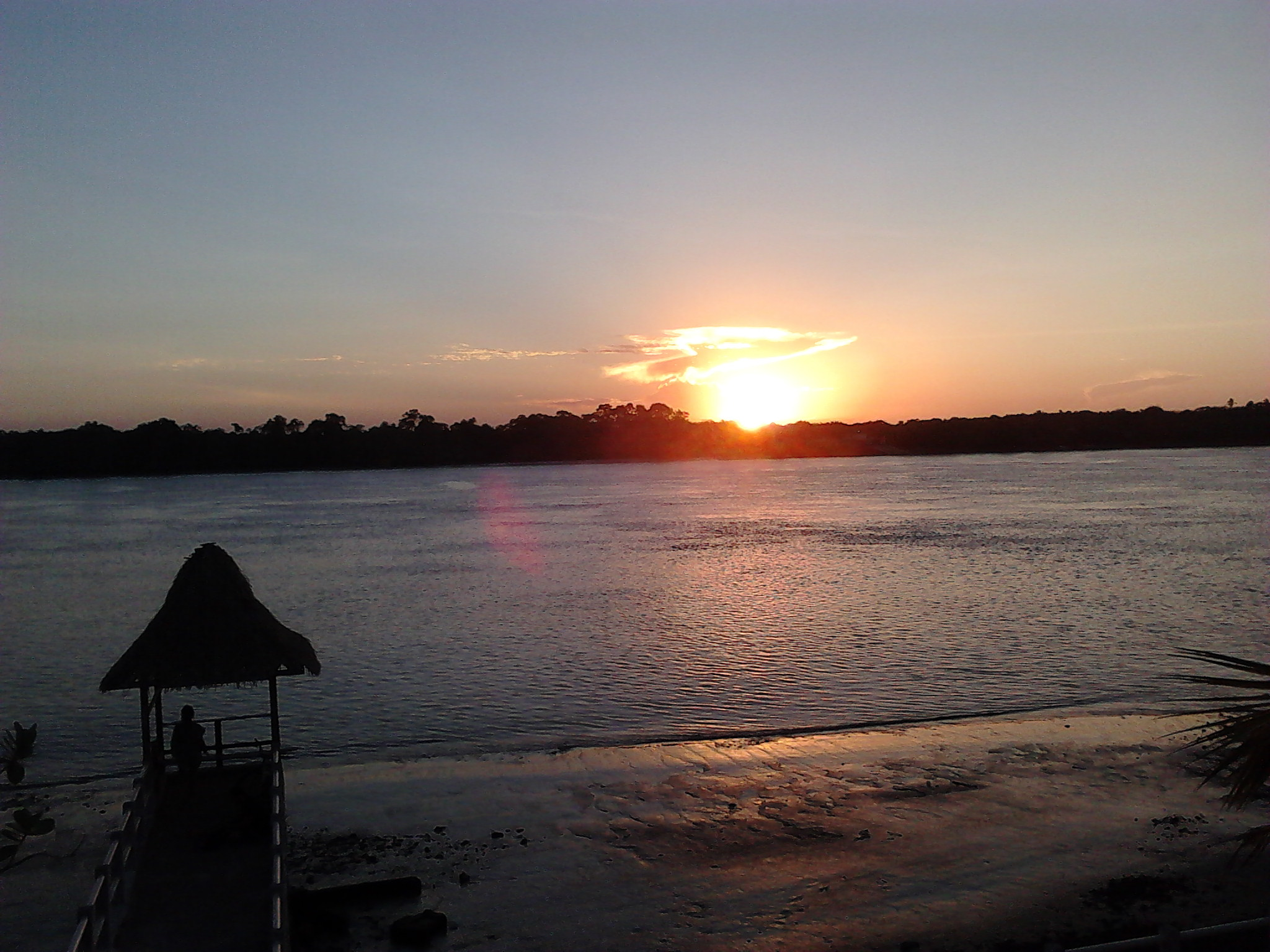
- Sunset on the Paracauari River, seen from Soure

- Location within Brazil

Location
- Country: Brazil
- State: Pará

Physical characteristics
- Source
  - location: Mondongo swamps, Marajó
- Mouth
  - location: Marajó Bay
  - coordinates: 0°45′00″S 48°30′30″W
- Length: 51 km (32 mi)
- Basin size: 1,211 km^{2} (468 sq mi)
- Width
  - maximum: 1 km (0.62 mi)

Basin features
- Tributaries
  - left: Saco River

The Paracauari River (Portuguese: Rio Paracauari, also called Igarapé-Grande) is a river of Marajó, which itself is an island in the Amazon Delta. It is located in the state Pará in northern Brazil. It discharges into the Marajó Bay at the mouth of the Tocantins River. Its main tributaries are the Saco River and the Mangueiras River.

== Course ==
The Paracauari rises in the north-eastern part of the island of Marajó. Its source is in the swamp areas called mondongos that are normally flooded during the wet season. In the high parts of its course, erosion by the river has caused diverse geological layers to be exposed in the rock. The river is navigable for large boats over almost its entire length. The river passes Soure on its left bank and then Salvaterra on its right bank before flowing into Marajó Bay. The river is an important transit point from and to the interior of Marajó for workers, tourism and commerce, because of the ferry connection from Salvaterra to Belém.

The physical and chemical characteristics of the Paracauari River, including its water levels, are strongly influenced by the seasonality of rainfall, wind and tides. During the dry season (July–December), the influence of the salty water from Marajó Bay extends some 40 kilometres (25 mi) upstream to the tributaries Saco River and Mangueiras River. Along the north arm of the Paracuari and Saco rivers, especially where they pass close to the coast, mangrove swamps and sandbanks occur. They present species that are associated with the Marajó várzea biome. More inland, the Paracuari River is lined with lowland broadleaf forest.

The Paracauari River is rather winding, especially close to its mouth. There are many smaller and larger lakes next to its banks, along the full length of its course. A paleochannel connects the river to Lake Arari and through various streams, there is another connection in the north to Cambu River.

Tourist agencies in Soure organise boat tours on the river. Attractions offered are navigating through a "tunnel" of mangrove trees and the possibility to spot boto river dolphins.

The north arm of the Paracuari as well as the Saco River are included in the 27,464 hectares (67,870 acres) Soure Marine Extractive Reserve, a sustainable use conservation area created in 2001 that protects the coastal mangroves.

== History ==
Around 1700, a group of Aruã people lived near the mouth of the Paracauari, under the protection of a missionary called José de Santa Maria. They were harassed by governor Fernão Carrilho up to the point where they were forced to leave their villages.

== See also ==
- List of rivers of Pará
