= Anajá people =

Anajá
Regions with significant populations
- Marajó, Pará, Brazil (8th–17th century)

Languages
- unknown

The Anajá were an indigenous people in Brazil. They lived around the Anajás River in the west of the island Marajó in the Amazon Delta. Their name relates to the maripa fruit, which is called inajá in Brazil. The Anajá were christianised by the Jesuits. There is no information about the classification of their language.

Excavations attest to the expansion of the Marajoara culture along the Anajás River between 700 and 1100 AD. The inhabitants occupied river headwaters, lakes and seasonally flooded areas and reproduced hydraulic control systems to optimise the capture of water, in a system of dams and reservoirs. Platforms were constructed of beaten earth for housing, ceremonies and festivals.

In his ethno-historical maps of 1938–1945, Nimuendajú placed the Anajá in the seventeenth century, classifying their language as "unknown". The Anajá were present when the Treaty of the Mapuá was sworn by various indigenous peoples in front of Portuguese Jesuits led by António Vieira in August 1659. Ceramics from the Marajoara culture are still regularly discovered along the Anajás River, especially when its tributaries run dry.
