= Moções River =

Coordinates: 0°58′57″S 49°56′06″W

- Location within Brazil

Location
- Country: Brazil
- State: Pará

Physical characteristics
- Source
  - location: Mondongo swamps, Marajó
- Mouth
  - location: Anajás River

The Moções River (Portuguese: Rio Moções) is a river of Marajó, which itself is an island in the Amazon Delta. It is located in the state Pará in northern Brazil. Its source is in the swamp areas called mondongos that are normally flooded during the wet season. It is the main tributary of the Anajás River on its right bank. It joins the Anajás opposite the main town along the river, which is also called Anajás.

== See also ==
- List of rivers of Pará
