= Cambu River =

- Location within Brazil

Location
- Country: Brazil
- State: Pará

Physical characteristics
- Source
  - location: Mondongo swamps, Marajó
- Mouth
  - location: Marajó Bay
  - coordinates: 0°31′00″S 48°28′30″W

The Cambu River (Portuguese: Rio Cambu) is a river of Marajó, which itself is an island in the Amazon Delta. It is located in the state Pará in northern Brazil.

Its source is in the municipality Cachoeira do Arari, in the swamp areas called mondongos that are normally flooded during the wet season. For most of its course, it runs through the municipality Soure. The last stretch has been canalised and bears the name Canal Araraquara. The river has a connection with some of the streams that feed into Paracauari River. The Cambu River presents an important potential for artisanal fishing.

== See also ==
- List of rivers of Pará
