= Arari River =

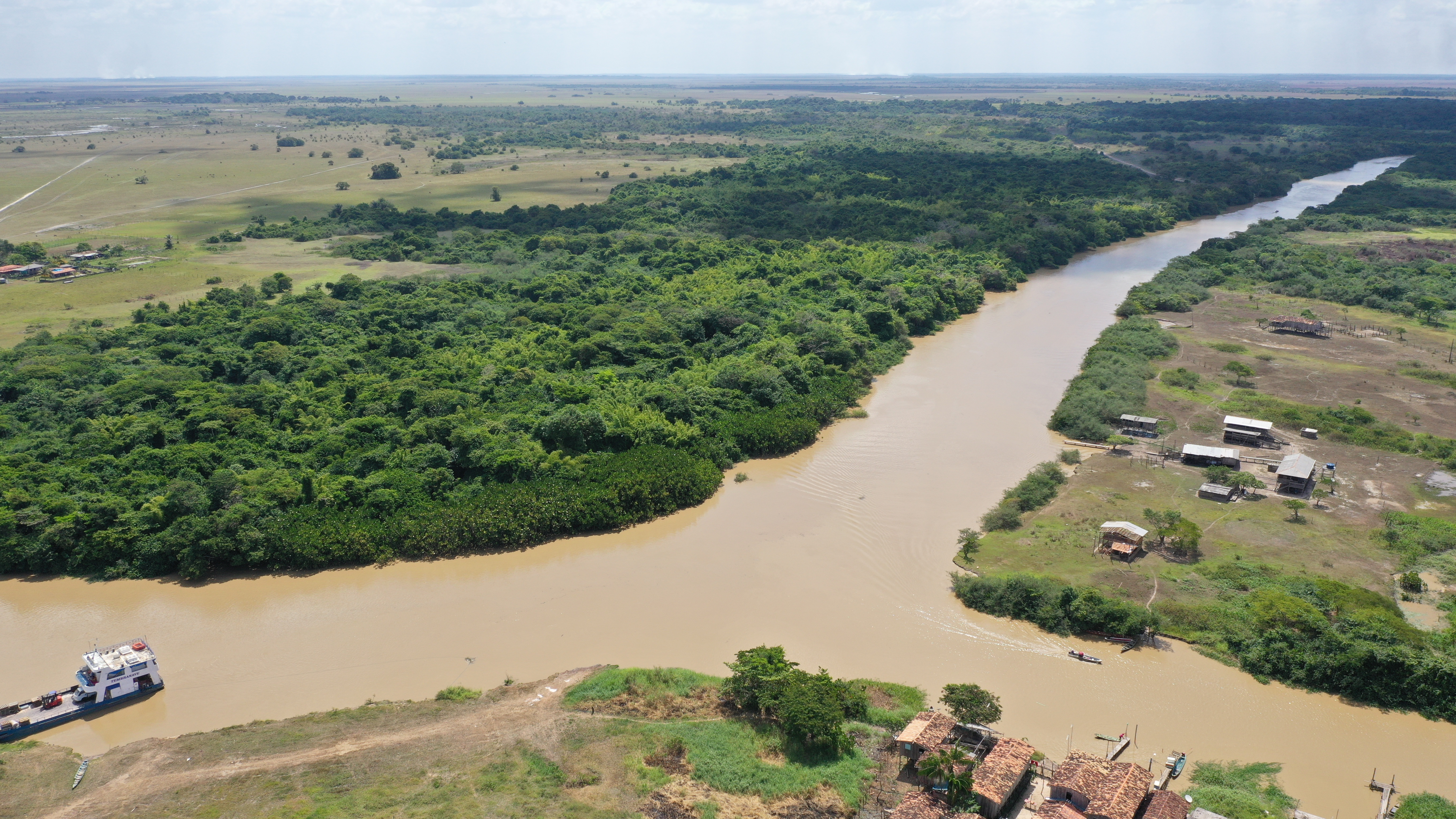
- The Arari River, close to Cachoeira do Arari

Location
- Country: Brazil
- State: Pará

Physical characteristics
- Source
  - location: Lake Arari
- Mouth: Marajó Bay
  - coordinates: 1°11′24″S 48°44′20″W
- Length: 110 km (68 mi)
- Basin size: 7,221 km^{2} (2,788 sq mi)

Basin features
- Cities: Cachoeira do Arari
- Tributaries
  - left: Goiapi River
  - right: Anajás-mirim River; Igarapé das Mercês

The Arari River (Portuguese: Rio Arari) is a river of Marajó, which itself is an island in the Amazon Delta. It is located in the state Pará in northern Brazil.

The river originates in the south of Lake Arari. Here it flows through swamp areas called mondongos that are normally flooded during the wet season. The beginning of its course is rather winded, becoming more straight after passing Cachoeira do Arari. Here the river is covered with aninga plants, giving it a dark and muddy aspect. Close to its mouth in Marajó Bay the river widens and its banks are more rocky. Numerous lakes line the banks of the river, particularly in the middle and downstream sections, the largest being around 10 km (6.2 mi) long and 0.6 km (0.37 mi) wide. The Arari connects to the Marajó-Açu River through a stream called Furo das Laranjeiras.

Depending on seasonal changes of the water level in Marajó Bay, the river sometimes flows in the opposite direction for part of its course. This introduces a seasonality in all its physical and chemical characteristics, like oxygen and nitrogen levels, temperature, acidity, turbidity, water quality and Trophic State Index. The land upstream is used for large water buffalo farms, which saturate the river with nutrients. Smallholder farmers use the river water for domestic use, agriculture and fishing. Tamoatá fish from the basin of the Arari represents 6% of sales in Ver-o-Peso market in Belém.

== See also ==
- List of rivers of Pará
