= Saco River (Paracauari) =

- Location within Brazil
- Native name: Rio Saco (Portuguese)

Location
- Country: Brazil

Physical characteristics
- Mouth
  - coordinates: 0.643827°S 48.581479°W

Basin features
- River system: Paracauari River

The Saco River (Portuguese: Rio Saco) is a river of Marajó, which itself is an island in the mouth of the Amazon. It is a left tributary of the Paracauari River.

== Location ==
The Saco river is on Marajó island in Pará state, and is contained within the Marajó Archipelago Environmental Protection Area. It is a left tributary of the Paracauari River, which enters the Atlantic at Soure, Pará. The mangroves of the left (east) bank of the Saco are protected by the Soure Marine Extractive Reserve. This covers 27,464 hectares (67,870 acres) of typical mangroves forest and tidal waters.

There is a mangrove section called Manguezal do Rio do Saco along the river with area of about 3,534 hectares (8,730 acres). The climate is equatorial Amazon.

== See also ==
- List of rivers of Pará
