= Arapixi River =

- Location within Brazil

Location
- Country: Brazil
- State: Pará

Physical characteristics
- Source
  - location: Mondongo swamps, Marajó
- Mouth
  - location: South Channel, Amazon River
  - coordinates: 0°13′50″S 49°25′20″W

The Arapixi River (Portuguese: Rio Arapixi) is a river of Marajó, which itself is an island in the Amazon Delta. It is located in the state Pará in northern Brazil.

Its source is in the municipality Chaves, in the swamp areas called mondongos that are normally flooded during the wet season. It starts as a stream called Igarapé Fundo and is fed by the Igarapé dos Cajueiros, Igarapé da Mandioca, Igarapé Santa Maria, Santo Antônio River, Juncal River and Egito River. There is a sandbank near its mouth in the South Channel (Canal Sul) of the Amazon that only enables boats to enter during high tides. The river is winding but navigable for two thirds of its length. It runs through grassy fields with a thin line of trees on its banks.

On its right bank there is a village called São Sebastião do Arapixi (0°15′30″S 49°26′05″W) with 325 inhabitants who dedicate themselves to artisanal fishing, the collection of açaí, animal husbandry and commerce.

Near the river there is an archeological site in the form of a mound called a teso. Curt Nimuendajú wanted to visit it in 1922, but didn't get permission from the land owner. In February 1944 an RAF plane crashed near the mouth of the river.

== See also ==
- List of rivers of Pará
