= Mondongos =

Swamp fields in Marajó, Pará, Brazil

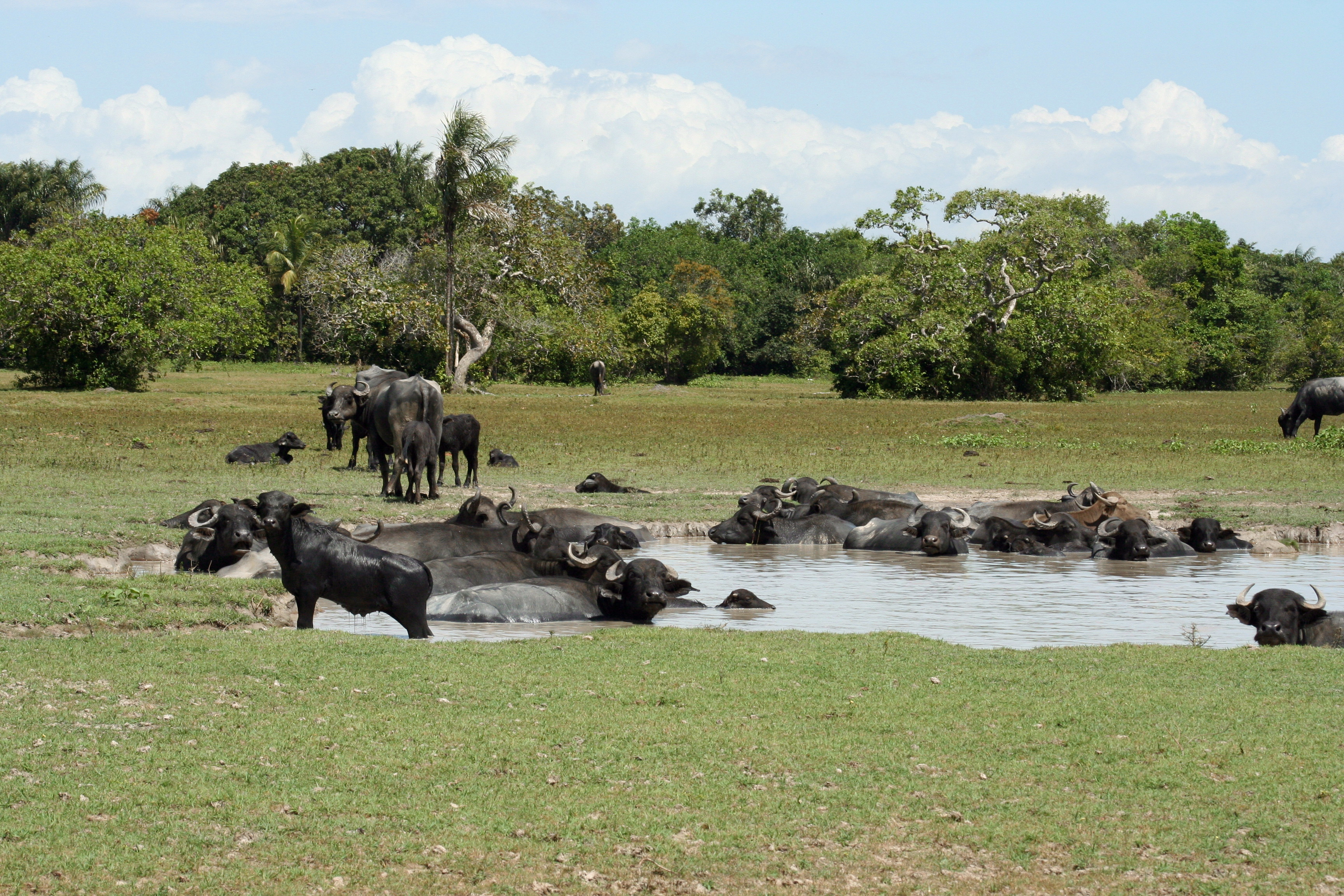
Water buffaloes in a Marajó swamp

The mondongos are low-lying swamp fields in the north of the island Marajó in the Brazilian state Pará. They are flooded during the wet season, which occurs between January and May. The mondongos occur in the transition zone between the tropical rainforest on the west of the island and the savannas in the east. They stretch for around 90 kilometres (56 mi).

The mondongos are situated on an old arm of the Amazon River that crossed the island Marajó when it was still forming. A ridge of sandstone separates them from the current main channel of this river. According to Ferreira Penna, the mondongos were created when the Amazon deposited sediments against this ridge. The many streams in the area have tides that are influenced by the Amazon, not by the Pará River.

The mondongos are largely covered with swamp rice grass and water hyacinths. Their roots form a dense mass that makes the area difficult to thread. The edges of the mondongos, as well as the banks of the many streams are lined with aninga flowers. Among the fauna are caimans, marsh turtles and anacondas. Wood storks have their nests here.

Many elevations called tesos were identified that were used by Indigenous peoples for protection during high water. In the present day, large farms let their water buffaloes graze in the area. Mondongos can also be found on the islands that surround Marajó, especially on Caviana.

== Lakes and rivers ==
There are some permanent lakes, the largest being Lake Arari and Lake Guajará. Many rivers and streams originate on the mondongos, including:

- Anajás River
- Aramá River
- Arapixi River
- Arari River
- Camará River
- Cambu River
- Furo Charapucu
- Cururu River
- Ganhoão River
- Moções River
- Paracauari River
- Tartarugas River
