= Marajó-Açu River =

- Location within Brazil

Location
- Country: Brazil
- State: Pará

Physical characteristics
- Mouth
  - location: Marajó Bay
  - coordinates: 1°25′30″S 48°49′00″W

The Marajó-Açu River (Portuguese: Rio Marajó-Açu) is a river of Marajó, which itself is an island in the Amazon Delta. It is located in the state Pará in northern Brazil.

Some of its tributaries are the Muirim River, the Cachoeirinha River, the Fortaleza River and the São José River. The Marajó-Açu connects to the Arari River through a furo river channel called Furo das Laranjeiras. The basin of the Marajó-Açu River is entirely within Ponta de Pedras municipality. It flows into the Marajó Bay near its main town. The river is deep and narrow, and navigable nearly until the centre of Marajó.

The Portuguese settled along the river during colonial times, later naming the entire island Marajó after the river.

== See also ==
- List of rivers of Pará
