= Chaves Municipality =

Chaves Municipality may refer to:

== Places ==
=== Brazil ===
- Chaves, Brazil, a municipality in the State of Pará

=== Portugal ===
- Chaves Municipality, Portugal, a municipality in the district of Vila Real
