= Soure Marine Extractive Reserve =

- Reserva Extrativista Marinha de Soure
- IUCN category VI (protected area with sustainable use of natural resources)
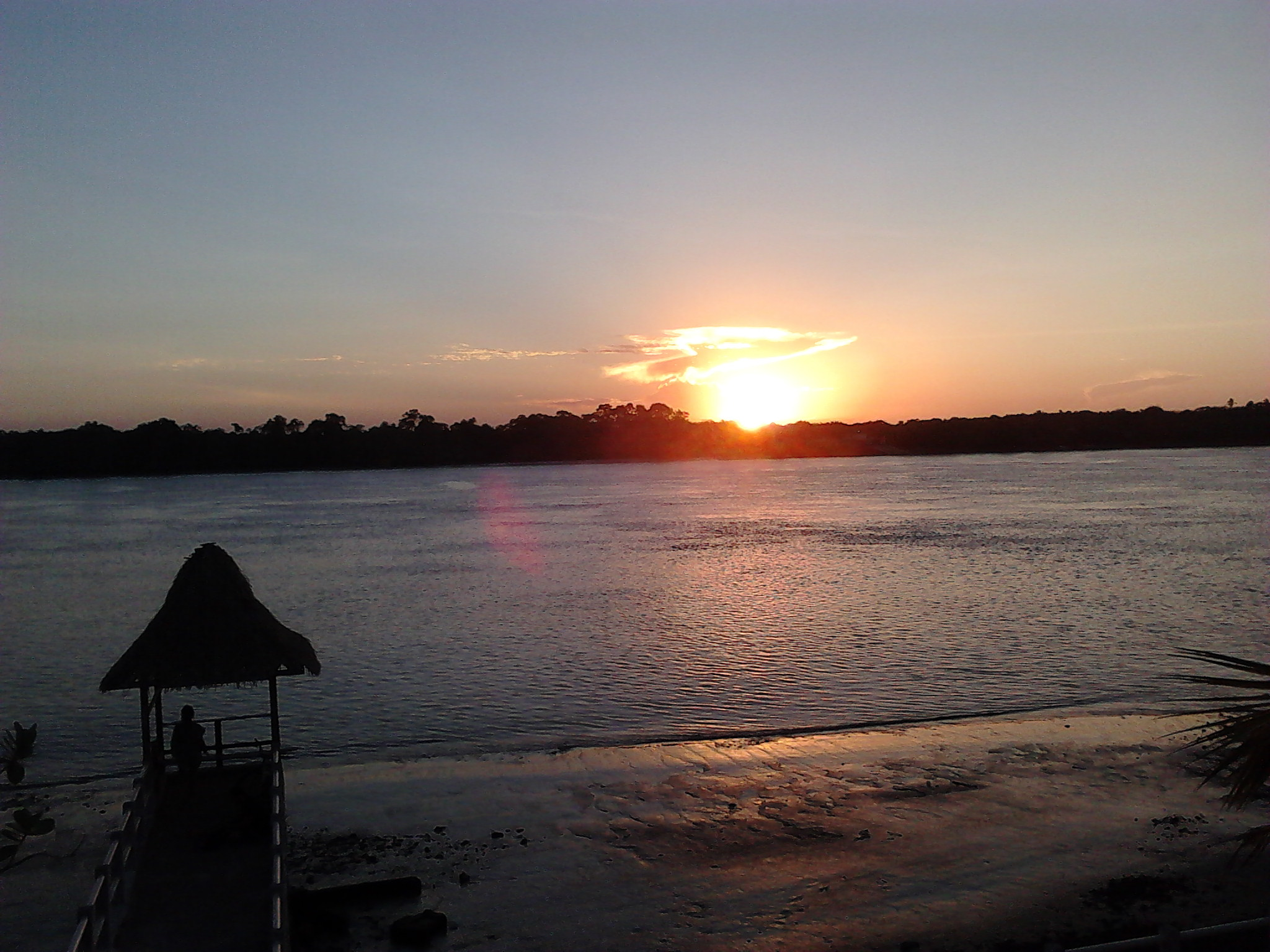
- Soure

- Location within Brazil
- Nearest city: Soure, Pará
- Coordinates: 0°28′18″S 48°27′51″W
- Area: 27,464 hectares (67,870 acres)
- Designation: Extractive reserve
- Created: 23 November 2001
- Administrator: Chico Mendes Institute for Biodiversity Conservation

The Soure Marine Extractive Reserve (Portuguese: Reserva Extrativista Marinha de Soure) is an extractive reserve in the state of Pará, Brazil.

== Location ==
Conservation units northeast of Belém: 5. Soure Marine Extractive Reserve

The Soure Marine Extractive Reserve is in the municipality of Soure, Pará, on Marajó island and is contained within the Marajó Archipelago Environmental Protection Area. It covers 27,464 hectares (67,870 acres) of typical mangroves forest and tidal waters. The riverine Manguezal do Rio do Saco section has an area of about 3,534 hectares (8,730 acres) along the Saco River, a left (north) tributary of the Paracauari River. The coastal Manguezal de Soure section has an area of about 23,929 hectares (59,130 acres), extending north from the municipal seat of Soure to the northeast corner of Marajó island. The climate is equatorial Amazon. There are three villages: Pesqueiro, Caju-Úna and Céu.

== History ==
The Soure Marine Extractive Reserve was created by presidential decree on 23 November 2001. The deliberative council was created on 26 November 2003. In December 2005 a project to engage the traditional communities in support of ecotourism was approved by the reserve's board, with the support of the Spanish Agency for International Cooperation (AECI) and Secretariat of Sustainable Development of the Ministry of the Environment. On 23 March 2010 responsibility for administering the reserve was transferred to the Chico Mendes Institute for Biodiversity Conservation (ICMBio). In 2013 ICMBio taught about 140 students from public schools in the town of Soure about the mangroves and how to protect them, including classroom talks and field trips.

== People and economy ==
There are 1,400 people in the reserve in twelve communities. The main economic activity in nine communities is crab picking, with 278 people engaged in this work. 89.2% of the crab pickers are male and 51% are over 40 years old. Most have little education, and 21% are illiterate. During the off season they turn to shrimping or fishing. About 55% of crabbers earn less than the minimum wage. The families also gather or cultivate plants. 51% of families get water from community wells. 92.4% have inadequate sewage systems. Almost all garbage is buried, burned or used as fertiliser.

The occupants of the reserve are only partially aware of the conservation rules. Unlike fishers from the town of Soure, they do not engage in trawling with nets. However, they do capture female crabs, and are not aware that this is illegal. The main threat to their livelihood is predatory crabbing by professionals from outside the reserve. Other issues are failure to receive aid payments, illegal extraction of sand from the beaches, solid waste on the beaches and changes to water quality.

== Sources ==
- Lobato, Gerciene de Jesus Miranda; Tavares-Martins, Ana Cláudia Caldeira; Lucas, Flávia Cristina Araújo; Morales, Gundisalvo Piratoba; Rocha, Tainá Teixeira (2014), "Reserva extrativista marinha de soure, pará, brasil: modo de vida das comunidades e ameaças ambientais", Biota Amazônia (in Portuguese), 4 (4)
- Mattos, Marluza (27 December 2006), Resex Marinha de Soure terá projeto de ecoturismo (in Portuguese), MMA: Ministério do Meio Ambiente
- Projeto da Resex Marinha de Soure recebe premiação (in Portuguese), ICMBio, 28 January 2014
- Rabêlo, Hinglia Moura; Turiel do Nascimento, Eduardo (July 2010), "Unidades de conservação: o plano de manejo da reserva extrativista marinha de Soure, Ilha do Marajó, estado do Pará", Anais/Resumos da 62ª Reunião Anual da SBPC (in Portuguese), SBPC: Sociedade Brasileira para o Progresso da Ciência, ISSN 2176-1221
- RESEX Marinha de Soure (in Portuguese), ISA: Instituto Socioambiental
