= Aruã people =

Aruã
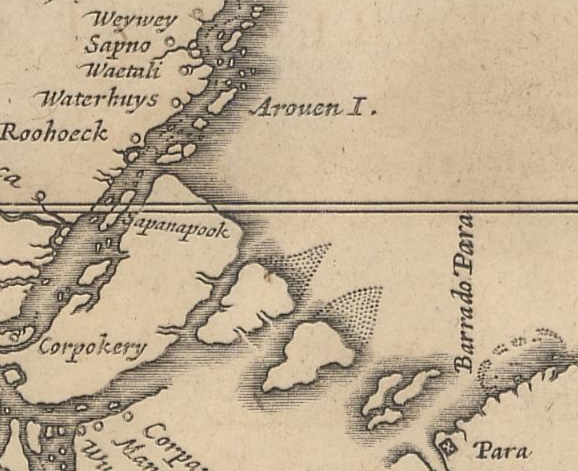
- Excerpt of the map "Guyana" by Joannes de Laet (1625) showing the Arouen Islands

Regions with significant populations
- Caviana and Marajó (17th and 18th Century); French Guiana and Amapá (migrations)

Languages
- Aruã language

The Aruã were an Indigenous people in Brazil. In the 17th and 18th century, they lived near the mouth of the Amazon River. Their stronghold was on the island Caviana, with a large presence in the north-east of the island Marajó. The Aruã language belongs to the Arawakan family.

== Name ==
Through the centuries, people who described the Aruã have used different spellings for their name. When ethnographist Ferreira Penna spoke in 1877 with the last Aruã in the town Afuá, who was around 75 years old, he self-designated their people as Àroanáuintá.

The first written mention of their name is in documents from 1621 by the Irish settler Bernard O'Brien, who spells it as Arrua. On maps of Guyana by Joannes de Laet from the year 1625, a group of islands north of Marajó is denoted Arouen I. Walloon Huguenot Jessé de Forest wrote about the Arouen who "wear their hair long like women". On later maps the name Aruans appears.

Aruã is the accepted spelling in academic works by the Museu Paraense Emílio Goeldi and by the Federal University of Pará. In the north of Amapá the spelling Aruá is sometimes used, influenced by French Creole.

== Aruã society ==
Few written records on Aruã society exist. From the Aruã language a vocabulary of a few dozen words remains, recorded by Ferreira Penna in 1877. At least seven works were written about them by Capuchin missionaries in the 18th Century, but they have all been lost.

The Aruã had their stronghold on the eastern side of the island Caviana, which they called Uyruma. Their chief in the mid of the seventeenth century was called Piyé. By that time, they called the place where they lived Piyé's Village (Aldeia de Piyé). They practiced secondary burial in urns. Their cemeteries contain urns in different styles and also some glass beads and other European objects. This indicates that the island was inhabited by other groups besides the Aruã, or that they traded intensively.

In 1760, the missionary Antônio de Santo Agostinho arrived in the village and renamed it Rebordello. The village suffered a fire in 1763. It had a mission post of the Order of Saint Anthony.

In the present day, the urn cemeteries on Caviana are considered archeological sites. Also on the coast of Marajó near Chaves, ceramic fragments could be found that relate to them. However, in recent years the advance of the Vieira Grande Bay washed them away.

== Struggles with the colonists ==
The Aruã were frequently caught in the crossfire in the struggles between the Portuguese, the French (who were operating from Cayenne) and the Dutch who all tried to dominate trade in the region. The harsh treatment inflicted on them by the Portuguese drove them to see the Dutch and the French as allies. The Portuguese tried to force them to perform hard labour but didn't succeed, putting them to work as sentinels instead. However, the Aruã also suffered attacks from the French. Between 1725 and 1728, the French repeatedly attacked them together with an indigenous group from the island Mexiana under their leader Gaaimara.

They Aruã reacted to their treatment with violence. One such incident occurred from 29 to 30 June 1643, when a ship carrying Jesuit missionary Luís Figueira shipwrecked on the Pará River and all passengers who reached the coast of Marajó were killed by them. In contrast, they maintained trade relations with the Dutch.

In 1654 the Portuguese launched an expedition from the city of Belém against the Aruã and other indigenous groups. In 1655, Jesuit missionary António Vieira succeeded in having the laws that sanctioned slavery of indigenous peoples abolished in the area. In 1658 however, another armed expedition was prepared. It was never realised and in 1659, the Treaty of the Mapuá was signed between the Portuguese and various indigenous peoples. The Aruã were present at the ceremony with their chief Piyé. During the ceremony, he refused to swear on oath of obedience to the Kingdom of Portugal.

In 1661 the Portuguese revolted because of a shortage of slaves, and slavery was reinstated. This effectively put an end to the Treaty of the Mapuá after only two years. Hostilities against the various indigenous peoples continued afterwards. In 1701, governor Fernão Carrilho held a campaign of harassment against the Aruã. Near the mouth of the Paracauari River, they lived under the protection of a missionary called José de Santa Maria. When he was absent, the governor and his men mistreated them and they left their villages. When Santa Maria returned with another missionary, both were killed. In punishment, 200 Aruã were captured the next year and some of them were executed.

== Migrations and relocations ==
After having suffered decades of mistreatment by the Portuguese, many Aruã tried to flee the region. Most of them tried to migrate to Brazilian Guiana (a region coinciding with the present-day state Amapá) and what is now French Guiana. The Portuguese feared that if the French had access to them or if the Dutch managed to establish trade with them, their adversaries would be strengthened by their numbers. To prevent this, they started a series of forced relocations of the Aruã:

- In 1698, the Aruã who on the northern coast were declared undesirable by the Portuguese, mainly because of their friendly relations with the Dutch. Many of them were forcibly removed to the state Maranhão.
- In 1702, those who lived near the Ganhoão River on the Northern coast of Marajó were moved to an Arawak village on the Urubu River, in the present-day state Amazonas.
- Between 1765 and 1768, the Portuguese attacked Jesuit missions in French Guiana, trying to deport the Indigenous population back to the Amazon delta.
- The Portuguese repeatedly tried to bring the Aruã back from Brazilian Guiana (Amapá). To achieve this, they depopulated the entire coastline between 1784 and 1798. They founded a village close to Belém to try and settle them, but most of them escaped in their canoes back to Guiana.
- In 1793, the Aruã who had remained around Chaves were transferred to the lower Tocantins River. A village called Moru (3°33′40″S 49°36′30″W) was founded for them, which is now part of the municipality Breu Branco.

Because of these migrations and relocations, the Aruã disappeared from the Marajó Archipelago in the 19th Century. In 1816, there were still 279 Aruã in Rebordello. The last probably disappeared from the area after the Revolt of the Cabanos between 1834 and 1836.

Also in French Guiana the Aruã were enslaved. Between 1701 and 1727, they joined the French on an expedition back to the Marajó Bay to attack the Portuguese. At the start, they laid siege to the village Murubira on the island Mosqueiro for a year. Later, they settled in Jesuit missions on the coast. For example from 1738 to 1744, a missionary called Lombard gathered a group of Aruã together with other peoples in Ouanary.

In what was later called Amapá, Pierre Barrère recorded a presence of the Aruã on the south of the Amapá Grande River in 1743, noting their ability as seamen. Part of the Aruã settled along the Uaçá River, where they mixed with the Galibi, the Marworno and other peoples. Around 1890, they still spoke among each other in the Aruã language. However by 1926, no-one could be found anymore who spoke it. The mixed group later self-designated as the Galibi Marworno, and speaks Karipúna French Creole and Portuguese.
