= Zélia Amador =

Afro-Brazilian academic and activist (1951-2026)

- Born: 24 October 1951; Soure, Marajó, Pará, Brazil
- Died: September 8, 2026 (aged 74)
- Occupation: Academic
- Employer: Federal University of Pará (UFPA)
- Known for: Campaigning for rights of Afro-Brazilian people

Zélia Amador de Deus (24 October 1951 - 8 September 2026) was a Brazilian university professor emerita, activist for the rights of the black population, an advocate for affirmative action in higher education, an actress and theatre director. She was one of the founders of the "Centre for Studies and Defence of Black People" in the Brazilian state of Pará.

== Early life and education ==
Amador was born on 24 October 1951 in Soure in the quilombo territory of Mangueiras on the Amazon river island of Marajó in Pará. Daughter of a teenage mother, Doralice Amador, who worked as a maid and, seasonally, in a chestnut factory, she moved to Belém, capital of Pará, when she was 15 and lived in the Sacramenta neighbourhood of the city. She studied at Externato Santo Expedito and later continued at the Instituto Catarina Labouré, a Catholic school, where she was so advanced in mathematics that the teacher asked her to help with assisting the other students. With little money, she worked as a cook for a neighbour to get the money for bus fares to school. Before entering university, she studied at the Pará Education Institute (IEP).

Although she had experienced episodes of racism in her childhood, it was while at high school that she became more militant in the black movement, playing a role in the establishment of the Frente de Ação Secundarista Paraense (Paraense High School Action Front - FASPA), created in 1968, a year marked by an increase in repression by the military dictatorship in Brazil and student unrest in many other countries. In 1974, Amador obtained an undergraduate degree in the Portuguese language from the Federal University of Pará (UFPA). In the same year she took an actor training course. After graduating she became active in the theatre. In 1978, she began a course in literary theory, also at UFPA. In 2001 she received a master's degree in literary studies from the Federal University of Minas Gerais (UFMG) at Belo Horizonte, with a dissertation on the Amazonian writer Dalcídio Jurandir, and in 2008, a doctorate in social sciences from UFPA.

== Academic career ==
Amador was a teacher at the Federal University of Pará from 1978, where she taught history of art; history and theory of the theatre; and aesthetics. She served as director of the Centre for Letters and Arts at UFPA from 1989 to 1993 and vice-rector of UFPA from 1993 to 1997, the first black woman vice-rector in Brazil. She was co-founder of the Centre for Studies and Defence of Black People in Pará (CEDENPA) in 1980, which has been responsible for important changes in legislation, such as the recognition of quilombola lands in the state and the establishment of compensatory measures for people discriminated against in the job market. She was coordinator of the UFPA Arts Centre from 1997 to 2001, co-founder of the Centre for Afro-Brazilian Studies (NEAB) at UFPA in 2001, co-founder of the Afro-Amazonian Study Group at UFPA in 2003 and president of the Brazilian Association of Black Researchers (ABPN). She was made a professor emerita at UFPA in 2019.

== Political Activity ==
Before starting her undergraduate course, Amador was already active in social movements. She joined the Ação Popular (Popular Action - AP), an extra-parliamentary left-wing political organization, created in June 1962, with origins in the Juventude Universitária Católica (Catholic University Youth - JUC) but left it when the AP merged with merged with the Communist Party of Brazil. She then joined the Vanguarda Armada Revolucionária Palmares a far-left organization. In 1980 she was one of the founders of the Centro de Estudos e Defesa do Negro do Pará (Centre for Studies and Defence of Black People in Pará – CEDENPA) and it was through this organization that she worked to defend the recognition and titling of lands belonging to quilombola communities in Pará.

== Awards and tributes ==
A short film was made about Amador in 2021, and shown at several film festivals in Brazil. Among many honours, Amador was given the BrazilFoundation's Human Rights Award in October 2021. The Foundation is a philanthropic body that invests in Brazil. In 2022 she was honoured by the Os Colibris Samba School of Belém, which based their Carnival parade on her as a representative of black identity and resistance.
