= Cururu River =

Cururu River may refer to:

- Cururu River (Marajó)
- Cururu River (Tapajós River)
