= Curt Nimuendajú =

German anthropologist (1883–1945)

- Born: Curt Unckel; 18 April 1883; Jena, Germany
- Died: 10 December 1945 (aged 62); Brazil

Academic work
- Discipline: Anthropologist
- Main interests: Indigenous peoples in Brazil

Curt Unckel Nimuendajú (born Curt Unckel; 18 April 1883 – 10 December 1945) was a German-Brazilian ethnologist, anthropologist, and writer. His works are fundamental for the understanding of the religion and cosmology of some native Brazilian Indians, especially the Guaraní people. He received the surname "Nimuendajú" from the Apapocuva subgroup of the Guaraní people, meaning "the one who made himself a home", one year after living among them. Upon taking Brazilian citizenship in 1922, he officially added Nimuendajú as one of his surnames. On his obituary, his Brazilian-German colleague Herbert Baldus called him "perhaps the greatest Indianista of all time".

== Life and work ==
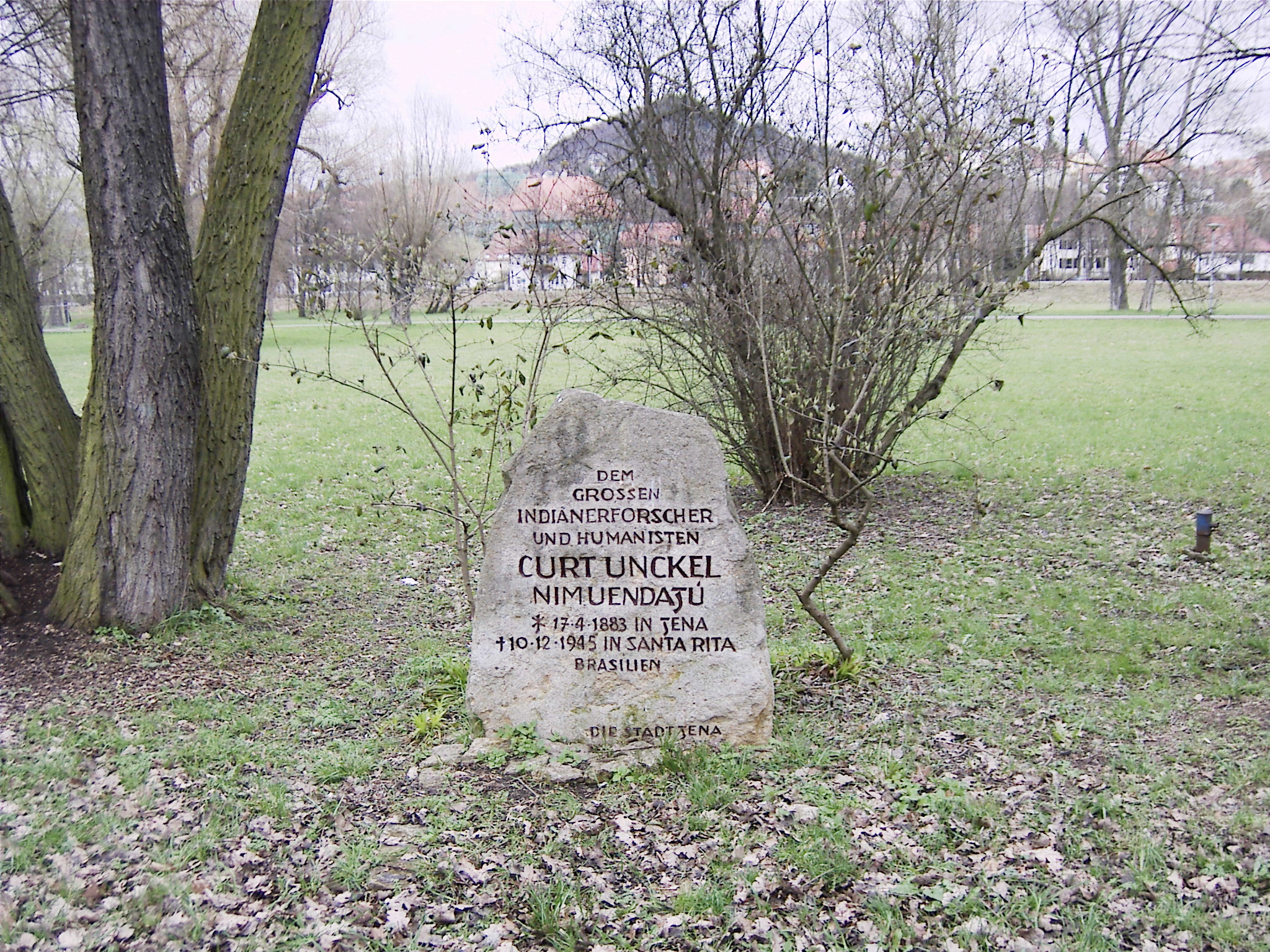
Memorial stone in Jena.

Nimuendajú was born in Wagnergasse 31, Jena, Germany in 1883 and he lost either one of or both his parents in his childhood. From an early age, he dreamed of living among a 'primitive people'. Still in school, together with other students they organized an 'Indian gang' to go hunting in the woods outside the city. Lacking the financial means to attend a university, he worked in a camera factory run by Carl Zeiss. Meanwhile, he studied maps and the ethnographic studies of the Indian populations of North and South America in his free time. At the age of 20, he emigrated to Brazil in 1903. His half-sister, who was a school teacher, paid for the travel expenses to South America.

Two years after his arrival in Brazil, he contacted some Guaraní people in the State of São Paulo. Although there were many publications on the Guaraní since the 17th century, their religious behavior such as rituals was poorly described. Nimuendajú familiarized himself thoroughly with the existing literature. He published "Nimongarai" (1910) in the German São Paulo newspaper Deutsche Zeitung. In 1913, he moved to Belém. In 1914, his groundbreaking publication on the mythology and religion of the Guaraní Apapokúva was accepted by the Zeitschrift für Ethnologie. He became a specialist on various Indigenous peoples, particularly on the Gê, as well as Apapocuva-Guaraní, Ticuna, Kaingang, Apinaye, Xerente, Wanano and Canela. His publications laid, in the words of one recent writer:

'the indispensable groundwork from which dozens of doctoral dissertations and books have been elaborated by Brazilian and American anthropologists.'

One of the effects of his work was to shift interest from the tribes living along the coast or in large towns, to the tribes hidden in the interior, and to arouse the interests of anthropologists like the young Claude Lévi-Strauss, in communities that, though living in poverty, had managed to develop societies of considerable complexity, and religious cosmologies of great complexity. Over the span of 40 years of fieldwork, much of it self-financed, he published about 60 articles, monographs, and vocabulary lists of indigenous languages.

Between 1923 and 1924 he was one of the first to carry out scientific research on the Atlantic islands in the mouth of the Amazon. He worked at the service of the Museum of Gothenburg and had the support of Erland Nordenskiöld. Departing from Chaves, he was not allowed to deboard at Mexiana. Instead he went to Caviana, where he conducted excavations on Aruã cemeteries and collected oral information from the island's inhabitants.

Between 1929 and 1936 he spent 14 months with the Canela Indians, a Gê-speaking people on the northeastern edge of the central plateau of Brazil, and his monograph on them, translated and annotated by Robert Lowie, was published posthumously in 1946. His work on the Apinaye drew attention because it had many features that made it anomalous to the genre structure of the Gê societies to which it belonged in classification. This Apinaye anomaly was one that, while sharing the marked dualism of other related tribal societies, maintained a prescriptive marriage system, with sons incorporated into their father's group and daughters into their mothers' group, that did not fit the Crow-Omaha pattern that he, and Lowie had observed in the Gê tribal system generally.

Despite failing health and warnings from his doctors, he set forth on what was to prove to be his last ethnographic survey in 1945 and was killed on 10 December, among the Tukúna people, by the Solimões river, near São Paulo de Olivença, Amazonas state. According to the German anthropologist Otto Zerries, he was slain because he had sex with a non-initiated girl. His ashes are kept in the São Paulo Museum of Art.

The Curt Nimuendajú archives were housed at the National Museum of Brazil. They were completely destroyed in the fire that engulfed the museum in September 2018.

=== Ethno-historical map ===
During the period 1938 to 1945, Nimuendajú created four maps summarising the knowledge acquired in his career. These show the distributions of indigenous populations in and around Brazil. As well as showing current locations, he used arrows to indicate how groups moved in response to colonization. The maps were given to the State Museum of Pernambuco, the Smithsonian Institution, the National Museum of Brazil in Rio de Janeiro and the Emilio Goeldi Museum in Belém. The map at the Emilio Goeldi Museum, along with its bibliography giving hundreds of references, was added by UNESCO to its Memory of the World International Register in 2025, recognising it as documentary heritage of global importance. Measuring 2.20 metres (7.2 ft) by 1.86 metres (6.1 ft), the map has information on around 1,400 Indigenous groups. Writing in 2002, the anthropologist Eduardo Viveiros de Castro described the map as "a historic cartographic accomplishment of enormous scope and a precious document".

== Works ==
- The Šerente, (ed. Robert H. Lowie), The Southwest Museum, 1942
- The Eastern Timbira, (ed. Robert H. Lowie), University of California Press, 1946
- The Tukuna, (ed. Robert H. Lowie) University of California Press, 1952
- The Apinayé, (tr. and ed. Robert H. Lowie, John M. Cooper), Catholic University of America Press, 1939

Lexicons

- Nimuendajú, K. (1925). As Tribus do Alto Madeira. Journal de la Société des Américanistes, 17:137-172.
- Nimuendajú, K. (1932a). Idiomas Indígenas del Brasil. Revista del Instituto de etnología de la Universidad nacional de Tucumán, 2:543-618.
- Nimuendajú, K. (1932b). Wortlisten aus Amazonien. Journal de la Société des Américanistes de Paris, 24:93-119.
- Nimuendajú, K.; Do Valle Bentes, E. H. (1923). Documents sur quelques langues peu connues de l'Amazone. Journal de la Société des Américanistes, 15:215-222.

== Bibliography ==
- Herbert Baldus, 'Curt Nimuendaju, 1883-1945'. American Anthropologist, 1946, Vol. 48, pp. 238–243.
- Herbert Baldus review of Nimuendaju The Eastern Timbira. 1960. https://www.jstor.org/stable/663694
- Born, Joachim, "Curt Unckel Nimuendajú - ein Jenenser als Pionier im brasilianischen Nord(ost)en", Wien, 2007.
- Janet M. Chernela, The Wanano Indians of the Brazilian Amazon: A Sense of Space, University of Texas Press, 1993.
- Virginia Kerns, Scenes from the high desert: Julian Steward's life and theory, University of Illinois Press, 2003.
- Claude Lévi-Strauss, Tristes tropiques, Plon, Paris, 1955.
- Georg Menchén, Nimuendajú. Bruder der Indianer, Leipzig 1979.
- Günther F. Dungs, Die Feldforschung von Curt Unckel Nimuendajú und ihre theoretisch-methodischen Grundlagen, 1991.
- Mércio Pereira Gomes The Indians and Brazil, University Press of Florida, 2000, 3rd edition.
- Frank Lindner, Curt Unckel-Nimuendajú. Jenas großer Indianerforscher. Jena 1996.
- Lúcia Sá, Rain forest literatures: Amazonian texts and Latin American culture, University of Minnesota Press, 2004.
- Welper, Elena M. "Curt Unckel Nimuendaju: um capítulo alemão na tradiçao etnografica Brasileira", 2002, TD PPGAS-MN/UFRJ.
