= Arapixi =

Arapixi may refer to:

- Arapixi River, a river in the Brazilian state Pará
- Arapixi Extractive Reserve, a protected area in the Brazilian state Amazonas
- Igarapé Arapixi, a stream in the Brazilian state Roraima
