= Lake Guajará =

Lake in Pará, Brazil

- Lago Guajará (Portuguese)
- Location within Brazil
- Location: Marajó
- Coordinates: 0°33′30″S 49°02′00″W
- Basin countries: Brazil

Lake Guajará (Portuguese: Lago Guajará) is a lake of Marajó, which itself is an island in the Amazon Delta. It lies slightly to the north-east of Lake Arari. It is located in the state Pará in northern Brazil, on the border between the municipalities Salvaterra and Cachoeira do Arari. During the dry season, the waters of Lake Guajará are coloured bright green due to an abundance of phytoplankton and algae.

There is an elevated mound called a teso next to the lake, which was visited by William Stebbins Barnard in 1870. Many local legends surround the lake, some of which were eternalised in the novel Marajó by Dalcídio Jurandir. They talk about an underground connection between Lake Guajará and the Atlantic Ocean through the Paracauari River.
