= Tartarugas River =

- Location within Brazil

Location
- Country: Brazil
- State: Pará

Physical characteristics
- Source
  - location: Mondongo swamps, Marajó
- Mouth
  - location: Atlantic Ocean
  - coordinates: 0°14′S 48°55′W

The Tartarugas River (Portuguese: Rio Tartarugas) is a river of Marajó, which itself is an island in the Amazon Delta. It is located in the state Pará in northern Brazil, and forms the border between the municipalities Chaves and Soure.

The source of Tartartugas River is in the swamp areas called mondongos that are normally flooded during the wet season. When the area around the source is flooded, it is sometimes called Lake Tartarugas (Lago Tartarugas). It has a connection to Lake Arari through the Jenipapucu River. It is fed by a stream called Igarapé Jararaca.

Part of the river was canalised in the first half of the 20th Century, named the Tartarugas Canal (Canal Tartarugas). This was done to connect Lake Arari to the Atlantic Ocean, and also to facilitate drainage of the area in times of flooding. Because of this, the river can be navigated well.

Along the river there are several elevations called tesos. They contain indigenous cemeteries with human remains buried in ceramic pots according to Marajoara culture. Depending on the water level, the tesos can present themselves as islands in the river, which is how naturalist Alexandre Rodrigues Ferreira described them in the 18th Century.

== See also ==
- List of rivers of Pará
