= Caviana =

River island in Marajó Archipelago, Brazil

- Inner and Outer Caviana on a WorldWind satellite image from 1990

- Location within Brazil

Geography
- Location: Pará State, Brazil
- Coordinates: 0°10′N 50°0′W
- Archipelago: Marajó Archipelago
- Area: 2,944 km^{2} (1,137 sq mi)
- Length: 98 km (60.9 mi)
- Width: 45 km (28 mi)

Administration
- Brazil
- State: Pará
- Municipality: Chaves

Caviana (Portuguese: Ilha Caviana, formerly in Aruã language: Uyruma) is a coastal island in the Brazilian state Pará. The island is part of the Amazon Delta. In the 17th and 18th Century it was the stronghold of the Aruã people. From the island a tidal bore called the pororoca can be observed. Between 1845 and 1850, a strong pororoca split the island into two parts, called Inner and Outer Caviana.

== Location ==
Administratively, Caviana is part of the municipality Chaves in the Brazilian state Pará. The Equator runs through Outer Caviana, as does the 50th meridian west. It is the third-largest island in the Amazon Delta, after Marajó and Ilha Grande de Gurupá.

The island belongs to the Marajó Archipelago. It is located in the delta lowlands at the mouth of the Amazon, between the north coast of Marajó Island and the coast of Amapá. It is surrounded by Janaucu and Jarupari in the north, Mexiana in the east and the Jurupari Archipelago in the west. It is separated from Mexiana by the Canal Perigoso ("Dangerous Channel"), called such because sandbanks and strong winds make navigation perilous during low tides.

Just off Caviana's southern coast, where the South Channel (Canal Sul) of the Amazon meets the Vieira Grande Bay, is a sandbank called Camaleão. At lower tides, it forms a group of islets. Somewhat confusingly, there are two islands in the neighbourhoud of Caviana called Ilha da Paca ("island of lowland pacas"). One is in Vieira Grande Bay, to the west of Camaleão, the other one is in Canal Perigoso.

== Geology ==
Geologically, Caviana is of mixed origin, made up of a combination of fluvial sediments and consolidated terrain. During the Tertiary epoch, Marajó, Caviana and Mexiana were connected to each other and to the mainland, forming a wide interfluve between the Amazon and Tocantins rivers. The continuity of the Barreiras Formation along the three islands is evidence of this, as are some palaeochannels that form continuous lines between them. The islands became separated through tectonic action during the Flandrian transgression at the beginning of the Holocene, some 12,000 years ago.

Caviana is located in an area where the strong current of the Amazon River meets the opposing pressure of the Atlantic waters, causing extreme turbulence, erosion, landslides and sedimentation. This encounter of water currents causes a distinctive tidal bore, which is called the pororoca. Caviana is known as a place to observe the pororoca and for some to surf on it.

The dynamism of wind, tides and currents gives rise to frequent changes in the topography of the Amazon Delta. Shorelines can change due to rapid sedimentation and erosion processes, and islands can split up or join together. On Caviana, this can be noted through the names by which local inhabitants refer to certain parts of the island, such as Ilha Nova or Ilha da Prainha (ilha = island), indicating that that these areas have been separate islands in the past, but have joined up with Caviana at some point.

A dramatic example of this dynamism occurred between 1845 and 1850 when a particularly strong pororoca made a breach in Caviana's coast, which already had been heavily eroded. The flood waters followed the course of a stream called Igarapê Guajuru, widening it until they had split the island in two. The parts, which continue to be separated to the present day, are named as follows:

- The smaller part with an area of 687 km^{2} (265 sq mi) is called Inner or Northern Caviana (Caviana de Dentro or Caviana Setentrional)
- The larger part with an area of 2,257 km^{2} (871 sq mi) is called Outer or Southern Caviana (Caviana de Fora or Caviana Meridional).

== Nature ==
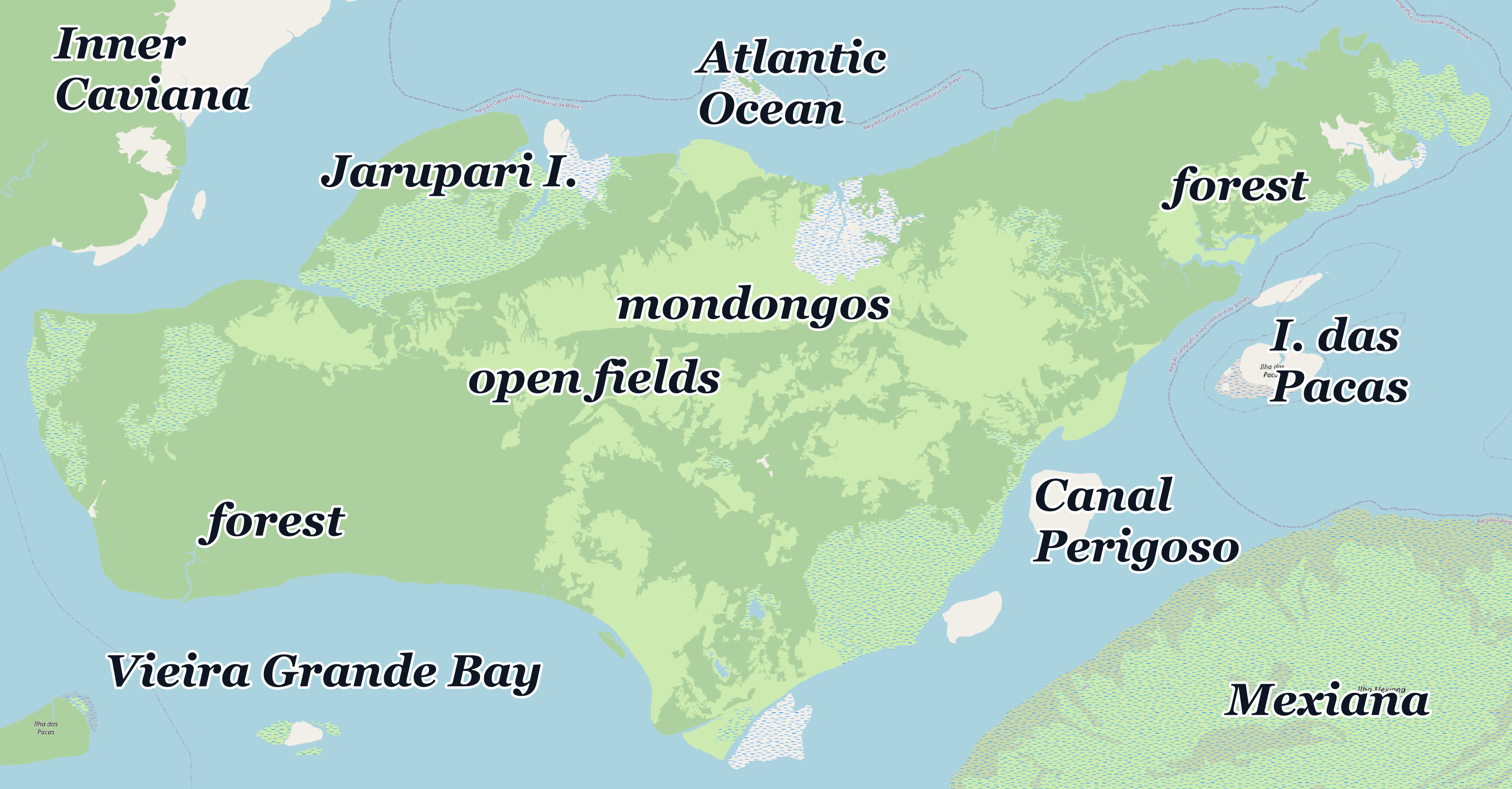
Natural features of Outer Caviana

Caviana is flat, marshy and frequently flooded, especially in the wet season that runs from January until May. Inner Caviana and the edges of Outer Caviana are covered with palm forest marshes that form part of the Marajó várzea biome. The centre of Outer Caviana is made up of mondongo swamp fields.

Caviana is a birdwatchers' haven. As many as 145 different species were observed here. The ornithologist Joseph B. Steere observed the birds on the island in 1871, specimens were brought to the University of Michigan Museum of Natural History.

The island is contained in the 59,985-square-kilometre (23,160 sq mi) Marajó Archipelago Environmental Protection Area, a sustainable-use conservation unit established in 1989 to protect the environment of the region.

== Archeology ==
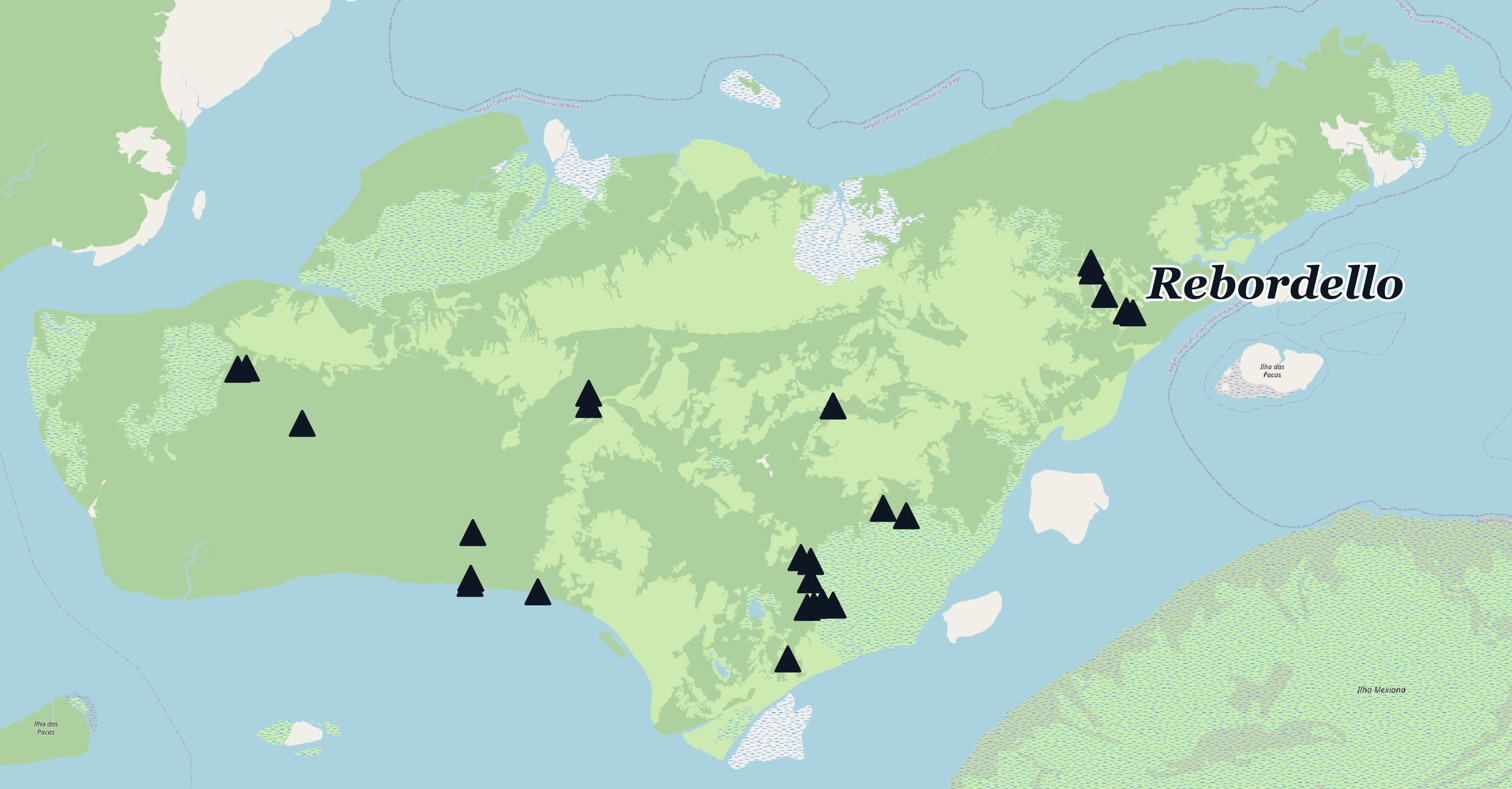
Map of Outer Caviana showing the location of archeological sites (tesos). The location of Rebordello has been labelled.

Caviana is of archeological significance. Excavations have been done on the island by Curt Nimuendajú in 1924–1925 and by Betty Meggers in 1948. All archeological sites are located on elevations in the landscape that are called tesos. Whether these elevations are natural or human-made is debated.

Evidence from these excavations suggests that the island was settled by indigenous groups in at least two phases. The first of these received the name "Caviana phase". The period in which these first groups settled on the island hasn't definitively been determined. Polychrome ceramics found from this phase are similar to those found in the north and south-east of the current state Amapá, suggesting this region as their origin.

The second phase of settlement, which extended into colonial times, is associated with the Aruã. Evidence found in the tesos indicates that they had much in common with other Arawak groups. This is apparent in the alignment of stones, polished statuettes, nephrite beads and amulets, ceramic figures, plates and roasters with dotted decoration. Findings in the tesos show that the Aruã practiced secondary burial in urns. Their cemeteries contain urns in different styles and also some glass beads and other European objects. This can indicate that Caviana was also inhabited by other groups, or that the Aruã traded intensively.

== History ==
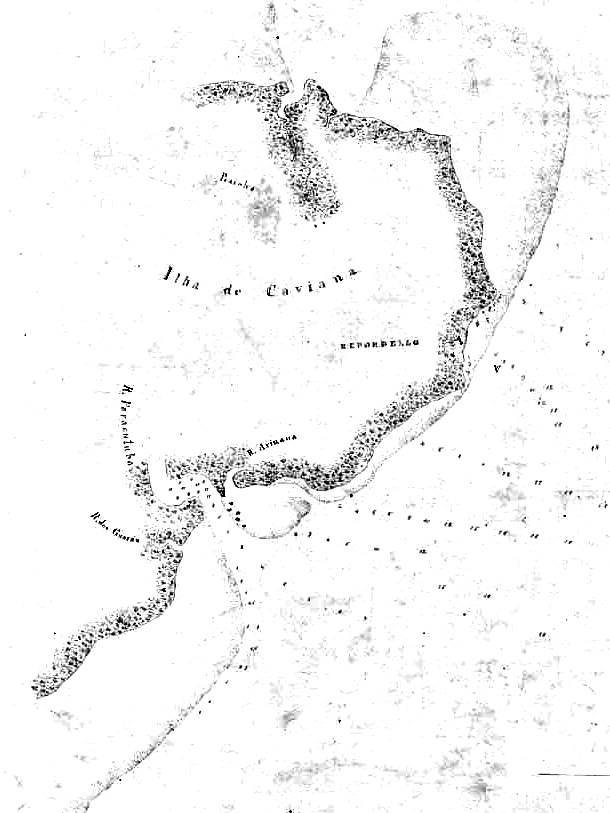
Map from 1854 of the port of Rebordello (then already abandoned)

In 17th and 18th Century, the Aruã made Caviana their stronghold. They called the island Uyruma, and lived mostly on its eastern coast. Their chief in the mid of the seventeenth century was called Piyé. They called their main settlement Piyé's Village (Aldeia de Piyé) after him, until it was renamed Rebordello by the Portuguese.

Chief Piyé was present when the Treaty of the Mapuá was signed, but he refused to swear an oath of obedience to the Kingdom of Portugal. Between 1725 and 1728, the Aruã repeatedly needed to defend themselves from attacks by the French together with an indigenous group from neighbouring island Mexiana under their leader Gaaimara. In 1760, the village was renamed Rebordello by the Portuguese missionary Antônio de Santo Agostinho. It had a mission post of the Order of Saint Anthony. In 1763 the village suffered a fire.

Aldeia de Piyé had been a great centre of Aruã culture, but after decades of harassment by the French and the Portuguese, most of them migrated. They first settled on Marajó, mainly in the basin of the Ganhoão River. Later, many moved to what is now Amapá and French Guiana. In 1816, there were still 279 Aruã living in Rebordello. Many left the area after the Revolt of the Cabanos between 1834 and 1836. When Nimuendajú visited the area around 1920, he counted three houses and a wooden chapel. In 2006, only parts of wooden fundaments and the ruins of a church could be found.

== Population ==
Currently, there are no larger settlements on Caviana. The fields in the east are occupied by water buffalo farms. Their owners mostly live in Belém, Chaves and Macapá. On the south-west there are communities of ribeirinhos, mostly living in stilt houses along the rivers and streams. They dedicate themselves to fishing and the collection of forest products. Each family manages a forest plot called the terreiro where they collect açaí, murumuru, buriti and pupunha, as well as various types of wood. In contrast to ribeirinhos in other parts of the Amazon area, they don't practice much agriculture.
