= Ganhoão River =

- Location within Brazil

Location
- Country: Brazil
- State: Pará

Physical characteristics
- Source
  - location: Mondongo swamps, Marajó
- Mouth
  - location: Atlantic Ocean
  - coordinates: 0°9′50″S 49°7′30″W

The Ganhoão River (Portuguese: Rio Ganhoão) is a river of Marajó, which itself is an island in the Amazon Delta. It is located in the state Pará in northern Brazil.

Its source is in the swamp areas called mondongos that are normally flooded during the wet season. It has an unobstructed entrance from the Atlantic Ocean but due to its sinuosity, it can only be navigated by small boats. There is a small island near its mouth that is also called Ganhoão.

The river is located in the municipality Chaves. The municipality maintains a register office on its bank. Artisanal fishing takes place on the river. Some communities near the river are Alto Ganhoão, Pompé, Redenção, Rio Jambu, Rio Seco, Vila Nazaré and Vila São Pedro. During the feast of Saint Sebastian, people go from house to house collecting gifts for the patron saint.

The area used to be inhabited by the Aruã, some of whom had fled from the island Caviana. They had a cemetery on a left tributary stream called Igarapé Bacabal. In 1702, the Portuguese moved a group of Aruã to the Urubu River in present-day state Amazonas.

== See also ==
- List of rivers of Pará
