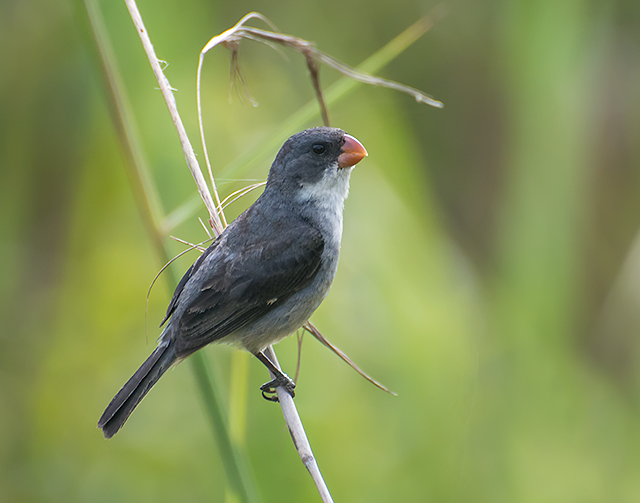
- Male
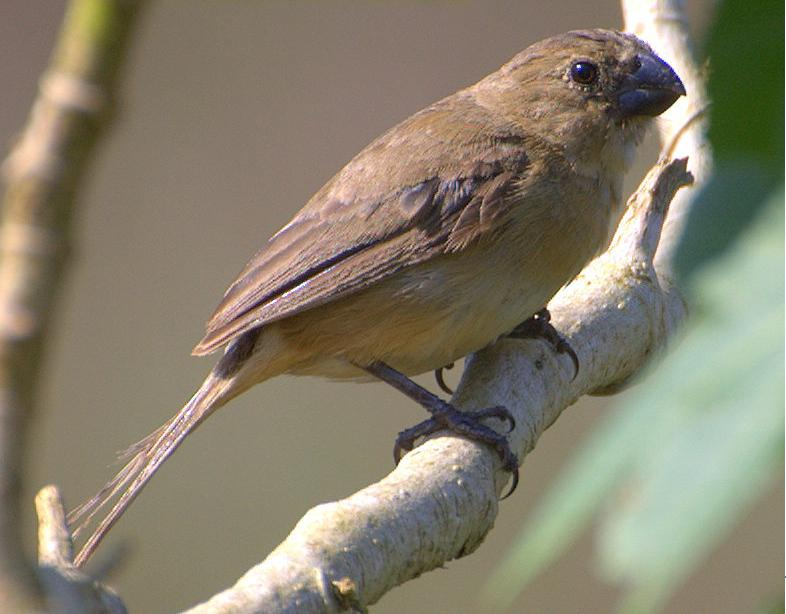
- Female

Conservation status
- Least Concern (IUCN 3.1)

Scientific classification
- Kingdom: Animalia
- Phylum: Chordata
- Class: Aves
- Order: Passeriformes
- Family: Thraupidae
- Genus: Sporophila
- Species: S. leucoptera

Binomial name
- Sporophila leucoptera (Vieillot, 1817)

= White-bellied seedeater =

Species of bird

The white-bellied seedeater (Sporophila leucoptera) is a species of bird in the family Thraupidae, the tanagers and allies. It is found regularly in Argentina, Bolivia, Brazil, Paraguay, and Suriname and as a vagrant in French Guiana, Peru, and Uruguay.

== Taxonomy and systematics ==
The white-bellied seedeater has a somewhat complicated taxonomic history. It was formally described in 1817 with the binomial Cocothraustes leucoptera By 1938 it had been reassigned to its present genus Sporophila, a genus in the family Emberizidae. Based on studies published between 1988 and 2011, beginning in 2012 Sporophila was moved to the tanager family Thraupidae.

The white-bellied seedeater has these four subspecies:

- S. l. mexianae Hellmayr, 1912
- S. l. cinereola (Temminck, 1820)
- S. l. leucoptera (Vieillot, 1817)
- S. l. bicolor (d'Orbigny & Lafresnaye, 1837)

During the twentieth century some authors treated S. l. bicolor as a full species. The Clements taxonomy recognizes some distinctions within the species, calling S. l. bicolor the "white-bellied seedeater (bicolored)" and grouping the other three as the "white-bellied seedeater (gray-backed)".

== Description ==
The white-bellied seedeater is 11 to 12.5 cm (4.3 to 4.9 in) long and weighs about 15 to 16 g (0.53 to 0.56 oz). It is a rather large seedeater with a longish tail. It has a very short, thick, bill with a rounded culmen. The species is sexually dimorphic. Adult males of the nominate subspecies S. l. leucoptera have a dark gray head that is slightly darker near the lores and a white throat and submoustachial area. Their upperparts are dark gray with a thin white band on the rump. Their tail is darker gray. Their wings are darker gray with white bases on the primaries that show as a patch on the closed wing. Their underparts are almost entirely white with slightly more grayish sides and flanks. Females have a warm tawny brown head, upperparts, wings, and tail. Their throat and belly are pale tawny brown and their breast and flanks intermediate between that and the upperparts' color.

The other subspecies of the white-bellied seedeater differ from the nominate and each other thus:

- S. l. mexianae: males have paler gray upperparts than nominate with no white rump band and entirely white (no gray) underparts
- S. l. cinereola: smaller than nominate; males have paler gray upperparts with no white rump band and more gray on the flanks
- S. l. bicolor: males are black where the other subspecies are gray; females have slightly browner upperparts and paler underparts than nominate.

Both sexes of all subspecies have a dark brown iris and blackish legs. Males have an orange-pink bill and females a blackish one.

== Distribution and habitat ==
The white-bellied seedeater has a disjunct distribution. The subspecies are found thus:

- S. l. mexianae: southern Suriname; separately in northern Brazil's southern Amapá state and Mexiana Island in northeastern Pará
- S. l. cinereola: eastern Brazil from central Maranhão east to Paraíba and south to Rio de Janeiro state
- S. l. leucoptera: central and southern Brazil from Goiás and Minas Gerais south to Mato Grosso and through Paraguay into northern Argentina as far as Santa Fe Province
- S. l. bicolor: northern and eastern Bolivia (but see below)

Some sources also include far southeastern Peru in the range of S. l. bicolor. However, as of 2010 it was known in that country only from a single sight record. The South American Classification Committee lists it as a vagrant to Peru. The committee also lists the species as a vagrant in French Guiana and Uruguay.

The white-bellied seedeater inhabits shrubby grasslands and adjacent forest edges, and always near water. In elevation it reaches 800 m (2,600 ft).

== Behavior ==
=== Movement ===
The white-bellied seedeater is mostly a sedentary year-round resident though there is evidence of some seasonal movements.

=== Feeding ===
The white-bellied seedeater feeds on grass seeds and those of other plants with some insects also in its diet. It feeds mostly while clinging to plant stems. It typically forages singly or in pairs and seldom in flocks.

=== Breeding ===
The white-bellied seedeater's breeding season has not been fully defined but includes November and December in eastern Brazil. Its nest is a cup made from grass roots and spider web, and is often lined with the white fluff of a Calotropis milkweed. It is typically near water in a shrub or tree between about 2.5 and 4.5 m (8 and 15 ft) above the ground. The clutch is two eggs that are white with black and brown spots. The female alone incubates and both parents provision nestlings. The incubation period and time to fledging are not known.

=== Vocalization ===
The nominate subspecies of the white-bellied seedeater sings "a repeated loud, ringing note, cleeuu cleeuu cleeuu cleeuu cleeuu" and also "single whistles rising in pitch". Subspecies S. l. bicolor has a song similar to the first of these and also "a less monotonous secondary song, piree pew puu pew puu piree pew puu". The species' call in jayip.

== Status ==
The IUCN has assessed the white-bellied seedeater as being of Least Concern. It has a very large range; its population size is not known but is believed to be stable. No immediate threats have been identified. It is considered "frequent to uncommon" in Brazil. "Many local populations have been extirpated because of intense commercial trapping and habitat loss, and this species may require a degree of monitoring."
