= Piie =

Piie may refer to:

- Piyé (indigenous leader), an indigenous leader in Pará, Brazil (also spelled Piié)
- Peterson Institute for International Economics, a think tank in the United States
