= Cururu River (Marajó) =

- Location within Brazil

Location
- Country: Brazil
- State: Pará

Physical characteristics
- Source
  - location: Mondongo swamps, Marajó
- Mouth
  - location: Anajás River
  - coordinates: 0°40′10″S 50°11′08″W

The Cururu River (Portuguese: Rio Cururu) is a river of Marajó, which itself is an island in the Amazon Delta. It is located in the state Pará in northern Brazil. Its source is in the swamp areas called mondongos that are normally flooded during the wet season. It is a right tributary of the Anajás River.

Eupsittula pertinax paraensis, a subspecies of the brown-throated parakeet, inhabits the basin of the Cururu.

== See also ==
- List of rivers of Pará
