= Fernão Carrilho =

Fernão Carrilho (ca. 1640 – ca. 1703) was an army officer and administrator in Colonial Brazil.

In 1676–77, he led an attack on the quilombo Palmares, during which its leader Ganga Zumba was wounded and some of his children and grandchildren were captured. He was captain-major of Ceará (when it was subordinate to Pernambuco) between 1693 and 1695, and in 1699.

He was governor of Maranhão from June 1701 to July 1702. During this time, he held various harassment campaigns against the Indigenous people on the island Marajó, including the Aruã.
