= Piyé (indigenous leader) =

Chief of the Aruã people

Piyé (also spelled Piié) was a chief of the Aruã people in the Amazon Delta in the seventeenth century. The Aruã were an indigenous nation that had its stronghold on the island Caviana. Their main village on the eastern coast of this island was referred to as Piyé's Village (Portuguese: Aldeia de Piyé) until it was renamed Rebordello in 1760.

Piyé was present when the Treaty of the Mapuá was sworn by indigenous leaders in front of Jesuit missionary António Vieira. He and his entourage must have travelled in canoes for day to reach this place. He was the only one mentioned by name in Vieira's writings about the treaty. In a letter to King Afonso VI of Portugal dated 11 February 1660, Vieira described Piyé as "the most intelligent of all" of those present at the ceremony. He became known mostly for refusing to swear an oath of obedience to the King of Portugal, arguing that since arriving in the region, it was the Portuguese who had been unfaithful to their King through their lack of friendship and obedience. In the present day, Piyé's refusal is still seen as an example of indigenous defiance.
