= Ponta de Pedras =

Municipality in Pará, Brazil

- Municipality
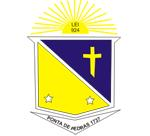
- Flag Coat of arms

- Location in the State of Pará

- Location within Brazil
- Coordinates: 01°23′24″S 48°52′15″W
- Country: Brazil
- Region: North
- State: Pará

Area
  - Total: 3,365.126 km^{2} (1,299.282 sq mi)
- Elevation: 10 m (33 ft)

Population (2020)
  - Total: 31,549
  - Density: 6/km^{2} (16/sq mi)
- Time zone: UTC−3 (BRT)
- Postal Code: 68830-000

Ponta de Pedras is a Brazilian municipality located in the state of Pará. Its population as of 2020 is estimated to be 31,549 people. The area of the municipality is 3,365.126 km^{2}. The city belongs to the mesoregion Marajó and to the microregion of Arari. The town of Ponta de Pedras is located on the Marajó-Açu River.

The municipality is contained in the 59,985-square-kilometre (23,160 sq mi) Marajó Archipelago Environmental Protection Area, a sustainable use conservation unit established in 1989 to protect the environment of the delta region.

== Notable people ==
- Dalcídio Jurandir (1909), novelist, winner of the Machado de Assis Prize

== See also ==
- List of municipalities in Pará
