= Lake Arari =

Lake in Pará, Brazil

- Lago Arari (Portuguese)
- Location within Brazil
- Location: Marajó
- Coordinates: 0°40′S 49°09′W
- Primary inflows: Jenipapucu River; Apeí River
- Primary outflows: Arari River
- Basin countries: Brazil
- Max. length: 18 kilometres (11 mi)
- Max. width: 7 kilometres (4.3 mi)
- Average depth: 2.5 metres (8.2 ft)
- Max. depth: 7 metres (23 ft)
- Settlements: Santa Cruz do Arari

Lake Arari (Portuguese: Lago Arari) is a lake of Marajó, which itself is an island in the Amazon Delta. It is located in the state Pará in northern Brazil, divided between the municipalities Cachoeira do Arari and Santa Cruz do Arari. Slightly to the north-east lies Lake Guajará.

Lake Arari has an ellipsoid shape, oriented in the north-south direction. The lake can be considered the largest depression on the island Marajó. Geological surveys identify it as the remainder of a much larger lake that existed in the past.

The waters of the lake are generally muddy in the dry season. During the wet season, the area and depth of the lake change considerably because of intensive flooding of the surrounding areas. The waters become more clear and the lake is visited by boto dolphins, manatees and piracuru fish. Caimans, snakes and poraquê electric eels can also be found, as well as various types of birds, such as scarlet ibises and herons.

The lake is fed in the north by the Jenipapucu River and the Apeí River. The Jenipapucu River connects the lake to the Tartarugas River. It is often clogged by German grass and water hyacinths, making the passage of boats difficult. The Arari River drains the lake in the south.

The lake is contained in the 59,985 square kilometres (23,160 sq mi) Marajó Archipelago Environmental Protection Area, a sustainable-use conservation unit established in 1989 to protect the environment of the region.
