= Anajás =

Municipality in Pará, Brazil

- Municipality
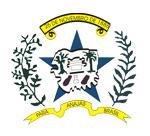
- Flag Coat of arms

- Location in the State of Pará
- Coordinates: 00°59′13″S 49°56′24″W
- Country: Brazil
- Region: North
- State: Pará

Area
  - Total: 6,921.709 km^{2} (2,672.487 sq mi)
- Elevation: 10 m (33 ft)

Population (2020)
  - Total: 29,688
  - Density: 3.1/km^{2} (8.0/sq mi)
- Time zone: UTC−3 (BRT)
- Postal Code: 68810-000

Anajás (/ænəˈʒɑːs/ ana-ZHAS) is a Brazilian municipality located in the state of Pará. Its population as of 2020 is estimated to be 29,688 people. The area of the municipality is 6,921.709 km^{2}. The city belongs to the mesoregion Marajó and to the microregion of Furos de Breves.

The municipality is contained in the 59,985-square-kilometre (23,160 sq mi) Marajó Archipelago Environmental Protection Area, a sustainable use conservation unit established in 1989 to protect the environment of the delta region.

== See also ==
- List of municipalities in Pará
