= Soure, Pará =

Soure
- Municipality
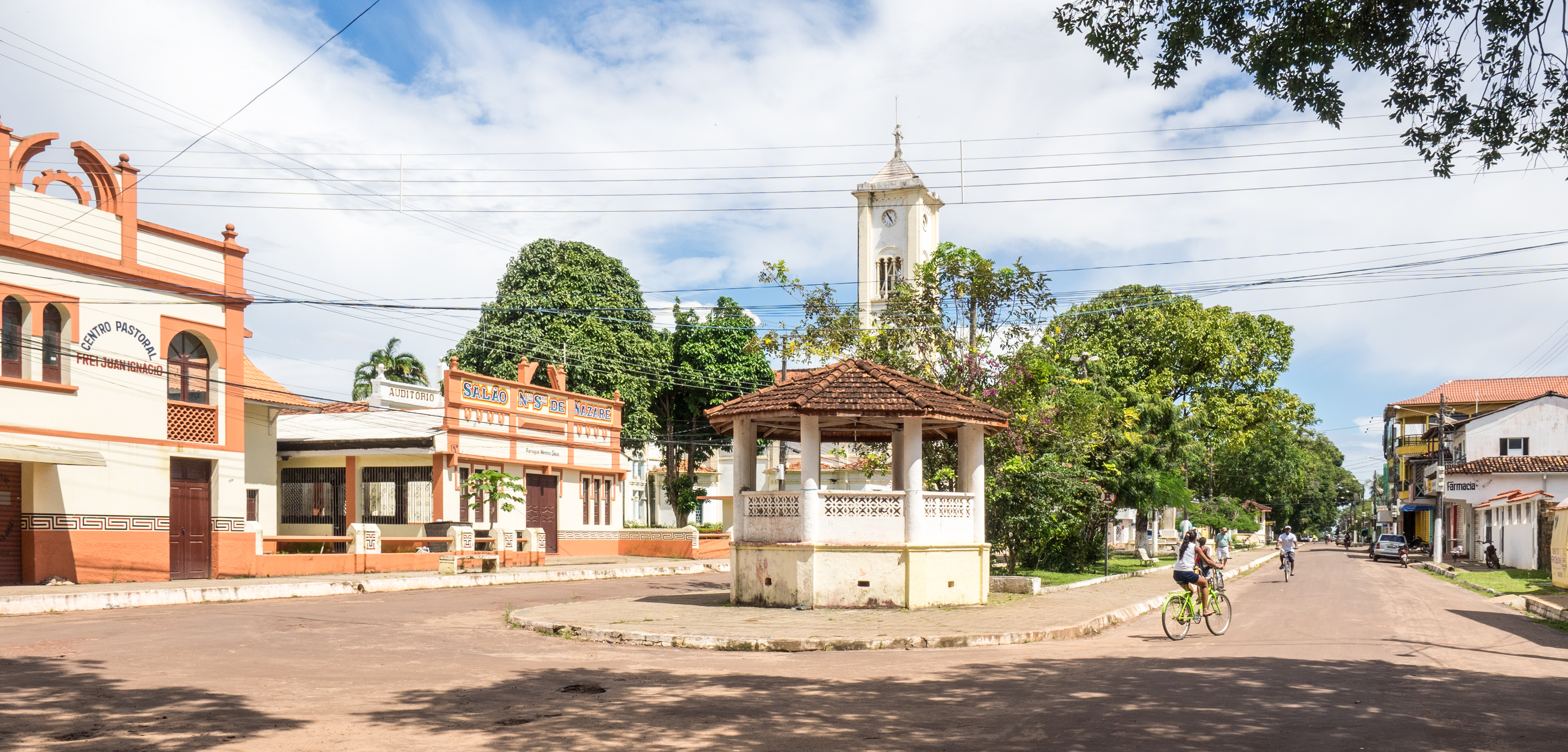
- Street in Soure, 2015

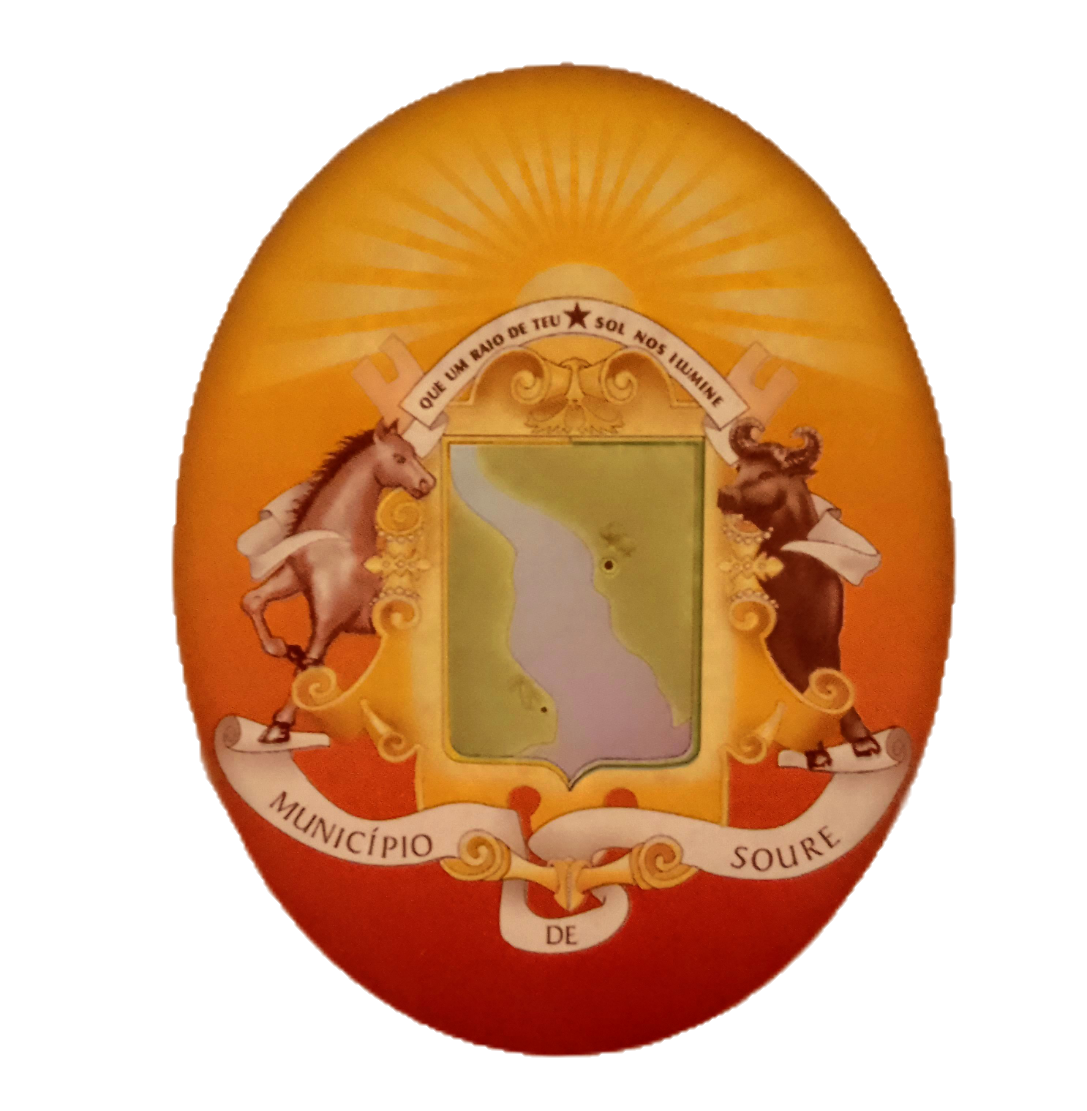
- Flag Coat of arms

- Location in the State of Pará
- Coordinates: 00°43′01″S 48°31′22″W
- Country: Brazil
- Region: North
- State: Pará

Area
  - Total: 3,512.863 km^{2} (1,356.324 sq mi)
- Elevation: 10 m (33 ft)

Population (2020)
  - Total: 25,565
  - Density: 6.2/km^{2} (16/sq mi)
- Time zone: UTC−3 (BRT)
- Postal Code: 68870-000

Soure is a Brazilian municipality located in the northern state of Pará, on the island of Marajó, which is located in the Amazon River at its mouth. Its population as of 2020 is estimated to be 25,565 people. The area of the municipality is 3,512.863 km^{2}. The city belongs to the mesoregion Marajó and to the microregion of Arari.

The Cambu River runs through the municipality for most of its course. The Tartarugas River forms the border with the municipality of Chaves.

The municipality is contained in the 59,985-square-kilometre (23,160 sq mi) Marajó Archipelago Environmental Protection Area, a sustainable use conservation unit established in 1989 to protect the environment of the delta region. It contains the 27,464-hectare (67,870-acre) Soure Marine Extractive Reserve, a sustainable use conservation area created in 2001 that protects the coastal mangroves to the north of the municipal seat and along the north part of the Paracauari River.

== Notable people ==
- Ildemar Alcântara, Brazilian mixed martial artist, former UFC fighter and younger brother of Iuri Alcântara.
- Iuri Alcântara, Brazilian mixed martial artist, UFC fighter and older brother of Ildemar Alcântara.
- Deiveson Figueiredo, Brazilian mixed martial artist, UFC fighter, former two-time UFC Flyweight Champion.
- Zélia Amador, first black woman to be a vice-rector of a Brazilian university. Black rights activist.

== Climate ==
Soure has a tropical monsoon climate (Köppen: Am), with different amounts of precipitation depending on the season.

Climate data for Soure (1981–2010)
| Month | Jan | Feb | Mar | Apr | May | Jun | Jul | Aug | Sep | Oct | Nov | Dec | Year |
|---|---|---|---|---|---|---|---|---|---|---|---|---|---|
| Mean daily maximum °C (°F) | 30.3 (86.5) | 29.9 (85.8) | 29.9 (85.8) | 30.3 (86.5) | 31.0 (87.8) | 31.4 (88.5) | 31.3 (88.3) | 31.3 (88.3) | 31.6 (88.9) | 31.9 (89.4) | 32.0 (89.6) | 31.5 (88.7) | 31.0 (87.8) |
| Daily mean °C (°F) | 27.0 (80.6) | 26.6 (79.9) | 26.5 (79.7) | 26.8 (80.2) | 27.3 (81.1) | 27.5 (81.5) | 27.5 (81.5) | 27.9 (82.2) | 28.3 (82.9) | 28.5 (83.3) | 28.6 (83.5) | 28.1 (82.6) | 27.6 (81.7) |
| Mean daily minimum °C (°F) | 24.3 (75.7) | 23.9 (75.0) | 23.9 (75.0) | 24.0 (75.2) | 24.4 (75.9) | 24.5 (76.1) | 24.5 (76.1) | 25.0 (77.0) | 25.6 (78.1) | 25.8 (78.4) | 25.9 (78.6) | 25.5 (77.9) | 24.8 (76.6) |
| Average precipitation mm (inches) | 456.8 (17.98) | 537.6 (21.17) | 647.2 (25.48) | 561.5 (22.11) | 319.3 (12.57) | 185.8 (7.31) | 138.6 (5.46) | 79.3 (3.12) | 15.9 (0.63) | 14.6 (0.57) | 28.5 (1.12) | 150.5 (5.93) | 3,135.6 (123.45) |
| Average precipitation days (≥ 1.0 mm) | 19 | 22 | 25 | 24 | 20 | 16 | 14 | 8 | 2 | 2 | 2 | 7 | 161 |
| Average relative humidity (%) | 83.9 | 86.8 | 87.4 | 87.5 | 84.9 | 81.8 | 80.4 | 78.0 | 74.9 | 73.9 | 74.5 | 77.9 | 81.0 |
| Mean monthly sunshine hours | 143.3 | 98.2 | 93.3 | 107.4 | 163.2 | 222.4 | 255.2 | 277.0 | 269.0 | 273.7 | 252.5 | 219.0 | 2,374.2 |
Source 1: Instituto Nacional de Meteorologia
Source 2: NOAA
