= Mexiana =

- Mexiana on a WorldWind satellite image from 1990

- Location within Brazil

Geography
- Location: Pará State, Brazil
- Coordinates: 0°2′S 49°35′W
- Archipelago: Marajó Archipelago
- Area: 1,543 km^{2} (596 sq mi)
- Length: 64 km (39.8 mi)
- Width: 28 km (17.4 mi)

Administration
- Brazil
- State: Pará
- Municipality: Chaves

Mexiana (Portuguese: Ilha Mexiana [ˈiʎɐ meʃiˈɐnɐ]) is a coastal island in the Brazilian state of Pará. The island is part of the municipality of Chaves. The Equator runs through the island.

Mexiana is located where the Amazon River flows into the Atlantic Ocean. It is separated from the island Marajó by the Canal Sul (South Channel) of this river and from neighbouring island Caviana by the Canal Perigoso ("Dangerous Channel"). The latter is called such because sandbanks make navigation perilous during low tides.

In the early 18th century, the leader of the indigenous groups living on Caviana was called Gaaimara. Between 1725 and 1728, they repeatedly attacked the Aruã on neighbouring Caviana together with the French.

In the 19th century, the island was in the possession of the Pombo family, which originated from the Kingdom of Galicia. Started from the middle of that century, they used it for the extraction of rubber. Around the same time, Mexiana was visited by the English naturalist Alfred Russel Wallace. He wrote about the occurrence of slavery on the island, as well as about the abundance of large mammals. The native peccaries however were already extinct on Mexiana a century earlier.

Among the fauna present on the island are the scaled spinetail and the maguari stork. The island is contained in the 59,985-square-kilometre (23,160 sq mi) Marajó Archipelago Environmental Protection Area, a sustainable-use conservation unit established in 1989 to protect the environment of the region.
