= Chaves, Pará =

Chaves
- Municipality
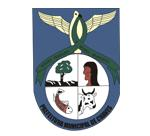
- Flag Coat of arms

- Location in the State of Pará

- Location within Brazil
- Coordinates: 00°09′36″S 49°59′16″W
- Country: Brazil
- Region: North
- State: Pará

Area
  - Total: 13,084.879 km^{2} (5,052.100 sq mi)
- Elevation: 6 m (20 ft)

Population (2020)
  - Total: 23,948
  - Density: 1.3/km^{2} (3.4/sq mi)
- Time zone: UTC−3 (BRT)
- Postal Code: 68880-000

Chaves is a Brazilian municipality located in the state of Pará. Its population as of 2020 is estimated to be 23,948 people. The area of the municipality is 13,084.879 km^{2}. The city belongs to the mesoregion Marajó and to the microregion of Arari.

Chaves is located on the island Marajó in the mouth of the Amazon River. A number of islands are part of the municipality, the largest of which are Caviana and Mexiana. The Tartarugas River forms the border with the municipality of Soure.

The municipality is contained in the 59,985-square-kilometre (23,160 sq mi) Marajó Archipelago Environmental Protection Area, a sustainable use conservation unit established in 1989 to protect the environment of the delta region.

In the 17th and 18th Century, the area was inhabited by the Aruã, mainly around the Ganhoão River. Most of them migrated to Amapá and French Guiana after the Treaty of the Mapuá. In 1793, the Portuguese transferred the ones who had stayed to the lower Tocantins River. On the coast of Chaves, ceramic fragments related to them could still be found, but the advance of the Vieira Grande Bay washed them away.

== See also ==
- List of municipalities in Pará
