= Cachoeira do Arari =

- Municipality
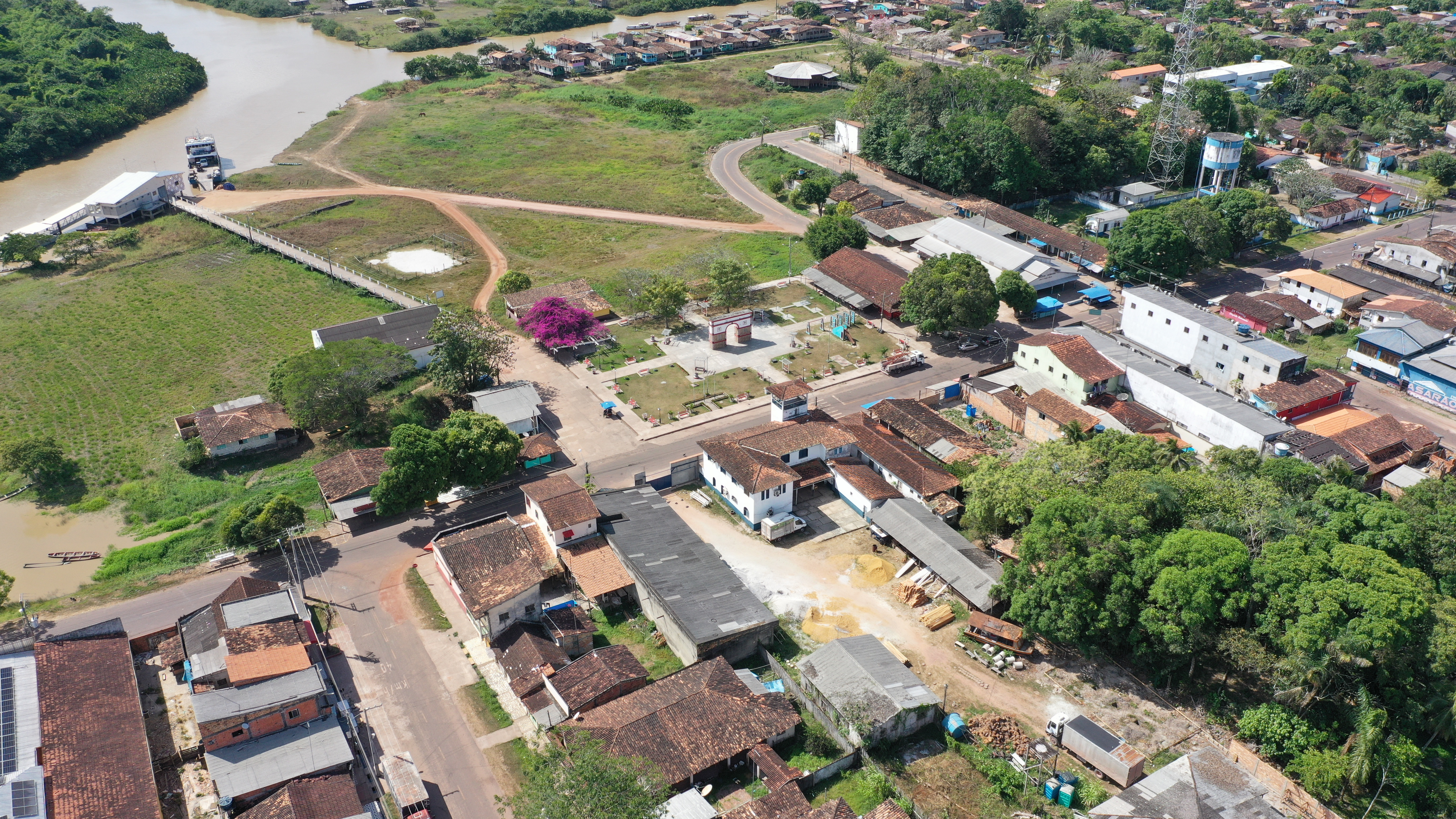

- Flag

- Location in the State of Pará
- Coordinates: 01°00′39″S 48°57′46″W
- Country: Brazil
- Region: North
- State: Pará

Area
  - Total: 3,102.080 km^{2} (1,197.720 sq mi)
- Elevation: 2 m (6.6 ft)

Population (2020)
  - Total: 24,064
  - Density: 5.7/km^{2} (15/sq mi)
- Time zone: UTC−3 (BRT)
- Postal Code: 68840-000

Cachoeira do Arari is a Brazilian municipality located in the state of Pará. Its population as of 2020 is estimated to be 24,064 people. The area of the municipality is 3,102.080 km^{2}. The city belongs to the mesoregion Marajó and to the microregion of Arari. The town of Cachoeira do Arari is located on the Arari River.

Cachoeira do Arari is the location of the Museum of the Marajó, founded in 1972 by the Catholic priest and museologician Giovanni Gallo.

The Cambu River has its source in the municipality.

The municipality is contained in the 59,985-square-kilometre (23,160 sq mi) Marajó Archipelago Environmental Protection Area, a sustainable use conservation unit established in 1989 to protect the environment of the delta region.

== See also ==
- List of municipalities in Pará
