= Marajó =

Island in Pará, Brazil

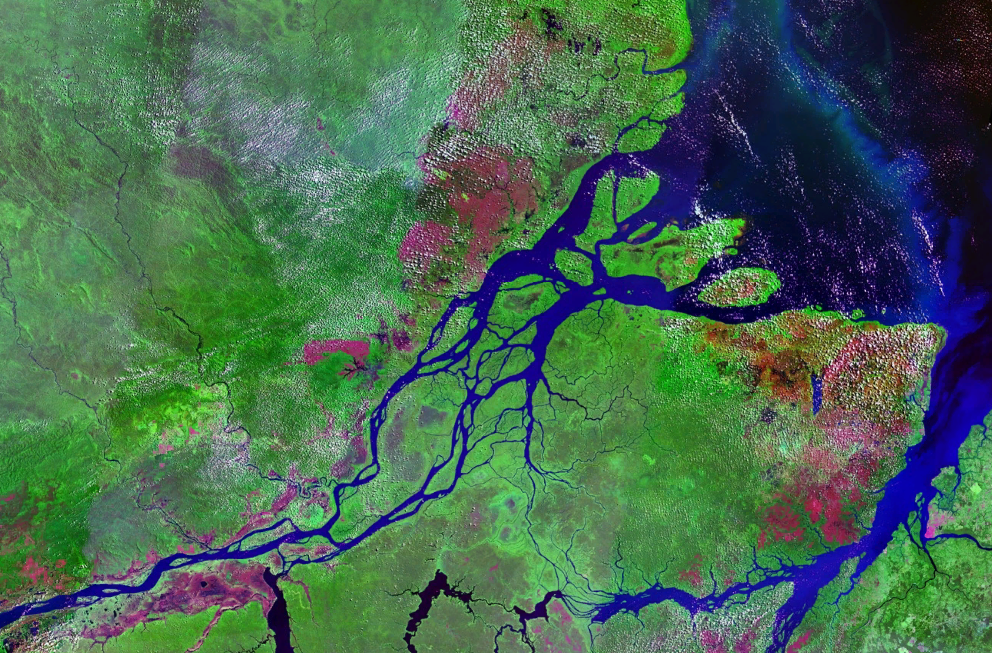
- Satellite view of Marajó Island

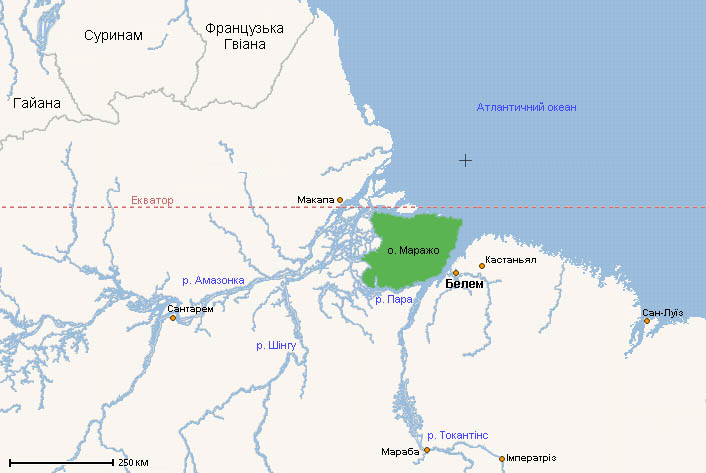
- Location of Marajó in the Amazon Delta

- Location within Brazil

Geography
- Location: Pará, Brazil
- Coordinates: 0°59′S 49°35′W
- Archipelago: Marajó Archipelago
- Area: 40,100 km^{2} (15,500 sq mi)
- Area rank: 35th
- Length: 297 km (184.5 mi)
- Width: 204 km (126.8 mi)
- Highest elevation: 40 m (130 ft)
- Highest point: Breves (city)

Administration
- Brazil
- State: Pará
- Macroregion: Marajó
- Largest settlement: Breves (pop. 99,223)

Demographics
- Population: 402,290 (2015)

Marajó (/ˌmærəˈʒoʊ/ MARR-ə-ZHOH; Brazilian Portuguese: [maɾaˈʒɔ]) is a large coastal island in Pará, Brazil. It is the main and largest of the islands in the Marajó Archipelago. Marajó Island is separated from the mainland by Marajó Bay, Pará River, smaller rivers (especially Macacos and Tajapuru), Companhia River, Jacaré Grande River, Vieira Grande Bay and the Atlantic Ocean.

From approximately 400 BC to 1600 AD, Marajó was the site of an advanced pre-Cabraline society called the Marajoara culture, which may have numbered more than 100,000 people at its peak. Today, the island is known for its large water buffalo population, as well as the pororoca tidal bore periodically exhibited by high tides overcoming the usual complex hydrodynamic interactions in the surrounding rivers. It is the second-largest island in South America, and the 35th largest island in the world.

With a land area of 40,100 square kilometres (15,500 mi^{2}) Marajó is comparable in size to Switzerland. Its maximum span is 295 kilometres (183 mi) long and 200 kilometres (120 mi) in perpendicular width.

== Geography ==
=== Location ===
Marajó Island is surrounded by the following waters, which separate it from the mainland:

- North: Vieira Grande Bay, the South Canal of the Amazon Delta (which separates Marajó from the island Mexiana) and the Atlantic Ocean
- East: Marajó Bay
- South: the headwaters of the Pará River and the Tocantins River
- West: the Jacaré Grande River and the Companhia River, as well as a complex set of river channels called furos, including the Macacos River Channel and the Tajapuru River Channel

The island is situated just south of the Equator. Its Northern cost, which runs almost parallel to it, is called Contracosta. Due to its location at the mouth of the Amazon River, archeologist Helen Palmatary compared the island to "an egg in the mouth of a snake".

Together with smaller neighboring islands that are separated from Marajó by rivers, they form the Marajó Archipelago, with an aggregate area of 49,602 square kilometres (19,151 mi^{2}). The archipelago is contained in the 59,985 square kilometres (23,160 sq mi) Marajó Archipelago Environmental Protection Area, a sustainable-use conservation unit established in 1989 to protect the environment of the region.

The island is known for the pororoca, a tidal bore phenomenon in the river that creates large waves reaching 4 m (13 ft) in height. It is a tourist destination, especially for surfing of the bore.

=== Ecology ===
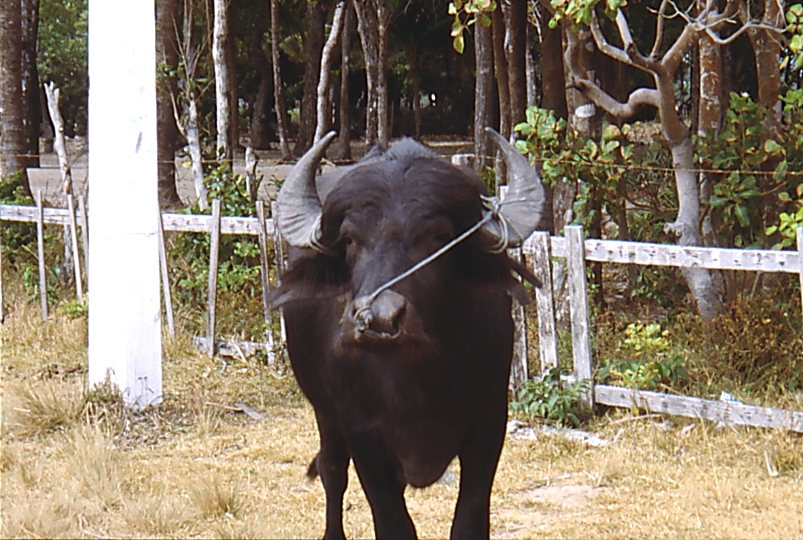
Water buffalo on Marajó

Marajó is almost entirely flat. The island can be divided into the eastern side with savanna plains at a slightly higher elevation of around 6 metres (20 ft), and the western side with rainforest situated around sea level. On the savannas, there are large fazendas with animal husbandry. There are large herds of domesticated water buffalo, which are technically invasive to the island; they now number about 450,000, higher than the island's human population. The western side of the island is characterized by várzea forests and small farms. Lumber and açaí palm are produced there.

The island is in the Marajó várzea ecoregion, an area of seasonally and tidally flooded várzea forest.

To the north of the large savanna area are palm swamps called mondongos, mainly with Buriti Palm (Mauritia flexuosa) and Euterpe oleracea. During the rainy season, the swamps are flooded one meter high. Little is known about the ecology of these swamps.

=== Hydrology ===
Itself an island in the delta of the Amazon River, Marajó is crossed by numerous rivers. They form the principal mode of transport for the island's inhabitants. The main ones are listed here:

- Afuá River
- Anabiju River
- Anajás River
- Aramá River
- Arapixi River
- Arari River
- Atuá River
- Cajari River
- Cajuúna River
- Camará River
- Cambu River
- Canaticu River
- Furo Charapucu
- Cururu River
- Ganhoão River
- Guajará River
- Jenipapucu River
- Mapuá River
- Marajó-Açu River
- Marajozinho River
- Moções River
- Muaná River
- Mucutá River
- Mutuacá River
- Paracauari River
- Piriá River
- Pracuúba River
- Tartarugas River

Marajó is largely flooded during the rainy season because of higher water levels of the rivers along its coast and heavy rainfall in its interior. During this season, much of the island presents itself as a large lake. This is also the location of Lake Arari, which has an area of 400 square kilometres (150 mi^{2}), but shrinks by 80% during the dry season. Another lake is Lake Guajará. Because of the changing water levels and regular seasonal flooding, many settlements on Marajó are built on stilts (palafitas). This is especially visible in the town of Afuá, where the stilt houses and the reliance on boat transport gave rise to the epithet "The Venice of Marajó".

There have been several plans for canals on the island, to connect the various rivers for transportation and to facilitate draining after each year's floading. Tartarugas River has been partially canalised to create a connection between Lake Arari and the Atlantic Ocean. This stretch is called the Tartarugas Canal (Canal Tartarugas). Since the 1980s, there have been plans for canals to connect the Anajás River to the Atuá River or its tributary the Anabiju to facilitate transport between Belém and Macapá, but these haven't materialised.

=== Municipalities ===
The most important towns are in the southeastern portion of the island: Soure, Salvaterra, and the largest city, Breves. They feature a basic touristic infrastructure and are popular because of the generous, lightly populated beaches. The city of Soure, on the island's Atlantic coast, serves as an entry point to the island via its ferry link to Belém.

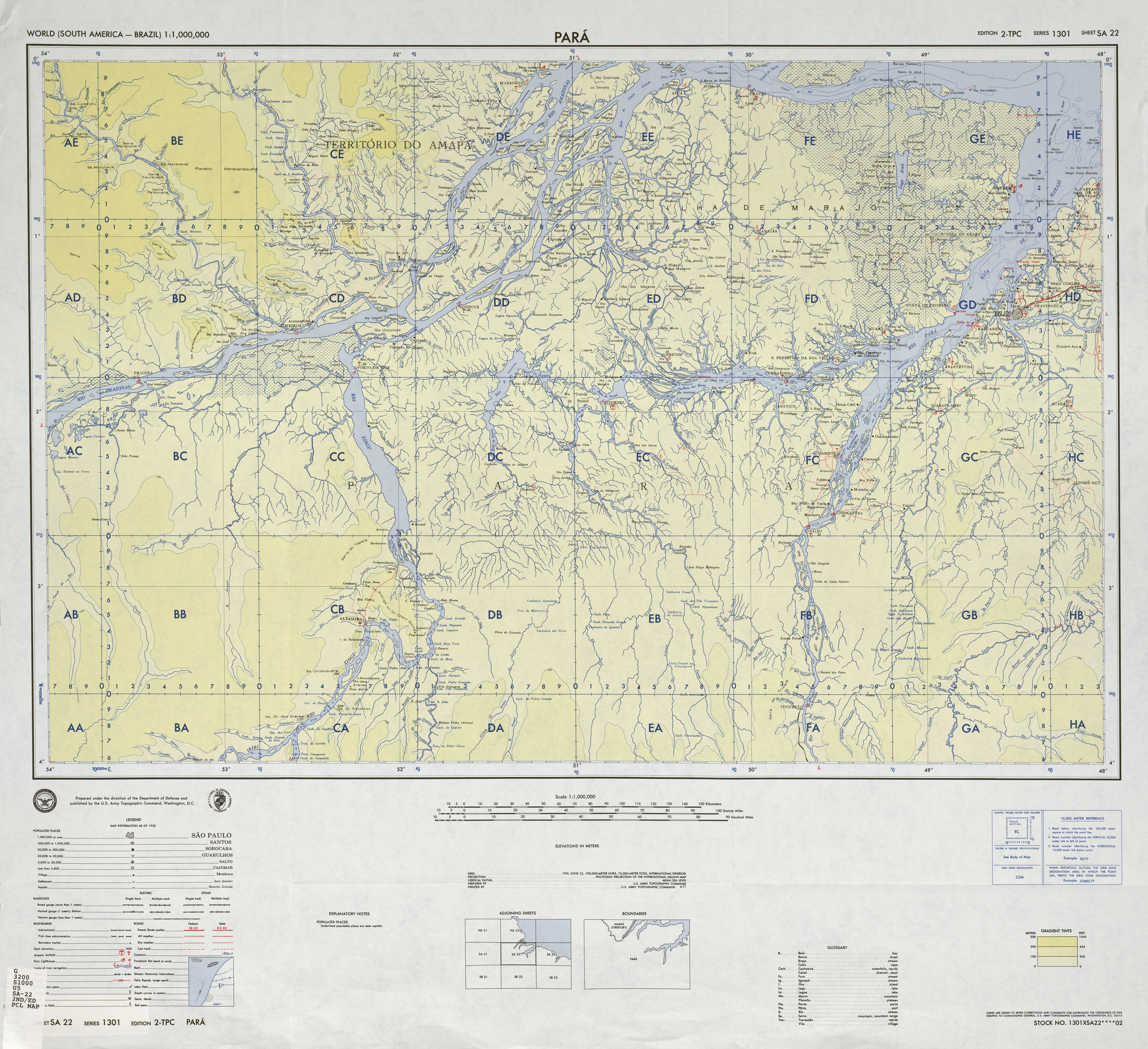
Marajó Island map

The island is shared by 16 municipalities of three microregions:

- Microregion of Arari:
  - Cachoeira do Arari
  - Chaves
  - Muaná
  - Ponta de Pedras
  - Salvaterra
  - Santa Cruz do Arari
  - Soure
- Microregion of Furos de Breves:
  - Afuá
  - Anajás
  - Breves
  - Curralinho
  - São Sebastião da Boa Vista
- Microregion of Portel:
  - Bagre
  - Gurupá
  - Melgaço
  - Portel

== History ==
Marajoara culture
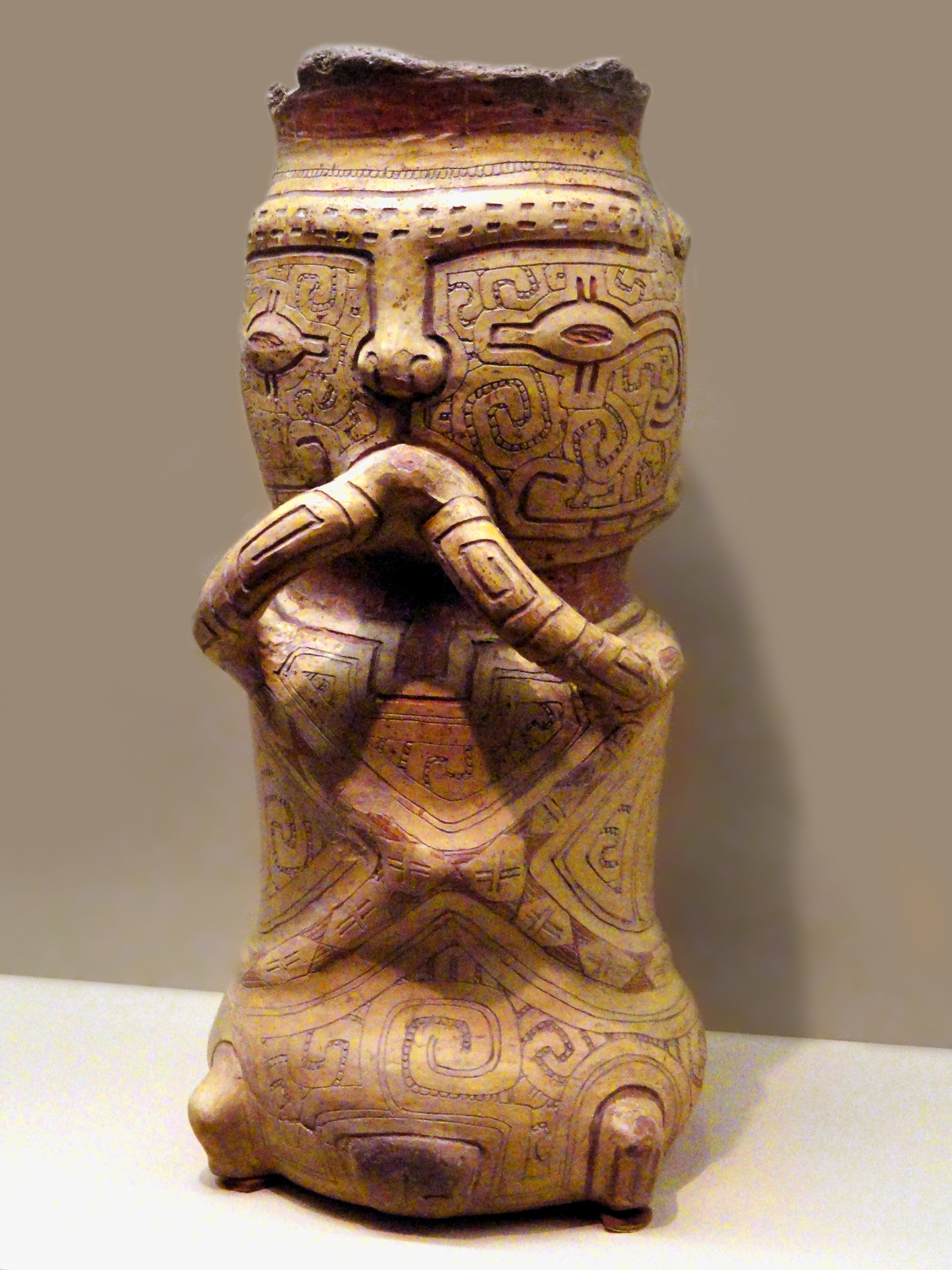
Burial urn, American Museum of Natural History

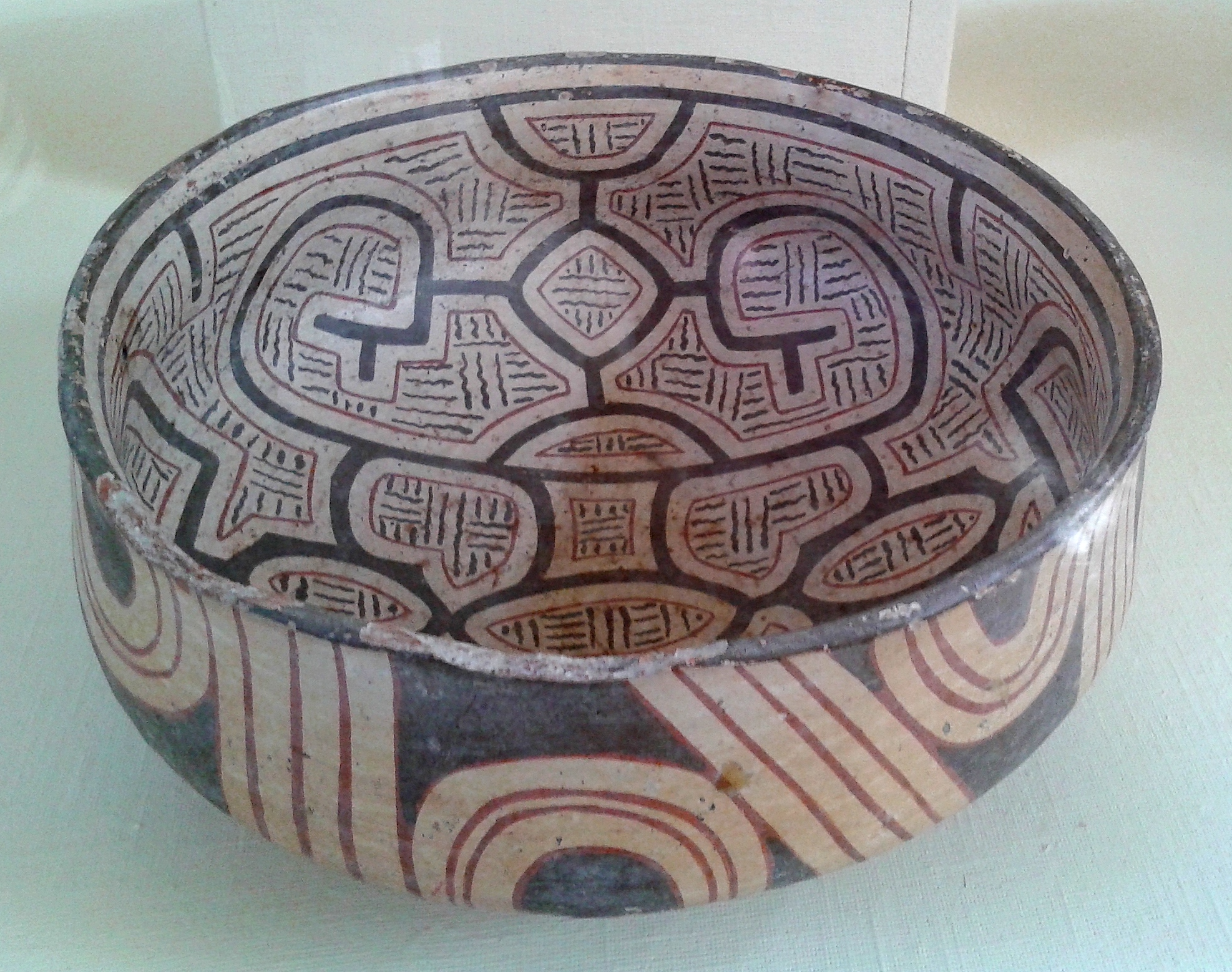
Marajoara bowl, Museu Nacional

The island was the site of an advanced pre-Cabraline society, the Marajoara culture, which existed from approximately 400 BC to 1600 AD. The island has been a center of archaeological exploration and scholarship since the nineteenth century. Scholars from the 1980s forward have divided the pre-Cabraline period into the Ananatuba phase (c. 1100 – c. 200 BC), the Mangueiras phase (c. 1000 BC – c. 100 AD), the Formiga phase (c. 100-400 AD), the Marajoará phase (c. 400-1200 AD), and the Aruã phase (1200-1500 AD).

Since the 1990s, there has been debate over the origins and sophistication of Marajó's pre-Cabraline society. Based on fieldwork in the 1940s and 1950s, the archaeologist Betty Meggers initially argued that the Marajoara culture had been founded by emigrants from the Andes and that the society steadily declined until its final collapse at approximately 1400 AD, due to the Marajó's poor soil fertility and other environmental factors. Megger's hypotheses subsequently became associated with environmental determinism. Her theory has since been rejected, however, by the archaeologist Anna Curtenius Roosevelt, who re-excavated Marajó in the 1980s. According to Roosevelt, the Marajoara culture developed independently within the Amazon and featured both intensive subsistence agriculture and major public works.

Roosevelt estimated that Marajó may have had a population of more than 100,000 people at its peak. The population lived in homes with tamped earth floors, organized themselves into matrilineal clans, and divided tasks by sex, age, and skill level.

The arrival of Europeans in the sixteenth century was catastrophic to the indigenous population of the island; 90% died due to high mortality from Eurasian infectious diseases; they lacked immunity against these diseases that had become endemic in Eurasian cities.

In contrast, however, during the 1918–1919 pandemic worldwide of Spanish influenza, Marajó was the only major populated area not to have any documented cases of the illness.

The island is also the location of the Roman Catholic Territorial Prelature of Marajó.

== See also ==
- Anaja people
- Teso dos Bichos (archeological site)
