= Marajó Bay =

Bay of the Atlantic Ocean off Brazil

Coordinates: 1.03°S 48.49°W

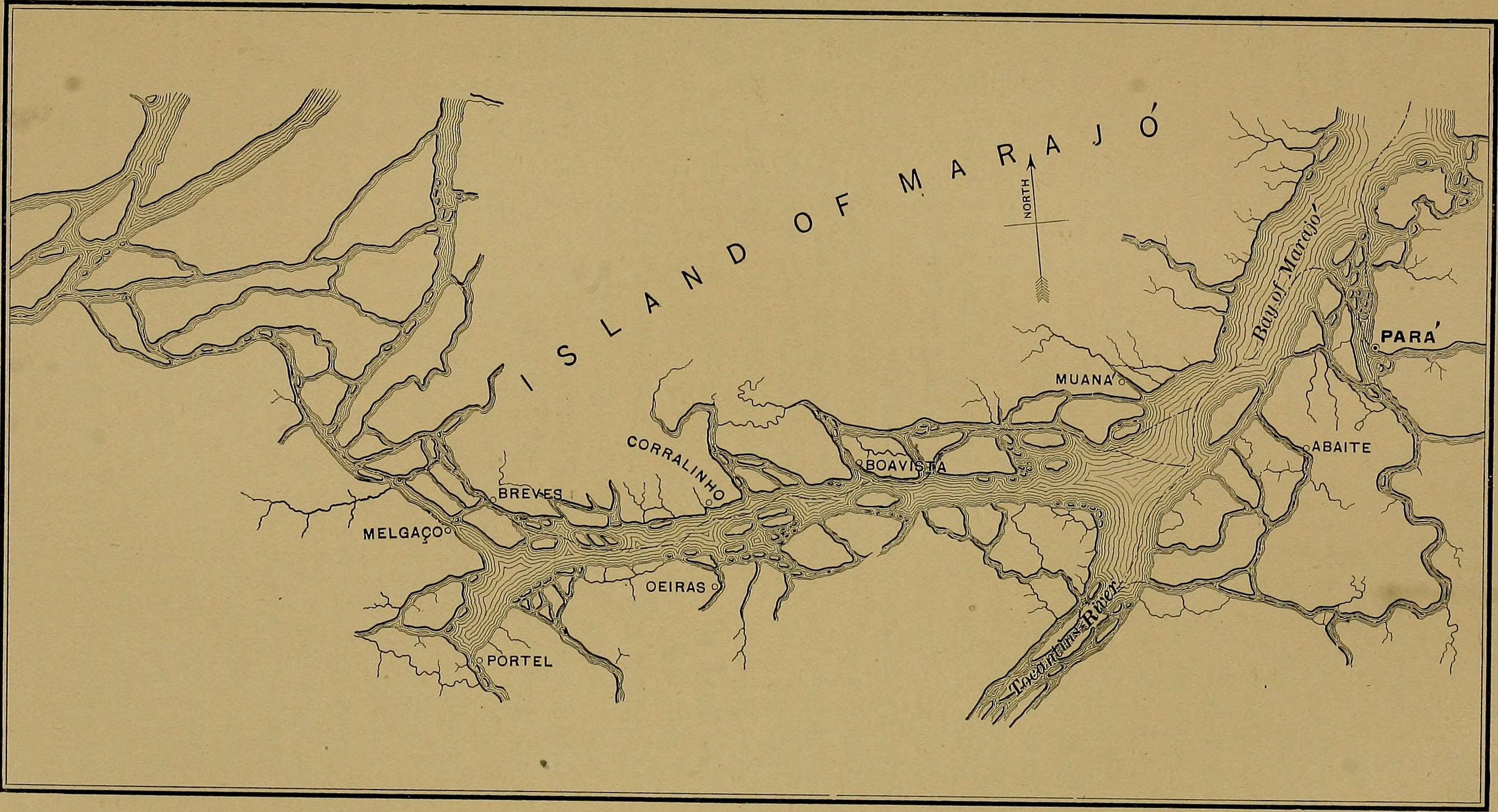
1895 map describes Marajó Bay on the right

Marajó Bay, the Marajoara Gulf or the Amazon Gulf, is a recessed body of water of the Brazilian coast located in the state of Pará. It is roughly 4,500 km^{2} (1,700 sq mi) in size, and is a receptacle for the waters of the Pará River distributary channel, the waters of the Tocantins basin and the waters of the Guajará Bay, serving as the eastern aquatic border of both the Marajó Island and the Marajó Archipelago. Marajó Bay is an estuary consisting of both salt and fresh water, resulting in the classification of an estuarine system. Marajó Bay also receives sediments from the Amazon River through the Breves Channel as well as the Pará River, causing the water to be turbid.

The Pará River and a small fraction of the Tocantins River are the main providers of water for Marajó Bay. The river is vital to the surrounding areas and makes different areas and ports very accessible for locals. The river also eventually clashes with salt water from the Atlantic Ocean in the Marajó Bay. A circulation process of salinity, temperature, and tidal range in the two different water types occurs in the bay as they meet. Salt water concentrations are also impacted by low water periods of the Amazon River.

== Ecology ==
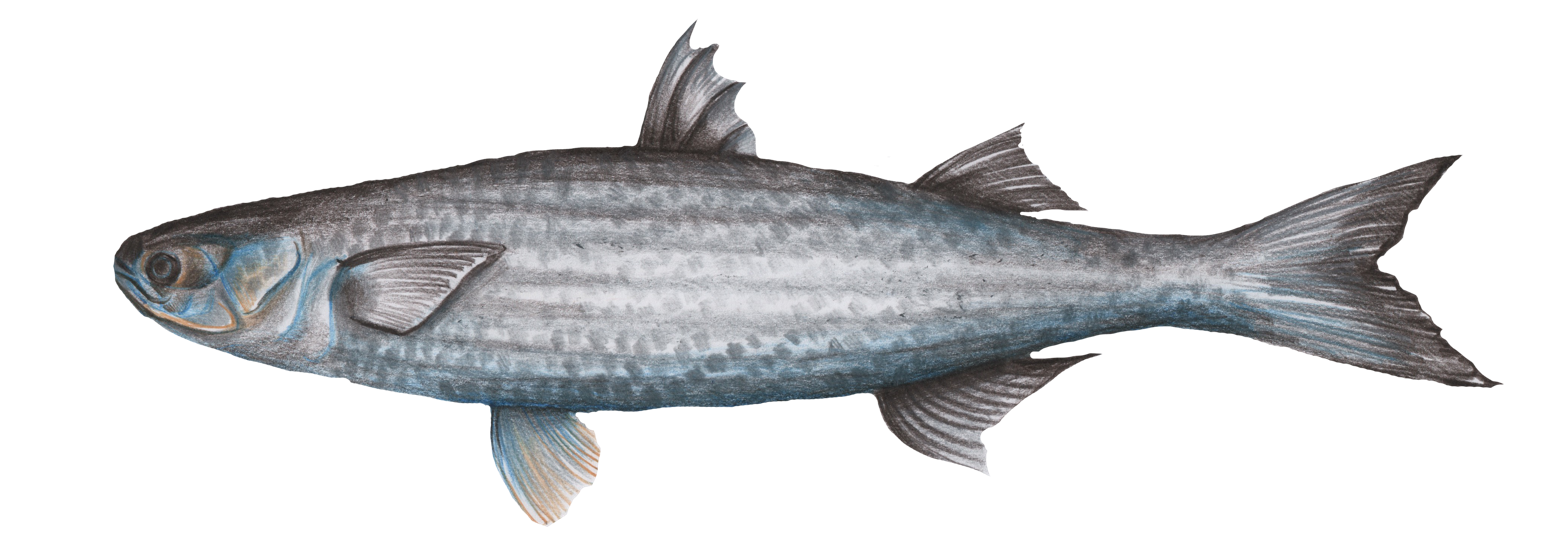
Mugil

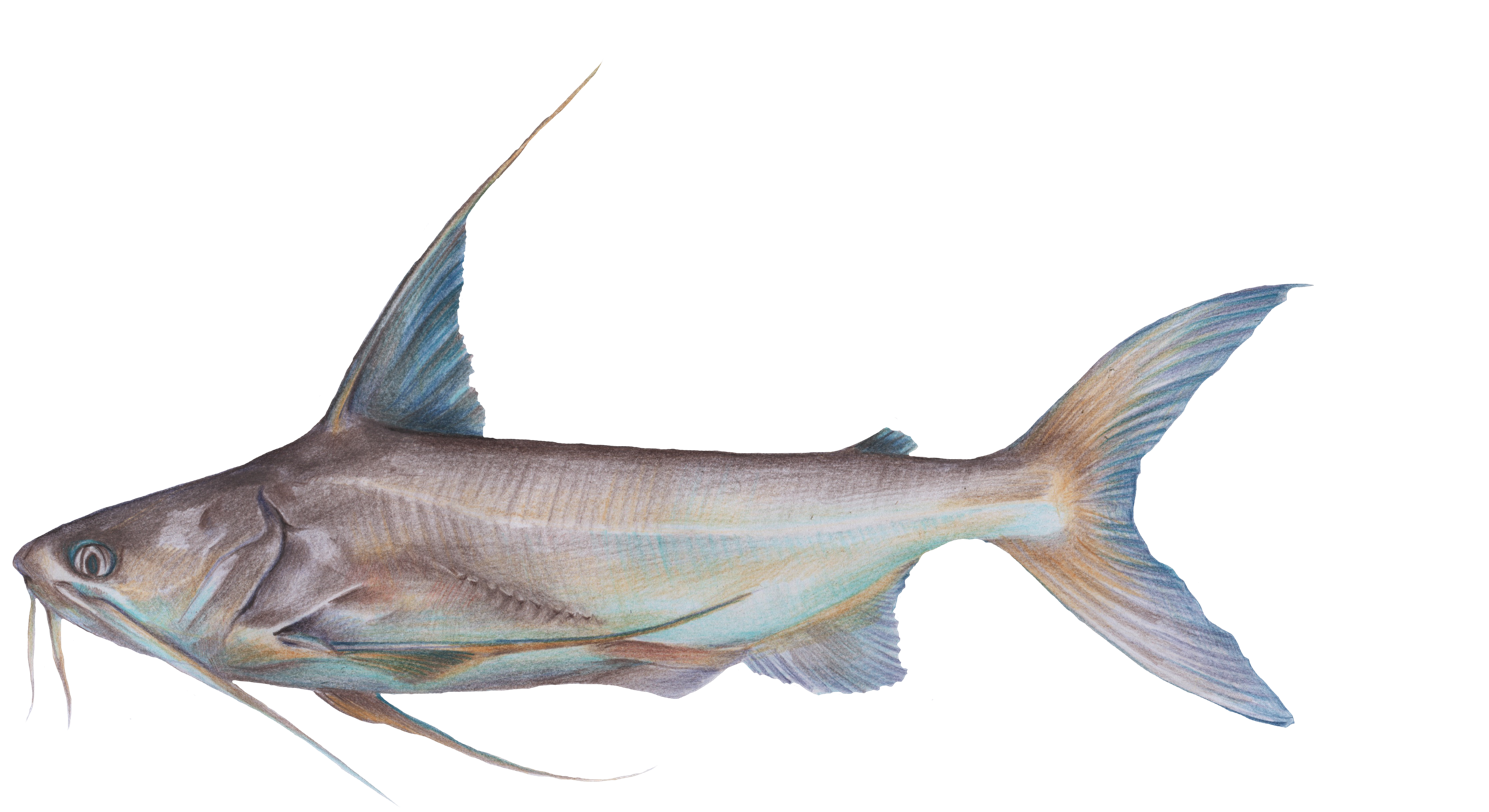
Bagre Bagre

Marajó Bay's estuarine waters provide a diverse feeding and nursery area for marine species in this ecosystem, and provides overall habitat for an estimated 108 marine species. There are many different marine species found in the Bay's waters, some examples of which are Scomberomorus brasiliensis, Cynoscion acoupa, Mugil sp. and Bagre bagre, are vital to the fishing health of locals. On the shorelines of the bay, mangroves can be found, and the general classifications of surrounding lands in "vegetation mosaics" are floodplain forests, upland forests, mangroves, and grassland. The bay provides a home to a unique variety of marine life, and mangroves in particular are vital to different life cycles of marine species such as fish or crustaceans.

== Human use ==
Due mainly to its size and geographic location, Marajó Bay has long been used by humans for a variety of reasons. The bay has proven to be a rewarding spot for both local, and industrial fishermen. Additionally, it is frequented by boats as a popular spot for shipping, due to its entrance at the Atlantic, and eventual deeper penetration into the mainland. Lastly, there have been past attempts in the area for fossil-fuel drillings, however they have proved futile.
