= Amazon Delta =

Delta of the Amazon River at its mouth in northern Brazil

Amazon Delta Delta do Amazonas (Portuguese)
- River delta
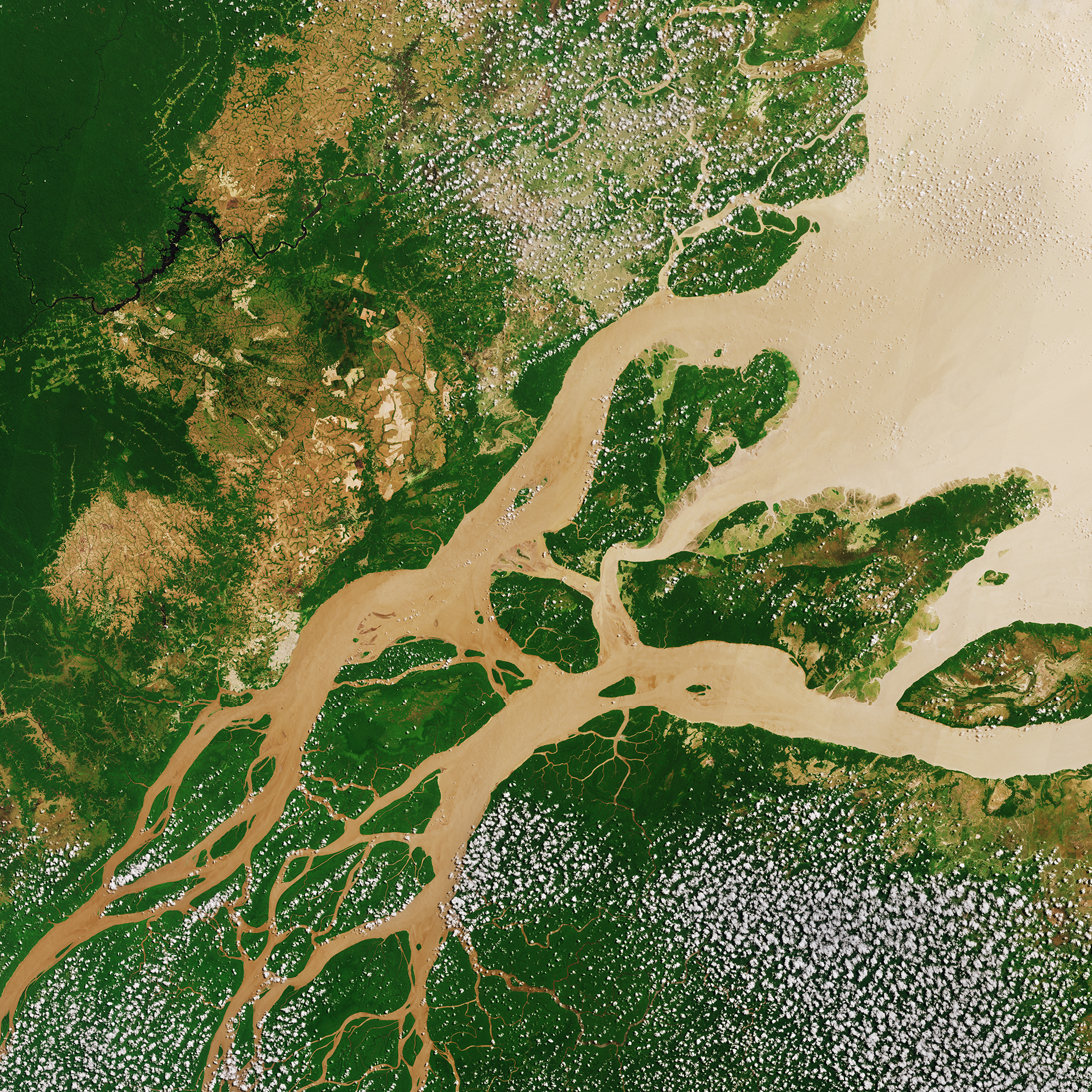
- Satellite image of the Amazon Delta captured by NASA in 2005

- Location within Brazil
- Coordinates: 0°08′04″N 50°25′33″W
- Location: North Region, Brazil
- States: Amapá, Pará

The Amazon Delta (Portuguese: delta do Amazonas) is a vast river delta formed by the Amazon River and the Tocantins River (through the Pará River distributary channel) in northern South America. It is located in the Brazilian states of Amapá and Pará and encompasses the Marajó Archipelago, with Marajó Island as its largest island. The region is 160,000 km2 and has 49 towns, with most of these being small towns with less than 20,000 inhabitants. The main cities located in the vicinity are Belém and Macapá, each with its respective metropolitan area.

It is the largest river delta in the world. It releases one fifth of the total amount of freshwater that is discharged into the earths oceans, into the Atlantic Ocean, with some estimating that equates to 200,000 litres a second. The area has wetlands, streams, lagoons and rich ecosystems and biodiversity. It is a vital area for wildlife, with extensive mangroves in wetland forests, that cover an area of 38,304 km2 of the delta, with 75% of Brazil's mangroves located in the Amazon Delta.

== Climate ==
The Amazon Delta has a tropical climate with high humidity and high temperatures. It has a wet season with frequent flooding and a dry season where the delta dries out. The wet season is considered to be January to June, with precipitation peaking in February, March and April. The dry season is July to December, with September, October and November seeing the least rainfall. Extreme flooding occurred in 2009, 2012, 2021, and 2022. These seasons shape the environment of the Amazon Delta and the life in it, such as the water buffalo for which Marajó Island is well known, three-toed sloth, capybara, giant anteater, giant otter, jaguar and pink river dolphins.

== Population ==
Historically, most settlements in the region were by the rivers, for transportation reasons. As these have expanded and small towns have developed along the banks of the watercourse, the floodplain and wetlands have been altered and large areas of vegetation have been cleared, with environmental consequences such as flooding, land movement and erosion.

Over 1.5 million people live locally to the Amazon Delta. The population in the region is growing, with basic infrastructure and public services often lacking, such as sanitation, drinking water, housing and medical care. Housing in the region is often constructed on stilts. Due to these factors, combined with the flooding that occurs in the region, there are health risks to the people living in the region, particularly from waterborne diseases such as cholera and typhoid fever and from vector-borne diseases, such as malaria, yellow fever and dengue.

Economic activity stems from industries such as agroforestry, fishing, mining, agriculture, and ranching, with these industries providing employment to people living in the region. Approximately 50,000 people living in the region rely on natural resource exploitation for employment.

== Marajó archipelago ==
The Marajó archipelago is based in the Amazon Delta region and includes 2,500 islands, with Marajó island being the largest. Other large islands include Caviana, Serraria and Mexiana. An area known as the Marajó Várzea ecoregion includes the archipelago's islands and floodplains. Tidal activity from the Atlantic Ocean results in twice daily flooding, as these tides cause the river water to disperse onto land. This creates a unique ecosystem, with fruit eating fish feeding on açaí palm, which is plentiful in the area. There are over 540 known bird species, including the scarlet ibis, black-collared hawk, parrots and macaws. The Amazon river dolphin can be found in the area, as well as water buffalo. It is designated as a protected area to help to safeguard it and to prevent ecological damage, known as the Marajó Archipelago Environmental Protection Area.

== Untypical delta ==
Due to the vast amounts of sediment and freshwater released by the Amazon, the delta is not a traditional one, for example in shape. The sedimentary environment near the Amazon's mouth has limited subaerial expression, untypical of a river delta. As a result, some people do not describe it as being a delta.

== Environmental concerns ==
In 2025, approval was given to Petrobras to drill in a location 500km from the mouth of the Amazon River. This decision raised concerns from environmentalists, with Brazil's Climate Observatory NGO describing this as being "disastrous from an environmental, climate, and sociobiodiversity perspective”. Oil drilling, which had commenced in October 2025, was put on hold by Brazils oil regulator in January 2026 whilst it sought further information after a leak of synthetic fluid occurred. The company confirmed it had contained the leak and that the fluid released was biodegradable and posed no environmental risk. Indigenous communities have raised concerns about the impact of the drilling, and how they were treated in respect of consultation with their communities.

Other environmental concerns include the impact of climate change and extreme weather events in the region, including flooding, and microplastic pollution.
