= Marajozinho River =

River in Pará, Brazil

Location
- Country: Brazil
- State: Pará

Physical characteristics
- Mouth
  - location: Bay of Afuá
  - coordinates: 0°9′40″S 50°23′40″W

The Marajozinho River (Portuguese: Rio Marajozinho) is a river of Marajó, which itself is an island in the Amazon Delta. It is located in the state Pará in northern Brazil.

== Course ==
The Marajozinho River is part of a complex system of rivers and furo river channels on the western side of Marajó that botanist Jacques Huber categorised as the Afuá-Charapucu System. It runs from the Furo Charapucu in the south to the various rivers and streams around the town Afuá in the north and is bounded on the west by the Vieira Grande Bay, which connects to the Amazon River.

The Afuá-Charapucu System is an anastomosing system, where numerous rivers and furos connect in complex ways, forming islands between them that are still part of the larger island Marajó. The source of Rio Marajozinho is on one of these islands, called Afuá Island, close to other islands called Piraiauara Island and Cajuúna Island.

The main town along the river is Afuá. It is located at a river bay formed by the confluence of the Afuá River, the Cajuúna and the Marajozinho River. Within the Afuá-Charapucu System, the Cajari connects to these rivers through a river channel called the Santana Channel (Canal de Santana).

== Cultural geography ==
The town Afuá was founded in 1870 when Micaela Arcanja Ferreira donated a tract of land bordered by the Afuá, Cajuúna and Marajozinho rivers to construct a chapel dedicated to Our Lady of the Immaculate Conception. The town is heavily influenced by the tides of these rivers. They mostly depend on the water levels in Vieira Grande Bay. Since many homes are built on stilts to prepare for high waters and transportation is mainly by boats, the town received the ephitet "The Venice of Marajó".

The river is contained in the 59,985-square-kilometre (23,160 sq mi) Marajó Archipelago Environmental Protection Area, a sustainable-use conservation unit established in 1989 to protect the environment of the region.

== See also ==
- List of rivers of Pará
