= Furo Charapucu =

- Location within Brazil

Location
- Country: Brazil
- State: Pará

Physical characteristics
- Source
  - location: Mondongo swamps, Marajó
- Mouth
  - location: Vieira Grande Bay
  - coordinates: 0°26′20″S 50°42′30″W

Basin features
- Tributaries
  - right: Cajari River; Jurará River

The Furo Charapucu is a furo river channel of Marajó, which itself is an island in the Amazon Delta. It is located in the state Pará in northern Brazil.

== Course ==
The Furo Charapucu has its source in the mondongo swamps in the north of the island Marajó. It flows southward until a sharp bend, after which it flows westward into the Vieira Grande Bay.

The Furo Charapucu is part of a complex system of rivers and furo river channels on the western side of Marajó that botanist Jacques Huber categorised as the Afuá-Charapucu System. It runs from the Furo Charapucu in the south to the various rivers and streams around the town Afuá in the north and is bounded on the west by the Vieira Grande Bay, which connects to the Amazon River. The Afuá-Charapucu System is an anastomosing system, where numerous rivers and furos connect in complex ways, forming islands between them that are still part of the larger island Marajó.

This happens on a rather large scale between the Furo Charapucu and the Cajari River. The Furo Charapucu flows westward into Vieira Grande Bay. The Cajari River is a right branch of the Charapucu, flowing north until a sharp bend, after which it also flows west into the bay. This forms an island between them within the island Marajó that is called Charapucu Island.

The Afuá-Charapucu System connects to another river system hat is called the Anajás-Aramá System, mainly through two river channels: the Furo Acará Pereira and the Furo das Preguiças. These flow between the bend in the Furo Charapucu and the Anajás River.

The Furo Charapucu forks several times before reaching Vieira Grande Bay, giving rise to several smaller islands such as Japuti Island.

== Nature protection ==
The Furo Charapucu is contained within the Marajó Archipelago Environmental Protection Area, a 5,998,570 hectares (14,822,800 acres) sustainable use conservation unit created in 1989 to protect the Marajó island and surrounding islands. Within this protected area, Charapucu Island is covered by the 65,181 hectares (161,070 acres) Charapucu State Park.

== See also ==
- List of rivers of Pará
