= Mapua =

Mapuá, Māpua or Mapúa may refer to:

- Mapuá River, a river in Pará state in north-central Brazil
  - Mapuá Extractive Reserve, a protected area
  - Treaty of the Mapuá, a treaty between the Portuguese and indigenous groups
- Māpua, New Zealand, a small town on the South Island of New Zealand
- Tomás Mapúa, the first registered Filipino architect and founder of Mapúa University
  - Mapúa University, a tertiary institute in Manila, Philippines
  - Mapúa Cardinals, varsity teams of the university
