= Cajari River (Marajó) =

- Location within Brazil

Location
- Country: Brazil
- State: Pará

Physical characteristics
- Source
  - location: Furo Charapucu
- Mouth
  - location: Vieira Grande Bay
  - coordinates: 0°11′30″S 50°34′00″W

The Cajari River (Portuguese: Rio Cajari) is a river of Marajó, which itself is an island in the Amazon Delta. It is located in the state Pará in northern Brazil.

== Course ==
The Cajari is part of a complex system of rivers and furo river channels on the western side of Marajó that botanist Jacques Huber categorised as the Afuá-Charapucu System. It runs from the Furo Charapucu in the south to the various rivers and streams around the town Afuá in the north and is bounded on the west by the Vieira Grande Bay, which connects to the Amazon River. The Afuá-Charapucu System is an anastomosing system, where numerous rivers and furos connect in complex ways, forming islands between them that are still part of the larger island Marajó.

This happens on a rather large scale between the Furo Charapucu and the Cajari River. The Furo Charapucu flows westward into Vieira Grande Bay. The Cajari River is a right branch of the Charapucu, flowing north until a sharp bend, after which it also flows west into the bay. This forms an island between them within the island Marajó that is called Charapucu Island.

At the bend towards the west, a branch of the Cajari called the Santana Channel (Canal de Santana) splits off in northern direction towards the town Afuá, where it connects with various other rivers and streams, among which the Cajuúna River, the Afuá River and the Marajozinho River

Somewhat confusingly, there are islands associated with the Cajari called the Island of the Cajari (Ilha do Cajari) and Cajari Island (Ilha Cajari). The former is formed by a stream called Furo Maguari, an anabranch that splits off the Cajari before the bend and reconnects with it afterwards. Caraji Island is located where the Cajari enters Vieira grande Bay. The main channel of the Cajari passes this island on the left, whereas another channel called Furo São Domingos passes it on the right.

== Nature protection ==
The Cajari River is contained within the Marajó Archipelago Environmental Protection Area, a 5,998,570 hectares (14,822,800 acres) sustainable use conservation unit created in 1989 to protect the Marajó island and surrounding islands. Within this protected area, Charapucu Island is covered by the 65,181 hectares (161,070 acres) Charapucu State Park.

== See also ==
- List of rivers of Pará
