= Aramá River =

- Location within Brazil

Location
- Country: Brazil
- State: Pará

Physical characteristics
- Source
  - location: Anajás River
- Mouth
  - location: Jacaré Grande River
  - coordinates: 1°5′S 50°41′W
- Length: 75 km (47 mi)
- Width
  - maximum: 300 metres (980 ft)
- Depth
  - maximum: 30 metres (98 ft)

Basin features
- Tributaries
  - left: Mapuá River
  - right: Furo Japicháua

The Aramá River (Portuguese: Rio Aramá, also spelled Aramã) is a river of Marajó, which itself is an island in the Amazon Delta. It is a right tributary of the Jacaré Grande River. The name Aramá stems from the Tupi–Guarani languages and means "Mother of Honey", referring to bees.

== Course ==
The Aramá has multiple sources in the swamp areas called mondongos that are normally flooded during the wet season. They feed into the river through various branches, among them Braço do Soco and Braço do Jacaré. One of the sources is a lake called Lago dos Leões on the boundary of Anajás municipality that feeds into the river through Braço do Soco. The Aramá also receives water from the Anajás River.

The Aramá runs along the border of São Sebastião da Boa Vista and Curralinho municipalities. Its main tributaries are the Mapuá River and a furo river channel called Furo Japicháua. The Mapuá enters the Aramá opposite a river island called Basílio Island. The Aramá River connects to the Jacaré Grande River through a furo called Furo Jacarezinho. This happens close to areas that are enclosed by rivers and streams and that are called Tapuia Island and Camarão Island.

Water levels in the Aramá depend on the variation between rainy and dry seasons, and on the tides in the Amazon. Levels are high in the months January–June, and low from July to November.

In the past, important economic activities along the river were the extraction of rubber and logging. In the present day, the main activities are the extraction of açaí, fishery (using traditional fish traps called matapi and cacuri) and small-scale agriculture (especially cassava for the production of farinha flour).

The river forms the northern boundary in the western part of the Mapuá Extractive Reserve. The Mapuá River, a left tributary of the Aramá, runs along the southern boundary of the reserve. The reserve contains sheets of tidal water and mangroves. The reserve is mostly lowland floodplain, with some terra firma in the centre of the territory.

== See also ==
- List of rivers of Pará
