= Charapucu State Park =

State park in Pará, Brazil

- Parque Estadual Charapucu
- IUCN category II (national park)
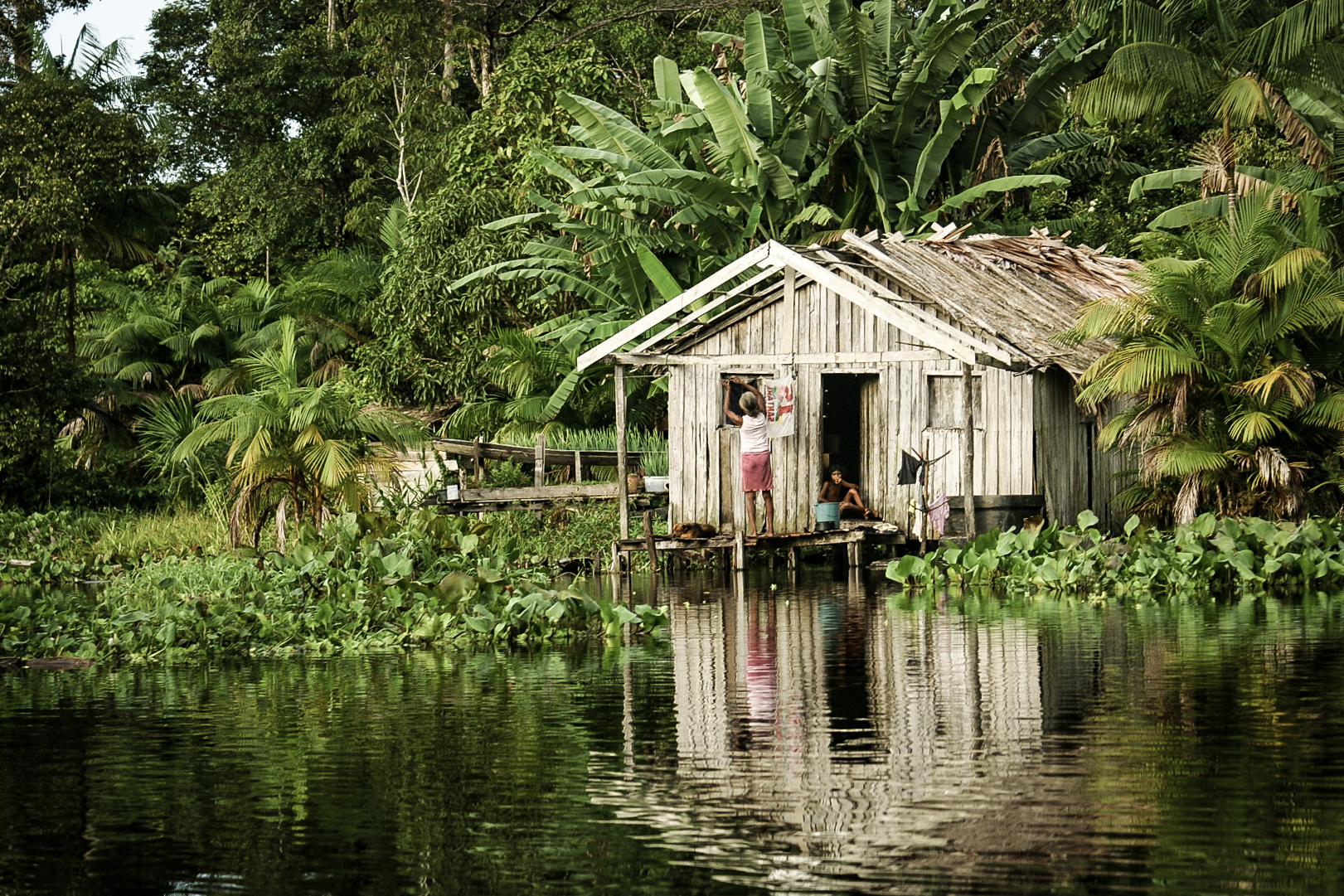
- Morning in the Parque Estadual Charapucu

- Location within Brazil
- Nearest city: Afuá, Pará
- Coordinates: 0.370156°S 50.523353°W
- Area: 65,181 hectares (161,070 acres)
- Designation: State park
- Administrator: Instituto de Desenvolvimento Florestal e da Biodiversidade (Ideflor-Bio)

The Charapucu State Park (Portuguese: Parque Estadual Charapucu) is a state park in the state of Pará, Brazil. It protects an area of the island of Marajó at the mouth of the Amazon River, much of which is flooded by the river or the tides. The vegetation is typical of flooded rainforest, and fauna include several rare or endangered species.

== Location ==
The Charapucu State Park is contained in the municipality of Afuá, Pará. It has an area of 65,181 hectares (161,070 acres). The park is bounded by the Vieira Grande Bay to the north west. The Cajari River runs to the east of the park into the Vieira Grande Bay. The Furo Charapucu channel runs to the south of the park, connecting the Cajari River to another part of the Vieira Grande Bay. The park is contained within the Marajó Archipelago Environmental Protection Area, a 5,998,570-hectare (14,822,800-acre) sustainable use conservation unit created in 1989 to protect the Marajó island and surrounding islands in the delta region where the Amazon and Tocantins rivers empty into the Atlantic Ocean.

== Environment ==
The park has an Amazonian floodplain and flooded forest ecosystem, and includes areas that have never been explored. Rivers include muddy white water from the Amazon and blackwater rivers from the interior of the island. It contains various rare or endangered species. Flora include Virola surinamensis, Carapa guianensis, Ceiba pentandra, Calycophyllum spruceanum, Platymiscium filipes, Mauritia flexuosa and Açaí palm (Euterpe oleracea).

Fauna include Arrau turtle (Podocnemis expansa), spectacled caiman (Caiman crocodilus), southern tamandua (Tamandua tetradactyla), Dasypus species, Kaapori capuchin (Cebus kaapori), South American tapir (Tapirus terrestris), cougar (Puma concolor), jaguar (Panthera onca), Amazonian manatee (Trichechus inunguis) and West Indian manatee (Trichechus manatus).

== History ==
The Charapucu State Park was created by Governor Ana Julia Carepa by state decree 2592 of 9 November 2010. The purpose was to preserve the natural ecosystems and landscape of an area of Marajó island, to support scientific research, eco-tourism and environmental education. The park would support the request by the Pará Secretariat of State for the Environment (SEMA PA) for UNESCO to recognise the proposed Marajó Biosphere Reserve. A working group to develop the management plan was appointed on 12 April 2013 and a consultative council was created on 15 April 2013. A managing council was formed on 31 July 2013.

In July 2015 the team responsible for managing the Marajó APA and the state park from the Institute of Forest Development and Biodiversity (Ideflor-Bio) held meetings with the Afuá municipality communities to discuss possible changes to the boundaries and conservation status of the park. The meetings were to identify areas used by the communities and the most common uses made of natural resources.

== Sources ==
- APA Arquipélago do Marajó (in Portuguese), ISA: Instituto Socioambiental
- Giovanni Salera Júnior (February 2011), Parque Estadual Charapucu, Ilha de Marajó – PA
- PES Charapucu (in Portuguese), ISA: Instituto Socioambiental
- Renata Dias (28 May 2015), Ideflor-Bio e comunidade discutirão recategorização do Parque Estadual do Charapucu (in Portuguese), Instituto de Desenvolvimento Florestal e da Biodiversidade, archived from the original on 5 August 2016
