= Jacaré Grande River =

- Location within Brazil
- Native name: Rio Jacaré Grande (Portuguese)

Location
- Country: Brazil

Physical characteristics
- Source
  - location: Pará state
- Mouth
  - coordinates: 0.566080°S 50.781900°W

Basin features
- Tributaries
  - right: Aramá River

The Jacaré Grande River (Portuguese: Rio Jacaré Grande) is a river in the Pará state of north-central Brazil. It is considered an extension of the Pará River distribution channel.

The Jacaré Grande River rises on the island of Marajó in the delta region where the Amazon and Tocantins rivers enter into the Atlantic Ocean. It empties into the Vieira Grande Bay. The river is contained within the Marajó Archipelago Environmental Protection Area.

Several rivers and streams flow from the Island Marajó into the Jacaré Grande River, including the Aramá River.

== See also ==
- List of rivers of Pará
