= Serraria Island =

Serraria Island may refer to:

- Serraria Island, Pará, an island in the Brazilian state Pará
- Serraria Island, São Paulo, an islet in the Brazilian state São Paulo
