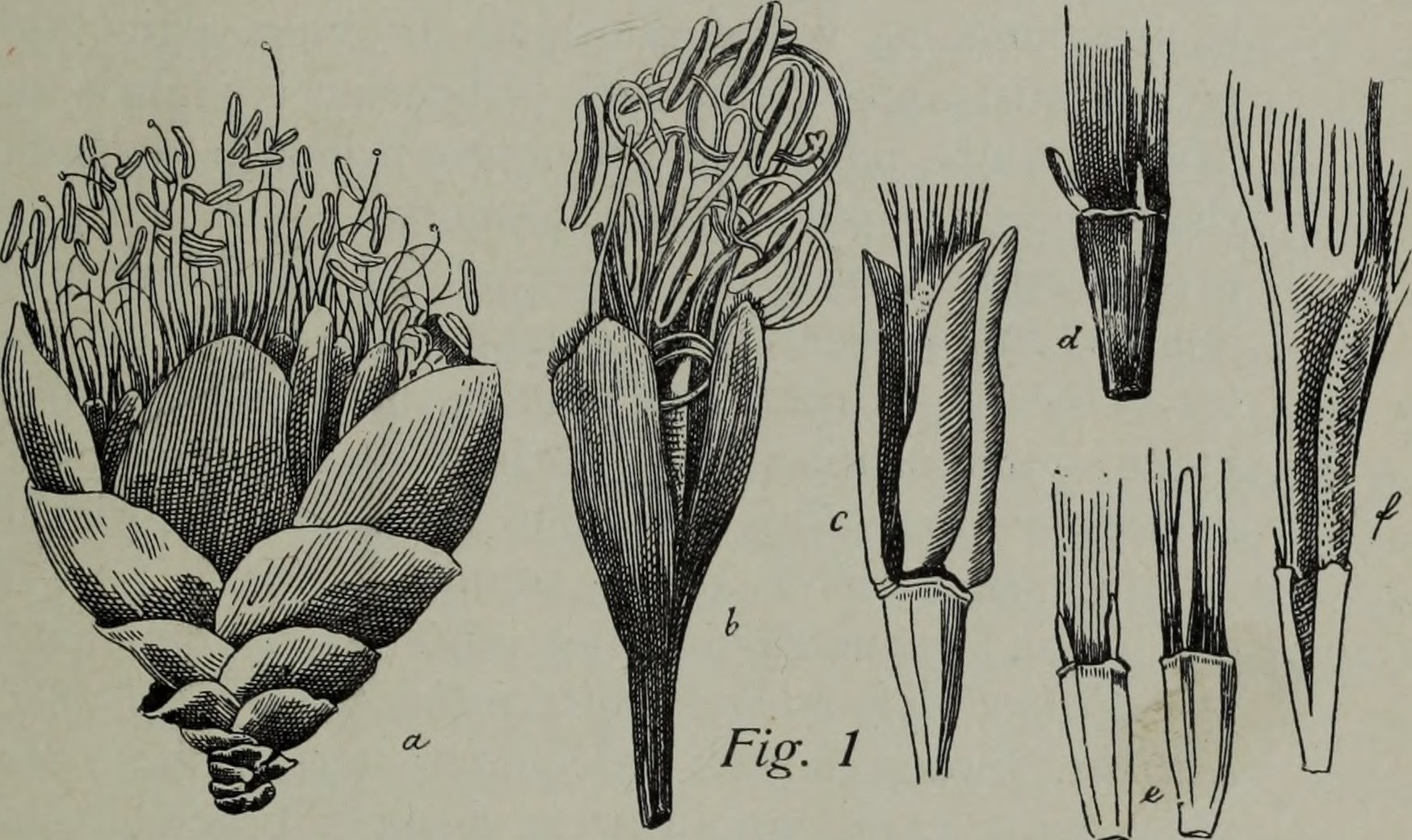
- Browneopsis ucayalina

Scientific classification
- Kingdom: Plantae
- Clade: Tracheophytes
- Clade: Angiosperms
- Clade: Eudicots
- Clade: Rosids
- Order: Fabales
- Family: Fabaceae
- Subfamily: Detarioideae
- Tribe: Amherstieae
- Genus: Browneopsis; Huber

Species
- 8; see text

= Browneopsis =

Genus of legumes

Browneopsis is a genus of flowering plants in the family Fabaceae. There are about 8 species of trees native to South America, ranging from Panama through Colombia and Ecuador to Peru and northern Brazil. Species typically grow in lowland tropical rain forests, including inundated and terra firme forests, and in sub-montane forests in the foothills of the Andes.

Species include:

- Browneopsis cauliflora (Poepp.) Huber – Colombia and Peru
- Browneopsis disepala (Little) Klitg. – western Ecuador
- Browneopsis excelsa Pittier – Panama, Colombia, and Peru
- Browneopsis macrofoliolata Klitg. – western Ecuador
- Browneopsis peruviana (J.F.Macbr.) Klitg. – Peru and northern Brazil
- Browneopsis puyensis D.A.Neill & Asanza – Ecuador
- Browneopsis sanintiae Silverst. – Colombia
- Browneopsis ucayalina Huber – Ecuador and Peru
