= Breves, Pará =

Breves
- Municipality
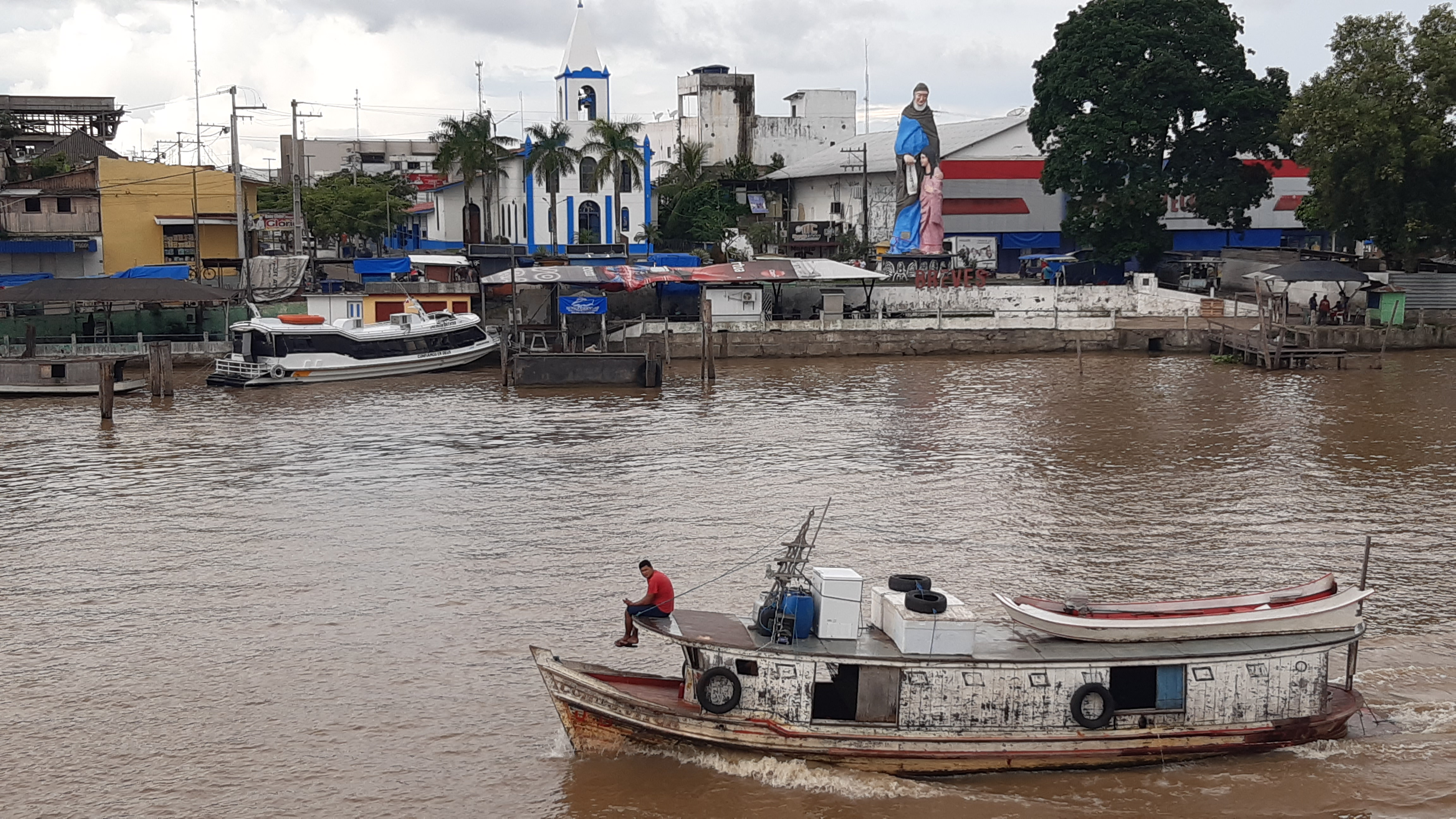
- Seen from the river in 2024

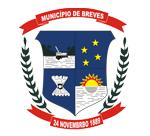
- Flag

- Location in the State of Pará
- Coordinates: 01°40′55″S 50°28′48″W
- Country: Brazil
- Region: North
- State: Pará
- Founded: November 19, 1738
- Emancipation: October 25, 1851

Government
  - Mayor: Toninho Barbosa

Area
  - Total: 9,550.454 km^{2} (3,687.451 sq mi)
- Elevation: 40 m (130 ft)

Population (2025 est.)
  - Total: 116,058
  - Density: 12.1521/km^{2} (31.4738/sq mi)
- Time zone: UTC−3 (BRT)
- Postal Code: 68800-000
- Website: http://www.breves.pa.gov.br

Breves is a Brazilian municipality located in the state of Pará, on the island of Marajó. Its population as of 2025 is estimated to be 116,058 people. The area of the municipality is 9,550.454 km^{2}. The city belongs to the mesoregion of Marajó and to the microregion of Furos de Breves.

The municipality is contained in the 59,985-square-kilometre (23,160 sq mi) Marajó Archipelago Environmental Protection Area, a sustainable use conservation unit established in 1989 to protect the environment of the delta region. It contains the 93,746-hectare (231,650-acre) Mapuá Extractive Reserve, a sustainable use conservation unit created in 2005.

The city is served by Breves Airport.

In August 1659, the Treaty of the Mapuá was signed at the Mapuá River by Portuguese Jesuits led by António Vieira with various indigenous peoples who inhabited the Marajó Archipelago. The ceremony took place near a locality called Vila Amélia (1°7′S 50°18′W). In the present day, there is still an indigenous cemetery at the spot where the treaty was signed.

== Climate ==
The climate is tropical rainforest (Köppen: Af), although August to October is nearly dry enough to be a tropical monsoon climate (Am). Temperatures are hot with extremely humidity all year round, and rainfall ranges from moderate to very heavy.

Climate data for Breves (1981–2010)
Month	Jan	Feb	Mar	Apr	May	Jun	Jul	Aug	Sep	Oct	Nov	Dec	Year
Mean daily maximum °C (°F)	31.4 (88.5)	30.9 (87.6)	30.9 (87.6)	31.1 (88.0)	31.7 (89.1)	32.1 (89.8)	32.3 (90.1)	32.9 (91.2)	32.9 (91.2)	32.9 (91.2)	32.8 (91.0)	32.3 (90.1)	32.0 (89.6)
Daily mean °C (°F)	26.1 (79.0)	25.8 (78.4)	25.8 (78.4)	26.0 (78.8)	26.6 (79.9)	26.6 (79.9)	26.7 (80.1)	26.9 (80.4)	27.0 (80.6)	27.1 (80.8)	27.1 (80.8)	26.6 (79.9)	26.5 (79.7)
Mean daily minimum °C (°F)	22.5 (72.5)	22.4 (72.3)	22.6 (72.7)	22.8 (73.0)	23.0 (73.4)	22.7 (72.9)	22.4 (72.3)	22.4 (72.3)	22.5 (72.5)	22.6 (72.7)	22.6 (72.7)	22.6 (72.7)	22.6 (72.7)
Average rainfall mm (inches)	278.3 (10.96)	318.5 (12.54)	377.5 (14.86)	323.6 (12.74)	253.0 (9.96)	179.5 (7.07)	111.3 (4.38)	63.1 (2.48)	60.2 (2.37)	69.4 (2.73)	87.7 (3.45)	198.9 (7.83)	2,321 (91.4)
Average rainy days (≥ 1.0 mm)	21	21	24	21	19	14	10	7	8	9	9	16	179
Average relative humidity (%)	87.9	89.6	89.8	89.0	86.7	84.9	84.1	82.6	82.3	82.8	82.7	86.1	85.7
Mean monthly sunshine hours	127.9	96.8	107.9	111.5	159.8	199.5	246.2	254.1	221.8	210.6	176.6	157.9	2,070.6
Source: Instituto Nacional de Meteorologia

== See also ==
- List of municipalities in Pará
