= "Italy – Costa Rica" Biological Meteo-Climatic Station =

Research facility in Costa Rica

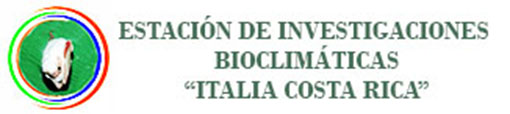

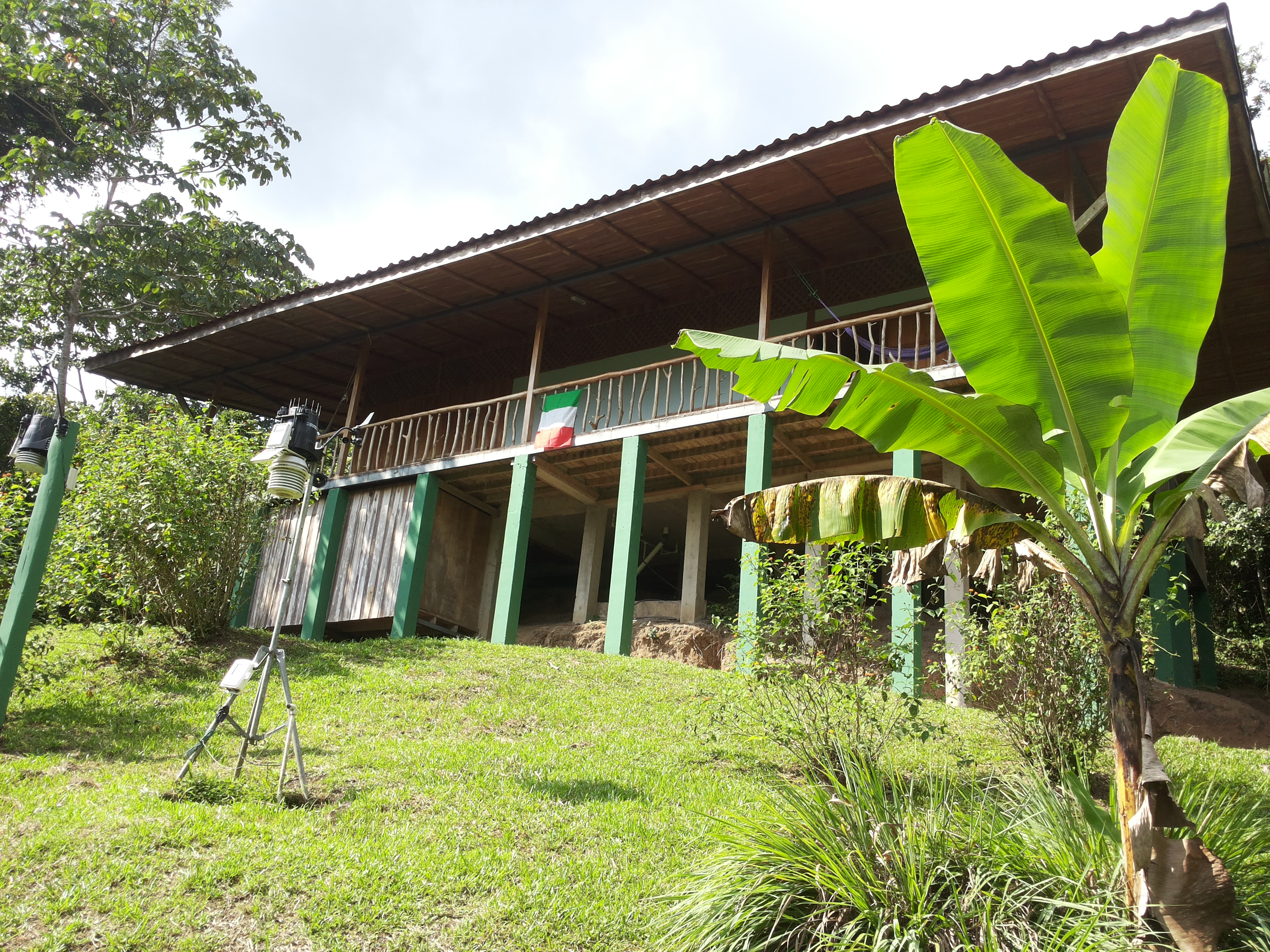
- The station inside the forest at the Karen Mogensen Reserve.
- Formation: 2014/03/01
- Founder: ASEPALECO - Foreste per Sempre OdV
- Type: Research; Education; Nonprofit
- Coordinates: 9.871378°N 85.057386°W
- Owner: Asepaleco
- Website: https://www.biometeo.org/en/

The "Italy – Costa Rica" Biological Meteo-Climatic Station is a scientific research facility located within the Karen Mogensen Nature Reserve, on the Nicoya Peninsula, in Costa Rica, province of Puntarenas, district of Lepanto. Born from an Italian-Costa Rican collaboration, the station carries out atmospheric monitoring activities, biodiversity studies and environmental education programmes.

== Description ==
The station is the result of an initiative promoted by GEV Modena (Voluntary Ecological Guards of Modena) and the association Foreste per Sempre OdV, based in Modena, Italy. The project was made possible through a fundraising campaign involving local businesses and organisations from the Modena area, committed to environmental protection and international cooperation.

On the Costa Rican side, the construction and management of the station are entrusted to ASEPALECO (Asociación Ecológica de Paquera, Lepanto y Cóbano), the local environmental association that manages the Karen Mogensen Reserve and the surrounding protected natural areas.

== History ==
=== The Karen Mogensen Nature Reserve ===
The Karen Mogensen Nature Reserve is located on the Nicoya Peninsula, in the province of Puntarenas, Costa Rica. Established in memory of Karen Mogensen, a Danish naturalist who devoted her life to the conservation of the Costa Rican tropical forest, the reserve extends over more than 1,000 hectares of primary and secondary rainforest, hosting an exceptional variety of neotropical flora and fauna. The territory is characterised by a transitional environment between humid and seasonally dry forest, making it particularly valuable for studying the effects of climate change on tropical ecosystems. The forest constitutes an important hydrographic basin that ensures a secure water supply for surrounding communities.

The government is currently in the process of officially designating it as a "Refugio Nacional de Vida Silvestre de propiedad privada" (National Wildlife Refuge of private ownership).

The Reserve hosts several endangered species listed on the IUCN Red List, including: Vampyrum spectrum (spectral bat), Leopardus wiedii (margay), Alouatta palliata (mantled howler monkey), Cebus imitator (white-faced capuchin), Amazona auropalliata (yellow-naped amazon), Procnias tricarunculatus (three-wattled bellbird), Eupsittula canicularis (orange-fronted parakeet), Rhinoclemmys pulcherrima (painted wood turtle). From a botanical perspective, in addition to vulnerable species such as Dalbergia retusa (rosewood) and Platymiscium parviflorum (cristóbal), a study is underway on the presence of Erythrochiton gymnanthus (cafecillo), a rare endemic native plant found in the Reserve and only a few other sites in Costa Rica. Censuses of orchids, ferns and fungi are ongoing.

=== Construction and inauguration ===
The biological station was built during 2013 thanks to funds raised in Italy and the technical and logistical collaboration of ASEPALECO. The work included the fitting out of a scientific laboratory, the installation of meteo-climatic instrumentation and the setting up of infrastructure for connectivity and educational activities.

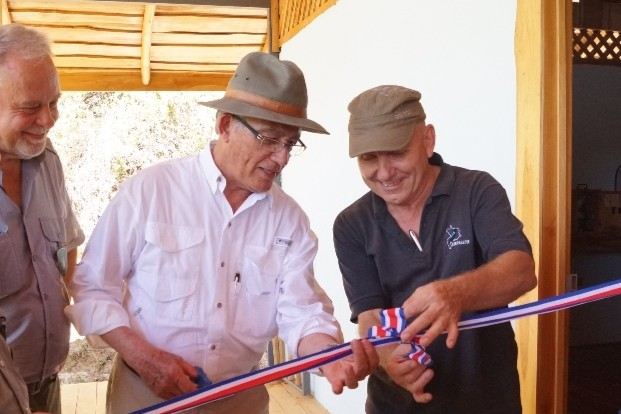
Costa Rica Vice President Alfio Piva cuts the ribbon at the "Italia Costa Rica" Bioclimatic Station.

The station was inaugurated in March 2014 in the presence of the Vice-President of the Republic of Costa Rica, Alfio Piva, as a sign of the institutional importance attributed to the project by the Costa Rican authorities.

In February 2024, the ceremony marking the 10th anniversary of the Station's activity was held in the presence of the Italian Ambassador to Costa Rica.

=== Management ===
The operational management of the station is entrusted to ASEPALECO, an association founded in the early 1990s with the aim of promoting the conservation of the forest ecosystem of the central Pacific coast of Costa Rica. The association is responsible for the protection of natural areas in the region, promoting reforestation activities, scientific research, environmental education and ecotourism.

The scientific coordination of the station is carried out by Prof. Dario Sonetti, who holds the role of Scientific Director and ensures the connection with Italian academic and research institutions, in particular with the University of Modena and Reggio Emilia (Unimore).

The activity relating to the study of meteorological data and climate change is led by Luca Lombroso, AMPRO meteorologist and environmental communicator, formerly a technician at the Geophysical Observatory of Modena, Department of Engineering "Enzo Ferrari", University of Modena and Reggio Emilia.

== Activities ==
The "Italy – Costa Rica" Biological Meteo-Climatic Station carries out a wide range of scientific, educational and outreach activities:

=== Scientific research ===
The station serves as an operational base for Italian and Costa Rican researchers engaged in the study of tropical ecosystems. Research activities focus in particular on forest ecology, the phenology of plant and animal species, and the analysis of the impacts of climate variations on local biodiversity.

=== Biodiversity monitoring and surveys ===
Through periodic and systematic surveys, the station contributes to the census of species present in the reserve, with particular attention to mammals, birds, amphibians, reptiles and insects. The data collected feed national and international databases on neotropical biodiversity. Several papers have been published on research conducted at the Karen Mogensen Nature Reserve.

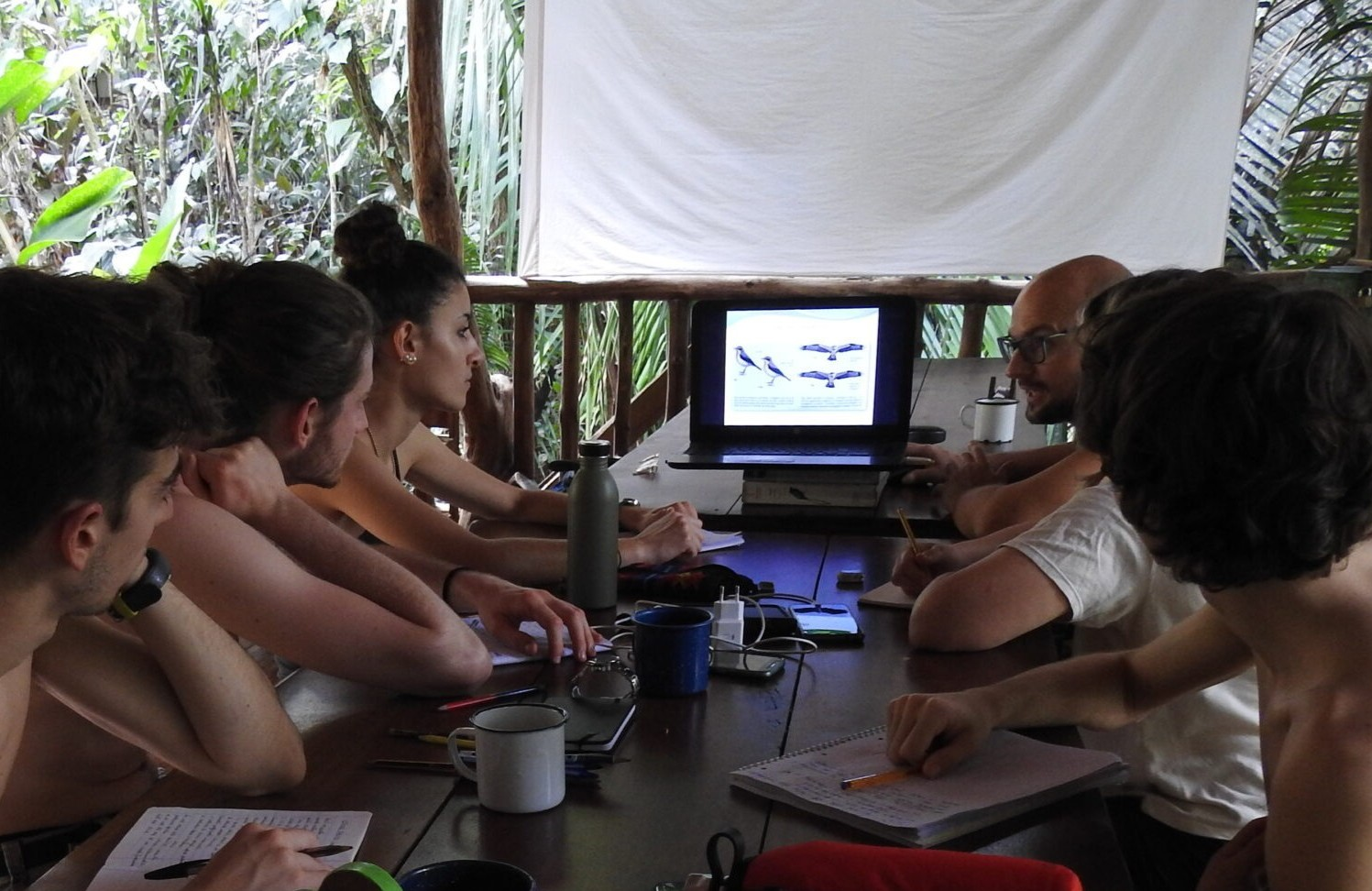
Field lessons for UNIMORE students at the "Italia Costa Rica" Weather and Climate Biological Station, Karen Mogensen Nature Reserve, Costa Rica

=== Field school ===
The station hosts field school sessions for university students and researchers, both Italian and Costa Rican, who carry out practical training activities in the natural environment of the reserve. Field schools represent a unique opportunity for direct learning of sampling techniques, species identification and data collection in tropical ecosystems.

Field School Project in Costa Rica

=== Environmental education ===
Among the station's core missions is the promotion of environmental education, aimed at both local schools and the wider community. The programmes aim to raise awareness among younger generations and the public about the value of tropical forest conservation and the need to adopt sustainable behaviours.

=== Real-time atmospheric monitoring ===
The station carries out continuous monitoring of local atmospheric parameters, transmitting climatic data in real time to partner scientific institutions in Italy (Geophysical Observatory of Modena). This activity makes it possible to build significant historical climatic series for the Nicoya Peninsula area, which is notably exposed to the effects of the El Niño phenomenon and other extreme weather events.

=== Study of the impact of climate change on biodiversity ===
The station's strategic objective is to assess the long-term effects of climate change on the reserve's ecosystem, analysing variations in the distribution, abundance and behaviour of species in relation to observed climate trends.

== Equipment ==
=== Internet connection and Wi-Fi network ===
Provides the connectivity required for real-time data transmission and communications with Italian and international partners.

=== Scientific laboratory ===
Equipped for the analysis of biological samples, classification of specimens and the conduct of educational and research activities.

=== Davis Vantage Pro 2 weather station ===
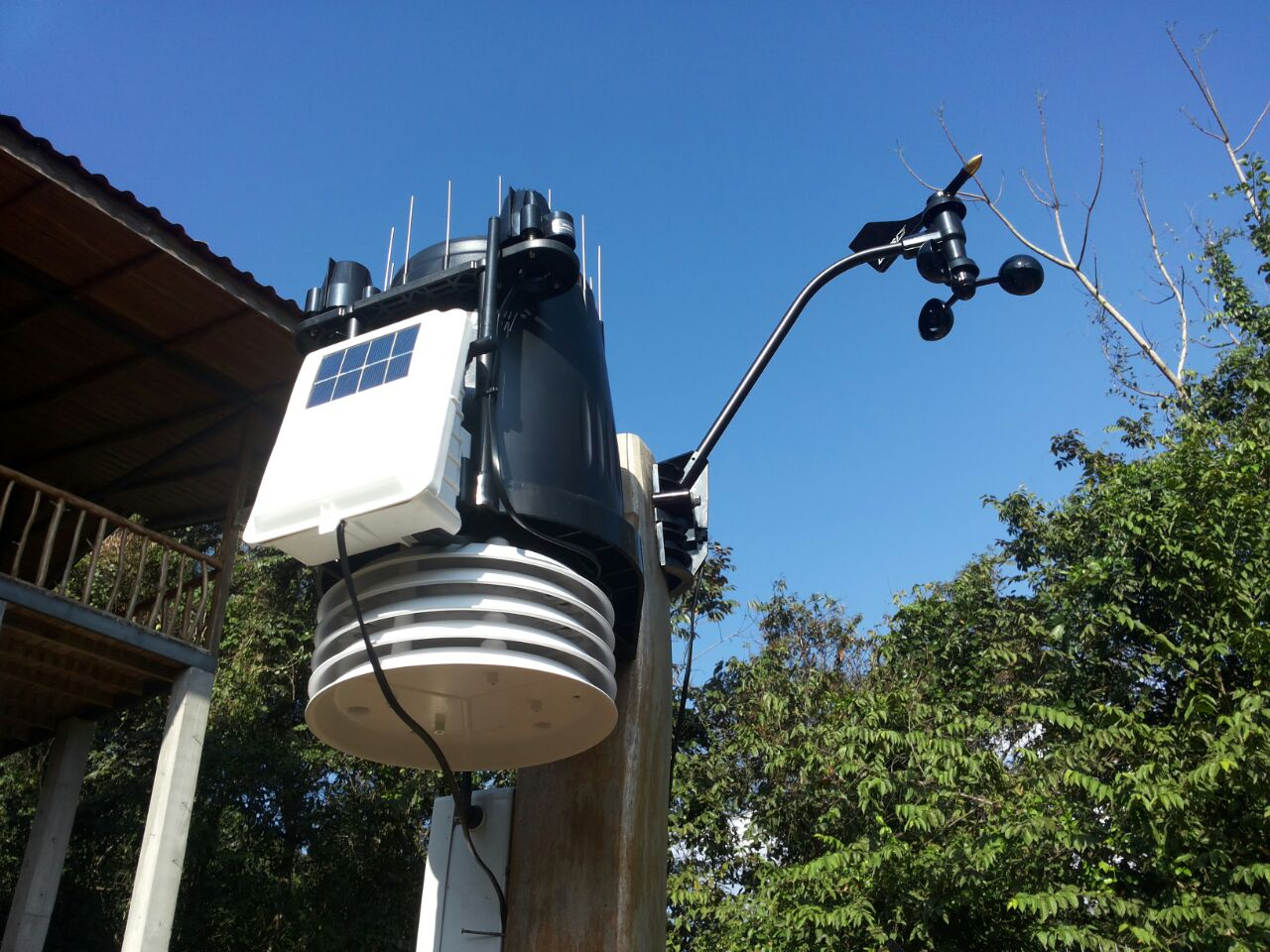
Weather instrumentation at the biological meteorological and climatic research station at the Karen Mogensen Reserve, Costa Rica

With WeatherLink datalogger, connected to the University of Modena and Reggio Emilia (Unimore). The instrumentation enables the continuous measurement and recording of temperature, humidity, atmospheric pressure, precipitation, wind speed and direction, solar radiation and other microclimatic parameters.

=== WeatherCam 4K ===
A 4K webcam framing part of a hillside and part of the sky, providing information on both the condition of the trees and the forest and the presence and type of clouds. The transmitted data can be used to evaluate automated computer analysis models (computer vision), including artificial intelligence technologies.
