= Mamaianaz people =

Mamaianaz
Regions with significant populations
- Marajó

The Mamaianaz people were an Indigenous people in Brazil. In the seventeenth century they were one of the possibly 29 peoples that lived on the island Marajó in the Amazon Delta. The Mamaianaz were present when indigenous groups of the Marajó Archipelago swore the Treaty of the Mapuá in front of Portuguese Jesuits missionary António Vieira in 1659. According to an assessment made by the Oversees Council (Conselho Ultramarino) in 1693, they lived in villages controlled by the Jesuits by that time.
