= Platymiscium gracile =

Conservation status
- Vulnerable (IUCN 2.3)

Scientific classification
- Kingdom: Plantae
- Clade: Tracheophytes
- Clade: Angiosperms
- Clade: Eudicots
- Clade: Rosids
- Order: Fabales
- Family: Fabaceae
- Subfamily: Faboideae
- Genus: Platymiscium
- Species: P. gracile

Binomial name
- Platymiscium gracile Benth.
- Range of Platymiscium gracile.

Species of plant

Platymiscium gracile is a species of plant in the family Fabaceae. It is found only in Peru.
