= Browneopsis disepala =

Conservation status
- Endangered (IUCN 3.1)

Scientific classification
- Kingdom: Plantae
- Clade: Tracheophytes
- Clade: Angiosperms
- Clade: Eudicots
- Clade: Rosids
- Order: Fabales
- Family: Fabaceae
- Genus: Browneopsis
- Species: B. disepala

Binomial name
- Browneopsis disepala (Little) Klitgaard

Species of legume

Browneopsis disepala is a species of plant in the family Fabaceae. It is found only in Ecuador. Its natural habitats are subtropical or tropical dry forests, subtropical or tropical moist lowland forests, and subtropical or tropical moist montane forests.
