= Serraria Island, Pará =

Island in Pará, Brazil

Serraria Island / Queimada
- Queimada on a WorldWind satellite image from 1990

- Location within Brazil

Geography
- Location: Pará State, Brazil
- Coordinates: 0°7′S 50°50′W
- Archipelago: Marajó Archipelago
- Area: 818 km^{2} (316 sq mi)
- Length: 47 km (29.2 mi)
- Width: 29 km (18 mi)
- Highest elevation: 32 m (105 ft)

Administration
- Brazil
- State: Pará
- Municipality: Afuá

Serraria Island (Portuguese: Ilha da Serraria), also called Queimada (Ilha Queimada), is an island in the Brazilian state Pará, located within the Amazon Delta. The island is part of the municipality of Afuá.

The Western coast of the island lines the main channel of the Amazon River, opposite the city of Macapá. Because of the distances, inhabitants of Serraria Island seek most services like banks and schools in Macapá instead of Afuá. The Eastern coast of the island is on Vieira Grande Bay, which separates it from the island Marajó.

The island is mostly covered with tropical rainforest. The main economic activity on the island is the production of açaí, followed by heart of palm, shrimp, oil seeds and small-scale agriculture. However, land conflicts take place on the island.

Serraria Island is contained in the 59,985-square-kilometre (23,160 sq mi) Marajó Archipelago Environmental Protection Area, a sustainable-use conservation unit established in 1989 to protect the environment of the region.
