= Browneopsis excelsa =

Conservation status
- Vulnerable (IUCN 2.3)

Scientific classification
- Kingdom: Plantae
- Clade: Tracheophytes
- Clade: Angiosperms
- Clade: Eudicots
- Clade: Rosids
- Order: Fabales
- Family: Fabaceae
- Genus: Browneopsis
- Species: B. excelsa

Binomial name
- Browneopsis excelsa Pitt.

Species of legume

Browneopsis excelsa is a species of plant in the family Fabaceae. It is found in Colombia, Panama, and Peru. It is threatened by habitat loss.
