= Browneopsis macrofoliolata =

Conservation status
- Critically Endangered (IUCN 3.1)

Scientific classification
- Kingdom: Plantae
- Clade: Tracheophytes
- Clade: Angiosperms
- Clade: Eudicots
- Clade: Rosids
- Order: Fabales
- Family: Fabaceae
- Genus: Browneopsis
- Species: B. macrofoliolata

Binomial name
- Browneopsis macrofoliolata Klitgaard

Species of legume

Browneopsis macrofoliolata is a species of plant in the family Fabaceae. It is found only in Ecuador. Its natural habitat is subtropical or tropical moist montane forests.
