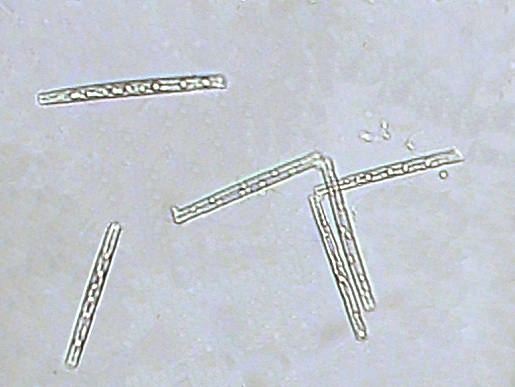
- Thalasionema nitzhioides

Scientific classification
- Domain: Eukaryota
- Clade: Diaphoretickes
- Clade: Sar
- Clade: Stramenopiles
- Phylum: Gyrista
- Subphylum: Ochrophytina
- Class: Bacillariophyceae
- Order: Thalassionematales
- Family: Thalassionemataceae
- Genus: Thalassionema; A. Grunow ex C. Mereschkowsky 1902

= Thalassionema =

Genus of single-celled organisms

Thalassionema is a genus of Chromista belonging to the family Thalassionemataceae.

The genus was described in 1902 by Grunow ex Mereschkowsky.

Species:

- Thalassionema nitzschioides Grunow, 1862
