= Atuá River =

River in Pará, Brazil

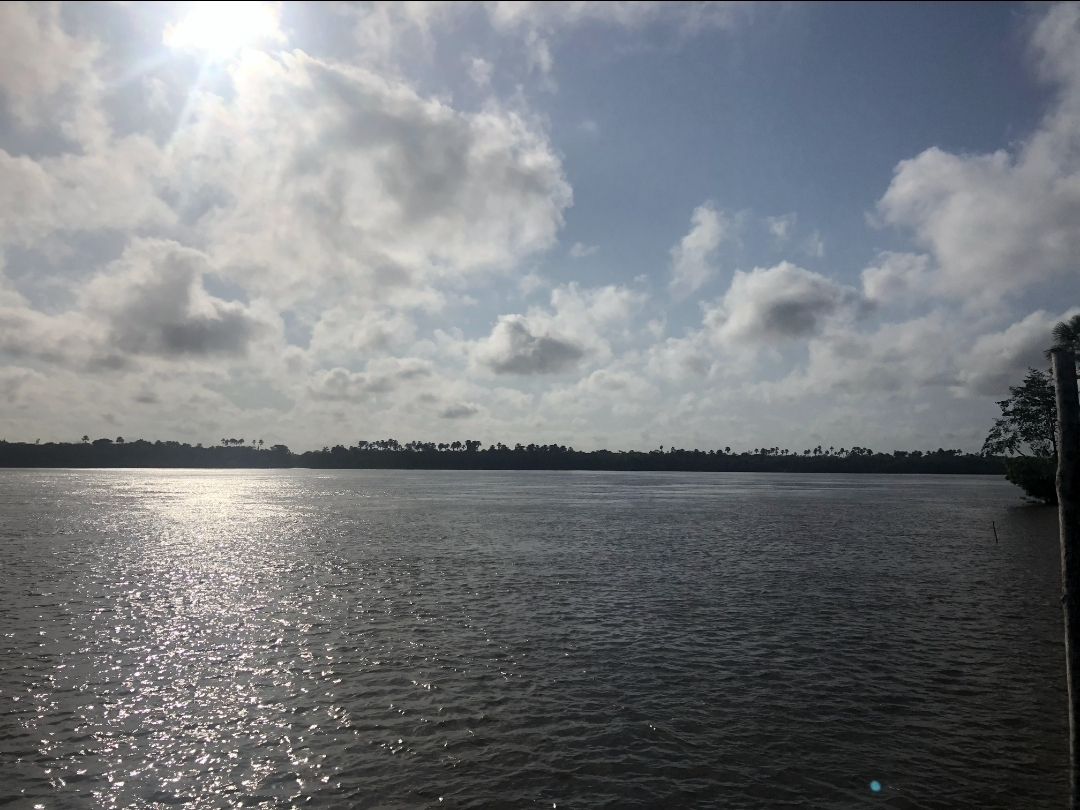
- The Atuá in the morning hours

Location
- Country: Brazil
- State: Pará

Physical characteristics
- Mouth
  - location: Pará River
  - coordinates: 1°33′S 49°4′W
- Basin size: 3,972 km^{2} (1,534 sq mi)

Basin features
- Tributaries
  - left: Anabiju River

The Atuá River (Portuguese: Rio Atuá) is a river of Marajó, which itself is an island in the Amazon Delta. It is located in the state Pará in northern Brazil.

Its main tributary on the left is the Anabiju River. Close to the same location, the Muaná River branches off at its right hand side. The direction of the water flow between these rivers highly depends on the tides of the Amazon and on the variation between wet and dry seasons.

Since the Atuá is relatively deep and navigable for most of its length, it fulfills an important role for transportation in the region. The Atuá enters the Pará River opposite the mouth of the Tocantins River. There are two islands close to its mouth, called Ilha do Palheta and Atuá Island.

The banks of the Atuá are lined with grassy fields with some low trees. Their soils consist of sand and clay, and are subject to flooding only during periods of heavy rainfall. Principal economic activities along the river are traditional agriculture, the collection of açaí and fishery.

A canal has been projected between the Atuá and the Anajás River to facilitate transport between Belém and Amapá, but it hasn't materialised.

== See also ==
- List of rivers of Pará
