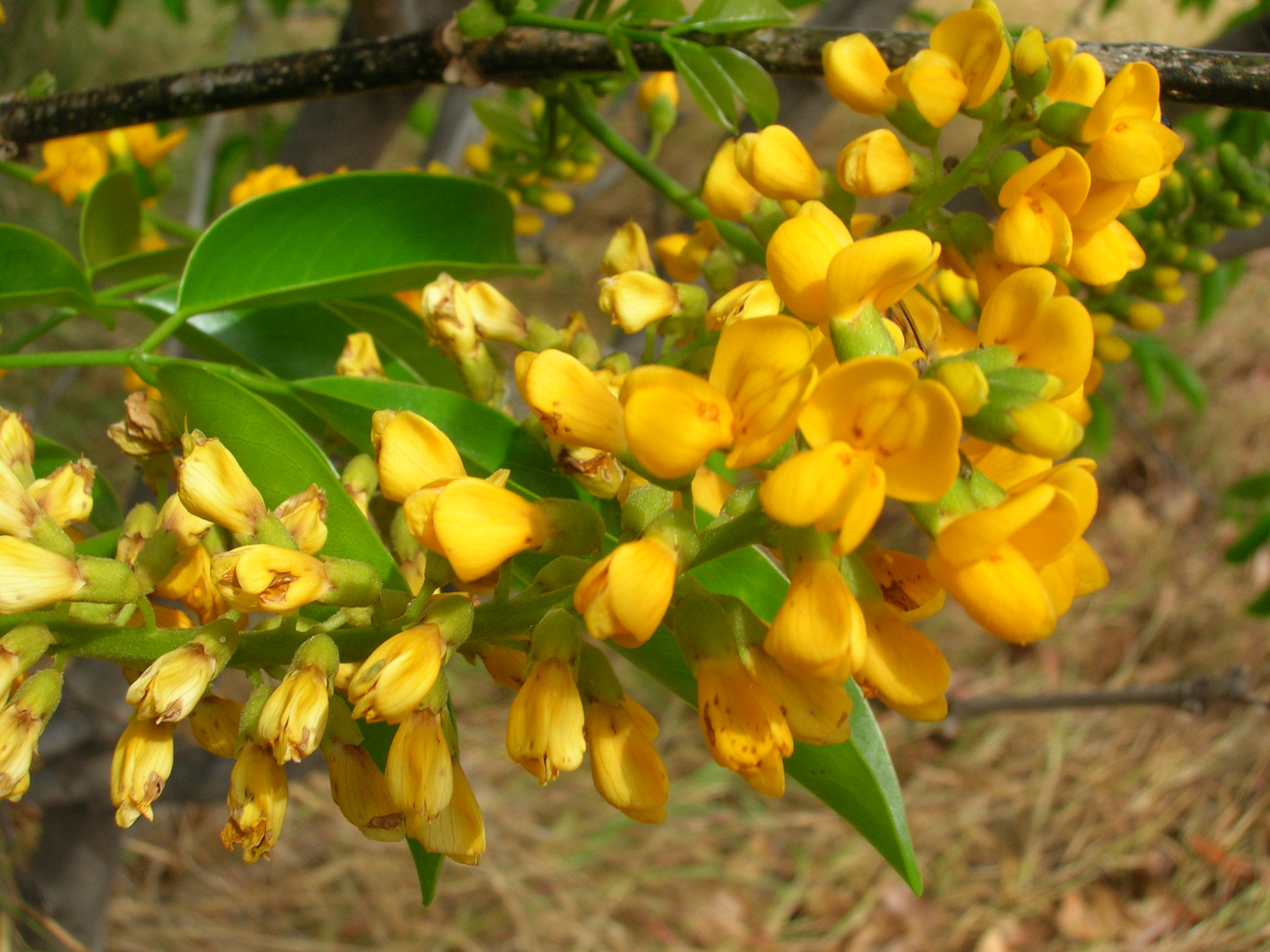
- Platymiscium stipulare

Scientific classification
- Kingdom: Plantae
- Clade: Tracheophytes
- Clade: Angiosperms
- Clade: Eudicots
- Clade: Rosids
- Order: Fabales
- Family: Fabaceae
- Subfamily: Faboideae
- Tribe: Dalbergieae
- Genus: Platymiscium; Vogel

Species
- See text.
- Range of the genus Platymiscium.

= Platymiscium =

Genus of legumes

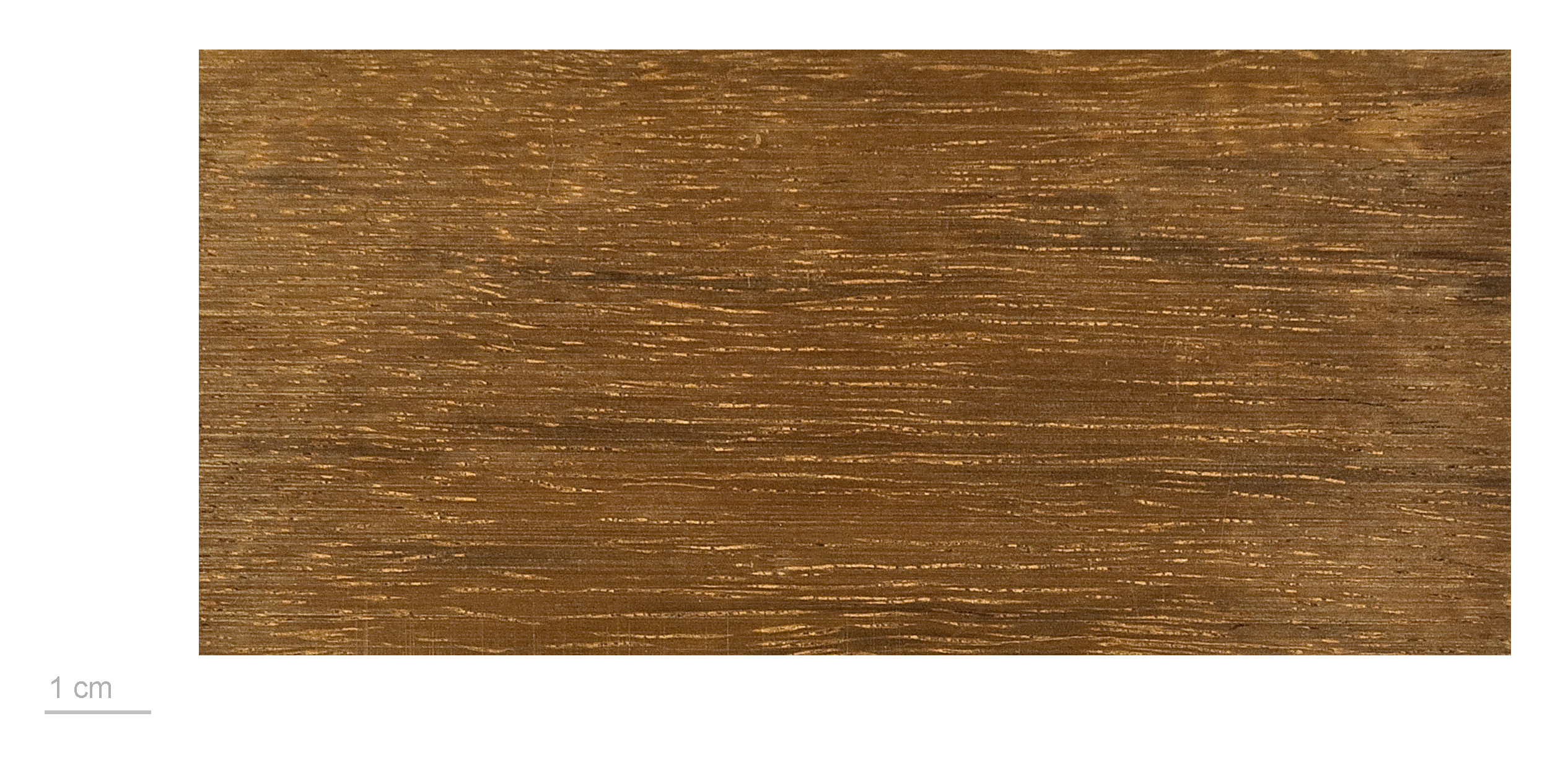
Wood from a Platymiscium sp.

Platymiscium is a genus of flowering plants in the family Fabaceae, and was recently assigned to the informal monophyletic Pterocarpus clade within the Dalbergieae. It has a Neotropical distribution, from northern Mexico to southern Brazil. Platymiscium is the only genus in the family with opposite leaves in all its species. Its wood has various uses, mostly for constructions and furniture. The wood is also sometimes referred to as Granadillo, Macacauba, Macawood, Hormigo, or Orange Agate.

== Species ==
Platymiscium comprises the following species:

- Platymiscium albertinae Standl. & L. O. Williams
- Platymiscium calyptratum M. Sousa & Klitg.
- Platymiscium curuense N. Zamora and Klitg.
- Platymiscium darienense Dwyer
- Platymiscium dimorphandrum Donn. Smith ex Donn. Smith
- Platymiscium filipes Benth.
- Platymiscium floribundum Vogel
  - var. floribundum Vogel.
  - var. latifolium (Benth.) Benth.
  - var. nitens (Vogel) Klitgaard
  - var. obtusifolium (Harms) Klitgaard
- Platymiscium gracile Benth.
- Platymiscium hebestachyum Benth.
- Platymiscium jejunum Klitg.
- Platymiscium lasiocarpum Sandwith
- Platymiscium parviflorum Benth.
- Platymiscium pinnatum (Jacq.) Dugand
  - subsp. pinnatum (Jacq.) Dugand
    - var. diadelphum (S. F. Blake) Klitg.
    - var. pinnatum (Jacq.) Dugand
    - var. ulei (Harms ex Harms) Klitgaard
  - subsp. polystachyum (Benth.) Klitg.
- Platymiscium pubescens Micheli
  - subsp. fragrans (Rusby) Klitgaard
  - subsp. pubescens Micheli
  - subsp. zehntneri (Harms) Klitgaard
- Platymiscium speciosum Vogel
- Platymiscium stipulare Benth. ex Benth.
- Platymiscium trifoliolatum Benth. ex Benth.
- Platymiscium trinitatis Benth.
  - var. duckei (Huber) Klitgaard
  - var. nigrum (Ducke) Klitgaard
  - var. trinitatis Benth.
- Platymiscium yucatanum Standl.
