= Treaty of the Mapuá =

- Signed: August 27, 1659
- Location: Mapuá River, Marajó Island; 1°7′S 50°18′W
- Expiration: 1661 (de facto)
- Parties: Portuguese Jesuits led by António Vieira; Indigenous people of the Marajó Archipelago
- Language: Portuguese

The Treaty of the Mapuá (Portuguese: Tratado do Mapuá) was a peace treaty sworn in August 1659 by various indigenous peoples who inhabited the Marajó Archipelago at the mouth of the Amazon River in front of Portuguese Jesuits led by António Vieira. The treaty was sworn in a week-long ceremony held on the banks of the Mapuá River on Marajó Island.

For the Portuguese, the treaty meant an end to Dutch ambitions in the Amazon Delta and an important expansion west of the Tordesillas line. The treaty lasted less than two years due to a revolt by Portuguese colonists in Belém because of a perceived lack of slave labour. As a result of subsequent hostilities, many indigenous people fled Marajó island, mainly to present-day Amapá and French Guiana.

== Background ==
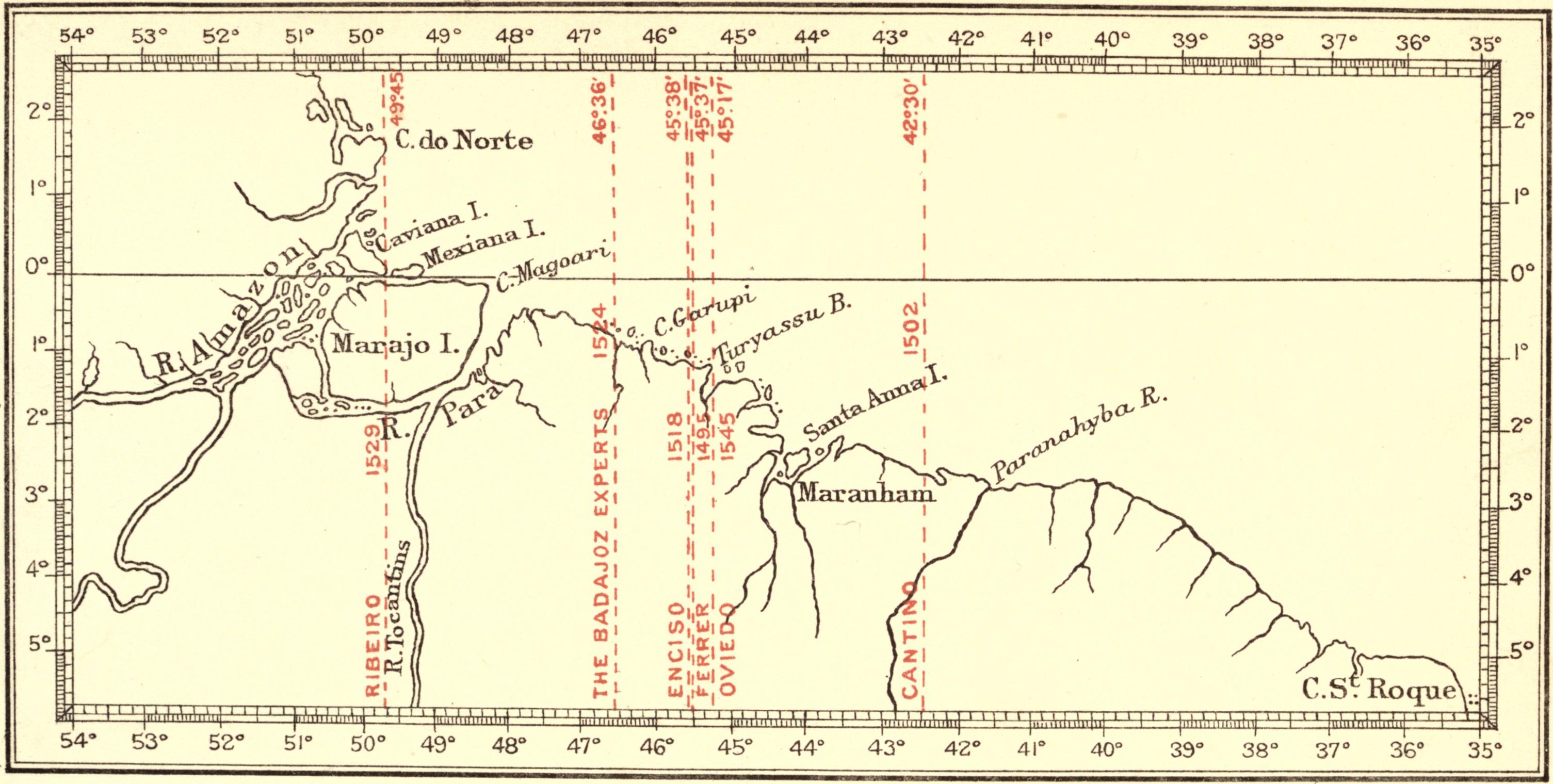
Various reckonings of the Tordesillas line on a map by Henry Harrisse. The westernmost line placed by Diogo Ribeiro runs through Marajó Island.

The Treaty of Tordesillas, signed in 1494 and ratified by Pope Julius II in 1506, had divided the New World between the Kingdom of Portugal and the Crown of Castile. The line was drawn 370 leagues (around 600 km) west of Cape Verde. The problem was knowing where exactly this line was, as the treaty did not specify the exact length of a league, or which of the Cape Verdean islands was intended. The Portuguese naturally adopted an interpretation that claimed the line at its most Western location, which makes it run through the Marajó Archipelago at the mouth of the Amazon River. This put the region at the frontier of their ambitions to establish what later became Colonial Brazil.

By the 17th Century, their struggle for dominance in the archipelago was less with the Spanish, but instead with the French (who were operating from Cayenne) and the Dutch. Especially the trade between indigenous peoples and the Dutch of manatees and other goods was a source of contention. The Portuguese intended to dominate the people on the numerous islands, trying to enslave them and organising various raids and military expeditions against them. At the same time, each European colonial power needed the support of their numbers.

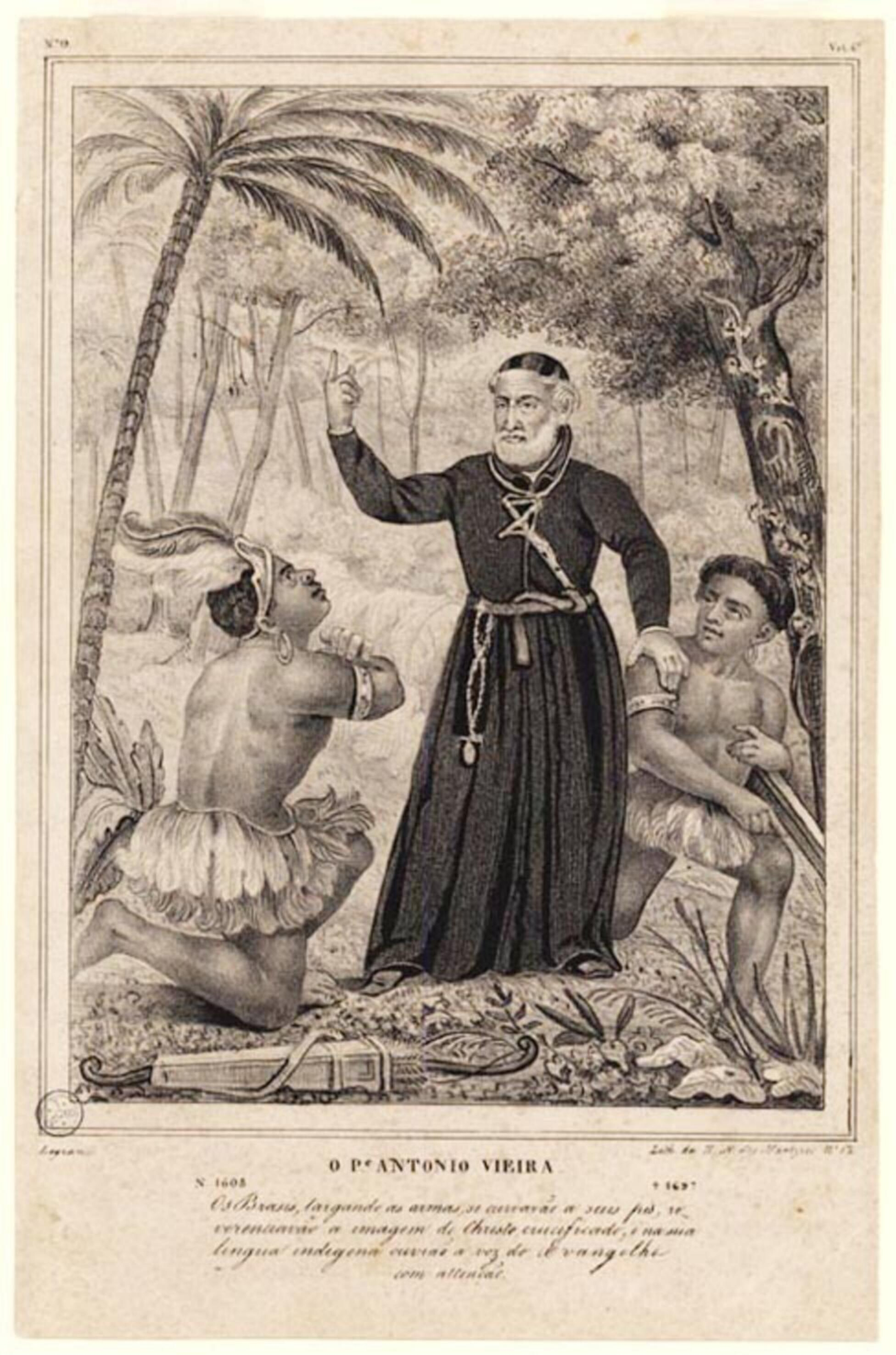
António Vieira preaching (C. Legrand, 1839)

In 1652, Jesuit missionary António Vieira arrived in Belém. His standing with the Portuguese there was not very good, as in 1648 he had recommended handing over the State of Maranhão, which contained the region, to the Dutch in exchange for the Captaincy of Pernambuco. However, after setting sail for Lisbon in June 1654, he obtained a series of decrees from King John IV in April 1655 which placed the Catholic missions in the region under the Jesuits, with himself as their superior. The decrees also prohibited the enslavement of the indigenous peoples, except in certain specified cases. With these in hand, Vieira returned to Belém and managed to convince the Portuguese to abolish the laws that sanctioned slavery.

At least three missions were undertaken by Jesuit priests, travelling for months deep into the Amazon forest by canoe with large entourages of christianised indigenous people and Portuguese soldiers. Their intent was to free indigenous slaves, but also to pressure them to move into villages that the Jesuits had set up for them and to punish those that opposed the Portuguese. At the same time, military expeditions against the indigenous peoples continued to be organised. As an example, the Portuguese prepared another armed expedition from Belém against the Aruã and other indigenous groups in 1658.

== Signing of the treaty ==
In an attempt to pacify the situation, at Christmas in 1658 Vieira sent two christened indigenous leaders as representatives to Marajó to propose a treaty. The Portuguese received an answer on Ash Wednesday (16 February 1659), when several indigenous leaders accompanied by a large group of their people arrived unexpectedly in Belém. The feast of Saint John (23 June) was proposed for signing a treaty, but due to an illness of Vieira, the ceremony was postponed until August.

The gathering took place at the Mapuá River, deep into Marajó Island, from 22 to 27 August 1659. According to Vieira, the Portuguese travelled unarmed, accompanied by a large group of christianised indigenous people. When they arrived at the Mapuá, the people there had already made a make-shift church of mud and palm leaves, dedicated to Christ. They also returned to the Portuguese a metal statuette of Christ, that they had taken from them four years earlier. Upon arrival, Vieira celebrated a Te Deum service in the church. The next days where largely spent waiting for most indigenous delegations to arrive, as many had to travel for days in their canoes to reach the location.

In the collective memory of the people of Marajó, representatives of seven indigenous nations were present at the ceremony, where this number may have been chosen for symbolic reasons. Vieira doesn't mention the number seven in his writings, but he does give a list of the nations that attended:

1. Mamaianaz people
2. Aruã people
3. Anajá people
4. Mapuá people
5. Gujará people
6. Pixipixi people
7. Tricuju people

Vieira mentions in his writings only one of the indigenous leaders who attended by name, namely Chief Piyé of the Aruã who lived on the island Caviana. In his writings, Vieira calls him "the most intelligent of all" of those present. Piyé became mostly known for his refusal to swear an oath of obedience to the King of Portugal during the ceremony, arguing that it was the Portuguese who had been unfaithful to their King for their lack of friendship and obedience.

In spite of these objections the chief of each nation swore the following oath, after which they kissed Vieira's hand:

Portuguese: Eu Fulano, Principal de tal nação, em meu nome, e de todos meus súbditos e descendentes, prometo a Deus e ao Rei de Portugal a Fé de Nosso Senhor Jesus Cristo, e de ser (como já sou de hoje em diante) vassalo de Sua Majestade, e de ter perpétua paz com os Portugueses, sendo amigo de todos seus amigos, e inimigo de todos seus inimigos; e me obrigo de assim o guardar inteiramente para sempre.

[I, Chief of my Nation, in my own name and on behalf of all my subjects and descendants do promise to God and to the King of Portugal the Faith of Our Lord Jesus Christ; and I promise to be (as I am already, from this day forward) a vassal of His Majesty, and to maintain perpetual peace with the Portuguese, being a friend to all their friends and an enemy to all their enemies; and I bind myself to observe this pledge fully and forever.]

After this, Vieira celebrated another Te Deum and a cross was erected. According to Vieira, the Portuguese fired a salute with empty cannons and various indigenous fighters broke their arrows and threw them into the river.

== Aftermath ==
In practice, the treaty granted the Portuguese the right of unhindered passage of their canoes through the furo river channels around Breves. This was an important trade route from Belém to Macapá and further to French Guiana. It also gave them the right to establish Jesuit missions on Marajó.

On 11 February 1660, Vieira sent a letter to the new King Afonso VI, informing him of the treaty. It was received with triumph in Lisbon, as it established the integration of the mouth of the Amazon into the State of Maranhão and Grão-Pará. It effectively ended Dutch ambitions in the region, putting it in the sphere of Portuguese America. After the treaty was sworn, the Portuguese immediately started christianising the indigenous peoples in the area. In reaction, many fled to Brazilian Guiana (a region coinciding with the present-day state Amapá) and French Guiana.

In 1661, the Portuguese in Belém revolted because of a shortage of slaves, which they attributed to the Jesuits. The colonists began actively to oppose Vieira, and were joined by members of the secular clergy and other Catholic Orders who were envious of their monopoly in governing the indigenous people. They reinstated slavery, effectively putting an end to the treaty after only two years. Hostilities against the various indigenous peoples continued afterwards. The revolt further weakened the standing of Vieira, and he and 31 other Jesuits were expelled from the region in the same year.

== Present day ==
The location where the ceremony took place is in the current municipality of Breves, near a community called Vila Amélia. The place is on the edge of the Mapuá Extractive Reserve, a sustainable use protected area established in 2005. There is an indigenous cemetery at the spot where the treaty was sworn.

The treaty and the circumstances surrounding it are studied academically as an example of utopian thinking, of which the influence extends beyond the island Marajó. In doing this, researchers rely on the collective memory of those who live along the river to have a better understanding of what happened at the ceremony. In the present day, Piyé's refusal is still seen as an example of indigenous defiance.
