= Anabiju River =

- Location within Brazil

Location
- Country: Brazil
- State: Pará

Physical characteristics
- Mouth
  - location: Atuá River
  - coordinates: 1°24′50″S 49°9′15″W

The Anabiju River (Portuguese: Rio Anabiju) is a river of Marajó, which itself is an island in the Amazon Delta. It is located in the state Pará in northern Brazil, where it forms the border between the municipalities Ponta de Pedras and Muaná. The Anabiju is a tributary of the Atuá River. Its main tributaries are the Anabiju-mirim River and a stream called Igarapé Matapari. In the 1980s, there were plans to connect the Anabiju to the Anajás River through a canal.

The middle and upper parts of the Anabiju run through the transition zone between savannas and forests on the Island Marajó. The white-tailed deer is known to browse here, especially along the right bank of the river.

== See also ==
- List of rivers of Pará
