= Mapuá River =

- Location within Brazil

Location
- Country: Brazil
- State: Pará

Physical characteristics
- Mouth
  - location: Aramá River
  - coordinates: 1.065013°S 50.550486°W

The Mapuá River (Portuguese: Rio Mapuá) is a river of Marajó, which itself is an island in the Amazon Delta. It is located in the state Pará in northern Brazil and is a left tributary of the Aramá River.

== Course ==
The Mapuá originates in the flooded igapó forests and lakes between the Anajás River and some branches of the Canaticu River. Some of its tributaries are Braço do Socó, Braço do Jacaré and Igarapé Fundo. Navigation on the Mapuá is possible, but care needs to be taken because of many floating tree branches. It enters the Aramá opposite Basílio Island in that river.

The Mapuá runs along the southern boundary of the Mapuá Extractive Reserve. The Aramá, of which it is a left tributary, forms the northern boundary of the reserve. The reserve contains sheets of tidal water and mangroves. The reserve is mostly lowland floodplain, with some terra firma in the centre of the territory.

== History ==
From 22 to 27 August 1659, a ceremony was held at the banks of the river that cumulated the signing of the Treaty of the Mapuá between the Portuguese Jesuits led by António Vieira and various indigenous peoples who inhabited the Marajó Archipelago, including the Aruã. Vieira had called representatives of various peoples together at a location near a community called Vila Amélia (1°7′S 50°18′W). Most participants must have travelled in canoes for days to reach this place. In the present day, there is still an indigenous cemetery at the spot where the treaty was signed.

== See also ==
- List of rivers of Pará
