= Platymiscium albertinae =

Conservation status
- Critically Endangered (IUCN 3.1)

Scientific classification
- Kingdom: Plantae
- Clade: Tracheophytes
- Clade: Angiosperms
- Clade: Eudicots
- Clade: Rosids
- Order: Fabales
- Family: Fabaceae
- Subfamily: Faboideae
- Genus: Platymiscium
- Species: P. albertinae

Binomial name
- Platymiscium albertinae Standley & L.O. Williams
- Range of Platymiscium albertinae.

Species of legume

Platymiscium albertinae is a species of plant in the family Fabaceae. It is found only in Honduras. It is threatened by habitat loss.
