= Afuá =

Municipality in Pará, Brazil

- Municipality
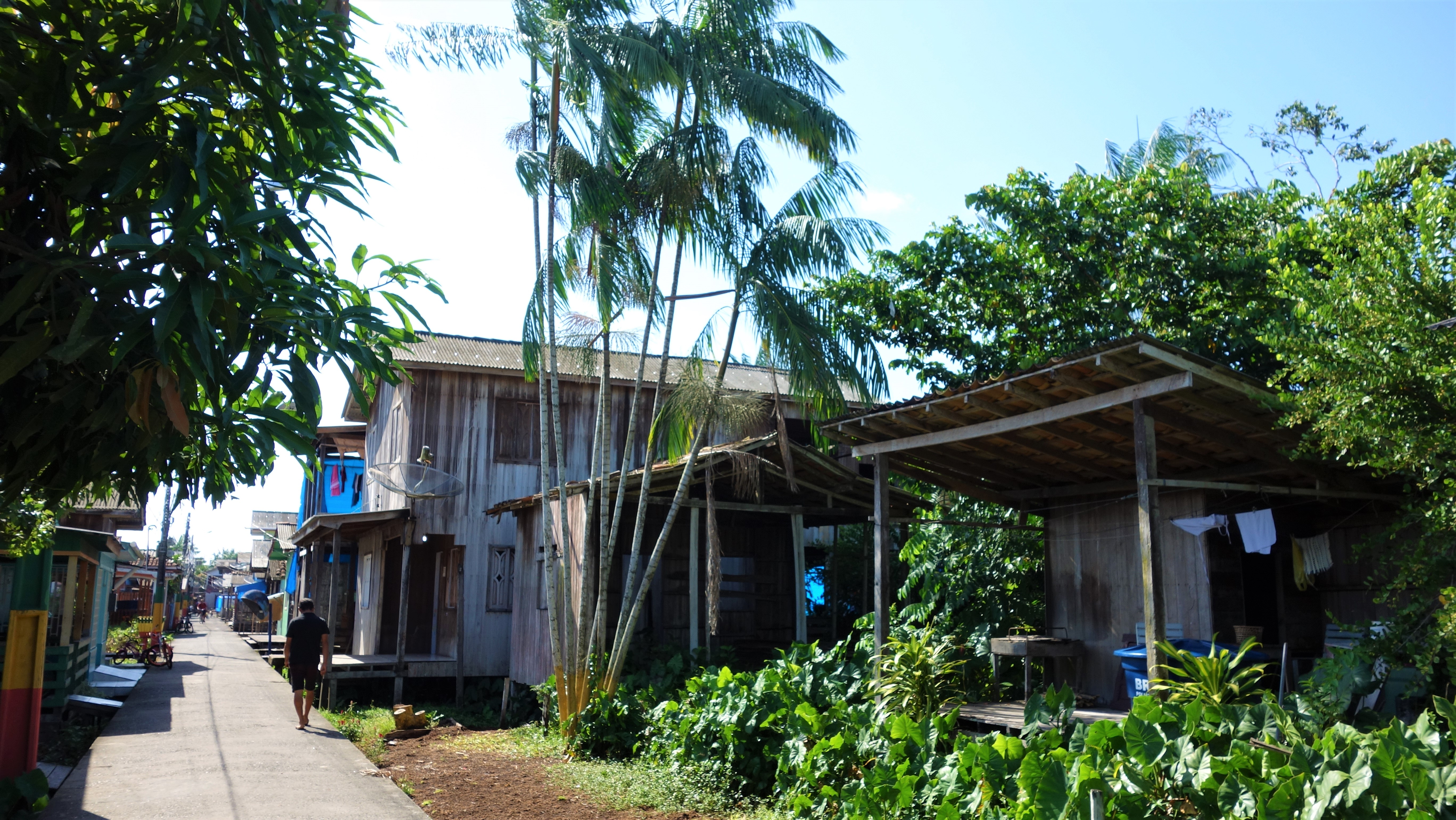

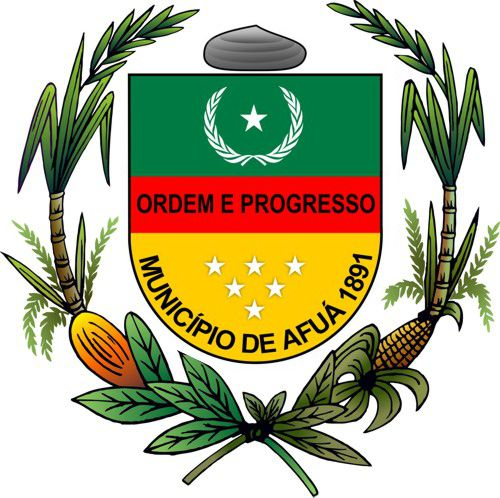
- Flag Coat of arms

- Location in the State of Pará
- Coordinates: 00°09′25″S 50°23′13″W
- Country: Brazil
- Region: North
- State: Pará
- Founded: August 2, 1891

Area
  - Total: 8,372.772 km^{2} (3,232.745 sq mi)
- Elevation: 8 m (26 ft)

Population (2020)
  - Total: 39,567
  - Density: 4.4/km^{2} (11/sq mi)
- Time zone: UTC−3 (BRT)
- Postal Code: 68890-000

Afuá is a Brazilian municipality located in the state of Pará. Its population as of 2020 is estimated to be 39,567 people. The area of the municipality is 8,372.772 km^{2}. The city belongs to the mesoregion Marajó and to the microregion of Furos de Breves.

== Geography ==
The town of Afuá is situated on an internal river bay on Marajó, where various rivers that flow on this island come together:

- Afuá River
- Marajozinho River
- Cajuúna River
- The Santana Channel (Canal do Santana) of the Cajari River
- Furo Piraiauara

The town is heavily influenced by the tides of these rivers. Most of them flow into the Vieira Grande Bay, which connects to the Amazon River. In the rainy season the waters in the bay rise, causing the water flow in these rivers to change direction, which leads to large-scale flooding of the town.

Because of this, most houses are built on stilts (called palafitas in Portuguese) and traffic is mainly by boat. The town has been off-limits to cars since 2002, earning Afuá the epithet "The Venice of Marajó" (Veneza Marajoara). From outside the town is only accessible by boat, though there is an airstrip that is often underwater. The town's mayor has described it as a model for net-zero emissions.

The various rivers form several islands within the larger island Marajó, such as Afuá Island, Cajuúna Island and Piraiauara Island. Further out, a number of islands in the Vieira Grande Bay are part of the municipality, the largest of which is Serraria Island.

The municipality is contained in the 59,985-square-kilometre (23,160 sq mi) Marajó Archipelago Environmental Protection Area, a sustainable use conservation unit established in 1989 to protect the environment of the delta region. The municipality contains the 65,181-hectare (161,070-acre) Charapucu State Park, a strictly protected conservation unit created in 2010.

== See also ==
- List of municipalities in Pará
