= Anajás River =

Coordinates: 0°37′48″S 50°40′37″W

- Location within Brazil

Location
- Country: Brazil
- State: Pará

Physical characteristics
- Source
  - location: Mondongo swamps, Marajó
- Mouth
  - location: Vieira Grande Bay
- Length: 310 km (190 mi)
- Basin size: 24,083 km^{2} (9,298 sq mi)

Basin features
- Tributaries
  - left: Guajará River, Cururu River, Jacaré River
  - right: Moções River

The Anajás River (Portuguese: Rio Anajás) is a river of Marajó, which itself is an island in the Amazon Delta. It is located in the state Pará in northern Brazil. The name Anajás relates to the maripa fruit, which is called inajá in Brazil.

== Course ==
The source of the Anajás is in Ponta de Pedras municipality, in the swamp areas called mondongos that are normally flooded during the wet season. It mainly flows in a westerly direction. Its main tributary is the Moções River on its right bank. It joins the Anajás opposite the main town along the river, which is also called Anajás. To the south of the river is an area of flooded igapó forests.

Like many rivers on Marajó, the Anajás is a tidal river. Twice a day during high tide, it receives an influx of combined waters from the Atlantic Ocean and the Amazon River (through the Vieira Grande Bay), causing its headwaters to become brackish. Especially in the dry months from October to December, many of its tributaries dry up during low tides. For the people living along the river, including in the town of Anajás, these cycles influence transportation, fishing and the availability of drinking water.

== History ==
Excavations attest to the expansion of the Marajoara culture along the Anajás River between 700 and 1100 AD. The inhabitants occupied river headwaters, lakes and seasonally flooded areas and reproduced hydraulic control systems to optimise the capture of water, in a system of dams and reservoirs. Platforms were constructed of beaten earth for housing, ceremonies and festivals.

In his ethno-historical maps of 1938–1945, Nimuendajú referred to the indigenous people along the river as the Anajá, placing them in the seventeenth century and classifying their language as "unknown". The Anajá were present when the Treaty of the Mapuá was sworn by various indigenous peoples in front of Portuguese Jesuits led by António Vieira in August 1659. Ceramics from the Marajoara culture are still regularly discovered along the river, especially when its tributaries run dry.

Since the 1980s, there have been plans for canals to connect the Anajás to the Atuá River or its tributary the Anabiju to facilitate transport between Belém and Macapá, but these haven't materialised.

== See also ==
- List of rivers of Pará
