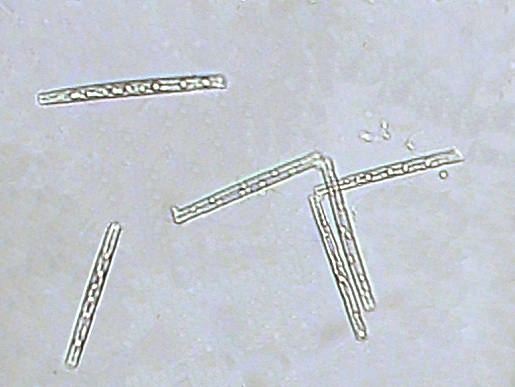

Scientific classification
- Domain: Eukaryota
- Clade: Diaphoretickes
- Clade: Sar
- Clade: Stramenopiles
- Phylum: Gyrista
- Subphylum: Ochrophytina
- Class: Bacillariophyceae
- Subclass: Fragilariophycidae
- Superorder: Fragilariophycanae
- Order: Thalassionematales
- Family: Thalassionemataceae
- Genus: Thalassionema
- Species: T. nitzschioides

Binomial name
- Thalassionema nitzschioides (Grunow) Mereschkowsky 1902

= Thalassionema nitzschioides =

Species of single-celled organism

Thalassionema nitzschioides is a type of phytoplankton belonging to the pennate diatom group.

== Characteristics ==
- Length (apical axis): 10 - 110 μm
- Width: 2 - 4 μm
- Height: 3 - 8 μm
- Marginal areolae: 10 - 12 in 10 μm

Thalassionema nitzschioides are a yellow brown color.

Their cells are straight and linear and they connect to form zigzagging chains. The cells are rectangular shaped, with rounded ends, and the cells are connected at the ends of each other. “Sometimes an apical spine is present and the marginal ornamentation is visible as ribs.”

== Global distribution ==
Thalassionema nitzschioides can be found all over the world except in polar regions along shallow coastal ocean waters. They occur all year round with higher concentrations in the spring and are usually found in high concentrations. Salinity and temperature conditions for optimal growth rate are 12-38 PPT and 15 °C respectively.
