= Mapuá Extractive Reserve =

- Reserva Extrativista Mapuá
- IUCN category VI (protected area with sustainable use of natural resources)
- Location within Brazil
- Coordinates: 1°04′46″S 50°14′34″W
- Area: 93,746.34 hectares (231,652.3 acres)
- Designation: Extractive reserve
- Created: 20 May 2005
- Administrator: Chico Mendes Institute for Biodiversity Conservation

The Mapuá Extractive Reserve (Portuguese: Reserva Extrativista Mapuá) is an extractive reserve in the state of Pará, Brazil.

== Location ==
The Mapuá Extractive Reserve is in the municipality of Breves, Pará. It is on the island of Marajó to the northwest of Belém in the delta region where the Amazon and Tocantins rivers empty into the Atlantic Ocean. It is contained within the 5,998,570 hectares (14,822,800 acres) Marajó Archipelago Environmental Protection Area, established in 1989. It has an area of 93,746.34 hectares (231,652.3 acres). The Mapuá River, a left tributary of the Aramã, runs along the reserve's southern boundary. The Aramá River forms the northern boundary in the western part of the reserve. It adjoins the Terra Grande-Pracuúba Extractive Reserve to the east.

The reserve is in the Amazon biome. It contains sheets of tidal water and mangroves. The reserve is mostly lowland floodplain, with some terra firma in the centre of the territory. It is laced with rivers, stream, channels and lakes. The main rivers are the Mapuá, Aramã and Lado do Jacaré.

== History ==
The Mapuá Extractive Reserve was created by presidential decree on 20 May 2005. It is administered by the Chico Mendes Institute for Biodiversity Conservation (ICMBio). It is classed as IUCN protected area category VI (protected area with sustainable use of natural resources). The objective is to ensure the survival of the traditional people, their customs and way of life, and to ensure regional biodiversity. The reserve was one of several created by president Luiz Inácio Lula da Silva at the same time, influenced by the National Council of Extractive Populations (CNS). The conservation unit is supported by the Amazon Region Protected Areas Program.

The non-profit Residents Association of the Mapuá Extractive Reserve (AMOREMA) was created on 5 November 2005, based in the Bom Jesus community. INCRA recognised the reserve on 20 December 2007 as an area to support 400 families of small rural producers. The deliberative council was created on 25 June 2008. The reserve was assigned to ICMBio on 15 March 2010. On 23 March 2010 ICMBio granted a concession to use the reserve to AMOREMA, and on 27 April 2016 the state of Pará recognized AMOREMA as a utility.

== People and economy ==
The families in the reserve traditionally live by subsistence agriculture, gathering forest products, hunting and artisanal fishing. Fruits collected from the forest include açaí, bacaba, andiroba and Brazil nut. There are fourteen riverside communities in the reserve: Santíssima Trindade, São Benedito Aramã, São Sebastião Mapuá, Bom Jesus, Vila Amélia, Santa Rita, Nazaré do Socó, São José, São Benedito Mapuá, Santa Maria, São Sebastião Canta Galo, Assembléia de Deus, Nazaré do Jacaré and Perpétuo Socorro. Vila Amélia is the place were the Treaty of the Mapuá was signed in August 1659.

== Sources ==
- APA Arquipélago do Marajó (in Portuguese), ISA: Instituto Socioambiental
- Full list: PAs supported by ARPA, ARPA
- Giovanni Salera Júnior (25 December 2010), "AMOREMA – Associação de Moradores da Reserva Extrativista Mapuá", Voz do Marajó (in Portuguese)
- Resex Mapuá (in Portuguese), Chico Mendes Institute for Biodiversity Conservation
- RESEX Mapuá (in Portuguese), ISA: Instituto Socioambiental
- Unidade de Conservação: Reserva Extrativista Mapuá (in Portuguese), MMA: Ministério do Meio Ambiente
