= Platymiscium filipes =

Scientific classification
- Kingdom: Plantae
- Clade: Tracheophytes
- Clade: Angiosperms
- Clade: Eudicots
- Clade: Rosids
- Order: Fabales
- Family: Fabaceae
- Subfamily: Faboideae
- Genus: Platymiscium
- Species: P. filipes

Binomial name
- Platymiscium filipes Benth.
- Range of Platymiscium filipes

Species of flowering plant

Platymiscium filipes is a species of flowering plant belonging to the family Fabaceae.

Its native range is French Guiana to Northern Brazil.
