= Platymiscium parviflorum =

Conservation status
- Endangered (IUCN 2.3)

Scientific classification
- Kingdom: Plantae
- Clade: Tracheophytes
- Clade: Angiosperms
- Clade: Eudicots
- Clade: Rosids
- Order: Fabales
- Family: Fabaceae
- Subfamily: Faboideae
- Genus: Platymiscium
- Species: P. parviflorum

Binomial name
- Platymiscium parviflorum Benth.

Synonyms
- Platymiscium pleiostachyum Donn.Sm.

Species of legume

Platymiscium parviflorum, synonym Platymiscium pleiostachyum, is a species of plant in the family Fabaceae. It is found in Central America: Costa Rica, El Salvador, Guatemala, Honduras and Nicaragua. It is threatened by habitat loss.
