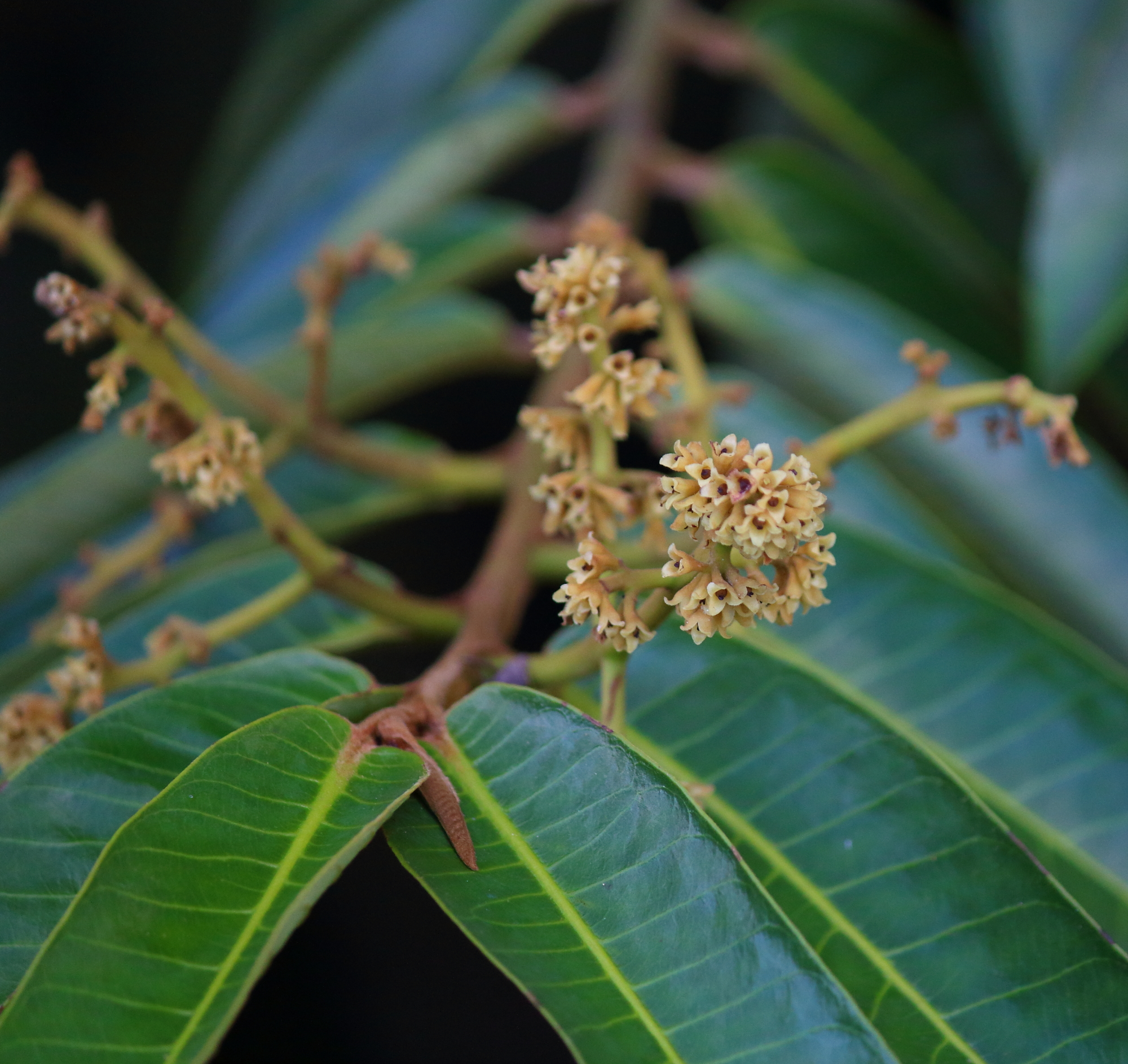

Conservation status
- Least Concern (IUCN 3.1)

Scientific classification
- Kingdom: Plantae
- Clade: Embryophytes
- Clade: Tracheophytes
- Clade: Spermatophytes
- Clade: Angiosperms
- Clade: Magnoliids
- Order: Magnoliales
- Family: Myristicaceae
- Genus: Virola
- Species: V. surinamensis

Binomial name
- Virola surinamensis (Rol. ex Rottb.) Warb.

Synonyms
- Myristica americana Rol. ex Rottb.; Myristica fatua Sw.; Myristica gracilis A.DC.; Myristica sebifera var. longifolia Lam.; Myristica surinamensis Rol. ex Rottb.; Palala gracilis (A.DC.) Kuntze; Palala surinamensis (Rol. ex Rottb.) Kuntze; Virola carinata var. gracilis (A.DC.) Warb.; Virola glaziovii Warb.; Virola glazovii var. latifolia Malme

= Virola surinamensis =

Species of tree

Virola surinamensis, known commonly as baboonwood, ucuuba, ucuhuba and chalviande, is a species of flowering plant in the family Myristicaceae. It is found in Bolivia, northern and central Brazil, Colombia, Ecuador, French Guiana, Guyana, Peru, Suriname, Trinidad and Tobago, and Venezuela. It has also been naturalized in the Caribbean. Its natural habitats are subtropical or tropical moist lowland forests, subtropical or tropical swamps, and heavily degraded former forest. Although the species is listed as threatened due to habitat loss by the IUCN, it is a common tree species found throughout Central and South America.

Virola surinamensis grows 25–40 m (82–131 ft) tall. The leaves are 10–22 cm (3.9–8.7 in) long and 2–5 cm (0.79–1.97 in) wide. The fruits are ellipsoidal to subglobular, measuring about 13–21 mm (0.51–0.83 in) long and 11–18 mm (0.43–0.71 in) in diameter.

== Uses ==
The tree is harvested for its wood. It is also a source of traditional medicinal remedies for intestinal worms. The Amazon Indians Waiãpi living in the West of Amapá State of Brazil, treat malaria with an inhalation of vapor obtained from leaves of Virola surinamensis.

=== Ucuhuba seed oil ===
Ucuhuba seed oil is the oil extracted from the seed. It contains 13% lauric acid, 69% myristic acid, 7% palmitic acid, and traces of oleic acid and linoleic acid. Myristic and lauric acids comprised 91.3 mole % of the total fatty acids. Additional saturated fatty acids such as decanoic acid and stearic acid are minor components.

=== Ucuhuba butter ===
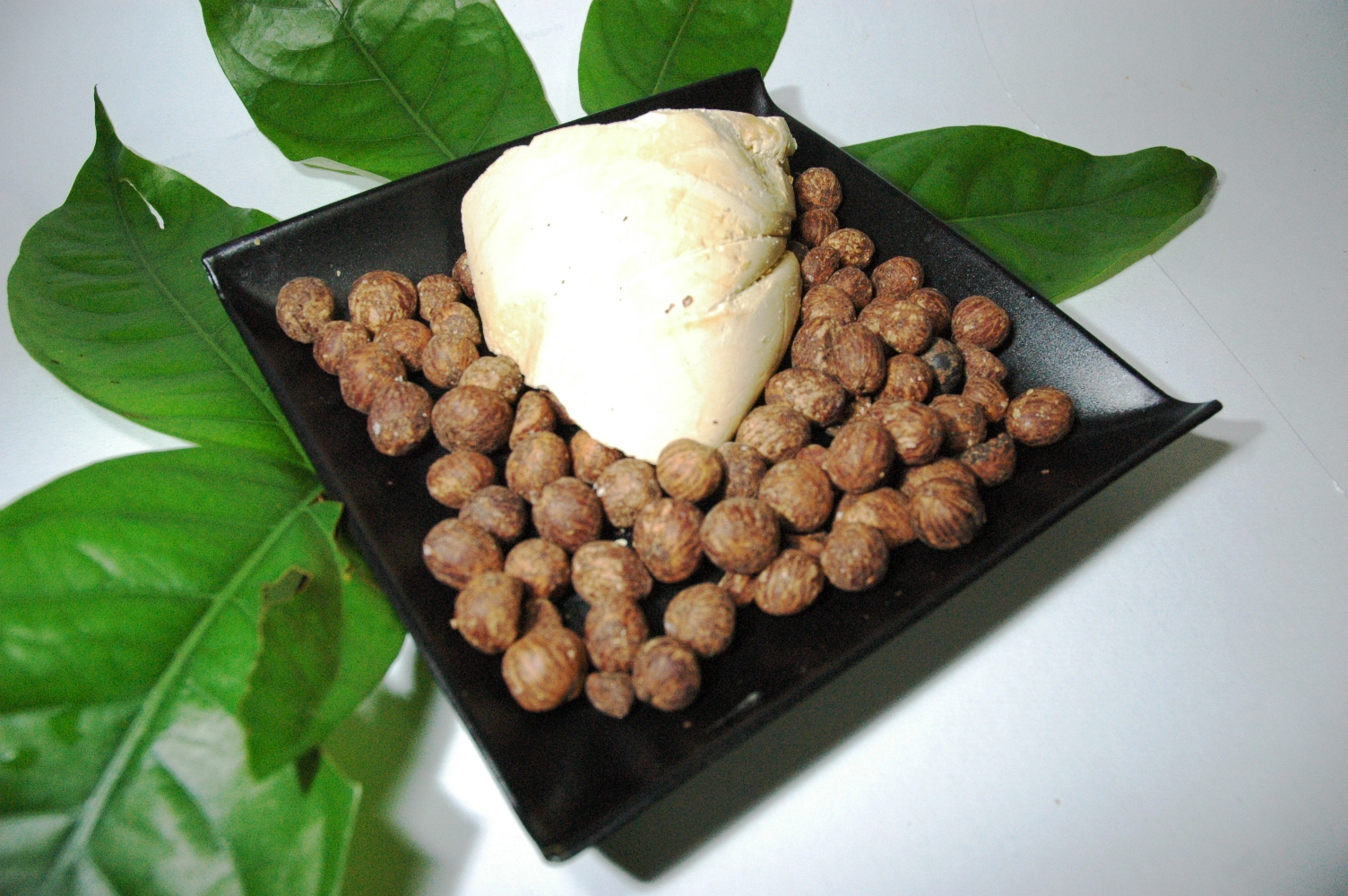
Ucuhuba butter

Lauric acid	% Weight	16.0 – 20.0
Myristic acid	% Weight	72.0 – 76.0
Palmitic acid	% Weight	7.0 – 9.0
Saturated	%	100
Unsaturated	%	0
