= Vieira Grande Bay =

Bay off the coast of Pará, Brazil

- Location within Brazil
- Location: Pará, Brazil
- Coordinates: 0°15′S 50°42′W
- River sources: Jacaré Grande; Amazon river channels
- Ocean/sea sources: Atlantic Ocean
- Basin countries: Brazil

Vieira Grande Bay (Portuguese: Baía do Vieira Grande) is a bay off the Brazilian coast located in the state of Pará. The bay forms one of the main river channels in the Amazon Delta.

The bay is fed in the South by the Jacaré Grande River and by a complex system of numerous river channels that are called furos in Portuguese. These channels form a link between the Amazon and the Vieira Grande Bay. The influence of the Amazon waters can be shown for example through the occurrence of the phytoplankton Thalassionema nitzschioides in the bay.

Further downstream, the bay is lined on the Western side by a string of islands, of which Serraria is the largest. These islands separate the bay from the main channel of the Amazon.

In the East, the bay is bordered by the North-Western coast of the island Marajó, where it touches the municipalities of Chaves and Afuá. The town of Afuá is built on stilts because high waters in the Bay cause the rivers surrounding it to rise. Part of this coastline is included in the Charapucu State Park. The Cajari River enters into the bay here.

Finally in the North, the Amazon has split up into several large river channels. The bay meets up with its South Channel (Canal Sul) off the coast of the island Caviana. At this point, there is a sandbank called Camaleão that is exposed during low tide. It links together some smaller islets, such as Ilha das Pacas, Camaleão, Camaleãozinho and Jacuraru.

The area covered by the bay used to be a swampy lake, which is now gradually filling up with water, causing the bay to widen over time. The bay is now deeper than the main channel of the Amazon. The Aruã people used to live on its banks. On the coast near Chaves, ceramic fragments could be found that relate to them, but the advance of the bay washed them away.

The bay is contained in the 59,985 square kilometres (23,160 sq mi) Marajó Archipelago Environmental Protection Area, a sustainable-use conservation unit established in 1989 to protect the environment of the region.
