= Marajó Archipelago =

Brazilian islands in Amazon river delta

Coordinates: 00°59′50″S 50°12′20″W

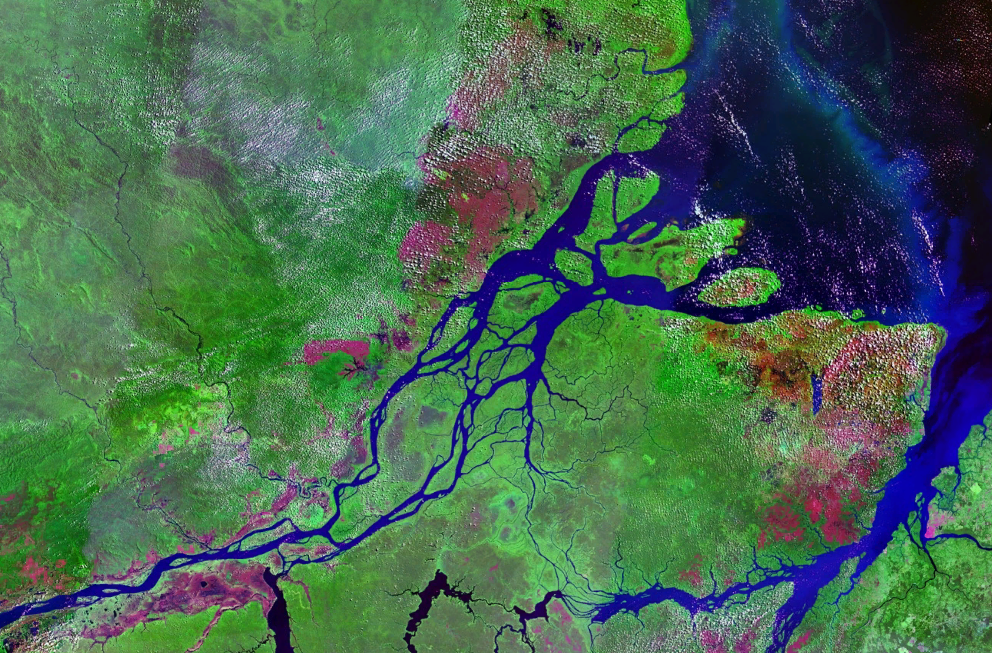
Satellite image of the mouths of the Amazon River in Brazil, with the Marajó Archipelago in the center (2006).

The Marajó Archipelago (Portuguese: arquipélago do Marajó) is the largest fluvial-maritime archipelago on Earth. Located in the Brazilian states of Amapá and Pará, the island group has approx. 2,500 islands.

The main island of the archipelago also has the name of Marajó; at about 42,000 km² in area, it is the largest coastal island in Brazil, extending from the mouth of the Amazon River, between the Line of the Equator and the parallel 1.55º south latitude and, in the E/W direction between the meridians 47º and 53º west longitude, until the Atlantic Ocean.

The aquatic and forming limits of the archipelago are: the Atlantic Ocean (north); Marajó Bay (east); the Pará River estuary complex (south), and; the Amazon Delta (west).

== Most important islands ==
The largest and most important islands include:

- Marajó Island: the largest and most populated island in the archipelago;
- Grande de Gurupá Island;
- Island of Franco;
- Island of Brique;
- Island of Flautino;
- Island of Curuá;
- Caviana Island;
- Mexiana Island;
- Januaçu Island;
- Jurupari Island;
- Santana Island;
- Siriri Island;
- Rasa Island;
- Pracuubinhas Island;
- Maruim Island;
- Prapion Island;
- Cará Island;
- Queimada Island;
- Pará Island;
- Morcego Island;
- Panema Island;
- Conceição Norte Island;
- Porcos Island;
- Vieira Island;
- São Salvador Island;
- Maracujá Island;
- Salvador Island;
- Island of Mucuti;
- Island of the Guaribas;
- Island of Corre;
- Roberta Island;
- Buquiá Island;
- Urutaí Island;
- Aranaí Island;
- Mutunguara Island;
- Camarão Island;
- Miritiapina Island;
- Grande de Santa Maria Island;
- Aturiá Island;
- Samanajós Island;
- Carutá Island;
- Pracatí Island;
- Island of Melgaço;
- Island of Bagre;
- Island of Araras;
- Mujirum Island;
- Island of Taquari;
- Conceição Sul Island;
- Camaleão Island;
- Machadinho Island;
- Joroca Island;
- Saracura Island;
- Jupatituba Island;
- São Francisco da Jararaca Island;
- Grande do Pacajaí Island.

== See also ==
- Marajó Archipelago Environmental Protection Area.
