= Furo (river channel) =

River channel in the Brazilian Amazon

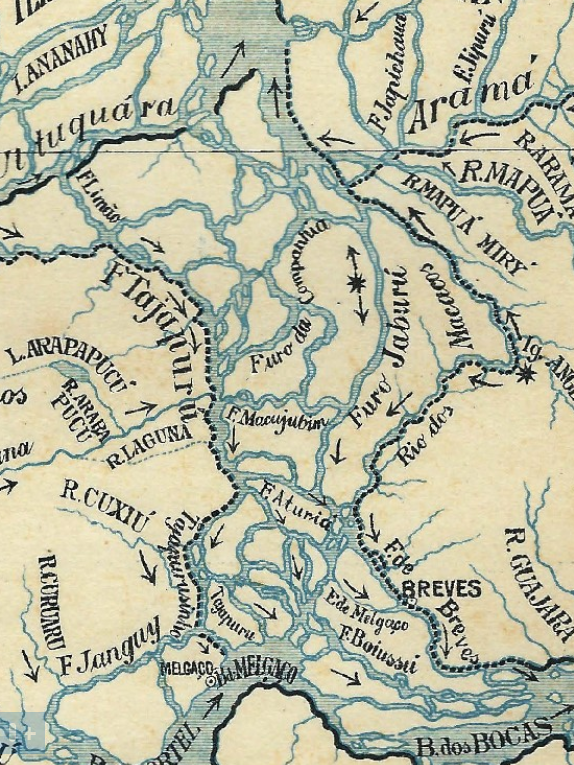
Furos de Breves, excerpt of a map by Jacques Huber (1902)

Furo is the hydrographic term for a type of river channel that is prevalent in the Brazilian Amazon basin, especially in the estuary where the currents of the Amazon River meet the tides of the Atlantic Ocean. They can be described as an anastomosing system, where the furos create a complex web of connections between each other and with larger rivers. A particularly intricate system called Furos de Breves can be found on the western side of Marajó, a large island in the Amazon Delta.

== Description ==
The Portuguese word furo translates as "drill hole". The origin of most furos is explained by the sediments that are deposited at the meeting of waters between the Amazon and the ocean. The dynamics of tides gave rise to the development of mangrove swamps that hold pools of standing water during low tide. These evolved into a system of islands and furo channels. Many furos have straight sections of up to 3 kilometres (1.9 mi) that resemble artificial canals. Their banks are flat and prone to flooding.

The direction of water flow in a furo depends on the tide: at low tide in the Atlantic Ocean the furo flows towards it, at high tide the ocean waters fill it up and cause the flow to change direction. The effect strengthens with the water levels in the Amazon, which strongly depend on the variation between dry and wet seasons. Because of this, many furos flood the surrounding lands at high tide during the rainy months between January and June.

The system is very dynamic, where the interplay between sedimentation and erosion causes islands and furo channels to shift. Pioneer species on newly formed islets are mainly aturiá and aninga. When their roots start to hold more sediments, mangroves and later palms like açaí and miriti appear. Islands only grow in one direction, depending on the river current. This has the effect of making the furo narrower.

== Furos de Breves ==
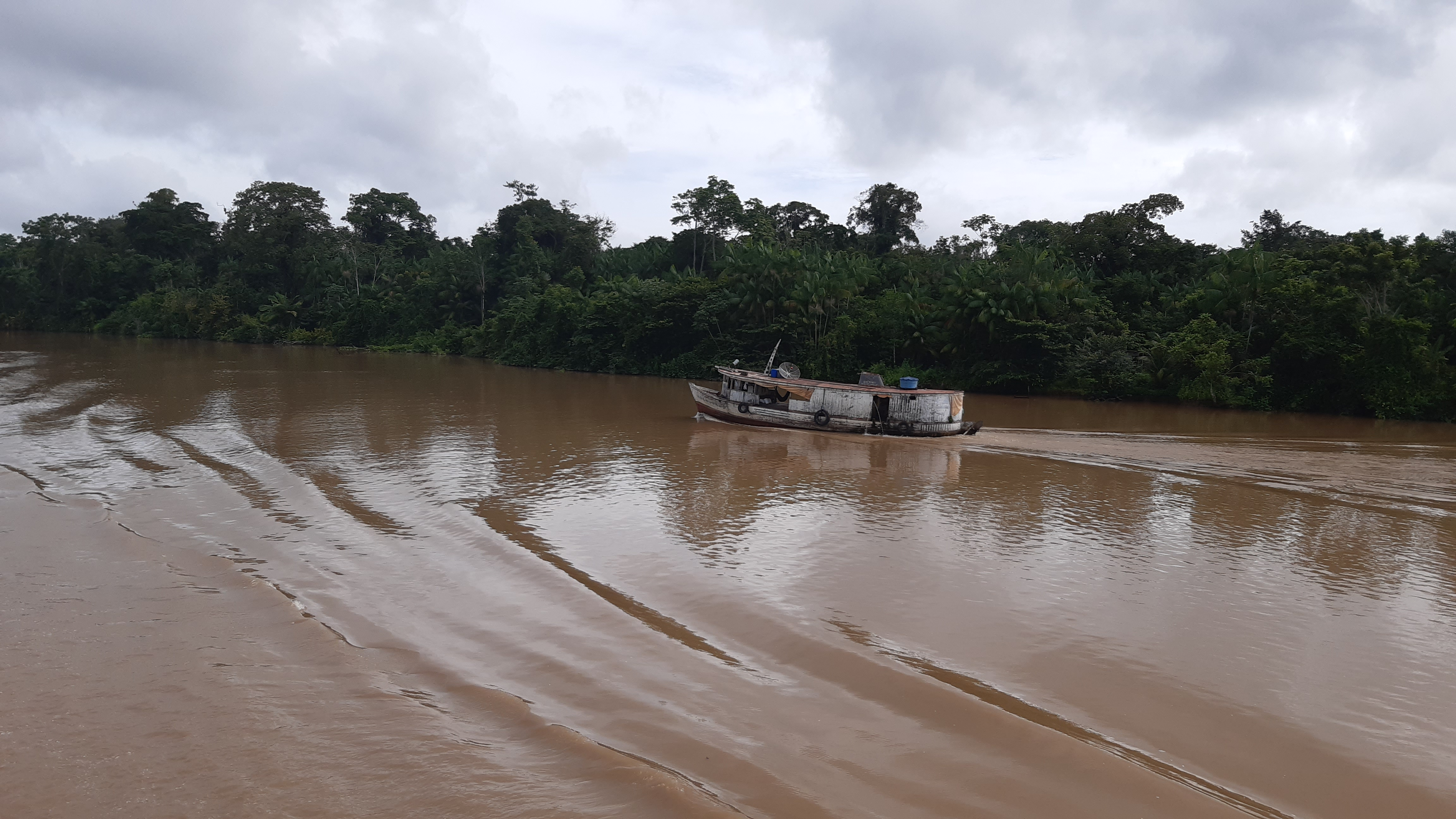
A boat on the Furo Santa Maria near Breves

Furos de Breves, named after the town of Breves, is the name of a labyrinthine system that connects the Amazon with the Pará River and the Vieira Grande Bay. In the area where the main mode of transportation is over water, they provide important shortcuts, shortening long boat journeys. Due to the geological dynamism of the region, where currents shift and streams can fill up with perilous floating branches, shippers prefer not to rely on modern navigation instruments, but on their handed-down knowledge of the river systems instead.
