= Marajó Archipelago Environmental Protection Area =

Environmental protection area in Pará, Brazil

- Área de Proteção Ambiental Arquipélago do Marajó
- IUCN category VI (protected area with sustainable use of natural resources)
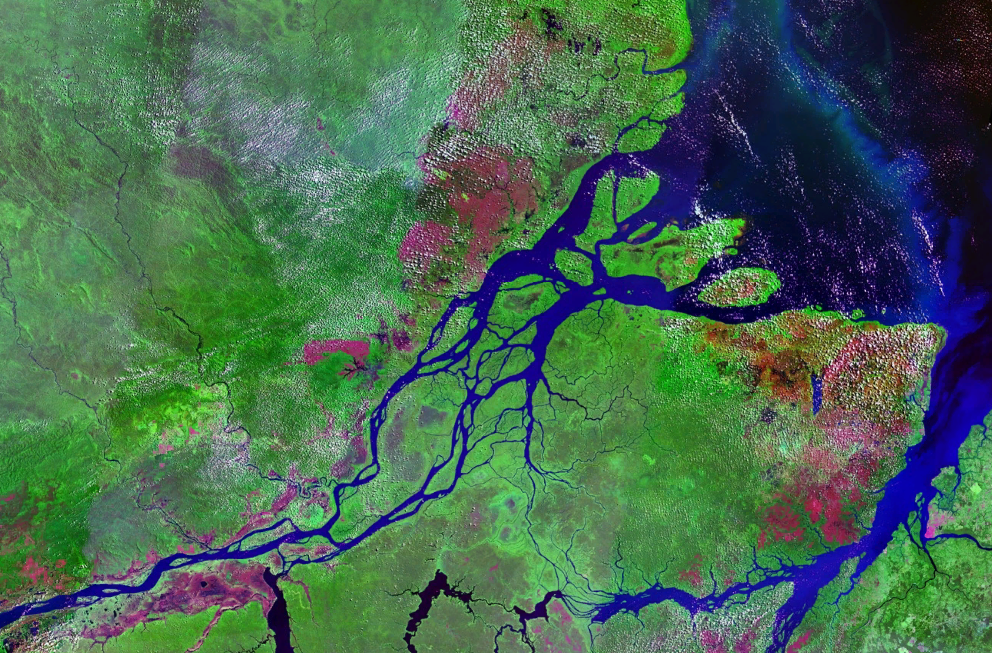
- Satellite view

- Location within Brazil
- Nearest city: Belém, Pará
- Coordinates: 0°49′09″S 49°47′11″W
- Area: 5,998,570 hectares (14,822,800 acres)
- Designation: Environmental protection area
- Created: 5 October 1989

The Marajó Archipelago Environmental Protection Area (Portuguese: Área de Proteção Ambiental Arquipélago do Marajó) is an environmental protection area in the state of Pará, Brazil. It protects the Marajó Archipelago, made up of marine fluvial islands in the area where the Amazon and Tocantins rivers converge and flow into the Atlantic, and covers almost 60,000 square kilometres (23,000 sq mi).

The area is inhabited, but human activities are limited to some extent to reduce ecological damage.

== Location ==
The Marajó Archipelago Environmental Protection Area (APA) is divided between the Pará municipalities of Afuá (14.2%), Anajás (11.78%), Breves (16.15%), Cachoeira do Arari (5.21%), Chaves (22.44%), Curralinho (6.09%), Muaná (6.37%), Ponta de Pedras (5.7%), Salvaterra (1.75%), Santa Cruz do Arari (1.69%), Soure (5.94%) and São Sebastião da Boa Vista (2.67%). It has an area of 5,998,570 hectares (14,822,800 acres).

The APA includes the island of Marajó and about 3,000 other islands and islets to the northwest of Belém in the delta region where the Amazon and Tocantins rivers empty into the Atlantic Ocean. The archipelago has a population of about of 250,000. The APA contains the Charapucu State Park in Afuá and the Mapuá, Terra Grande-Pracuúba and Soure extractive reserves.

== Environment ==
The Marajó Archipelago Environmental Protection Area covers a fluvial marine complex. It has a hot and humid climate with average temperatures of about 30 °C (86 °F). It contains lakes, rivers, creeks, grasslands, forests, farms and beaches. There are seasonal fluctuations with salt water flooding at times and the sweet and muddy waters of the rivers flooding at other times.

Vegetation includes alluvial and lowland dense rainforest, savannah, field, and pioneer formations in floodplains, salt marshes, mangroves and sandbanks. The floodplains and low fields are flooded for 3–4 months in the rainy season. Typical Amazon plant species include Caryocar glabrum, Cuban cedar (Cedrela odorata), Couratari multiflora, Hymenaea courbaril, Manilkara huberi, Brazil nut (Bertholletia excelsa), baboonwood (Virola surinamensis), açaí palm (Euterpe oleracea) and buriti palm (Mauritia flexuosa).

There is great diversity of terrestrial and aquatic animals including two endangered species of manatee, the West Indian manatee (Trichechus manatus) and the Amazonian manatee (Trichechus inunguis). The islands have large numbers of buffalo. Buffalo were introduced when a ship carrying them from India to French Guiana was shipwrecked off Marajó island, and they found the environment of flooded fields and abundant vegetation ideal.

== History ==
The Marajó Archipelago Environmental Protection Area was created on 5 October 1989 under article 13 of the Pará state constitution. Objectives are to develop and implement ecological and economic zoning aimed at conserving biodiversity and improving the quality of life of the population. Other goals are to preserve endangered species and representative samples of ecosystems, and support scientific research, environmental education and ecotourism.

A presidential decree of 12 February 2007 created an inter-ministerial executive group to monitor the competing actions of federal agencies in the archipelago, and to create a sustainable development plan in collaboration with civil society and the state and municipal governments. This plan was published in September 2007. It covered land use planning, land tenure and environmental management; promotion of sustainable production activities; infrastructure for development; social inclusion and citizenship; and institutional relations and management model. As of 2014 there was still no management plan for the APA, although by law there should be a management plan for the conservation unit, its buffer zone and ecological corridors, including measures to promote their integration into the socio-economic life of the surrounding communities.

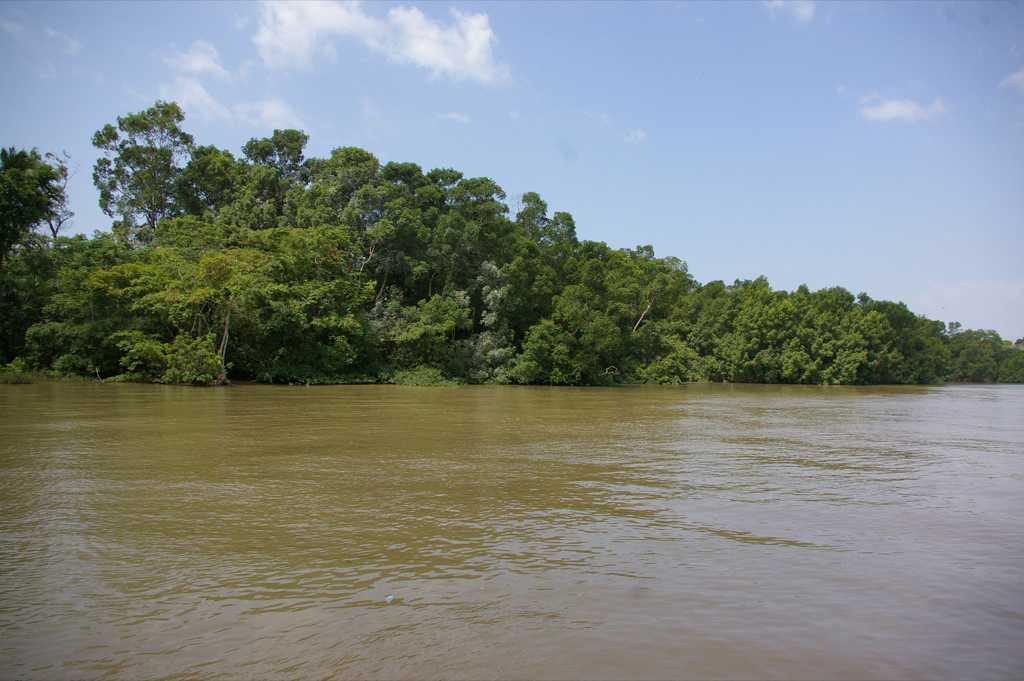
Marajo island

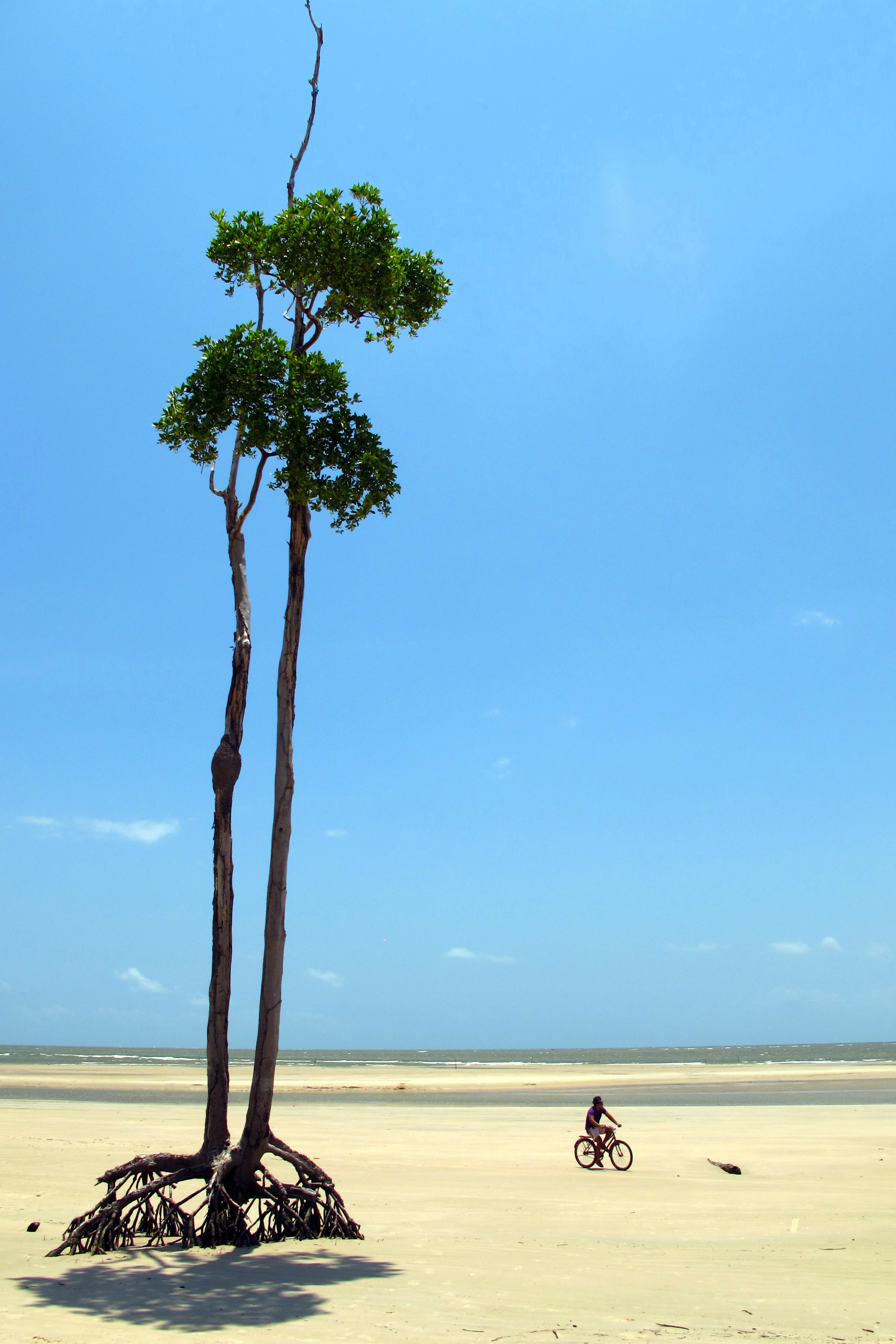
Soure beach

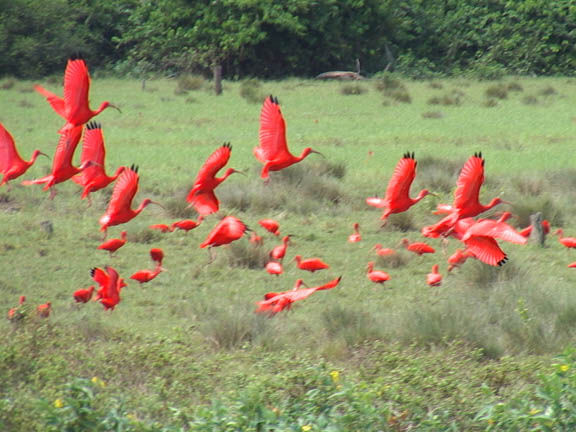
Scarlet Ibises

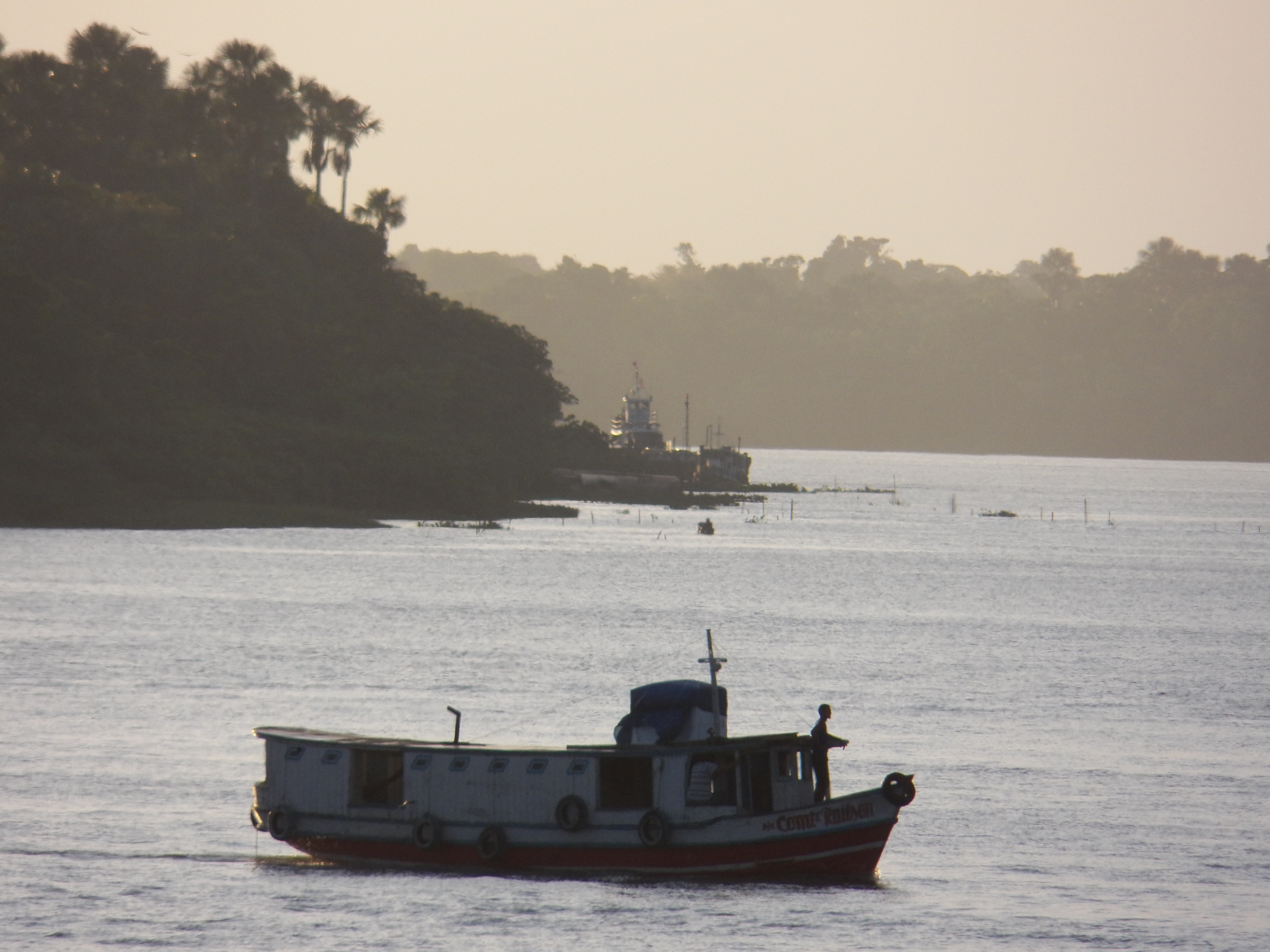
River traffic

== Sources ==
- APA Arquipélago do Marajó (in Portuguese), ISA: Instituto Socioambiental
- APA Marajó (in Portuguese), Ideflor-bio, archived from the original on 2018-07-19
- Plano de desenvolvimento territorial sustentável do arquipélago do Marajó (PDF) (in Portuguese), Grupo Executivo do Estado do Pará
- Plano de manejo da apa marajó está em fase de zoneamento ecológico (in Portuguese), Secretaria de Estado de Meio Ambiente e Sustentabilidade (Pará)
