= Jacques Huber =

Swiss-Brazilian botanist

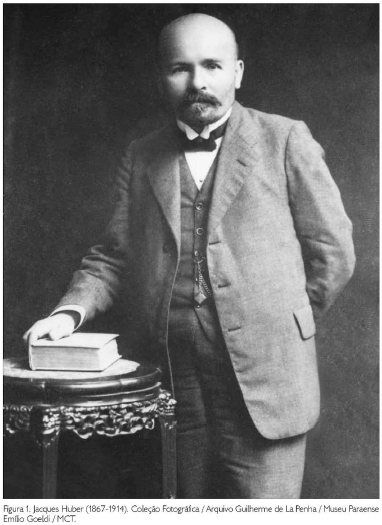
- Jacques Huber
- Born: 13 October 1867
- Died: 18 February 1914 (aged 66); Belém, Pará, Brazil
- Citizenship: Swiss and Brazilian
- Scientific career
- Fields: Botany
- Workplaces: Museu Paraense Emílio Goeldi
- Author abbrev. (botany): Huber

Notes
- Director of Museu Paraense Emílio Goeldi (1907-1914)

Jacques Huber (13 October 1867 Schleitheim – 18 February 1914 Belém) was a Swiss-Brazilian botanist who did pioneering work on the flora of the Amazon from 1895 until his death. He created and organized the herbarium and arboretum in Belém, Brazil, and was director of the Museu Paraense Emílio Goeldi from 1907 until he died.

== Works ==
- Materiaes para a flora amazonica (Vol. 1)
- Materiaes para a flora amazonica (Vol.2)
- Materiaes para a flora amazonica (Vol.5)
- Materiaes para a flora amazonica (Vol.6)
- Materiaes para a flora amazonica (Vol.7)
