= Teso =

Teso or TESO may refer to:

== Places ==
- Têso, a Portuguese hamlet
- Teso District, Kenya, a defunct administrative district in the former Western Province of Kenya
- Teso District, Uganda, a district in Uganda now known as Teso sub-region
- Teso Kingdom, a traditional kingdom in Uganda

== Language ==
- Teso language, a Nilo-Saharan language
- Teso-Turkana languages, a cluster of Eastern Nilotic languages

== Others ==
- Teso people, an ethnic group in eastern Uganda and western Kenya
- Teso (archeological site), a mound associated with Indigenous peoples in Brazil
- Teso dos Bichos (archeological site), a teso on the Brazilian island Marajó
- Fruko y sus Tesos, a salsa group from Colombia
- Royal TESO, a private ferry company operating the only public boat service to and from the Dutch Wadden island of Texel
- TESO (Austrian hacker group), a hacker group
- Teso Dos Bichos, the eighteenth episode of the third season of the American television drama, The X-Files
- Tamil Eelam Supporters Organization (TESO)
- The Elder Scrolls Online, a massively multiplayer online role-playing game
- Western Institute of Technology and Higher Education (in Spanish: ITESO, Universidad Jesuita de Guadalajara (Instituto Tecnológico y de Estudios Superiores de Occidente), a Jesuit university in the Western Mexican state of Jalisco, located in the municipality of Tlaquepaque in the Guadalajara Metropolitan Area, Mexico
