= Teso Dos Bichos =

Teso Dos Bichos may refer to:

- Teso dos Bichos (archeological site), an archeological site on the Brazilian island Marajó
- Teso Dos Bichos (The X-Files), an episode of the television series The X-Files
