= 2013 anti-Sri Lanka protests =

Student protests in India

- Part of protests against the Sri Lankan Civil War
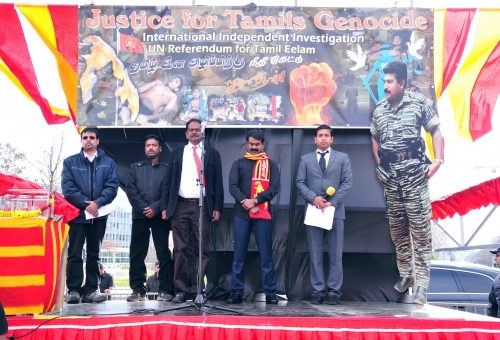
- Protests led by Tamil activists outside the United Nations Headquarters in Geneva, Switzerland
- Date: 11 March – October 2013
- Location: Tamil Nadu, India
- Caused by: Retaliation for war crimes committed against the Sri Lankan Tamil people during the Sri Lankan Civil War
- Goals: Pressure the Government of India to vote in support of a United Nations Human Rights Council (UNHRC) resolution condemning the Government of Sri Lanka for war crimes; Impose economic sanctions on Sri Lanka; Boycott the 2013 Commonwealth Heads of Government Meeting hosted by Sri Lanka; Prosecution of Sri Lankan President Mahinda Rajapaksa for war crimes; Formation of a separate Sri Lankan Tamil state, Tamil Eelam
- Methods: Hunger strikes, picketings, protest marches, sit-ins, self-immolation
- Result: Tamil Nadu Legislative Assembly passes the 2013 Tamil Nadu Assembly Resolution on Sri Lanka; Indian Prime Minister Manmohan Singh boycotts the 2013 Commonwealth Heads of Government Meeting

Parties
Tamil protesters and organizations: Students Federation for Freedom of Tamil Eelam; Tamil Eelam Supporters Organisation; Naam Tamilar Katchi; Tamil film actors; Tamil diaspora (abroad); Supported by: Tamil Nadu Legislative Assembly: All India Anna Dravida Munnetra Kazhagam; Dravida Munnetra Kazhagam	Sri Lanka; Government of India: Tamil Nadu Police

Casualties and losses
2 deaths; 500+ arrested	None

The 2013 anti-Sri Lanka protests were a series of student protests led by Tamil protesters and activists in Tamil Nadu, India in retaliation for war crimes committed against the Sri Lankan Tamil people by the Sri Lankan Army during the final stages of the Sri Lankan Civil War in 2009.

Protests were initiated by the Students Federation for Freedom of Tamil Eelam. Protesters demanded that the Government of India vote in support of a United Nations Human Rights Council (UNHRC) resolution censuring the Government of Sri Lanka for war crimes. More radical sects of the protests demanded the prosecution of Sri Lankan President Mahinda Rajapaksa for his role in the alleged genocide of Sri Lankan Tamils. Apart from college students, doctors, film personalities and employees of IT companies also participated in the protests.

== Protests ==
=== Tamil Nadu ===
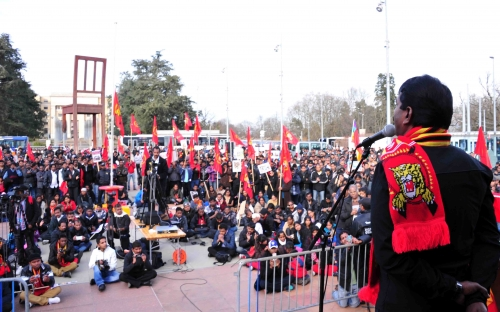
Tamil actor and politician Seeman addressing a Tamil diaspora gathering in March 2013

Protests began on 11 March 2013, when eight students of Loyola College, Chennai fasted in condemnation of alleged atrocities committed against Tamils in Sri Lanka. All 8 students were promptly arrested by the Tamil Nadu Police. The arrests were criticised by student organisations as well as the management of Loyola College and nine colleges across the city went on strike in response.

Following protests saw students from all over Tamil Nadu take to streets in a massive outrage against the predominantly-Sinhalese government of Sri Lanka. A large number of students participated in the protest, including students from other states whom were temporarily studying in Tamil Nadu.

A statewide general strike declared on 12 March by the Tamil Eelam Supporters Organisation (TESO) evoked a mixed response, with most political parties in the state remaining aloof and alleging inaction on the part of the main participant, the Dravida Munnetra Kazhagam (DMK).

On 16 March, a Sri Lankan Buddhist monk was attacked at the Brihadeeswara Temple in Thanjavur. Another monk was attacked the following day, at Chennai Central.

Student organisations called for statewide agitations on 18 March. Large-scale agitations were held outside Raj Bhavan, Chennai resulting in the arrest of over 500 students. The Government of Tamil Nadu declared the indefinite closure of 525 engineering colleges affiliated to Anna University, and several other arts and science colleges in the state were forced to close down for an indefinite period. As colleges remained closed, student groups organised protests using social media.

On 2 April 2013, several Tamil film actors staged a one-day fast in support of the protests.

=== International ===
On 20 June 2013, during the 2013 ICC Champions Trophy semi-final match between India and Sri Lanka at the SWALEC Stadium in Cardiff, Wales, several Tamil Eelam supporters invaded the pitch with Tamil Eelam flags. After the match, at least 400 protesters held up the bus for the Sri Lankan team and shouted anti-Sri Lankan government slogans at the cricketers.

== Aftermath ==
The Tamil Nadu Legislative Assembly passed legislation on 27 March 2013 urging the Indian Government to impose economic sanctions on Sri Lanka and demand for the formation of a separate Tamil state for the Sri Lankan Tamils. The resolution also called on the Indian Government to stop considering Sri Lanka as a "friendly country" and called for an international inquiry in "genocide and war crimes" against Sri Lankan Tamils.

The resolution called for the formation of a separate Tamil state in Sri Lanka, through the means of a referendum by a resolution at the UN Security Council which should be conducted among Tamils in Sri Lanka and other displaced Tamils across the world.

The resolution which was proposed by Tamil Nadu Chief Minister J. Jayalalithaa was unanimously passed by the Assembly. The resolution was passed following the debate in the Council regarding the then-ongoing protests. Moving the resolution, Jayalalithaa said the ongoing students protest was reflective of her government's initiative on the Sri Lankan issue even as she requested protestors to withdraw the stir and resume classes.

The Assembly passed another resolution in October 2013, demanding that the Indian government boycott the 2013 Commonwealth Heads of Government Meeting which was slated to be hosted by Sri Lanka and also sought the temporary suspension of Sri Lanka from the Commonwealth of Nations until Sri Lanka takes steps to grant what they call similar rights to Tamils as those enjoyed by Sinhalese. Indian Prime Minister Manmohan Singh announced his decision not to participate in the event due to pressure from regional Tamil parties regarding Sri Lanka's alleged human rights record. External Affairs Minister Salman Khurshid represented India at the summit in place of the prime minister.

The protests led to strained relations between the Dravida Munnetra Kazhagam (DMK), the main opposition party of Tamil Nadu, and the Indian National Congress (INC) the then-ruling party of India. On 19 March, DMK president M. Karunanidhi announced the party's withdrawal from the INC-led United Progressive Alliance, citing the INC's alleged disregard for the suffering of Sri Lankan Tamils as the DMK's reason for pulling out. The DMK's withdrawal was well received by DMK supporters. This left the INC isolated in Tamil Nadu in the 2014 general elections, contesting in 40 seats alone and losing in all constituencies. The DMK would eventually rejoin the UPA during the 2016 Tamil Nadu Legislative Assembly elections, but the alliance would once again lose to the ruling All India Anna Dravida Munnetra Kazhagam (AIADMK).

== See also ==
- Attacks on Sri Lankans in Tamil Nadu
