= Rebordelo =

Rebordelo may refer to the following places in Portugal:

- Rebordelo (Amarante), a parish in the municipality of Amarante
- Rebordelo (Vinhais), a parish in the municipality of Vinhais

== See also ==
- Rebordello, a historic and archaeological site on the island Caviana in Pará, Brazil
