= Teso Dos Bichos (The X-Files) =

- The X-Files episode
- Episode no.: Season 3 Episode 18
- Directed by: Kim Manners
- Written by: John Shiban
- Production code: 3X18
- Original air date: March 8, 1996
- Running time: 43 minutes

Guest appearances
- Vic Trevino as Lonnie Bilac; Janne Mortil as Mona Wustner; Gordon Tootoosis as Shaman; Tom McBeath as Dr. Lewton; Ron Sauve as Tim Decker; Alan Robertson as Carl Roosevelt; Garrison Chrisjohn as Dr. Winters

Episode chronology
← Previous "Pusher"	Next → "Hell Money"
- The X-Files season 3

"Teso Dos Bichos" is the eighteenth episode of the third season of the science fiction television series The X-Files. It premiered on the Fox network on March 8, 1996. It was written by John Shiban, and directed by Kim Manners. The episode is a "Monster-of-the-Week" story, unconnected to the series' wider mythology. "Teso Dos Bichos" earned a Nielsen household rating of 10.7, being watched by 17.38 million people in its initial broadcast. The episode received mostly negative reviews.

The show centers on FBI special agents Fox Mulder (David Duchovny) and Dana Scully (Gillian Anderson) who work on cases linked to the paranormal, called X-Files. In this episode, Mulder and Scully investigate a series of deaths that occur immediately after an ancient artifact is brought to Boston from an excavation site in South America. According to Scully, the deaths appear to be the result of political terrorism, but Mulder suspects something more improbable.

The production for "Teso Dos Bichos", which was strongly disliked by the cast and crew of The X-Files, was plagued by several issues. Director Kim Manners, who had particular disdain for the episode, later made T-shirts and gave them to the cast and crew that read "'Teso Dos Bichos' Survivor". The episode's title is a Brazilian Portuguese phrase that means "mound of small animals".

== Plot ==
At an archaeological dig in the Ecuadorian highlands, two archaeologists, Dr. Bilac and Dr. Roosevelt, get into an argument over the removal of a burial urn that contains the remains of an Amaru, or female shaman. Roosevelt argues the urn must be taken from the site and preserved in a museum, much to the chagrin of Bilac and the tribespeople present, who believe disturbing the Amaru will invoke a curse. Later, a native shaman distributes Yaje to the local villagers and Bilac. During this ritual, a jaguar spirit kills Roosevelt in his tent.

Later, in Boston, Fox Mulder and Dana Scully investigate the disappearance of Dr. Craig Horning, an archaeologist working at the local Museum of Natural History, after a security guard discovers a large amount of blood in Horning's lab. They interview both the curator, Dr. Lewton, and graduate student Mona Wustner. They also visit a reclusive Bilac. After closing, Lewton is killed by the jaguar spirit after his car fails to start. During an investigation of the crime scene, Scully comes across rat corpses in the engine compartment of Lewton's vehicle. Mona denies that anything unusual has happened in the museum, but when she visits Bilac later, she discovers he has been abusing Yaje and is approaching a psychotic state.

Mulder and a group of police search for Lewton's remains in some woods near the museum. Scully sees blood dripping on Mulder's face from above and, upon looking up, they see a portion of Lewton's intestine hanging from a tree. Scully, about to perform an autopsy on the intestine, is interrupted by a panicked Mona's phone call. Mona reports that Bilac has been consuming Yaje. Alone at the museum, she hears noises from a restroom and, upon opening a toilet lid, sees rats forcing their way out of the sewer. When the two agents arrive, they discover Bilac crying beside one of the toilets, saying that Mona is dead.

Mulder and Scully place Bilac in the custody of two local policemen, but he escapes from the room in which he is being held without exiting through the only door. Mulder notices a large drag mark through the dust on the floor, discovering a hatch leading to the museum's old steam tunnels. While exploring the tunnels, the agents find the remains of the victims and are attacked by hundreds of feral cats. Discovering the hatch through which Bilac was dragged, they pull out his mutilitated body and escape, closing the hatch on the pursuing cats. A short while later, animal control informs Mulder and Scully that they discovered no signs of cats in the steam tunnels.

The episode closes with Mulder musing in his journal. He writes that he suspects the animal attacks were associated with the burial urn that had been removed against the wishes of the Ecuadorian tribespeople. As the urn is returned to the burial grounds, the local shaman watches the urn's reburial with jaguar-like eyes.

== Production ==
"Teso Dos Bichos" was written by John Shiban. The episode's title, which is a Brazilian Portuguese phrase meaning "mound of small animals", shares its name with an archaeological site of the same name on the island of Marajó in Brazil. Incidentally, in some Hispanophone regions of the world, the word bichos is a euphemism for male genitalia; Shiban was unaware of this usage, and he later joked that any possible "controversy" would be "good for ratings".

The production of the episode was plagued with issues. At the last minute the ending of the episode had to be rewritten; originally, the episode was to feature "hordes" of common house cats attacking Mulder and Scully, but the cats refused to attack under direction, doing "pretty much nothing". To further complicate matters, Gillian Anderson had a severe cat allergy, and so the whole sequence was nixed. While director Kim Manners felt that the episode's first three acts were "the best three acts of television [he had] ever directed", he believed that the fourth act was "an absolute disaster." Manners reportedly asked series creator Chris Carter to film a leopard for the fourth act rather than house cats, saying "I begged Carter 'Please let's revisit the leopard in the teaser because I'm never going to make these cats scary'".

"Teso Dos Bichos" was strongly disliked by the cast and crew of The X-Files, including both David Duchovny and Kim Manners. Manners found the story uninteresting because "pussycats are not scary". He later made T-shirts and gave them to the cast and crew that read "Teso Dos Bichos Survivor". Manners bestowed two nicknames upon the episode. The first, "Second Salmon", referred to the number of re-writes the episode went through. Every time an episode was re-written, the color of the script changed accordingly. "Teso Dos Bichos" went through so many re-writes that the cast eventually received a second round of salmon colored copies. The second nickname, again, courtesy of Manners, was "Teso Dos Bitches."

== Broadcast and reception ==
"Teso Dos Bichos" premiered on the Fox network on March 8, 1996. This episode earned a Nielsen rating of 10.7, with an 18 share, meaning that roughly 10.7 percent of all television-equipped households, and 18 percent of households watching television, were tuned in to the episode. It was viewed by 17.38 million viewers.

The episode received negative reviews from critics. A writer from Entertainment Weekly gave "Teso Dos Bichos" a C, and sardonically wrote, "No es bueno!" Reviewer Zack Handlen of The A.V. Club gave the episode a C− and criticized the laziness of the writing, saying, "Maybe I'm missing something here. There could be some subtext in, um, yeah, I got nothing. The dead rats in the toilet were freaky, right? And they did kill that dog off, so that's hardcore. Really, though, I'm just too disappointed to say much else. This is paint-by-numbers at its most tedious, and while it's nice to have evident proof of how far the show has come since it started, that doesn't make it any easier to sit through."

Cyriaque Lamar from i09 called the Jaguar Spirit one of "The 10 Most Ridiculous X-Files Monsters" and wrote, "In this fairly ridiculous Season 3 episode, an Ecuadorian artifact possessed by a Jaguar Spirit (or something) causes tabbies to go bonkers and murder people. This scene of Scully fighting a cat deserves the GIF treatment. Make it happen, folks!" Robert Shearman, in his book Wanting to Believe: A Critical Guide to The X-Files, Millennium & The Lone Gunmen, rated the episode one star out of five, calling the premise "achingly unambitious". The author roundly criticized the plot, calling it a "retread of a cursed mummy movie without a mummy", as well as the performances of Trevino, Duchovny, and Anderson. Despite the overall negativity, Shearman noted that the "much derided" cat sequence was not "that badly handled."

== Bibliography ==
- Hatfield, James H.; Burt, George (1997). The Unauthorized X-cyclopedia: The Definitive Reference Guide to The X-files. Kensington Books. ISBN 9781575662336.
- Hurwitz, Matt; Knowles, Chris (2008). The Complete X-Files. Insight Editions. ISBN 978-1-933784-80-9.
- Lowry, Brian (1996). Trust No One: The Official Guide to the X-Files. Harper Prism. ISBN 0061053538.
- Roosevelt, Anna Curienius (1991). Moundbuilders of the Amazon: Geophysical Archaeology on Marajo Island, Brazil. Academic Press. ISBN 9780125953481.
- Shearman, Robert (2009). Wanting to Believe: A Critical Guide to The X-Files, Millennium & The Lone Gunmen. Mad Norwegian Press. ISBN 978-0-9759446-9-1.
