= Thooku Medai =

- Theatrical release poster
- Directed by: Amirtham
- Written by: M. Karunanidhi
- Based on: Thooku Medai by M. Karunanidhi
- Starring: Chandrasekhar; Menaka
- Music by: Shankar–Ganesh
- Production company: Sri Appan Films
- Release date: 28 May 1982
- Country: India
- Language: Tamil

Thooku Medai (transl. Gallows) is a 1982 Indian Tamil-language political drama film directed by Amirtham and written by M. Karunanidhi. The film stars Chandrasekhar and Menaka. It is an adaptation of Karunanidhi's play of the same name. The film was released on 28 May 1982.

== Cast ==
- Chandrasekhar
- Chakravarthy
- Menaka
- Usha Rajender
- Nagesh

== Production ==
Thooku Medai is a film adaptation of the stage play of the same name written by M. Karunanidhi who scripted the film version too.

== Soundtrack ==
The music was composed by Shankar–Ganesh.

Track listing
No.	Title	Lyrics	Singer(s)	Length
1.	"Kodi Uyara Kol Uyarum"	M. Karunanidhi	Malaysia Vasudevan	4:48
2.	"Aayiram Piraigal Kaanumvarai"	M. Karunanidhi	Vani Jairam	4:14
3.	"Kurinji Malar Ondru"	M. Karunanidhi	P. Jayachandran, Vani Jairam	4:49
4.	"Inioru Thollaiyum Illai"	Subramania Bharati	T. M. Soundararajan	3:33
Total length:				17:24

== Controversy ==
Karunanidhi was displeased with the censor board for reducing 500 feet of the film which contained his dialogues that focused "on the long search from Madurai to Tiruchendur".

== Release and reception ==
Thooku Medai was released on 28 May 1982. The reviewer from Kalki lauded Chandrasekhar's performance, and his recital of Karunanidhi's dialogues. Despite this, it failed commercially.
