= Students Federation for Freedom of Tamil Eelam =

Students Federation for Freedom of Tamil Eelam is the student federation in Tamil Nadu in India which initiated 2013 Anti-Sri Lanka protests in Tamil Nadu. Its objective is to create free Tamil Eelam.

It demanded India to boycott 2013 CHOGM summit in Sri Lanka. It protested against the BJP's invitation to Sri Lankan President Mahinda Rajapaksa in the swearing-in ceremony of Narendra Modi.
