= Rebordello =

Former town in Pará, Brazil

- Aldeia de Piyé
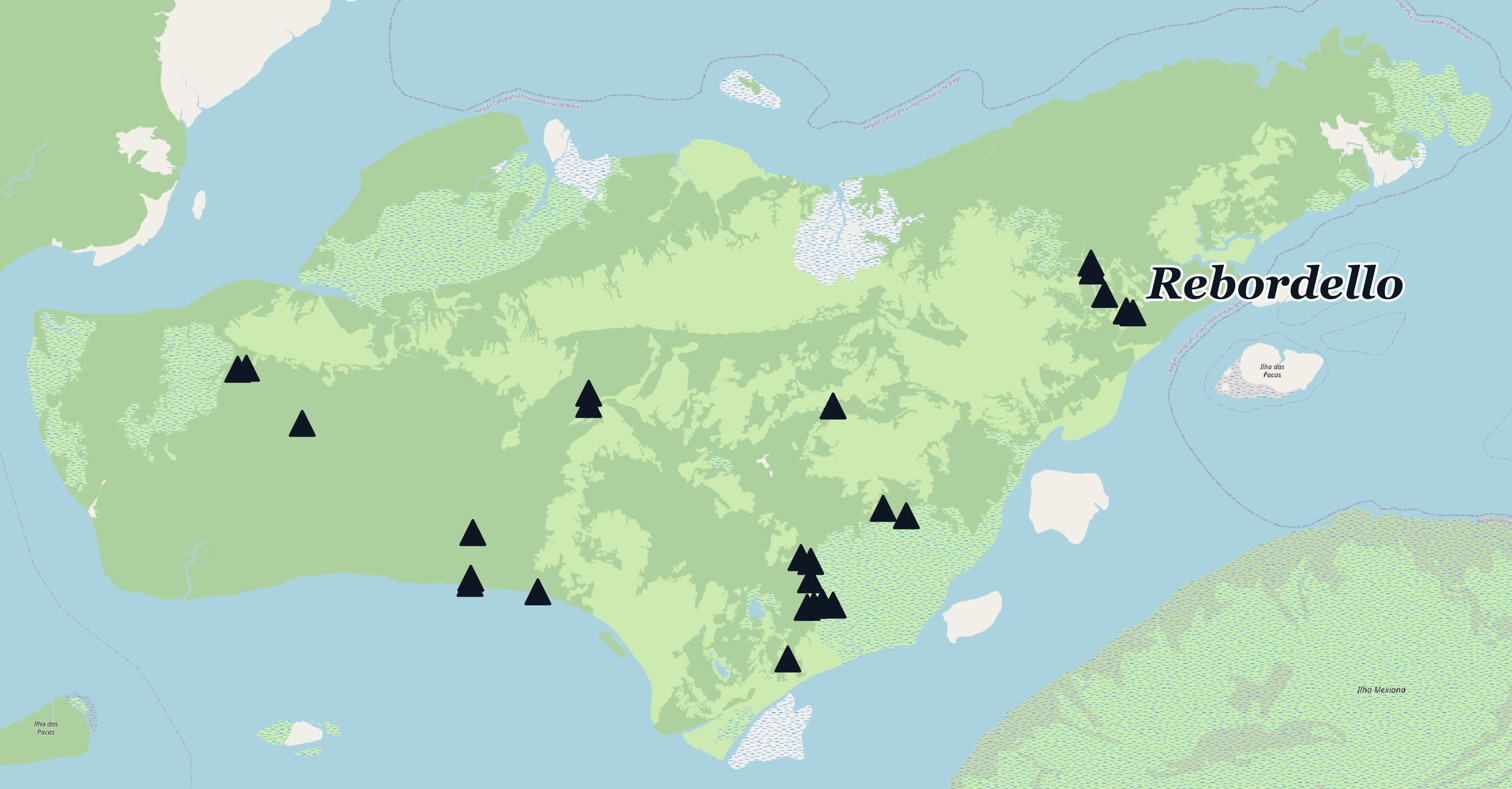
- Map of Outer Caviana showing the location of archeological sites (tesos). The location of Rebordello has been labelled.

- Location within Brazil
- 0°12′18″N 49°43′31″W
- Cultures: Aruã people
- Location: Caviana Island, Pará, Brazil

History
- Abandoned: 1834–1836

Rebordello (also spelled Rebordelo) is a former town and a historic and archaeological site on Caviana, an island located in the Amazon Delta in the Brazilian state Pará.

== Location ==
Rebordello is located in the tidally flooded Marajó várzea forests on the south-eastern coast of Caviana, at the edge of the Amazon Delta where the waters of the Amazon River enter the Atlantic Ocean. It is on the shore of a channel of the Amazon called the Canal Perigoso ("Dangerous Channel"), which separates Caviana from neighbouring island Mexiana. The channel is called such because sandbanks and strong winds make navigation perilous during low tides. Opposite Rebordello is a smaller island called Ilha das Pacas.

== History ==
In the seventeenth and eighteenth century, Caviana was the stronghold of the indigenous Aruã people. They called the island Uyruma in the Aruã language. In the mid seventeenth century, their chief was Piyé. Their main settlement on the eastern coast was called Piyé's Village (Portuguese: Aldeia de Piyé). Piyé became mostly known for refusing to swear an oath of obedience to the Kingdom of Portugal during the Treaty of the Mapuá.

Between 1725 and 1728, the Aruã on Caviana repeatedly needed to defend themselves from attacks by the French together with an indigenous group from neighbouring island Mexiana under their leader Gaaimara. In 1760, the village was renamed Rebordello by the Portuguese missionary Antônio de Santo Agostinho. It had a mission post of the Order of Saint Anthony. In 1763 the village suffered a fire.

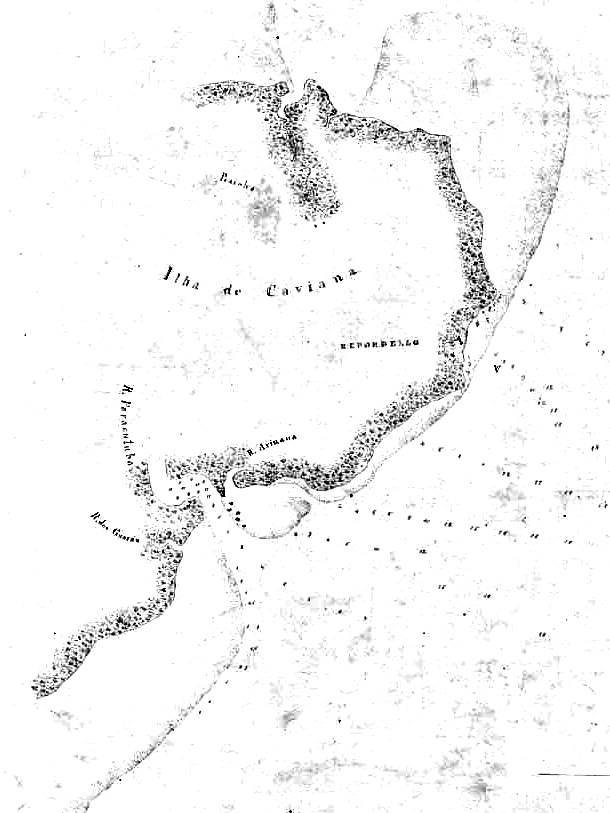
Map from 1854 of the port of Rebordello (then already abandoned)

Aldeia de Piyé had been a great centre of Aruã culture, but after decades of harassment by the French and the Portuguese, most of them migrated. They first settled on Marajó, mainly in the basin of the Ganhoão River. Later, many moved to what is now Amapá and French Guiana. In 1816, there were still 279 Aruã living in Rebordello. Many left the area after the Revolt of the Cabanos between 1834 and 1836. When Curt Nimuendajú visited the area around 1920, he counted three houses and a wooden chapel. In 2006, only parts of wooden fundaments and the ruins of a church could be found.
