= Thenpandi Singam =

Thenpandi Singam is a Tamil historical novel written by Kalaignar M. Karunanidhi, who based his novel on a legendary story of Valukku Veli Ambalam, a Petty chief ruling Paganeri Nadu, one of the Kallar Nadus in the 18th century. Malayalam poet S Ramesan Nair translated Thenpandisingam to Malayalam.

Kalaignar was also awarded the "Raja Rajan Award" by Tamil University, Thanjavur for this book.

== Plot summary ==
Thenpandi Singam is a historical fiction, which has mostly real historical characters.

The story starts with a brief description by Kalaignar M. Karunanidhi Tamil Nadu.

The list of different Nadus mentioned are:

Mela Nadu, Sirugudi Nadu, Mallakkotai Nadu, Pattamangala Nadu, Paganeri Nadu, Kandar Manicham Nadu, Kunnankkottai Nadu, Thennilai Nadu, Iravuseri Nadu, Unjanai Nadu, Semponmari Nadu, Kappalur Nadu, Silamba Nadu, Irumba Nadu, Therpogi Nadu, Vadapogi Nadu, Gopala Nadu, Arrangarai Nadu, Ellu Kottai Nadu, Muthu Nadu, Etc..

Kallaingar's sources were stone inscriptions and Kallar Saritiram by Navalar N.M Venkatasamy Nattar.

The story revolves around a war between Valukku Veli, a very strong Ambalakkarar who ruled Paganeri Nadu in present-day Ramanathapuram District, who opposed British rule, and Vallathuarayan an Ambalakkarar who ruled Pattamangala Nadu. Besides these, there are other main characters, such as:

- Karutta Adappan
- Vairamuttan
- Urangappuli Thevan
- Kalyani Nachiyar
- Sundarambal
- Vadivambal
- Vellai Iyer
- Meganadan

Kalaignar also provided a lot of the information about the bravery of Tamil people, for instance, Dheeran Chinnamalai, Maruthu Pandiyar, Veerapandiya Kattabomman and how they opposed the British rule.

== Thenpandi Singam (TV serial) ==
This TV serial was written by Kalaignar Karunanidhi, Music composed by Ilaiyaraaja and was telecast in Doordarshan during 1996. Starring Nassar and Geetha in the lead roles.
