= M. Karunanidhi =

Indian writer and politician (1924–2018)

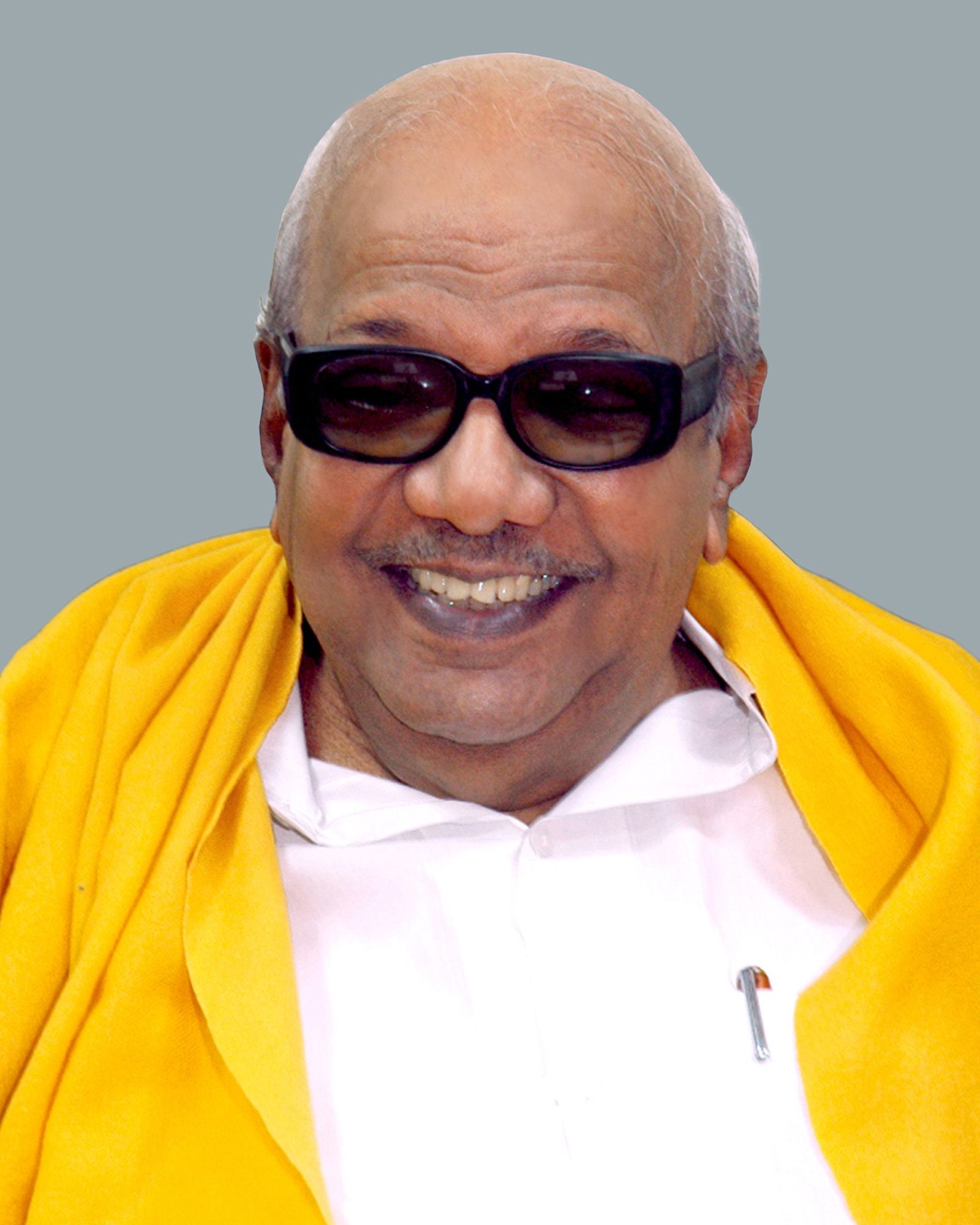
- Official portrait, 2005

2nd Chief Minister of Tamil Nadu
- In office 13 May 2006 – 15 May 2011
- Governor: Surjit Singh Barnala
- Deputy: M. K. Stalin (from May 2009)
- Preceded by: J. Jayalalithaa
- Succeeded by: J. Jayalalithaa
- Constituency: Chepauk
- In office 13 May 1996 – 13 May 2001
- Governor: Marri Chenna Reddy (1996); Krishan Kant (Addition Charge) (1996–1997); M. Fathima Beevi (from 1997)
- Preceded by: J. Jayalalithaa
- Succeeded by: J. Jayalalithaa
- Constituency: Chepauk
- In office 27 January 1989 – 30 January 1991
- Governor: P. C. Alexander (until 1990); Surjit Singh Barnala (from 1990)
- Preceded by: President's rule V. N. Janaki
- Succeeded by: President's rule J. Jayalalithaa
- Constituency: Chennai Harbour
- In office 10 February 1969 – 31 January 1976
- Governor: Ujjal Singh (until 1971); Kodardas Kalidas Shah (from 1971)
- Preceded by: C. N. Annadurai; V. R. Nedunchezhiyan (interim) (Note: V. R. Nedunchezhiyan served acting chief minister for 8 days.)
- Succeeded by: President's rule
- Constituency: Saidapet
Legislative offices
Leader of the Opposition in Tamil Nadu Legislative Assembly
In office 25 July 1977 – 18 August 1983
Chief Minister	M. G. Ramachandran
Preceded by	P. G. Karuthiruman
Succeeded by	K. S. G. Haja Shareef
Constituency	Anna Nagar

Member of Tamil Nadu Legislative Assembly
- In office 22 May 2011 – 7 August 2018
- Preceded by: U. Mathivanan
- Succeeded by: K. Poondi Kalaivanan
- Constituency: Thiruvarur
- In office 22 May 1996 – 21 May 2011
- Preceded by: Zeenath Shreiffdeen
- Succeeded by: constituency abolished
- Constituency: Chepauk
- In office 27 January 1989 – 1 July 1991
- Preceded by: A. Selvarajan
- Succeeded by: Selvarasam
- Constituency: Harbour
- In office 30 June 1977 – 18 August 1983
- Preceded by: constituency established
- Succeeded by: So. Ma. Ramachandran
- Constituency: Anna Nagar
- In office 25 February 1967 – 31 January 1976
- Preceded by: Munu Adhi
- Succeeded by: D. Purushothaman
- Constituency: Saidapet
- In office 24 February 1962 – 25 February 1967
- Preceded by: A. Y. S. Parisutha Nadar
- Succeeded by: A. Y. S. Parisutha Nadar
- Constituency: Thanjavur
- In office 1 April 1957 – 24 February 1962
- Preceded by: constituency established
- Succeeded by: V. Ramanathan
- Constituency: Kulithalai

Member of the Tamil Nadu Legislative Council
- In office 30 March 1984 – 1 November 1986
- Leader of the House: R. M. Veerappan
- Preceded by: K. A. Krishnasway
- Succeeded by: position abolished
- Constituency: Elected by MLAs

1st President of Dravida Munnetra Kazhagam
- In office 27 July 1969 – 7 August 2018
- General Secretary: V. R. Nedunchezhiyan (till 1977); K. Anbazhagan (from 1977)
- Preceded by: position established
- Succeeded by: M. K. Stalin

Personal details
- Born: Muthuvel Karunanidhi; 3 June 1924 Thirukuvalai, Madras Presidency, British Raj
- Died: 7 August 2018 (aged 94) Chennai, Tamil Nadu, India
- Resting place: Kalaignar Karunanidhi Ninaividam
- Party: Dravida Munnetra Kazhagam
- Other political affiliations: Justice Party, Dravidar Kazhagam (before 1949)
- Spouse: Padmavathi Ammal (m. 1944; died 1948) Dayalu Ammal (m. 1948) Rajathi Ammal (m. 1966)
- Children: 6, including Muthu, Alagiri, Stalin and Kanimozhi
- Relatives: Karunanidhi family
- Awards: Honorary Doctorate (1971)
- Website: kalaignar.dmk.in
- Nickname(s): Kalaignar, Mutthamizh Arignar
- En uyirinum melana anbu udan pirappukkale ("My beloved siblings who are esteemed loftier than my life")

Muthuvel Karunanidhi (3 June 1924 – 7 August 2018), popularly known as Kalaignar was an Indian politician, writer and screenwriter who served as Chief Minister of Tamil Nadu for five terms between 1969 and 2011 and was the longest-serving chief minister in the state's history. He was the ten-time president of the Dravida Munnetra Kazhagam (DMK) for nearly five decades and a leading figure in the Dravidian movement. He was noted for his contributions to Tamil literature, which include plays, novels, poems, and a multi-volume memoir.

Born in Thirukkuvalai in 1924, Karunanidhi was politically active from adolescence, participating in the Anti-Hindi agitation of 1937–40 and founding the Dravidian movement's first student wing. He pursued a parallel career in the Tamil film industry as a screenwriter, composing the dialogue for landmark films including M. G. Ramachandran's debut as a lead, Rajakumari, and Sivaji Ganesan's debut, Parasakthi. He used his writing to propagate the rationalist and egalitarian ideals of Periyar and DMK founder C. N. Annadurai, and was himself an avowed atheist and rationalist.

Karunanidhi entered the Madras state legislature in 1957 and succeeded Annadurai as DMK president and Chief Minister following the latter's death in 1969. Over the following four decades, his political career was characterised by shifting alliances with national parties — the Indian National Congress, the Bharatiya Janata Party, and the United Front — and by sustained rivalry with the AIADMK, particularly its leader J. Jayalalithaa. His government was dismissed in 1991 over alleged links with the Liberation Tigers of Tamil Eelam, and he was controversially arrested in 2001 on Jayalalithaa's orders. He returned to power in 1996 and again in 2006, completing his final term in 2011.

As Chief Minister, Karunanidhi championed increased state autonomy, caste-based affirmative action, and subsidies for the poor, policies that were widely adopted elsewhere in India and cemented his support among lower-caste communities. He was instrumental in securing classical language status for Tamil and in commissioning the 133-foot Thiruvalluvar Statue at Kanyakumari. He was also frequently accused of nepotism and of lending political support to the LTTE. Karunanidhi died on 7 August 2018 at Kauvery Hospital in Chennai after prolonged age-related illnesses.

== Early life and family ==
Karunanidhi was born on 3 June 1924, in the village of Thirukkuvalai in Tanjore district (currently Nagapattinam district), Madras Presidency in the erstwhile British Raj, to Ayyadurai Muthuvel and Anjugam. He had two elder sisters, Periyanayaki and Shanmugasundari. While there was some misconception that his birth name was Dakshinamurthy, later changed to Karunanidhi under the influence of Dravidian and rationalist movements, Karunanidhi himself stated that C.N. Annadurai asked him to keep his birthname "Karunanidhi", since it was already popular among the people. In his own writings Karunanidhi said that his family were of the Isai Vellalar, a community who had traditionally played musical instruments at ceremonial occasions. Karunanidhi started his education at a local school. Karunanidhi's father was eager to teach him music. His music teachers were from the Isai Vellalar group, and the lessons were conducted in temples where he was not allowed to cover his upper body, wear slippers, or wear a cotton cloth around his hips as a sign of respect for the upper caste people. He couldn't tolerate learning in an environment where he wasn't treated with respect, which made his father agree to stop his music classes. His father also asked the local headmaster to set up special tutoring courses for Karunanidhi and paid a tuition fee of milk every morning and evening.

My music lessons were actually my first political studies. I learnt about the oppression of humans based on their caste. I saw the delight with which certain individuals could humiliate others, and the self-righteousness of others in carrying out their customs without realising that they were mistreating a large majority of the people.

At the age of 12, he left to Thiruvarur to start his high school. Karunanidhi started to organise school students for the anti-Hindi agitations. The deaths of two anti-Hindi agitators by the police made a profound impact on him. At the age of 13, he wrote his first Tamil historical novel titled Selvachandira.

== Entry into politics and early writing career ==
Karunanidhi entered politics at the age of 14, inspired by a speech by Pattukkottai Alagiri of the Justice Party, and participated in Anti-Hindi agitations. As a teenager he was captivated by the political writings of Tamil leaders including Panagal Arasar, Periyar and Pattukkottai Alagiri (after whom Karunanidhi later named one of his sons). Karunanidhi joined the anti-Hindi protests sparked by the provincial government's legislation making Hindi-education mandatory in schools, and in 1938 organised a group of boys to hold demonstrations travelling around Tiruvarur on a cycle rickshaw. The law was rescinded in 1939. The taste for activism however stuck and in the ensuing years, after a brief flirtation with Communism, Karunanidhi started following the work and speeches of leaders of Justice Party, Self-Respect Movement and Dravidar Kazhagam. According to Karunanidhi, he joined the Periyar's movement when he saw his father hurriedly rising and tied his towel to his waist from his head as a gesture of servitude when an upper caste landlord walked past him.

At the age of fifteen, Karunanidhi started his own magazine Maanavanesan (transl. friends of students). He along with his friends would make fifty copies of the magazine and circulate it and also sometimes mailed them to the leaders of Self-respect movement. A political activist after reading his magazine asked him to lead the forum for peace, liberty equality and justice, he accepted and became its elected secretary. Later, he dissolved the forum after there was a blatant attempt to convert the forum into as a front of the Congress party. He refunded the subscription money many refused to take the refund. Using the rest of ₹75, he started the Tamil Nadu Tamil students association in 1941. In 1942, the association held an annual function attended by Bharathidasan, K. Anbazhagan, and K. A. Mathiazhagan and student leaders from Annamalai University. He couldn't afford to pay for the invitees' and guest speakers' travels and expenditures, so he was forced to steal a gold necklace that his mother had made for him but which he rarely wore, pawned it for ₹50, and paid his invitees.

As his writings were gaining popularity in Thiruvarur, he started Murasoli to widen his publishing platform. Its writer and chief editor was Karunanidhi, and its secretary was his friend Thennavan. It had a large print run, was mailed to many Tamil political organisations, and was in the forefront of the fight against caste, social isolation, sophistry, and supremacy. He wrote a critical piece in Murasoli titled "Varnama, Maanama?" in 1944 when a conference was organised by conservatives in support of varna system. He penned an article named 'Ilamaibali' (Youth Sacrifice) and sent it to C.N Annadurai's Dravida Nadu magazine. It appeared in the next issue. For a week, he wandered the streets of Thiruvarur with a print in hand, persuading many others to read it. He also penned an article that was never published. Within a week, Annadurai arrived in Thiruvarur for a public gathering and asked for Karunanidhi, he was stunned to find Karunanidhi as an 18-year-old school student. He instructed him to cease writing until he completed his education and asked him not to send any more articles. Karunanidhi refused to go back as a school student.

He failed three times in his final exams. During the result day, unable to face his family over his third consecutive failure, he left to Thopputhurai in search of his classmate Asan Abdul Kaathar who consoled him. He then started his passion of writing as a career. In Thiruvarur, he started writing and staging plays. These plays served as a channel for the Dravidian movement's ideology to spread. In Thiruvarur, he presented a play named Palaniappan to raise cash for his student association. The total amount collected was only ₹80, despite the fact that the performance had cost him ₹200 to stage. He had no idea how he was going to repay the debt he owed to the individuals who were now harassing him for it. He travelled with his friend Thennavan for Nagapattinam, keen to take his chances somewhere else and met with R. V Gopal, a local leader of the Dravidar Kazhagam. Gopal sympathised with his situation but was hesitant to lend him the money but Instead bought the play for ₹100. The sale of his first play made his to write more ideological plays.

His parents didn't approve of his writing career. They advised him to look for a job that would pay him at least ₹50 per month. He was determined on not taking a regular job. Karunanidhi then fell in love with a girl. He was certain that the girl was infatuated with him as well. When he and his family met the girl's parents, they demanded that if a wedding was to take place, it must be performed in the presence of Brahmin priests and vedic chanting. Karunanidhi rejected, citing his belief in the Self-Respect Movement as justification.

After marriage, he worked as a playwright through the help of R.V Gopal who help his earlier with his play. Their first camp for the troupe was at Villupuram where he was joined by his friends Thennavan and C.T Murthy. Their plays failed to bring people even after the attendance of Periyar and Annadurai. The failure was due to their comments against the caste prejudices, the troupe was named "Dravida Theatre group", the term "Dravida" was perceived to be a term for Dalits and hence non-Dalits boycotted it. The troupe started to play in Pondicherry which was at the time a hub for social cultural and political change. His plays were an instant success and people started to call him as "Sivaguru", the name of his character. During his stay in Pondicherry, Karunanidhi penned "That Pen!" a criticism of Gandhi and the Congress centred on a pen which was lost from the Sabarmati Ashram, which infuriated the congress workers. He followed up with a piece titled "What If Gandhi Became Viceroy?" Later, members of the congress attacked a public gathering in Pondicherry attended by Periyar, Annadurai, and Pattukottai Azhagirisamy. Karunanidhi was chased down and beaten until he fell unconscious. They dropped his unconscious body into the sewers and departed, thinking he was dead. He was nursed back by an old women and taken to Periyar who applied medicines to him and took him to Erode along with him where he worked as an assistant editor with Periyar's Kudi Arasu magazine in Erode for a year.

== Early political career ==
Karunanidhi along with a group of young band of Tamil enthusiasts led by Annadurai dissented from Dravidar Kazhagam and formed the Dravida Munnetra Kazhagam (DMK) on 17 September 1949.

=== Kallakudi demonstration ===
The first major protest that aided Karunanidhi in gaining ground in Tamil politics was his involvement in the Kallakudi demonstration in Kallakudi in 1953 when he was 29. The original name of this industrial town was Kallakudi. Kallakudi was renamed as "Dalmiapuram" by the state administration led by Rajagopalachari to commemorate the North Indian business magnate Ram Krishan Dalmia, who owned a cement factory there. DMK wanted to change the name back to Kallakudi because Ram Krishna Dalmia depicted north Indian hegemonic power and predatory businesses. In the protest Karunanidhi and his companions erased the name Dalmiapuram from the railway station and lay down on the tracks blocking the course of trains. Six people died in the protest and Karunanidhi was arrested and was sent to jail for six months.

=== MLA and deputy leader of opposition ===
At the age of 33, Karunanidhi entered the Tamil Nadu assembly by winning the Kulithalai seat in Tiruchirapalli during the 1957 election among the 15 DMK legislators elected and were elected as the Chief Whip. During the 1959 elections of the Madras Municipal Corporation, he was managing the party campaigns, the party won 45 out of the 90 contested. He was elected as DMK treasurer on 25 September 1960. Karunanidhi was elected to the state assembly for the second time on 21 February 1962, from the Thanjavur constituency. He defeated Congress candidate A.Y.S. Parisutha Nadar. In the same year, he became the deputy leader of opposition in the state assembly.

During this time, Karunanidhi recognised the necessity for a regular engagement with party cadres. He began sending daily letters to his party members, whom he referred to as udan pirappukal (blood brothers), a practice he followed for fifty years.

=== 1965 Anti-Hindi Agitations and imprisonment ===
Anti-Hindi agitations in Tamil Nadu started when the Union government announced that Hindi would become the single official language. The DMK, led by CN Annadurai, planned to organise a series of rallies against the action and declared 26 January to be a day of mourning. Chants of 'Hindi Ozhiga, Tamil Vaazhga' (Down with Hindi, long live Tamil) were heard everywhere. Violence continued across the state and several set themselves on fire. Karunanidhi, the leader of the DMK's anti-Hindi agitation, was arrested on 16 February 1965, and was sentenced to six months imprisonment at the Central Prison in Palayamkottai. He was later released at 15 April 1965.

=== Cabinet Minister of state ===
Annadurai declared Karunnanidhi as a DMK candidate for the February 1967 Madras Legislative Assembly election, at the DMK's State-level meeting at Virugambakkam, Chennai. Karunanidhi, as DMK treasurer, raised ₹11 lakh for the party's election campaign. For the first time, the DMK was elected with an absolute majority in February 1967 and Annadurai became the Chief minister. After being elected to the Saidapet Assembly constituency in Chennai in March 1967, Karunanidhi was appointed as the Minister of Tamil Nadu Public Works Department.

On 14 January 1969, under CN Annadurai's administration, Madras State was rechristened as Tamil Nadu. Karunanidhi was in control of five ministries at the time: Transportation, Public Works, Highways, Ports, and Minor Irrigation.

== Later career as DMK President ==
=== First term as Chief minister,1969 ===
On 3 February 1969, the existing chief minister Annadurai died of cancer. On 9 February 1969, the DMK's MLAs chose Karunanidhi to lead the party with help of M. G. Ramachandran who his long-time friend. He was also chosen as the DMK's legislative assembly leader. Karunanidhi was appointed chief minister on 10 February 1969, the next day and was sworn in by Governor Sardar Ujjal Singh. Members of the DMK selected him as the leader of the DMK on 27 July 1969, a position that had been kept vacant during Annadurai's tenure in honour of Periyar.

The six Ministers of Annadurai's Cabinet were kept by Karunanidhi. In addition to his own ministries, Karunanidhi took on the ministries of late Annadurai and Nedunchezhiyan, who had refused to join his cabinet.

He once found himself in a difficult situation in the state Assembly when members of the Congress party and Rajagopalachari's Swatantra Party hammered him and his amateur ministers with hard questions. Swatantra Party MP HV Hande described his new government as 'third rate.' Karunanidhi sprang up and exclaimed, 'Sorry, this is not third-rate government', This is a fourth-rate government." The house was startled for a few minutes. Some people believed Karunanidhi had admitted to the government's incompetence. Then Karunanidhi indicated that his government of Shudras, the lowest caste in the caste hierarchy which enraged the opposition.

Karunanidhi started sending letters to his party members in Murasoli, opening with the words "Udan pirappe" (My blood brothers). These letters covered a wide range of themes, including the DMK's philosophy, his justifications for various party actions, and encouragements to party members to work very hard throughout electoral campaigns, among other things. Karunanidhi sent around 7,000 of these letters to party leaders between 1969 and his death in December 2016. They were later published in seven volumes.

Karunanidhi sponsored and presided over a State Autonomy Conference in Madras on 12 September 1970, which included Periyar, West Bengal Chief Minister Ajoy Mukherjee, numerous Parliamentarians, and other dignitaries.

During his tenure, he granted legal status to Self-Respect marriages and implemented a number of other programs aimed at protecting women and children. Karunanidhi's administration established the Sattanathan commission for backward classes in 1969 to recognise underprivileged groups and give them with representation in government employment and educational institutions. He implemented the "Manu Needhi Thittam", which mandated district officials to set aside a day every week to hear public grievances, and set up grievance redress procedures. Karunanidhi founded the Tamil Nadu Slum Clearance Board in September 1970 to build permanent houses for those living in slums. His government gave free eye surgeries for the blind from the 'Kannoli Thittam" In 1970, he proposed the Tamil Nadu Land Reforms (Reduction of Ceiling on Land) Act, which cut the maximum amount of land a family could possess up to 15 standard acres, down from 30 acres under the previous Congress rule.

=== Second term as Chief Minister ,1971 ===
In March 1971, Karunanidhi formed an alliance with the Congress headed by Indira Gandhi, on the precondition that her party will not contest in any Assembly seats. In March 1971, the DMK contests for both the Assembly and the Lok Sabha. The DMK-Congress combination beat the Swatantra Party-Congress (Organisation) alliance led by Kamaraj and C. Rajagopalachari. The DMK won a landslide victory, with its candidates capturing 184 of the 234 seats on the ballot. Karunanidhi is re-elected as Chief Minister of Tamil Nadu for the second time. He was elected from Saidapet.

Chief Minister M. Karunanidhi dismissed DMK's Treasurer M.G. Ramachandran from the party. He made this decision in response to a request from 26 of the executive council's 31 members. Karunanidhi later described the decision as "painful" at a public platform. The DMK send him a requisition accusing him of breaking party rules. MGR said he was banned because he "demanded the party's finances, especially those connected to elections". But the finances were submitted to the party executive committee. There had been conflict in the past, with MGR wanting to be Health Minister but Karunanidhi unwilling to satisfy him. On 17 October 1972, MGR founded the ADMK.

M Karunanidhi in 1970 issued an order that he said would "eliminate the thorn in the heart" of social reformer Periyar. The decree made it possible for people of all castes to become priests in public temples. However, the Supreme Court overturned this decision in 1972.

Until 1973, Governors raised the national flag in state capitals on both Republic Day and Independence Day. Karunanidhi protested in February of that year that the Chief Ministers were "ignored" on Independence Day and Republic Day. In view of the Rajamannar Committee's report on Centre-State relations(1969–1971) being submitted at the time, he was reinforcing his call for State autonomy. In July, Prime Minister Indira Gandhi gave in to his demands, announcing that Chief Ministers would now hoist the flag on Independence Day, while Governors would do so on Republic Day. Karunanidhi became the first Chief Minister of Tamil Nadu to raise the national flag at Fort St. George on 15 August 1974.

Karunanidhi launched the "Beggar rehabitation scheme" on his 48th birthday on 3 June 1971, and begged for funds for the scheme from shopkeepers near his residence, collecting ₹3,000 and said "Begging is not an insult to the person doing the begging. But it is an insult to the country and society that made him a beggar." Karunanidhi established the Government Servants' Family Benefit Fund Scheme to give financial compensation to an employee's relatives in the event that he loses his job owing to permanent complete disability, medical incapacity, or death. In 1971, his government increased reservation for BC from 25% to 31% and the reservation for Scheduled Castes (SC) and Scheduled Tribes (ST) from 16% to 18%. Karunanidhi established a separate Ministry for the Welfare of the backward class, the first such in the country. During 1973, women were first inducted into the police force.

=== The Emergency and government dismissal ===
He resisted to let the Emergency's on Tamil Nadu for approximately seven months, until his administration was ousted on 31 January 1976. Karunanidhi was a supporter of Jayaparakash Narayan's anti-Emergency campaign and was the first one to ally with his Janata Party. During an event at Don Bosco School, Karunanidhi stated, "Most likely, this would be my final public function as Chief Minister." He was dismissed before he even got home form the function. This occurred just 50 days before his tenure ended. The DMK suffered a great deal of damage once it was dismissed. 25,000 members of the party including Karunanidhi's close relatives and friends were imprisoned. His maternal uncle Murasoli Maran and his son M.K Stalin suffered health issues from torture and C. Chittibabu died trying to save M.K Stalin in prison. He sent ₹200 a month to their families of jailed DMK members through the party office.

A one-man Sarkaria Commission was established in February 1976 under Supreme Court judge Ranjit Singh Sarkaria, shortly after the Indira Gandhi government ousted the DMK administration after allegations of corruption were made by opposition leader MGR. DMK tried to make out that the investigation was an act of political vendetta. The Sarkaria commission described the evidence on the claims as "cogent, convincing, and reliable." Although none of the corruption charges against him were proved.

=== Opposition leader ,1977 ===
AIADMK led alliance won 34 seats out of 39 seats in the 1977 Indian general election. Top party figures such as general secretary V.R. Nedunchezhiyan, K. Rajaram and S. Madhavan quit accusing Karunanidhi for the DMK's failure in the general elections and demanded Karunanidhi to resign as the party's leader. Later, DMK lost the 1977 Tamil Nadu Legislative Assembly election, Karunanidhi won from Anna Nagar consistency and became the leader of the opposition.

On 29 October 1977, DMK supporters brandished black flags and yelled "Go back, Indira!" as she exited the Madras Airport for dissolving the DMK government in 1975. Indira Gandhi's vehicle was unable to pass through the black flag barrier in Madurai. Karunanidhi violated the police prohibition in Madras and led protests in Guindy. Karunanidhi and 28 other DMK leaders were detained the next day and were held in judicial custody. Karunanidhi claimed in two separate interviews, in April 2009 and in May 2012, that Ramachandran was ready for the merger of his party, AIADMK, with the DMK in September 1979, with Biju Patnaik acting as the mediator. However, the plan failed to materialise as Panruti S. Ramachandran, a close confidante of Ramachandran, acted as a spoiler and Ramachandran later changed his mind.

MGR offered a kind hand to the Morarji Desai government, while Karunanidhi renewed his alliance with Indira Gandhi. When Indira returned to power following the untimely end of Desai's government, she lost no time in dissolving MGR's cabinet. In the 1980 Indian general election and 1980 Tamil Nadu Legislative Assembly election, the state voted in favour of the AIADMK. MGR was re-elected as Chief Minister. Karunanidhi was elected from Anna Nagar consistency again. In February 1982, Karunanidhi embarked on a week-long padayatra from Madurai to Tiruchendur, spanning about 200 kilometres, in order to seek 'justice' for Subramania Pillai, a Hindu Religious and Charitable Endowments Department (HR & CE) officer who was found dead in November 1980. There were allegations that he was assassinated to cover financial misappropriation in the Tiruchendur temple. While Chief Minister MGR said the victim died by suicide, the DMK claimed it was an assassination. Karunanidhi walked over 30 kilometres during the day with a large crowd of cadres and leaders, stopping for lunch in small towns along the way. He gave public speeches in the evenings. The number of persons joining the padayatra grew by the day, and it became a topic of conversation in every family. The ruling government alarmed by the DMK's support, appointed a one-man committee chaired by retired judge C.J.R. Paul. The conclusions of the panel were never presented to the Assembly. Karunanidhi was able to obtain a copy of the study and disclosed it to the public in 1982 which revealed the panel's conclusion that Pillai had not committed suicide.

=== Resignation, 1983 ===
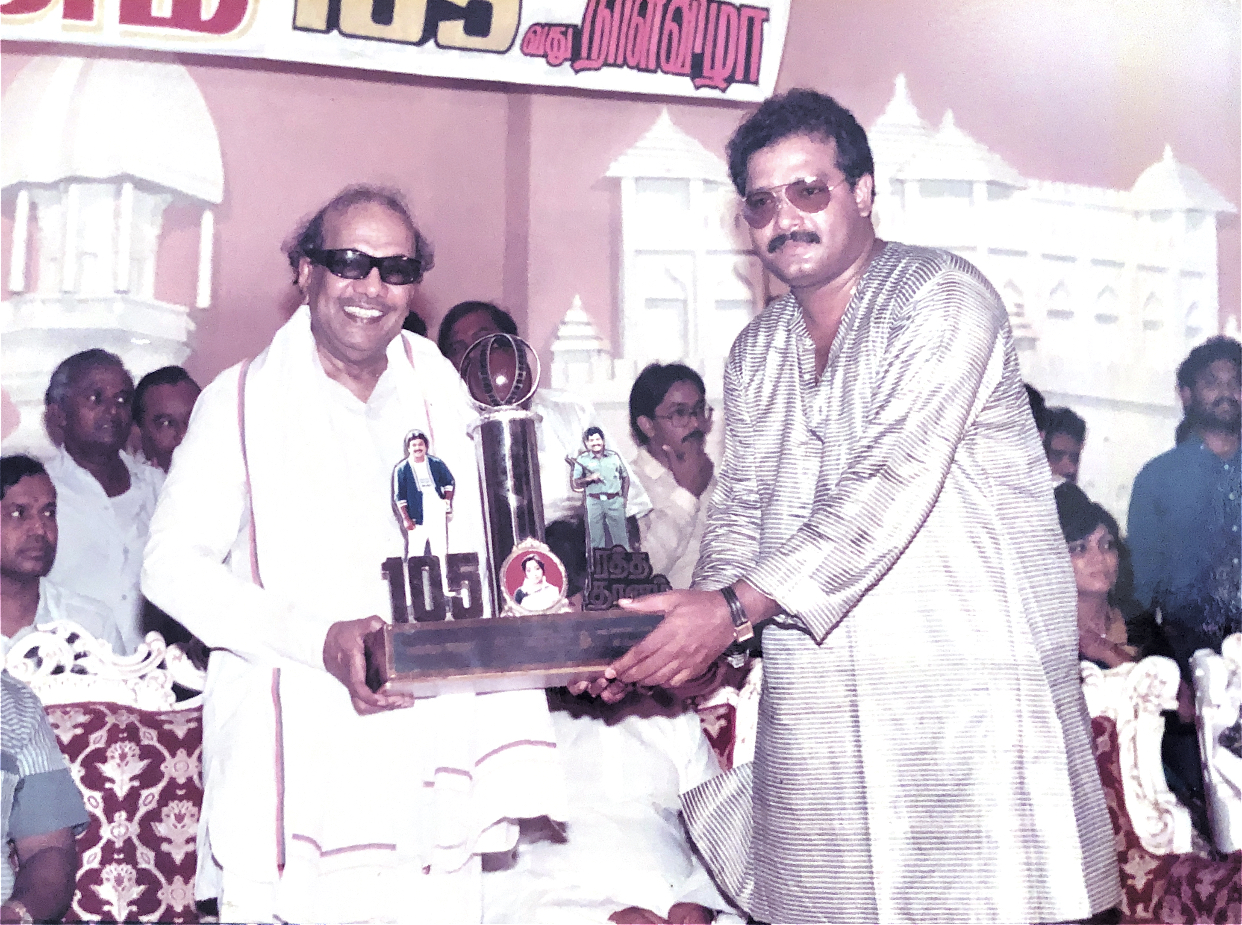
Karunanidhi in December 1988

Karunanidhi and DMK general secretary K. Anbazhagan resigned from the State Assembly soon after the 1983 anti-Tamil riots in Sri Lanka in protest of the union government and state's failure to defend Eelam Tamils. In May 1986, Karunanidhi established the Tamil Eelam Supporters Organisation (TESO) and held a major national conclave in Madurai to promote the Tamil aspiration for self-determination in Sri Lanka.

Soon after AIADMK's election win in 1980, Congress abandoned its ally DMK and allied with AIADMK. The 1984 elections took place against the backdrop of Prime Minister Indira Gandhi's assassination. In December 1984, contested as allies in both Lok Sabha and the State Assembly which conducted together and were carried to victory by the sympathy generated for Indira Gandhi and MGR who was undergoing a Kidney transplant in New york. After being voted to the legislative council in April 1984, Karunanidhi decided to skip the elections. In 1986, the MLC was however abolished by the Chief Minister, MG Ramachandran.

Karunanidhi was instrumental in bringing the seven-party National Front together in Chennai in October 1988. With a plea for social justice, he backed Vishwanath Pratap Singh and his announcement of the Mandal Commission Report. Earlier on 17 September 1988, he organised a large rally in Chennai with largely DMK members and a public meeting to commemorate the National Front's formation. It was the largest rally Chennai has ever seen. Its inauguration was attended by 20 top national opposition leaders, including three non-Congress(I) chief ministers.

=== Third term as Chief minister,1989 ===
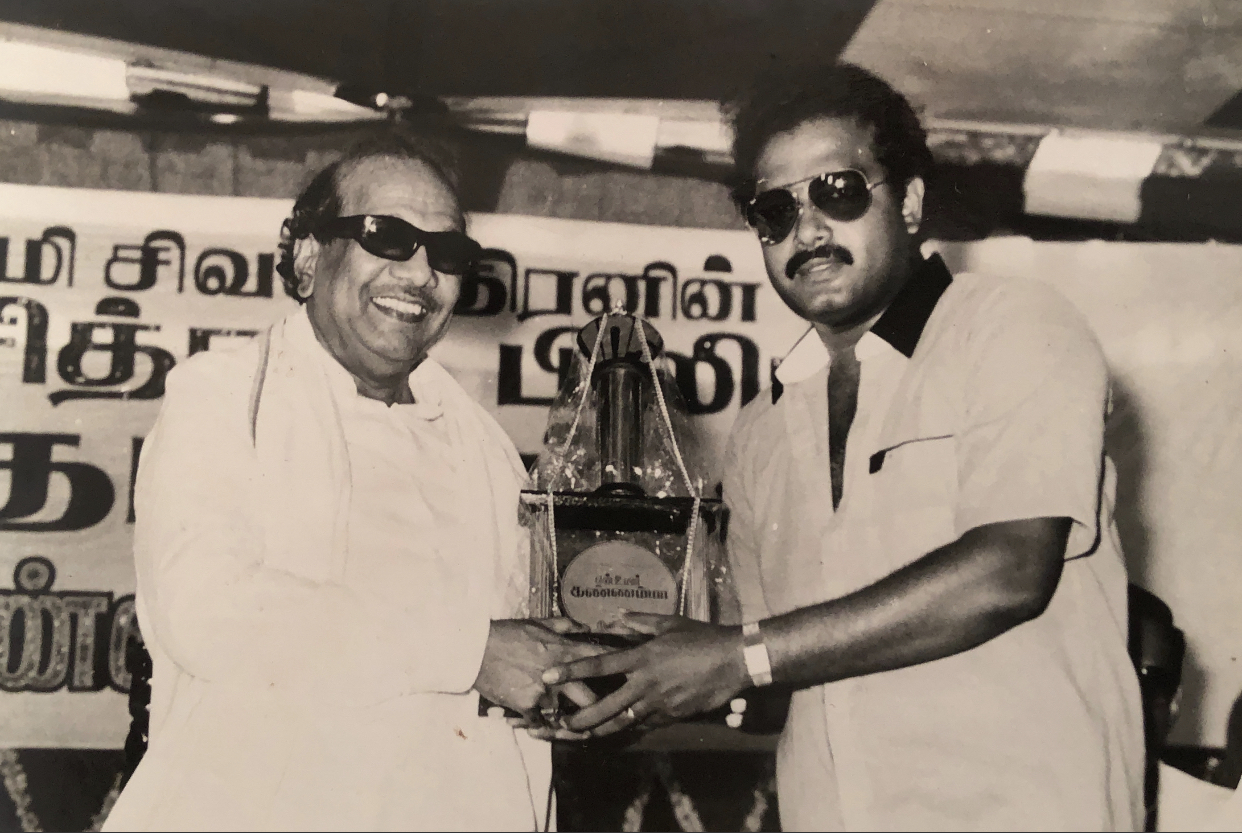
Karunanidhi in 1989

After a 13-year break, the DMK returned to power in 1989. Following MGR's death from a heart attack, the AIADMK split into two. The late Chief Minister MG Ramachandran's heroine J Jayalalithaa led one section, while his wife V N Janaki led another that helped the DMK. With about 33% of the vote, the DMK was able to secure a solid majority of 151 seats. Karunandihi was elected Chief Minister for the third time from Chennai's Harbour constituency.

Karunanidhi allowed the LTTE to use Tamil Nadu as a rear base for its battle for Eelam Between 1989 and 1991, even after Prabhakaran took up arms against the Indian Peace Keeping Force (IPKF). Karunanidhi accused the Indian soldiers of rape and massacre of Tamils in Sri Lanka and refused to receive the returning soldiers. The Karunanidhi administration was then dismissed and placed under presidents rule by the Chandra Shekhar led union government after only two years of its five-year tenure due to its inability to act against Sri Lankan Tamil militants. Despite Governor S.S. Barnala's unwillingness to report to the Union Cabinet that Tamil Nadu's constitutional apparatus had broken down, the government was dismissed.

He enacted legislations which provided financial assistance to widows and inter-caste weddings. In 1989, Karunanidhi passed a law giving equal rights to women in family properties. In 1989, Tamil Nadu became the first state to reserve 30% of government jobs for women. After announcing on 17 November 1990, that his government would give free power connection, he followed it up with a Government Order giving power connection to 12.40 lakh farmers. Women's self-help groups were first established in 1989 in Dharmapuri to integrate women and increase self-employment opportunities. In 1990, Karunanidhi separated reservation for Scheduled Castes (SC) and Scheduled Tribes (ST) which gave 1% separate quota for STs.

=== In opposition,1991 ===
The Assassination of Rajiv Gandhi by the LTTE took place during the electoral campaign for the 1991 Indian general elections. The DMK was accused in the incident and mobs vandalised the properties of DMK members and functionaries. The allies AIADMK and the Congress campaigned together and spread propaganda claiming that the DMK was to responsible for Rajiv Gandhi's assassination and it worked. The AIADMK-Congress coalition won a decisive win in the Assembly elections on 24 June 1991, and Jayalalithaa was elected Chief Minister for the first time. Except for Karunanidhi, Parithi Ilamvazhuthi was the only DMK candidate who was elected in the elections, and Karunanidhi resigned from his seat immediately.

Following the Demolition of the Babri Masjid in 1992, the DMK began holding rallies and public gatherings criticising the intentions of Kar sevaks. On 5 December 1992, Karunanidhi stated in Murasoli: "What does Kar Seva mean? God's service? Or The service of planting the seeds of unrest?".

=== Fourth term as Chief minister ,1996 ===
In 1996, he formed an alliance with the Tamil Maanila Congress, led by G.K. Moopanar, and was elected Chief Minister for the fourth time in the state. At the centre, he joined the Deve Gowda-led United Front government. Karunanidhi's party, which had only two seats in the 1991 elections got 173 MPs, nine more than the AIADMK had the year before.

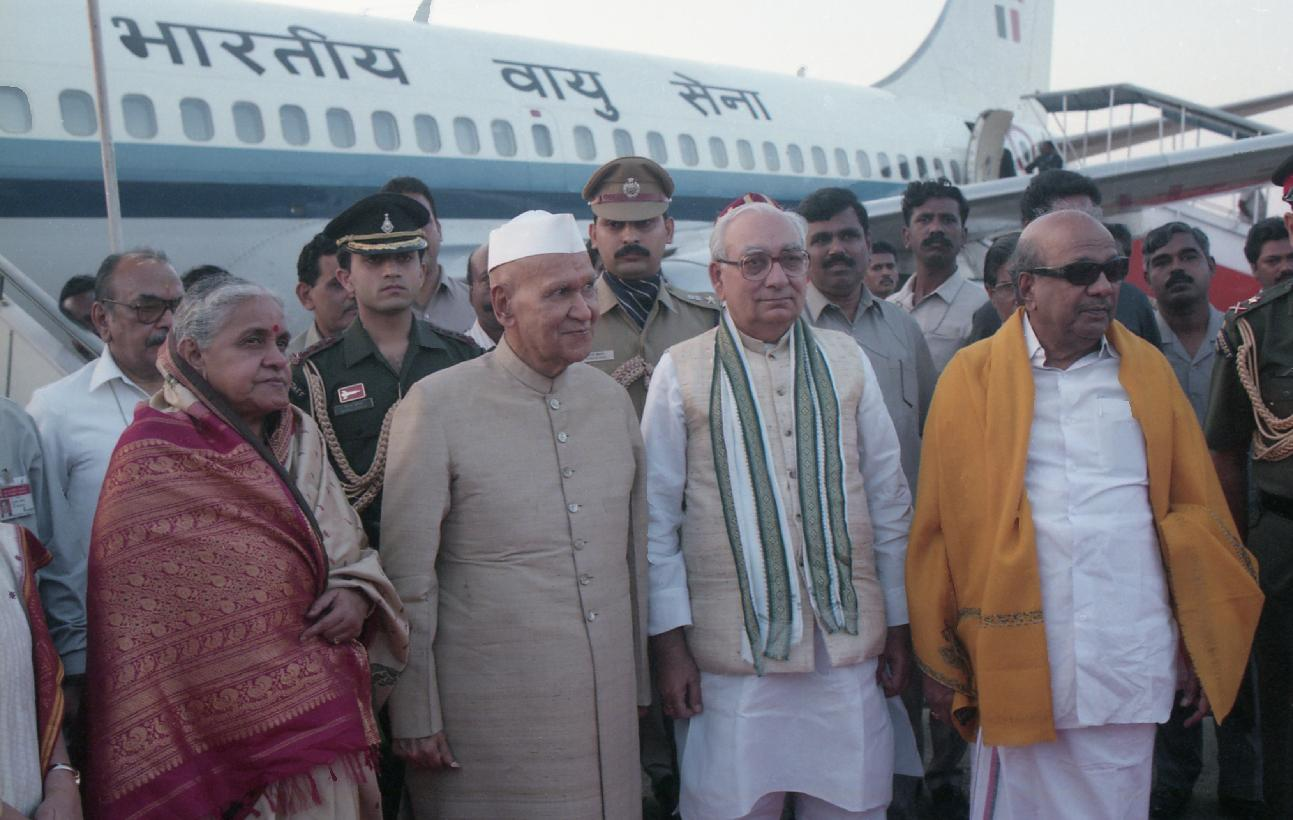
Karunanidhi along with Governor Krishna Kanta receives President Shankar Dayal Sharma in 1997

In 1999, Karunanidhi made his most significant ideological concession. The DMK joined the BJP-led National Democratic Alliance to fight the elections, portraying Vajpayee as a softer ideological character than LK Advani. The National Democratic Alliance won the elections. Following the DMK's support of the BJP, the TMC, CPI(M), and CPI withdrew. The alliance with the BJP put him under increased pressure from both within and outside of the party. Following the 2002 Gujarat riots, Karunanidhi stated that both DMK and BJP were simply partners in the NDA and that the DMK had no intention of forming an alliance with the BJP. "We are not affiliated with the BJP." We are members of the NDA, and so is the BJP. That's it. So, where does the matter of forming an alliance with the BJP stand?". Later, A Raja said that Karunanidhi told him that he regretted the alliance.

He had to deal with caste animosity in numerous districts of Tamil Nadu throughout his tenure.

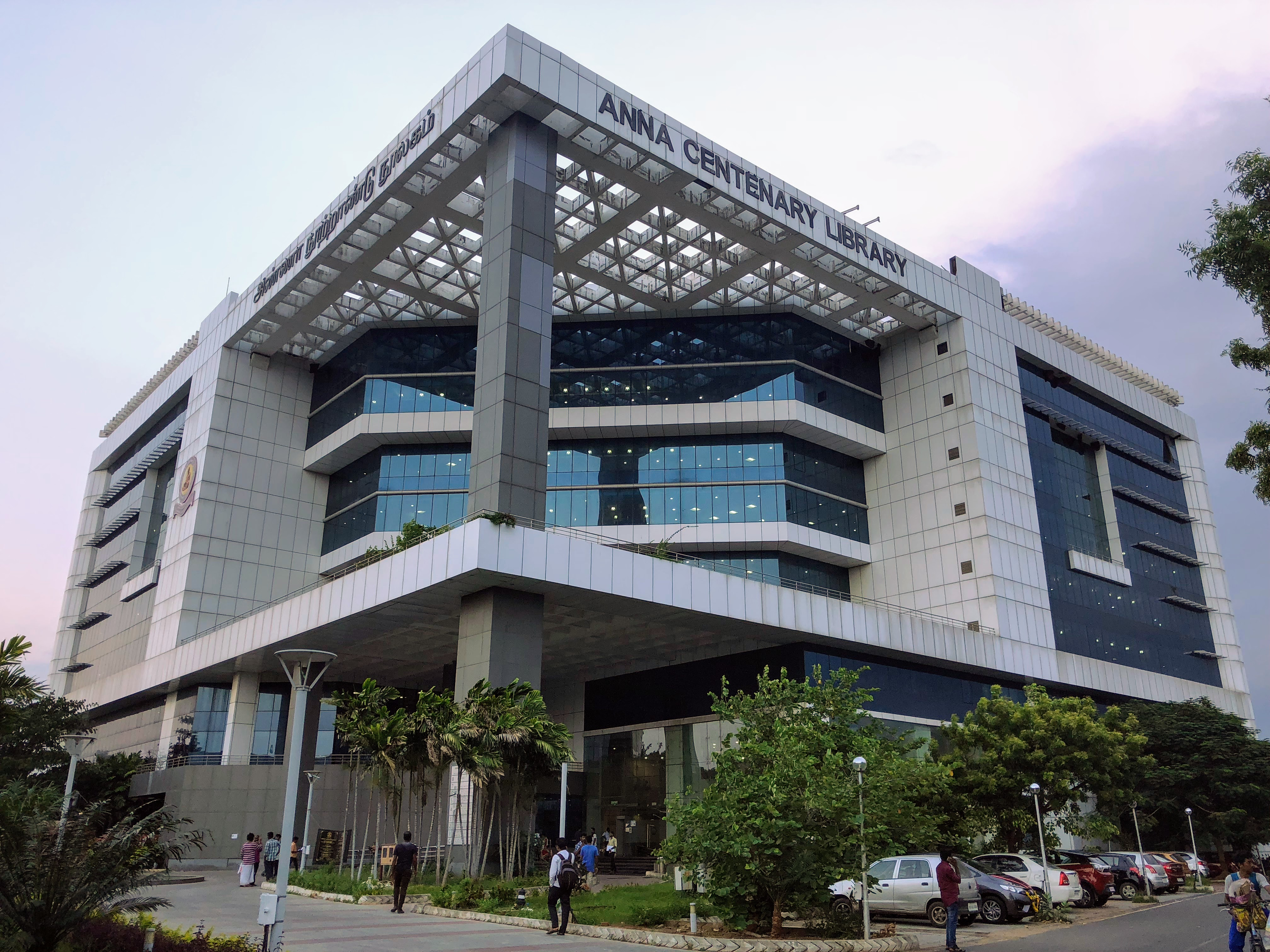
The Anna Centenary Library built by the implementation of Karunanidhi

In 1996–97, Karunanidhi introduced the free bus pass system, which exempted government school and college students from paying for a ticket while giving private school and college students a 50% discount. Karunanidhi devised the Uzhavar Sandhai plan in 1999, which aims to promote farmer-to-consumer communication and remove the middleman and helped farmers gain more remuneration. He opened the Samathuvapuram (Equality Village) schemes in 145 places in Tamil Nadu in 1998 in order to forget and to eliminate caste-based segregation. His administration was credited for accelerating the IT revolution, introducing mini-buses for connectivity. Karunanidhi renamed Madras to Chennai to reflect Tamil identity. He introduced initiative which gives free education for the first graduate in a family up to their graduation. His decision to phase out hand-pulled rickshaws was enthusiastically applauded, and the rickshaw-pullers were given alternative work. He introduced the marriage assistance scheme for impoverished women. His government introduced legislation establishing 33% reservation for women in local government.

He was responsible for almost all of the state's major infrastructure projects which were implemented during this tenure including the TIDEL Park, the Coimbatore flyover, the Koyambedu bus terminal, Gemini flyover in Chennai, the rehabilitation of Poompuhar, the Anna Centenary Library, and the grade separators in Chennai and the new Secretariat complex.

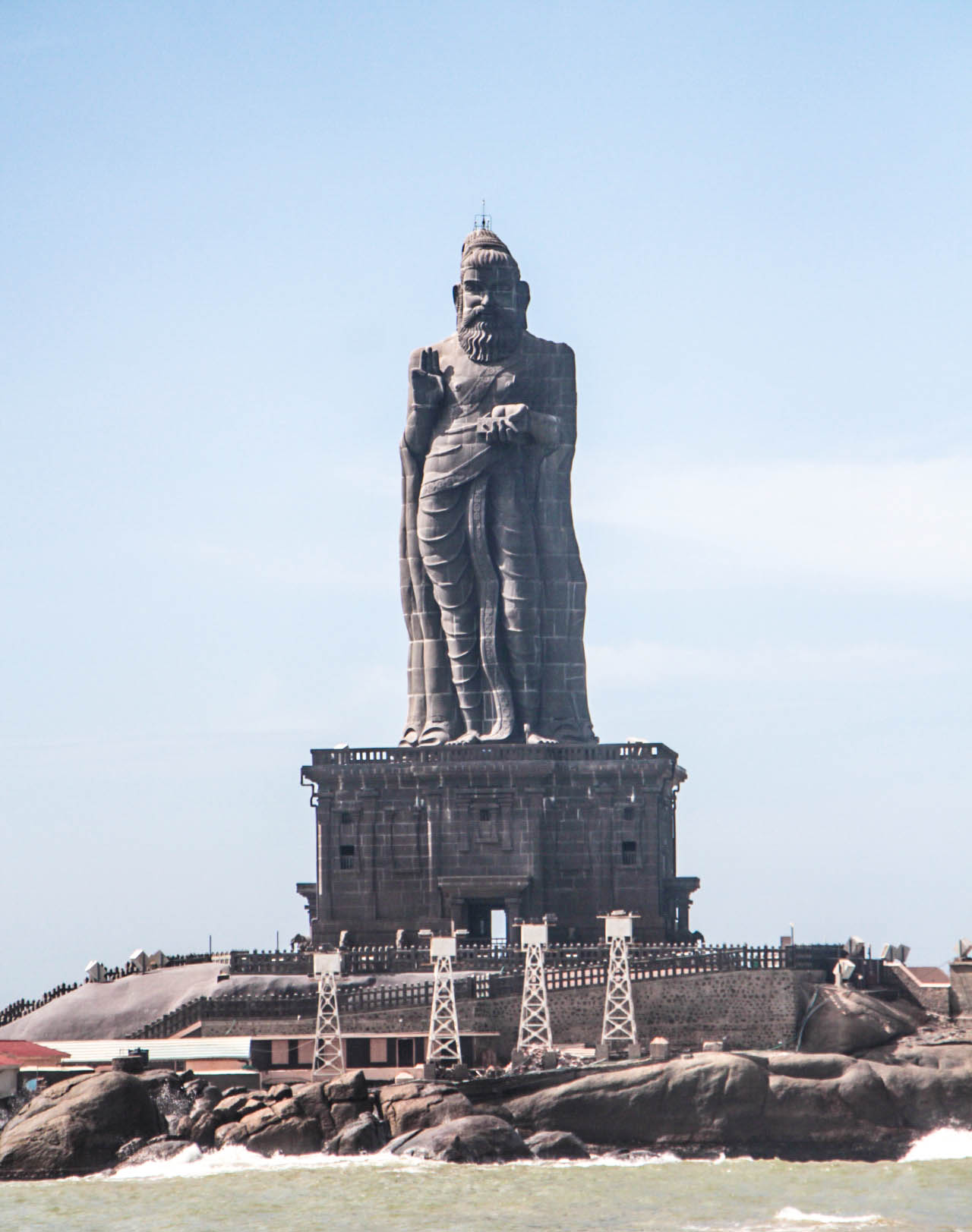
The 133 ft Thirvalluvar monument built by the implementation of Karunanidhi.

==== Thiruvalluvar statue ====
On 31 December 1975, during a state cabinet meeting led by Karunanidhi, a plan was authorised to erect a statue for Thiruvalluvar at Kanyakumari. The DMK administration was dismissed a month later, and the state was placed under President's Rule. During his next term from 1989 to 1991, he resurrected the project. In March 1990, when presenting the Budget, he stated that a 133-foot-tall monument of Thiruvalluvar will be erected in Kanyakumari. He launched the project six months later. The project was restarted once he reclaimed power in May 1996. He unveiled the monument on New Year's Day, 2000.

==== 2001 state elections ====
Jayalalithaa, who was aligned with the Tamil Maanila Congress, the Congress, the Pattali Makkal Katchi, with both the communist parties, and other parties in 2001 Tamil Nadu legislative assembly elections received 49.89% of the vote, defeating the ruling DMK-led alliance by a large majority. Karunanidhi assumption that the DMK will be re-elected on the grounds of its government's good performance proved incorrect. His government's performance was praised by voters but it was not transferred into votes. Karunanidhi was elected from Chepauk constituency.

=== Leader of the DMK, 2001 ===
He didn't want to serve as the leader of opposition. K. Anbazhagan was made the leader of opposition.

=== Controversy of arrests in Tamil Nadu about construction of flyovers ===
In the midnight 30 June 2001, he was arrested on the orders of J. Jayalalithaa as an act of vendetta based on a First Information report over of alleged losses of ₹12 crore on construction of flyovers filed by Commissioner J. C. T. Acharyalu who Karunanidhi had earlier kept under suspension. He was arrested after a few hours after the complaint with no time for investigation. Sun TV broadcast these images live across the state, the cops stormed in, busted open his bedroom door, and hauled him out. The images of Karunanidhi falling, being dragged, being lifted up and pushed by the police created a sympathy wave for him. T R Baalu and Murasoli Maran, two Union ministers, were also detained. Karunanidhi told reporters "They didn't have a summons. They didn't have an arrest warrant. They claimed that these were unnecessary. They dragged me. They pushed me. They ripped my shirt. We treated her with respect when we arrested her." Union Law Minister Arun Jaitley claimed it was a case of 'personal agenda'. The Union ministers were freed and the allegations against them were dismissed. Karunanidhi was later released on bail on humanitarian grounds. The police later dropped the case in 2006 citing it was a "mistake of facts".

=== 2004 general elections ===
Karunanidhi, on the other hand, left the BJP coalition in 2004 as the Union government refused to revoke the Prevention of Terrorism Act. He stood for the United Progressive Alliance led by the Congress party in the general elections, which won all 39 seats of the Parliament from Tamil Nadu.

=== Fifth term as Chief minister, 2006 ===
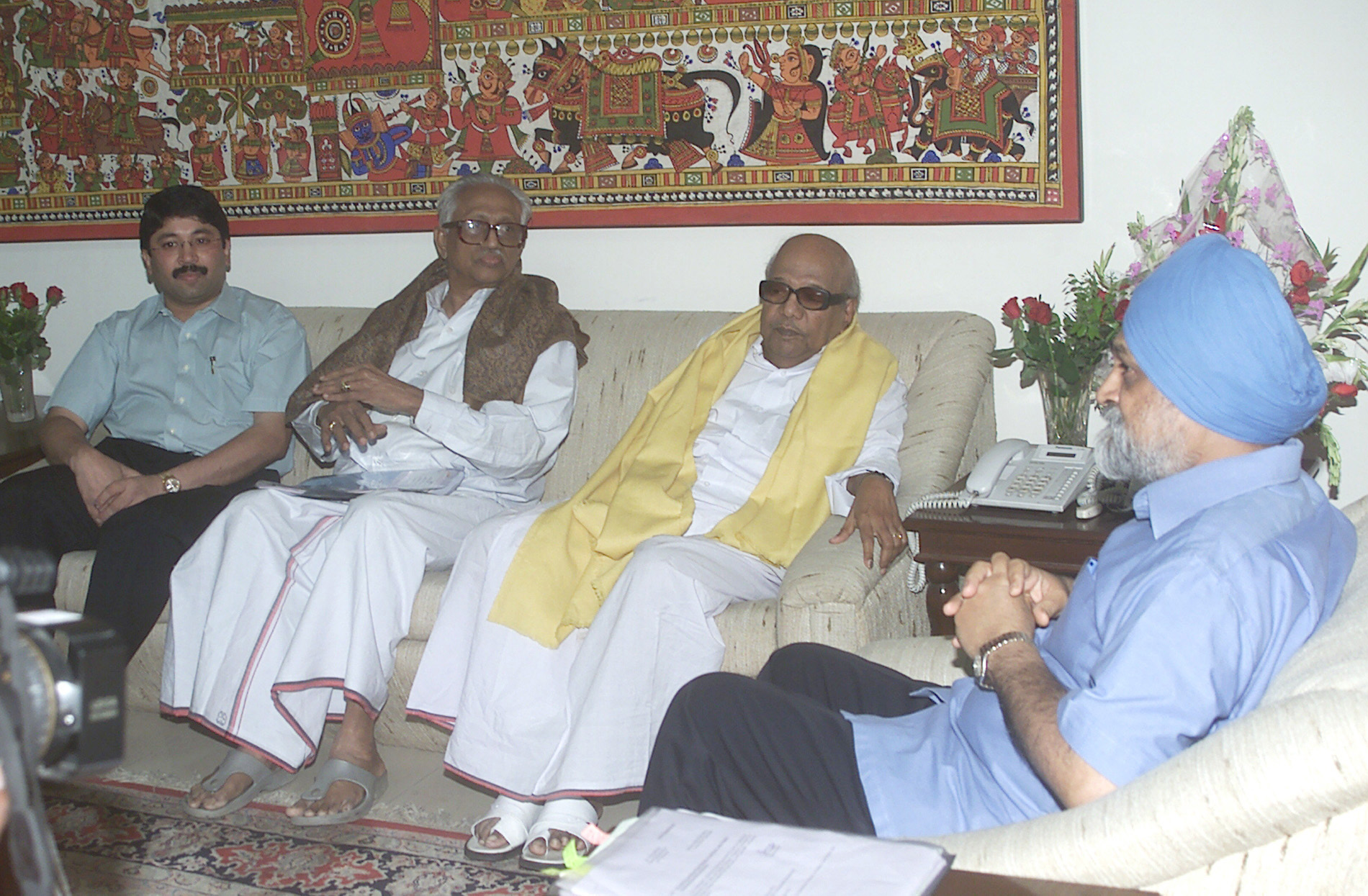
Karunanidhi meeting the Deputy Chairman of Planning Commission to finalise plan for the financial year, in New Delhi on 6 June 2006

On 8 May 2006, Karunanidhi's administration became the first minority administration in Tamil Nadu's history, and soon after declared a price cut for rice and the waiver of cooperative farmer loans, two of the DMK's main electoral promises. The DMK won 96 of the 234 seats and emerged as the single-largest party in the Assembly with the alliance of CPI-M, Congress and CPI. Karunanidhi won from Chepauk constituency.

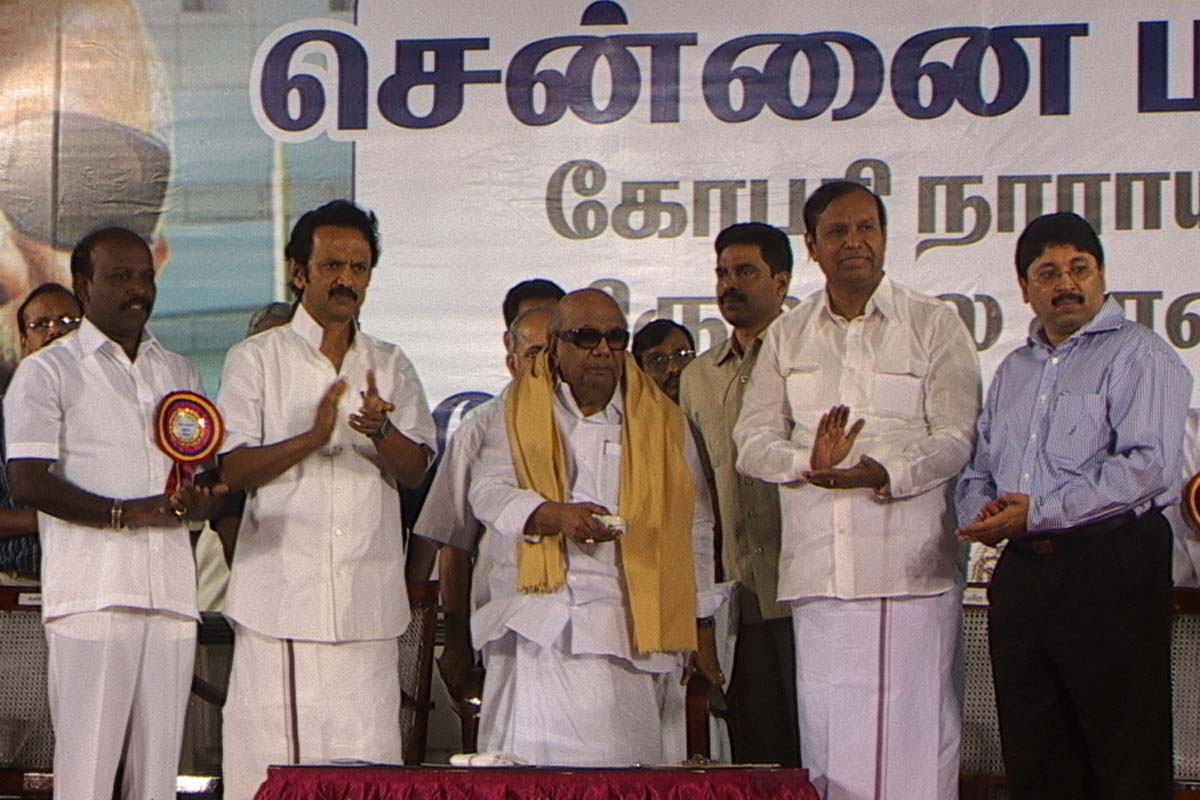
Karunanidhi inaugurating the flyover at G N Chetty Road – Thirumalai Road Junction, in Chennai on 29 December 2008

Karunanidhi in January 2009 threatened to resign from the ruling alliance if India does not assist in securing a cease-fire in the Sri Lankan civil war.

In 2006, the DMK administration formed 30 special welfare boards entrusted with lobbying for the rights of disadvantaged and marginalised people ranging from transgender people to construction workers who may not have political influence or form voting groups and endure many forms of oppression. In 2006, Karunanidhi introduced the 'Anaithu Grama Anna Marumalarchi Thittam,' which aimed for the establishment of a library in each village panchayat. In September 2006, he implemented the free land distribution scheme for the benefit of the landless poor. Karunanidhi saw the value of the ramp as a wheelchair user. He mandated that all new government buildings, as well as existing ones, include a ramp and an elevator. He reserved 3% of government jobs for the physically challenged. He launched the free gas connection distribution scheme in mid-January 2007. In September 2008, he declared that 1 kg of rice will be offered at ₹1 at PDS stores, surpassing the campaign promise of ₹2. In 2009, he introduced a special quota of 3 per cent reservations for the Arunthathiyar community. In 2019, the Arunthathiyars started building a temple "as a mark of thanksgiving to Kalaignar". Karunanidhi launched the "Kalaignar Kapitu Thitam" in 2009 to give people from economically disadvantaged backgrounds receive quality medical treatments without discrimination. At least 3 out of 5 people in the state have medical insurance due to this scheme. In 2010, he introduced the "Kalaignar Veetu Vasathi Thittam" to convert thatched huts to concrete houses in the state. During this tenure he implemented the construction of new Collectorates in nine districts, many universities were established, and highways and flyovers were built. The bus terminal in Koyambedu in Chennai, which is the largest in Asia, was built. His health-care initiatives in the tenure, which included financial help for pregnant mothers, were well received by Jayalalithaa. Multiple medical camps were held around the state as part of the Varumun Kappom Thittam initiative, benefiting a huge portion of Tamil Nadu's population. Schemes were implemented to provide free colour TVs to every family with ration cards and to provide gas stoves with free gas connection to the poor women who use wood stove-kerosene stove.

=== In opposition,2011 ===
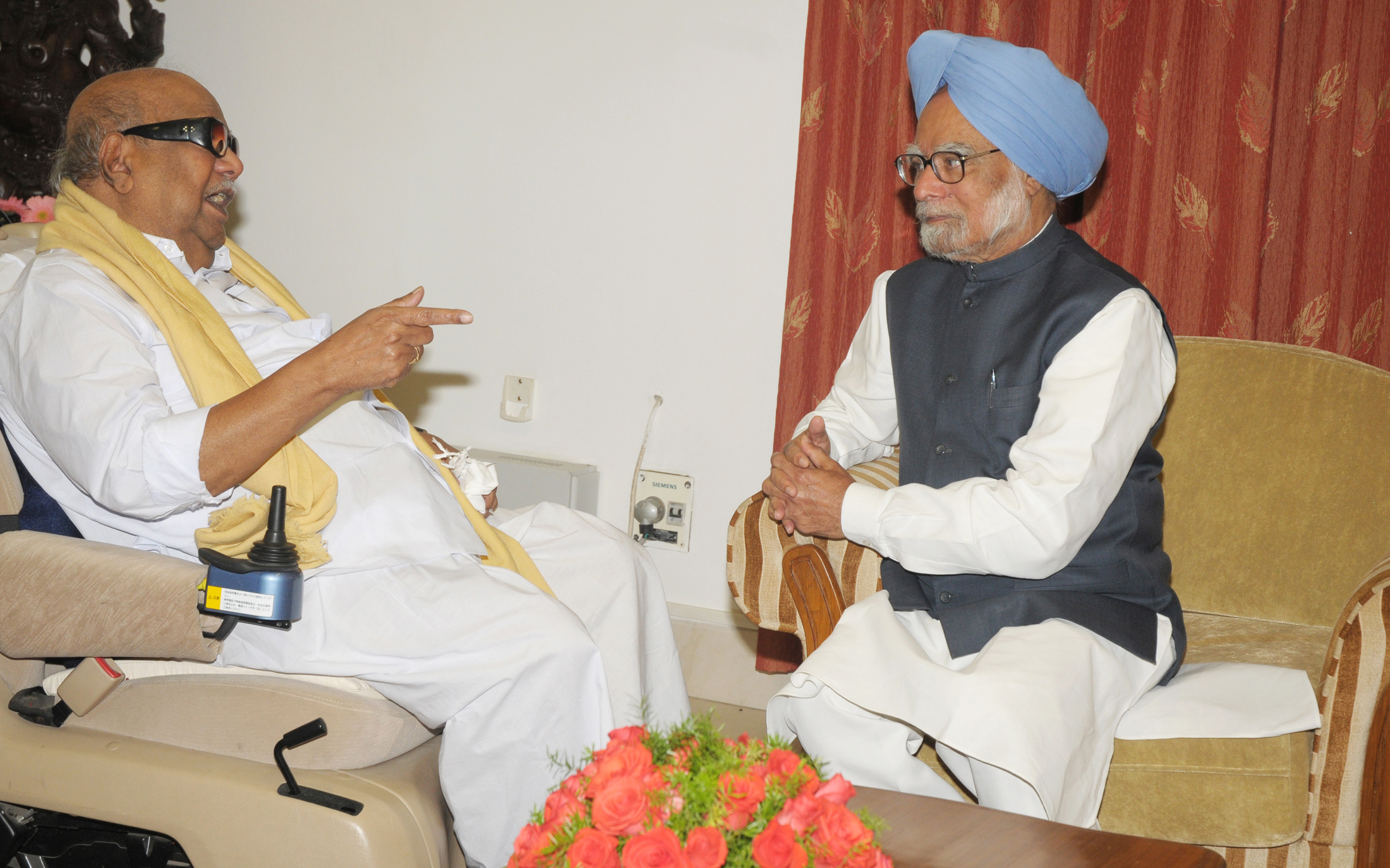
Karunanidhi meeting the then Prime Minister, Manmohan Singh, in Chennai, 2011

During the 2011 Tamil Nadu Legislative Assembly election, the AIADMK alliance won 203 seats and the DMK alliance won 31. Karunanidi won by a huge margin of 50,249 votes Tiruvarur Assembly constituency. Following the defeat, M. Karunanidhi said, "People have given me proper rest," before congratulating the people of the state. (Made stalin as legislative leader)

On his 86th birthday, Karunanidhi donated his Gopalapuram home to the Annai Anjugam Trust, which would manage a free hospital for the underprivileged after his and his wife's demise.

During the 2016 Tamil Nadu Assembly Elections, which the DMK lost only by 1.5 per cent votes. Karunanidhi won from Tiruvarur constituency with margin of 68,366 votes thereby recording his 13th straight victory since 1957.

In 2013, Karunanidhi announced his younger son M. K. Stalin was his successor, confirmed in 2016.

== Political positions ==
=== Sri Lankan Civil War ===
Karunanidhi was known among his supporters as the "Tamil Inaththalaivar" (transl. leader of the Tamil race) He was close to numerous Sri Lankan Tamil politicians. In 1956, Karunanidhi issued a resolution at the DMK council in Chidambaram denouncing Sri Lanka's 'Sinhala Only policy'. He was acquainted with S.J.V. Chelvanayakam and was close with A. Amirthalingam, the head of the Tamil United Liberation Front. After 1977 anti-Tamil pogrom and 1983 anti-Tamil pogrom, his administration was at the forefront of organising protest demonstrations in Tamil Nadu. In protest at the 1983 riots, Karunanidhi and DMK general secretary K. Anbazhagan resigned from the State Assembly.

The DMK was thought to support the Tamil Eelam Liberation Organization (TELO). After the LTTE started a war against its fellow Tamil militant group TELO in May 1986, Karunanidhi was sceptical of the LTTE's strategy. Karunanidhi founded the Tamil Eelam Supporters Organisation (TESO) and held a large national conference in Madurai in May 1986 to emphasise the Tamil aspiration for sovereignty in Sri Lanka, during which he urged the LTTE to cease murdering TELO cadre. The LTTE then proceeded to kill the majority of the TELO cadres. The infighting was criticised by Karunanidhi as Sagodhara Yudham' (A Battle Between Brothers). Since the AIADMK and MGR were prepared to support the LTTE as the only representation of Sri Lankan Tamils, his constant attempts to convey the necessity for an unified front to the LTTE were ignored. Karunanidhi was a vocal opponent of the decision to send Indian peace keeping forces (IPKF) to Sri Lanka as part of the Indo-Sri Lankan Accord, and he was accused of being anti-national for his outspoken criticism of the atrocities perpetrated by the IPKF. He viewed the expulsion of Muslims from the North by the LTTE in 1990 as "ethnic cleansing." His inaction against the LTTE in the state finally led to the Chandrasekhar government dismissing his cabinet in January 1991. After the assassination of Rajiv Gandhi by LTTE he was not friendly with the overt LTTE sympathizers in the state.

He ordered a special investigation of the conditions in the Tamil refugee camps in 2006, and subsequently provided funds to repair deteriorating dwellings. In 2009, during the final stages of the war, Karunanidhi was unable to convince the UPA alliance to intervene.

=== Tamil language ===
Karunanidhi on multiple occasions, expressed his admiration for Thiruvalluvar. The DMK administration built Valluvar Kottam, a memorial in Chennai dedicated to Valluvar in the mid-1970s. However, the government was removed from power in 1976, just weeks before the memorial was to be opened. Karunanidhi awaited 13 years to visit the memorial, and when the DMK regained power in January 1989, he held the swearing-in ceremony there. Karunanidhi built the Silappadikaram Art Gallery in Poompuhar and a special department for Tamil development as Chief Minister. His administration passed an order making Tamil obligatory in all schools until Class X a few weeks after he became Chief Minister in May 2006. Karunanidhi, a supporter of the two-language formula, had stressed the need of retaining English as the sole additional language in educational institutions. After consulting with scholars, his government determined in 1972 that Thiruvalluvar was born in 31 BCE. Karunanidhi and Congress leader Sonia Gandhi were vital in ensuring classical language status to Tamil in 2004.

==== World Tamil Conference ====
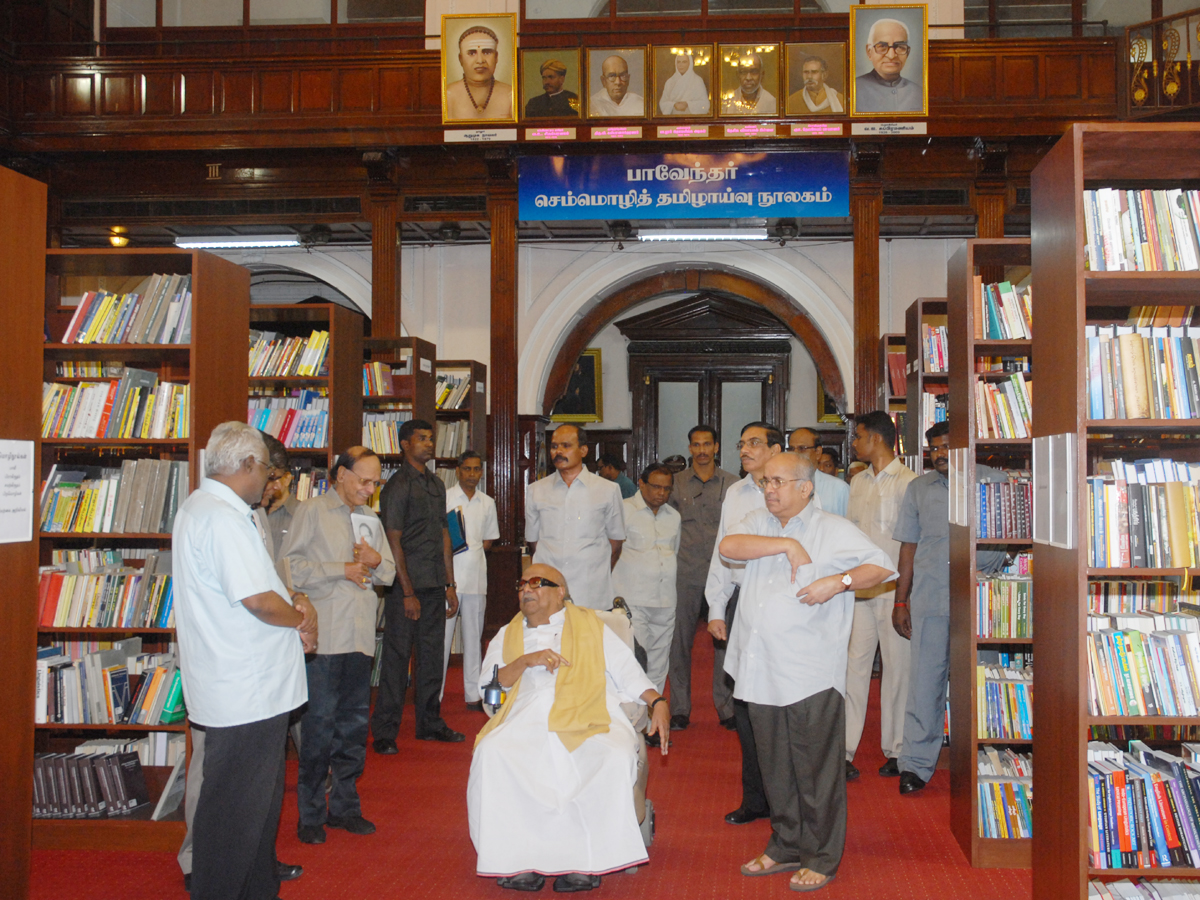
Karunanidhi in Paavendhar Tamil Literature & Research library

He delivered the special address on the inaugural day of 3rd World Tamil Conference held in Paris in 1970, and also on the inaugural day of 6th World Tamil Conference held in Kuala Lumpur (Malaysia) in 1987. He penned the song "Semmozhiyaana Tamizh Mozhiyaam", the official theme song for the World Classical Tamil Conference 2010, that was set to tune by A. R. Rahman.

In June 2010, his administration organised the World Classical Tamil Conference in Coimbatore. 'Ulaga Tamizh Manadu' (World Tamil Conference), was the first coined word for the conference in 2010, however the IATR organisation that had right to conduct the conference was not happy hence change in name. In the conference, Karunanidhi described Tamil as supreme among all classical languages. He reinforced the demand for Tamil to be recognised as a language of the Madras High Court. Karunanidhi announced the foundation of the World Tholkappiyar Classical Tamil Sangam, that would include worldwide academics and will be based in Madurai, to hold World Classical Tamil Conferences at periodic intervals in the future. and to bring dispersed Tamil research centres and develop connections with Tamil organisations throughout the world.

== Screenwriting ==
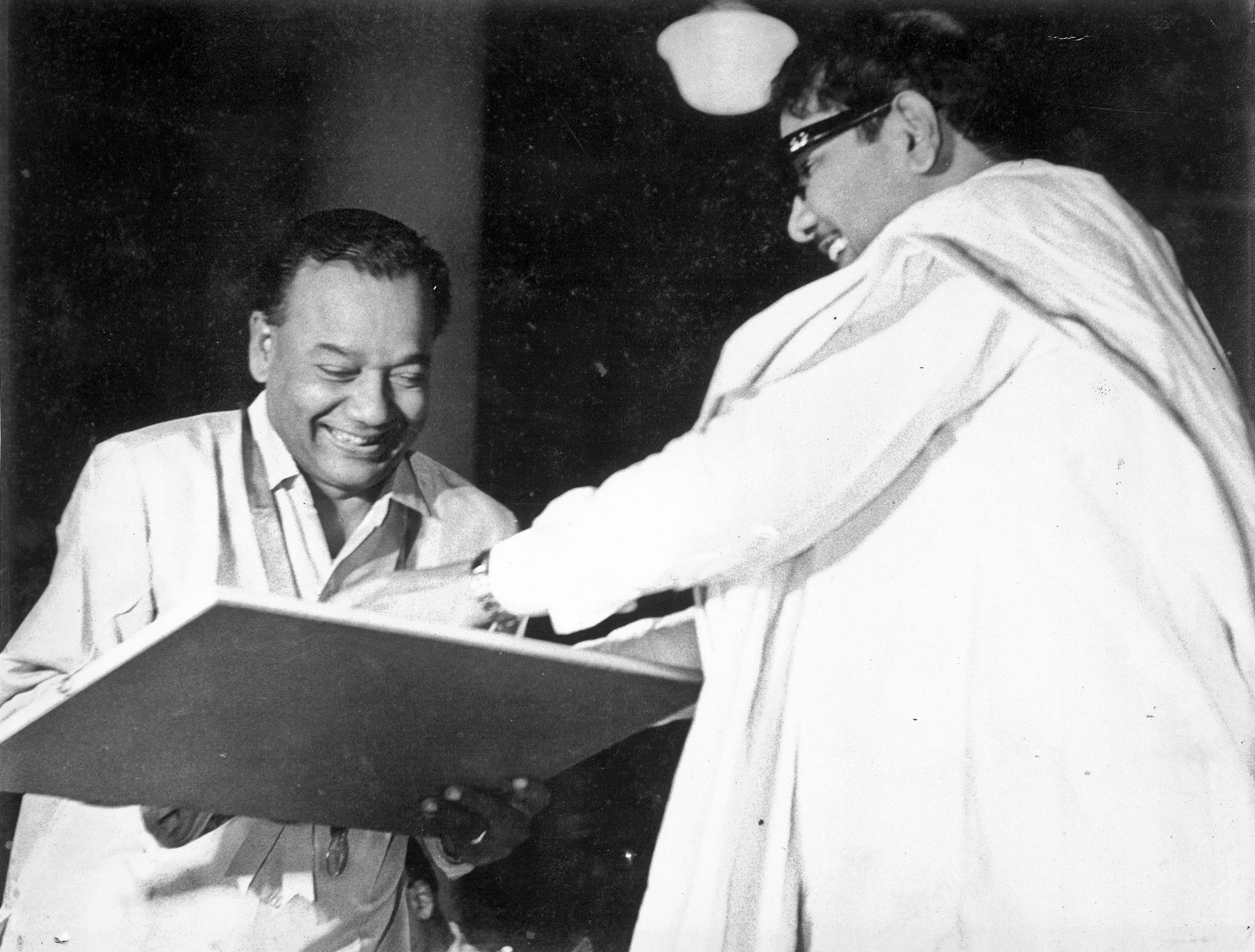
Karunanidhi awarding Kalaimamani

Karunanidhi began his career as a screenwriter in the Tamil film industry. His first movie as screenwriter was Rajakumari produced by Coimbatore-based Jupiter Pictures directed by A. S. A. Sami starring M. G. Ramachandran. During this period he and M. G. Ramachandran, then an upcoming actor and later day founder of AIADMK party started a long friendship eventually turning into rivals in later years politics. His stint with Jupiters Pictures then housed at Central Studios continued for another MGR starrer Abhimanyu, Marudhanaattu Ilavarasi (1950) starring M. G. Ramachandran and V. N. Janaki.

Around late 1949, T. R. Sundaram of Modern Theatres Studio in Salem engaged Karunanidhi as scriptwriter for the film Manthiri Kumari starring M. G. Ramachandran which would become be a blockbuster hit. Later T. R. Sundaram had Karunanidhi on permanent rolls at Modern Studio.

Karunanidhi chose to pen a script for a TV series based on the Vaishnavite philosopher-sage Ramanuja. He claimed that his party opposed Hindu fundamentalism, not Hindus.

=== Parasakthi ===
His most notable movie was Parasakthi, a turning point in Tamil cinema, as it espoused the ideologies of the Dravidian movement and also introduced two prominent actors of Tamil filmdom, Sivaji Ganesan and S. S. Rajendran. The movie was initially marred with controversies and faced censorship troubles, but was eventually released in 1952. becoming a huge box office hit. The movie was opposed by orthodox Hindus since it contained elements that criticised Hinduism. The story contained condemnation of Tamil Nadu's severe social disparities, India's power difference between South and the North, and the moral corruption of the Hindu priestly caste. Upper caste Hindus sought to ban the movie.

Two other movies that contained such messages were Panam (1952) directed by famous comedian and political activist N. S. Krishnan and Thangarathinam (1960) produced and acted by S. S. Rajendran another popular actor and DMK activist. These movies contained themes such as widow remarriage, abolition of untouchability, self-respect marriages, abolition of zamindari and abolition of religious hypocrisy. Another memorable hit movie was Manohara (1954) starring Sivaji Ganesan, S. S. Rajendran and P. Kannamba known for its crisp dialogues.

=== Writing and narration style ===
Through his wit and oratorical skills he rapidly rose as a popular politician. As his movies and plays with strong social messages became popular, they suffered from increased censorship; two of his plays in the 1950s were banned. He was famous for writing historical and social (reformist) stories which propagated the socialist and rationalist ideals of the Dravidian movement to which he belonged. Alongside C. N. Annadurai he began using Tamil cinema to propagate his political ideals through his movies. His compositions, which often chastised upper castes while it making heroes out of the poor and advocating secularism, were seen as revolutionary.

=== Filmography ===
At the age of 20, Karunanidhi went to work for Jupiter Pictures as a scriptwriter. His first film, Rajakumaari, gained him much popularity. It was here that his skills as a scriptwriter were honed, which extended to several films. He was active in screenwriting even during his later political career until 2011 when he last wrote for historic movie Ponnar Shankar.

==== As a scriptwriter ====
- Rajakumaari (1947)
- Abimanyu (1948)
- Marudhanaattu Ilavarasi (1950)
- Manthiri Kumari (1950)
- Devaki (1951)
- Manamagal (1951)
- Parasakthi (1952)
- Panam (1952)
- Naam (1953)
- Thirumbi Paar (1953)
- Ammaiyappan (1954)
- Manohara (1954)
- Malaikkallan (1954)
- Rangoon Radha (1956)
- Raja Rani (1956)
- Pudhaiyal (1957)
- Pudhumai Pithan (1957)
- Ellorum Innaattu Mannar (1960)
- Kuravanji (1960)
- Arasilangkumari (1961)
- Thayilla Pillai (1961)
- Iruvar Ullam (1963)
- Kaanchi Thalaivan (1963)
- Poompuhar (1964)
- Poomalai (1965)
- Avan Pithana? (1966)
- Mani Magudam (1966)
- Marakka Mudiyumaa (1966)
- Valiba Virundhu (1967)
- Thanga Thambi (1967)
- Pillaiyo Pillai (1972)
- Vandikaran Magan (1978)
- Nenjukku Needhi (1979)
- Aadu Paambe (1979)
- Kaalam Pathil Sollum (1980)
- Maadi Veettu Ezhai (1981)
- Thooku Medai (1982)
- Kaaval Kaithigal (1984)
- Palaivana Rojakkal (1986)
- Puyal Paadum Paattu (1987)
- Sattam Oru Vilayaattu (1987)
- Neethikku Thandanai (1987)
- Veeran Veluthambi (1987)
- Ore Raththam (1987)
- Makkal Aanaiyittal (1988)
- Paadatha Thenikkal (1988)
- Paasa Paravaigal (1988)
- Ithu Engal Neethi (1988)
- Poruthadhu Pothum (1989)
- Thendral Sudum (1989)
- Nyaya Tharasu (1989)
- Paasa Mazhai (1989)
- Kavalukku Kettikaran (1990)
- Madurai Meenakshi (1993)
- Puthiya Parasakthi (1996)
- Mannin Maindhan (2005)
- Kannamma (2005)
- Pasa Kiligal (2006)
- Uliyin Osai (2008)
- Pen Singam (2010)
- Ilaignan (2011)
- Ponnar Shankar (2011)

==== Television ====
- Romapuri Pandian (Kalaignar TV)
- Ramanujar (Kalaignar TV)

==== Lyrics ====
Year	Film	Song	Composer
1980	Thooku Medai	"Kodi Uyara", "Aayiram Piraigal", "Kurinji malar"	Shankar Ganesh
1987	Ore Raththam	"Ore Ratham", "Oru Poraliyin"	Devendran
1987	Veeran Veluthambi	"Surulu Meesai"	S. A. Rajkumar
1988	Makkal Aanaiyittal	"Aara Amara Konjam"	S. A. Rajkumar
1993	Madurai Meenakshi	"Neethi mandram"	Deva
2005	Kannamma	"Ilaignane", "Iru Vizhi"	S. A. Rajkumar
2005	Mannin Maindhan	"Kannin Manipola"	Bharathwaj
2006	Pasa Kiligal	"Thendral ennum"	Vidyasagar
2010	Pen Singam	"Aaha Veenaiyil"	Deva

== Literature ==
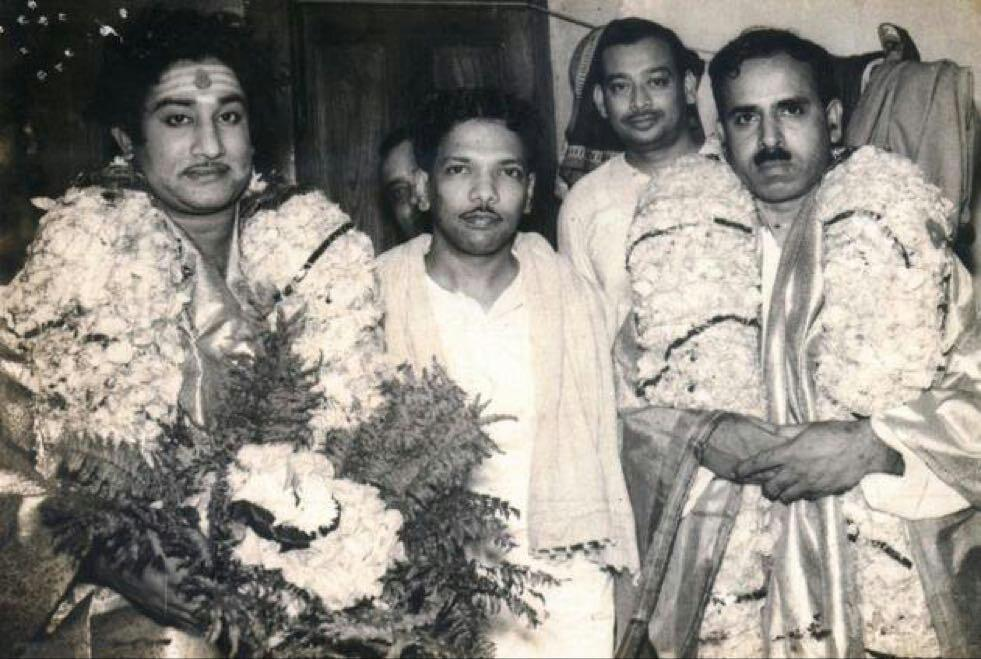
Karunanidhi (middle) with actor Sivaji Ganesan (left)

Karunanidhi is known for his contributions to Tamil literature. His contributions cover a wide range: poems, letters, screenplays, novels, biographies, historical novels, stage-plays, dialogues and movie songs. He has written Kuraloviam for Thirukural, Tholkaappiya Poonga, Poombukar, as well as many poems, essays and books. Apart from literature, Karunanidhi has also contributed to the Tamil language through art and architecture. Like the Kuraloviyam, in which Kalaignar wrote about Thirukkural, through the construction of Valluvar Kottam he gave an architectural presence to Thiruvalluvar, in Chennai. At Kanyakumari, Karunanidhi constructed a 133-foot-high statue of Thiruvalluvar in honour of the scholar.

=== Books ===
The books written by Karunanidhi include Sanga Thamizh, Thirukkural Urai, Ponnar Sankar, Romapuri Pandian, Thenpandi Singam, Vellikizhamai, Nenjukku Needhi, Iniyavai Irubathu and Kuraloviam. His books of prose and poetry number more than 100.

=== Stage plays ===
Karunanidhi's stage plays include: Manimagudam, Ore Ratham, Palaniappan, Thooku Medai, Kagithapoo, Naane Arivali, Vellikizhamai, Udhayasooriyan and Silappathikaram.

== Personal life ==
Karunanidhi married three times. Karunanidhi's parents were eager to marry him off to Padma, the sister of C. S. Jayaraman. He made one condition that the bride side must accept a reformist wedding. He hoped they would call off the marriage as he was not earning and the bride's father was religious but their family agreed to their marriage also held the marriage of their son C. S. Jayaraman the same day. He married Padmavathi Ammal on 13 September 1944, under the Dravidian movement's Self-Respect form of marriage where the bride and groom exchanged garlands, without a thaali (mangalsutra), and specifically without Brahmin priests presiding. They had a son M. K. Muthu, who was briefly active in Tamil films and politics. Padmavathi died in 1948 soon after childbirth. In September of that year, Karunanidhi's marriage was arranged with Dayalu Ammal, with whom he had three sons, M. K. Alagiri, M. K. Stalin and M. K. Tamilarasu, and a daughter, M. K. Selvi. Alagiri and Stalin are active in state politics and competed to be their father's political successors, before Stalin prevailed. Tamilarasu is a businessman and film-producer and campaigner for his father and his party; Selvi campaigned for Karunanidhi elections too. With his third marriage with Rajathi Ammal, Karunanidhi had a daughter, Kanimozhi.

Karunanidhi's left eye got critically injured in 1953 when the vehicle in which he was travelling got involved in an accident near Tirupattur. An eye surgery was performed and doctors recommended him to wear sunglasses to protect his eyes from the sun. Karunanidhi used regular spectacles. However, after following American ophthalmologists recommendation for his ongoing discomfort in his left eye, which he had been suffering from since the mid-1950s, he switched to his trade-mark dark glasses in 1971. Doctors determined that the dark glass frames were too hefty for him in November 2017 and advised a lighter frame.

Since 2004, he has had to deal with his deteriorating health and struggled to stand when a spinal operation went wrong and became wheelchair-dependent. After a few years, he upgraded to a motorised wheelchair and a customised van with a hydraulic system to raise the chair into or out of the vehicle easily.

== Illness, death and reactions ==
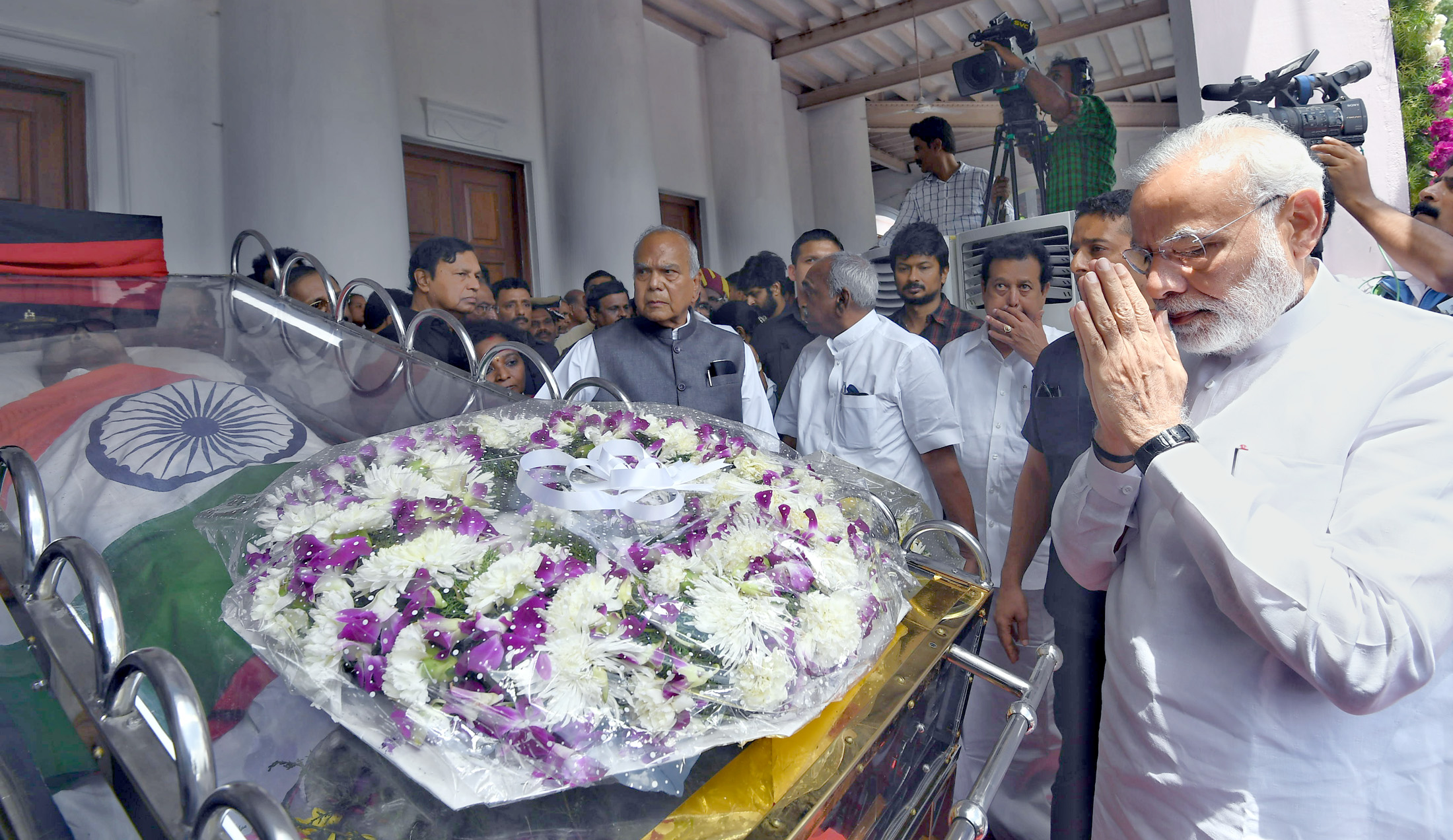
Prime Minister Narendra Modi paying tribute to Karunanidhi in Rajaji Hall

Due to a drug-induced allergy, Karunanidhi became unwell in October 2016. He was hospitalised in the first week of December 2016 for "optimization of nutrition and hydration" and subsequently for a throat and lung infections. He went through a tracheostomy surgery to improve his breathing. He has stayed out of politics since then, making just a few public appearances. His last public appearance was on 3 June 2018, when he turned 94.

On 28 July 2018, Karunanidhi's health deteriorated and became "extremely critical and unstable", and he was admitted at Kauvery Hospital in Chennai for treatment. He died there at 18:10 on 7 August 2018 due to age-related illness, which led to multiple organ failure.

The government of Tamil Nadu declared a public holiday on 8 August 2018 and a seven-day mourning after Karunanidhi's death. He was accorded a state funeral. A national mourning on 8 August 2018 was announced by the government of India. The national flag flew half-mast in Delhi, all state capitals and across Tamil Nadu on 8 August 2018. The governments of Karnataka and Bihar announced one-day and two-days state mourning respectively.

On 18 August 2018, the DMK said that as many as 248 party workers died, 'shocked' by Karunanidhi's demise, and announced a solatium of ₹2 lakh to their families.

== Awards and titles ==
- Annamalai University awarded him an honorary doctorate in 1971.
- He was awarded "Raja Rajan Award" by Tamil University, Thanjavur for his book Thenpandi Singam.
- On 15 December 2006, the Governor of Tamil Nadu and the Chancellor of Madurai Kamaraj University, Surjit Singh Barnala conferred an honorary doctorate on the Chief Minister on the occasion of the 40th annual convocation.
- In June 2007, the Tamil Nadu Muslim Makkal Katchi announced that it would confer the title "Friend of the Muslim Community" (Yaaran-E-Millath) upon M. Karunanidhi.

== Elections contested and positions held ==
Karunanidhi contested and won in all Tamil Nadu Assembly general elections (then Madras) since 1957 except 1984 when he didn't contest the election. He was elected in 1991 assembly election but resigned shortly thereafter, due to the reviving of his party, the DMK has secured only in 2 seats out of 234. He did not contest from more than one constituency in any single election.

Year	Constituency	Party	Votes	%	Opponent		Votes	%	Result	Margin
1957	Kulithalai	IND	22,785	47.32	INC	K.A. Dharmalingam	14,489	30.09	Won	8,296
1962	Thanjavur	DMK	32,145	50.89	INC	A.Y.S. Parisutha Nadar	30,217	47.84	Won	1,928
1967	Saidapet	DMK	53,401	60.96	INC	S.G. Vinayagamurthy	32,919	37.58	Won	20,482
1971	Saidapet	DMK	63,334	54.46	INC(O)	Kudanthai Ramalingam	50,823	43.70	Won	12,511
1977	Anna Nagar	DMK	43,076	50.10	AIADMK	G. Krishnamurthy	26,638	30.98	Won	16,438
1980	Anna Nagar	DMK	51,290	48.97	AIADMK	H. V. Hande	50,591	48.31	Won	699
1984	Not Contested									
1989	Harbour	DMK	41,632	59.76	IUML	K.A. Wahab	9,641	13.84	Won	3,236
1991	Harbour	DMK	30,932	48.66	AIADMK	K. Suppu	30,042	47.26	Won	890
1996	Chepauk	DMK	46,097	77.05	INC	N.S. Nellai Kannan	10,313	17.24	Won	35,784
2001	Chepauk	DMK	29,836	51.91	INC	R. Damodharan	25,002	43.50	Won	4,834
2006	Chepauk	DMK	34,188	50.96	IND	Dawood Miah Khan	25,662	38.25	Won	8,526
2011	Thiruvarur	DMK	109,014	62.96	AIADMK	M. Rajendran	58,765	33.94	Won	50,249
2016	Thiruvarur	DMK	121,473	61.73	AIADMK	R. Pannerselvam	53,107	26.99	Won	68,366

== Controversies ==
=== Ram Setu remarks ===
In September 2007, the Bharatiya Janata Party (BJP) opposed Sethusamudram Canal project stating that it will demolish limestone shoals the party claimed to be remains of a bridge built by Rama to get to Lanka to save his wife Sita. He replied, "It is said that there was a God thousands of years ago called Ram. Do not touch the bridge built by him. I ask who is this Ram? Which engineering college did he graduate from?" BJP leader Ravi Shankar Prasad accused Karunanidhi of religious discrimination when noting "We would like to know from Karunanidhi if he would make a similar statement against the head of any other religion." CPM general secretary Prakash Karat came to his support and said "in this country, there are individuals with religious views and people like us. It is not wrong to voice an opinion". Later, Karunanidhi clarified his remarks by saying that "I'm not against Ram, my conscience is my God".

Suspected Sangh Parivar activists attacked the house of Karunanidhi's daughter Selvi in Bangalore with petrol bombs and stones over his comments. A bus bound to Chennai was set on fire in Bangalore by a mob which burnt alive two people. The police blamed the attack on Hindu activists who were enraged over his comments. Karunanidhi said the attacks showed the "true culture of Ram Sevaks."

==== Remarks on Ramayana ====
In October 1998, at a book release function in Chennai, Karunanidhi criticised ancient poets for portraying the "Tamil King" Ravana as a symbol of evil, saying, "If you insult Ravana, you are insulting me." Citing Nehru's The Discovery of India, he described the Ramayana as a struggle between Aryans and Dravidians. Rama Gopalan, a Hindu Munnani leader rejected the Aryan-Dravidian reading as false, and BJP leaders said Ravana was a Brahmin scholar and Shiva devotee, and not a "Dravidian villain". Karunanidhi previously defended M.R. Radha's ban on a Ramayana play in 1954. He in turn lifted the ban on Ravana Kaaviyam in 1971 when he became the Chief Minister.

=== Connections with LTTE ===
In an April 2009 interview to NDTV, Karunanidhi made a controversial remark stating that "Prabhakaran is my good friend" and also said, "India could not forgive the LTTE for assassinating Rajiv Gandhi". An interim report of Justice Jain Commission, which oversaw the investigation into Rajiv Gandhi's assassination, had indicted Karunanidhi for abetting Rajiv Gandhi's murderers, who belonged to the Liberation Tigers of Tamil Eelam (LTTE). but the final report contained no such allegations.

=== Allegations of nepotism ===
Karunanidhi has been accused by opponents, by some members of his party, and by other political observers of trying to promote nepotism. Many political opponents and DMK party senior leaders have been critical of the rise of M. K. Stalin in the party. But some of the party men have pointed out that Stalin has come up on his own. Stalin was jailed under the Maintenance of Internal Security Act (MISA) during the Emergency that a fellow DMK party prisoner died trying to save him.

== Books ==
- Sanga Tamizh
- Nenjukku needhi
- Thenpandi singam
- Thirukkural Urai
- Payum puli pandara vanniyan
- Sindhanaiyum seiyalum
- Nerukkadi neruppuaru
- Pesum kalai Valarpom
- Anaiya Vizhakku Anna
- Yaaral? Yaaral? Yaaral?
- Sanga Tamil
- Oru thalai kadhal
- Pongi Varum Puthu Vellam
- Kaala Pethayum Kavithai Saaviyum
- Ilaya Samuthayam Elugave
- Kuraloviyam
- Kalaignarin kavithai mazhai
- Vaanpugazh konda valluvam
- Romapuri Pandiyan
- Iniyvai Irubadhu
- Mani Magudam
- Valimael Vizhivanthu
- Vellikizhamai
- Marakka Mudiyuma
- Kalaignar sonna kathaigal
- Ponnar sankar

== See also ==
- List of political families
- List of Indian writers
- Karunanidhi family
- First Karunanidhi ministry
- Second Karunanidhi ministry
- Third Karunanidhi ministry
- Fourth Karunanidhi ministry
- Fifth Karunanidhi ministry

== Bibliography ==
- Guneratne, Anthony R.; Wimal Dissanayake; Sumita S. Chakravarty (2003). Rethinking Third Cinema. Routledge. ISBN 0-415-21354-1.
- Ramaswamy, Sumathy (1997). Passions of the tongue: language devotion in Tamil India, 1891–1970. University of California Press. ISBN 0-520-20805-6.
- Panneerselvan, A. S. (15 March 2021). Karunanidhi: A Life. Penguin Random House India Private Limited. ISBN 978-93-90914-54-8.

Political offices
Preceded by C. N. Annadurai	Chief Minister of Tamil Nadu; First & Second Tenure; 1969–1976	Vacant President's Rule Title next held by M. G. Ramachandran
Vacant President's Rule Title last held by V. N. Janaki Ramachandran	Chief Minister of Tamil Nadu; Third Tenure; 1989–1990	Vacant President's Rule Title next held by J. Jayalalithaa
Preceded by J. Jayalalithaa	Chief Minister of Tamil Nadu; Fourth Tenure; 1996–2001	Succeeded by J. Jayalalithaa
Preceded by J. Jayalalithaa	Chief Minister of Tamil Nadu; Fifth Tenure; 2006–2011	Succeeded by J. Jayalalithaa
