= Tamil Eelam Supporters Organization =

- President: Karunanidhi
- Founded: 13 May 1985; Madras, Tamil Nadu, India
- Ideology: The creation of a separate Tamil state in the north and east of Sri Lanka

Website
- http://teso.org.in/

The Tamil Eelam Supporters Organization (TESO) was an Eelam Tamil supporters organisation founded in 1985 with Dr. Kalaignar Karunanidhi as president and K. Veeramani and Nedumaran as members for the establishment of an independent Tamil Eelam in the northeast of Sri Lanka.

When the Central Government of India ordered Tamil Eelam leadership to be sent out of Madras, thousands of Tamilians marched along the streets of New Delhi protesting against the provocative order. Five days later TESO successfully prevented movements of trains throughout Tamil Nadu as a protest against the extradition of the Eelam leadership. When the situation on the borders between India and Sri Lanka were tense, Nedumaran heroically sailed to Sri Lanka, videotaped the plight of Tamils in Sri Lanka and on his return, went straight to New Delhi to meet Prime Minister Rajiv Gandhi to apprise him of the situation in Sri Lanka. Rajiv Gandhi refused to meet him and thus showed his indifference to the sufferings of the Tamils in Sri Lanka.

When the Government of India sent an Indian Battalion to Sri Lanka as the Indian Peace Keeping Force (IPKF), the Dravidar Kazhagam protested against it. The worst fears of the Dravidar Kazhagam regarding the IPKF proved true within a week or two of its functioning in Sri Lanka. The battalion had to take orders from the Sri Lanka Government and naturally that Government employed the IPKF against the guerrilla fighters of Eelam. Very soon, Indian papers reported that the Indian Government was spending at the rate of rupees ten million per day for maintaining the IPKF in Sri Lanka. The general public then realized that making the Indo-Lanka pact was a historic folly on the part of the Indian Government awoke to the realities but stood on false prestige and did not wish to withdraw the IPKF. But the Government of Sri Lanka insisted on the withdrawal of Indian troops in May 1989 probably because this force tried to prevent the Sri Lanka army from hunting down not only the freedom fighters but the innocent Tamil civilians.

== Revival of TESO ==
On 20 April 2012 M. Karunanidhi sought the revival of the Tamil Eelam Supporters Organisation (TESO). After this announcement M. Karunanidhi got severe criticism from several other pro-Tamil leaders.

After several hurdles on 12 August 2012 TESO conference held as Eelam Tamils Rights Protection Conference at YMCA grounds in chennai.

== See also ==
- Tamil Eelam
- Sri Lankan Tamil people
- Sri Lankan Tamil diaspora
- 2009 Tamil protests Protesting Support for Tamil Eelam and Protesting against Sri Lankan Government
- Vaddukoddai Resolution
- Policy of standardization
- Self-determination
- North Eastern Province, Sri Lanka
- Naam Tamilar Katchi
