= Teso dos Bichos (archeological site) =

Archeological site in Pará, Brazil

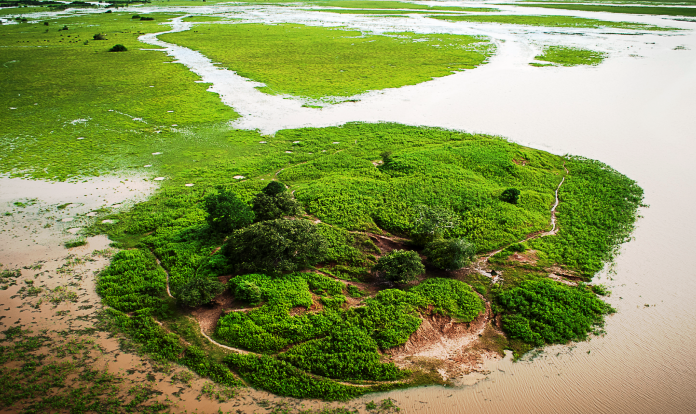

Geography
- Location: Marajó, Pará, Brazil

Teso dos Bichos is an embankment that forms an artificial mound, located at the archaeological site of Camutins on the island of Marajó in Brazil, a place where one of the most elaborate civilizations of the pre-Columbian Amazon existed (the indigenous Marajoara), occupying 2.5 hectares.

A teso is an elevated piece of land built with embankment, for protection in periods of flooding of the rivers (high tide), which flooded for several months in some areas of the island of Marajó.

The tesos were erected by the Marajoara, a society of indigenous potters and fish farmers who inhabited the region approximately between the years 500 and 1300 (before Portuguese colonization). They understood the climatic and topographical situation of the region and knew how to use natural resources for survival.

At the archaeological site of Camutins, which extends for 10 km along the Amazon River, about 30 tesos have been identified, the "Teso dos Bichos" being one of the best known examples of this type of mound.

== Anthropogenesis ==
One of the distinguishing features of the Marajoara is the use of "tesos", large artificial embankments with evidence of dwellings. The large scale of these structures would have required an amount of work consistent with societies of complex organization.

The civilization responsible for the work was estimated to have a population of 500,000 people. The inhabitants of this civilization belonged to a society of tuxauas, lords of the mouth of the Amazon River. There was a division of labor between men and women, a diet rich in protein (animal and vegetable) and fermented refreshments (such as aluá).

== River sedimentation ==
In October 2009, a group of geologists proposed that the tesos could be mainly natural structures, formed initially by processes similar to the fluvial formation of mounds elsewhere, and then harnessed and expanded by human activity in shallower layers. Because they required significantly less human activity for their formation, complex societies would not have been necessary for their creation. This hypothesis would partially invalidate interpretations about the existence of complex societies in the Amazon. However, archaeologists responsible for previous excavations have questioned the team's methodology, pointing out sediment columns too thin to ascertain the presence of artifacts and possible evidence of human activity unnoticed in the samples, but some admit that the new hypothesis could contribute to discussions about the lack of evidence of large-scale agriculture in the region, an open question of great importance in the study of the scale of Marajoara society.

== See also ==
- Pre-Columbian history of Brazil
- Archeology
