= Teso (archeological site) =

Riverside mound with embankment

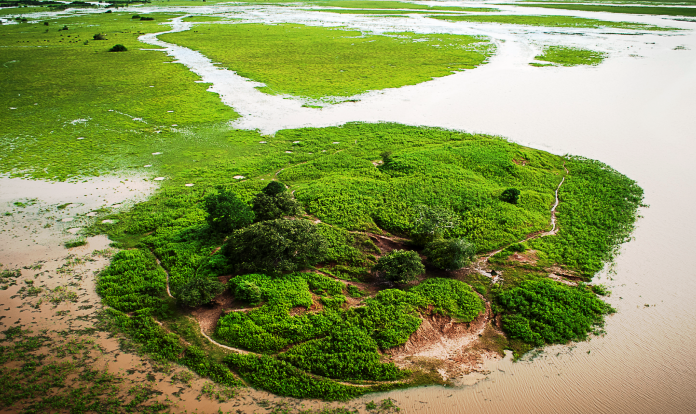
Teso dos Bichos

A teso is an elevated piece of land with an embankment that forms a mound. They are associated with Indigenous peoples who lived approximately between the years 500 and 1300, before the Portuguese colonization of Brazil. They can mostly be found on the island Marajó and were used for protection in periods of flooding of the rivers, which can happen for several months at a time on the island. The Teso dos Bichos is one of the best-known examples of this type of mound.
