= Kalina language =

Endangered South American Indigenous language

Kalina
- Galibi
- Kariʼna auran Venezuela: Kariʼña auran French Guiana: Kaliʼna aulan Suriname: Kariʼnja auran Guyana: Kalina aulan Brazil: Kariʼna auran
- Pronunciation: [kaɽiʔnʲauɽaŋ]
- Native to: Brazil, French Guiana, Guyana, Suriname, Venezuela, and Trinidad
- Ethnicity: Kaliʼna
- Native speakers: (8,600 cited 2001–2012)
- Language family: Cariban: Guianan Carib; Kalina
- Dialects: Tyrewuju (Suriname); Aretyry (Suriname)
- Writing system: Latin script

Language codes
- ISO 639-2: car
- ISO 639-3: car
- Glottolog: gali1262
- ELP: Kari'nja
- Linguasphere: 80-ACA-a
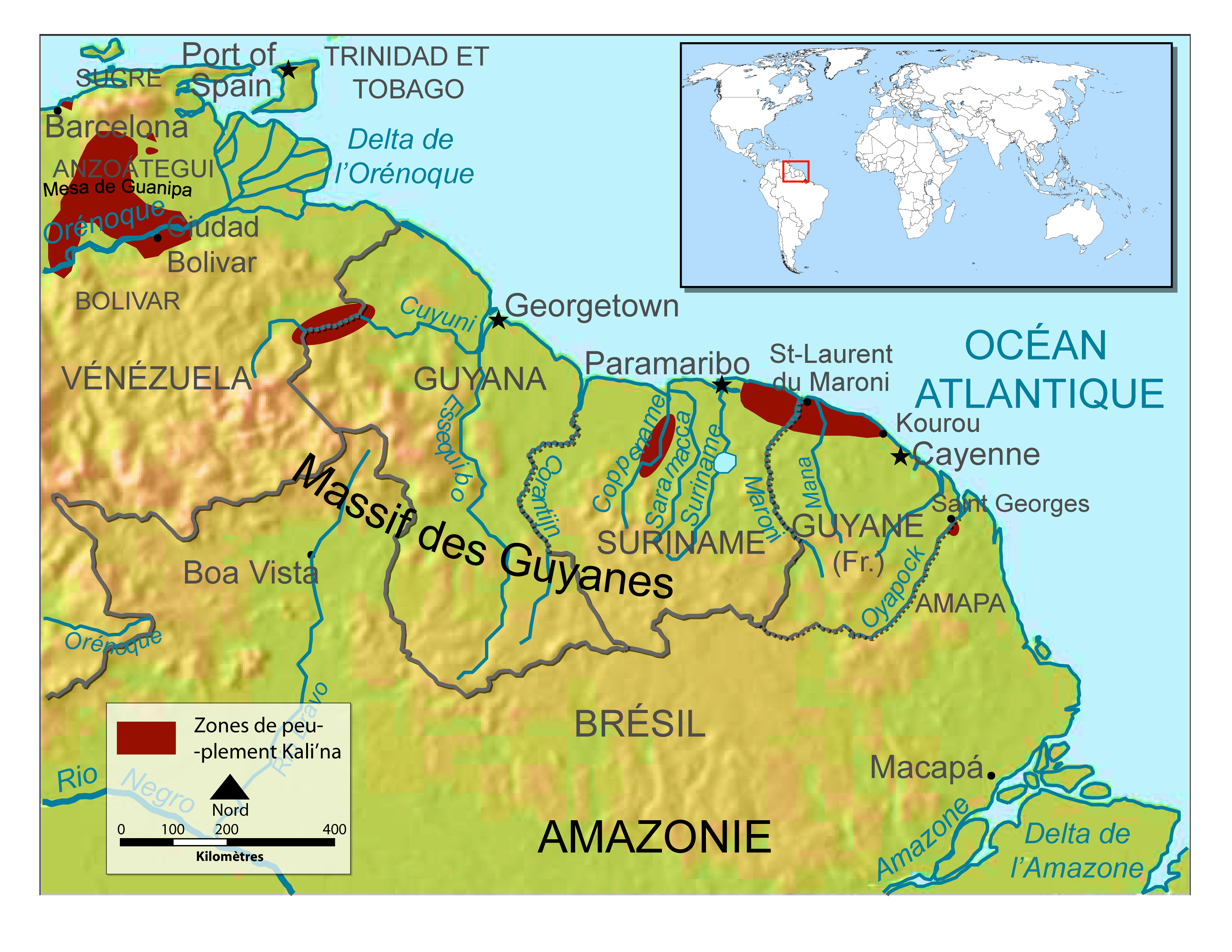
- Ethnic Kaliʼna populations

- Kariʼña is classified as Definitely Endangered by the UNESCO Atlas of the World's Languages in Danger
- Coordinates: 5°42′32.499″N 54°0′55.313″W

Kalina, also known as Kariʼna, Carib, and Galibi, is a Cariban language spoken by the Kalina people (Caribs) of South America. It is spoken by around 7,400 mostly in Brazil, the Guianas, and Venezuela. The language is currently classified as highly endangered, as it is only spoken by elders.

== Names ==
The language is known by several names to both its speakers and outsiders. Traditionally it has been known as "Carib" or "Carib proper" in English, after its speakers, being given the exonym "Caribs". The term Galibi, which originated as a pronunciation of Caribe, is also frequently used; for example Glottolog uses the name "Galibi Carib" for the Carib language, plus "Galibi-Marworno Creole French" for the variety of Karipúna Creole French as used by the Galibi Marworno, and "Galibi-based pidgin" for the family consisting of Joeka–Oajana pidgin and the extinct Pidgin Carib. The people are known as Galibí, Kalihna or Caribe in Portuguese, Caribe in Spanish, Galina in French, and Karaïeb in Dutch. However, the speakers call themselves Kalina or Karìna (variously spelled), and call their language Karìna auran [kaɽiɁnʲauɽaŋ]. Spelling variants include Kaliʼna, Kariʼnja, Cariña, Kariña, Kalihna, Kalinya; other native names include Maraworno and Marworno.

== Classification ==
Kariʼnja is classified as a Cariban language, in the Guianan Carib branch. Kariʼnja is considered "Carib proper" because it exemplifies the core genetic features of the family, such as its complex pronominal prefix system and ergative-absolutive alignment.

== Geographic distribution ==
Pidgin Carib
- Lengua generale
- Region: Oyapock
- Era: 17th – early 20th centuries
- Language family: Carib-based pidgin

Language codes
- ISO 639-3: None (mis)
- Glottolog: pidg1256
- ELP: Kari'nja

Due to contact with Kariʼnja invaders, some languages have Kariʼnja words incorporated into them, despite being Arawakan languages linguistically. A Carib-based lengua generale was once used in the old missions of the Oyapock and surrounding regions, apparently surviving at least along the Uaçá tributary into the 20th century.

In Suriname, there is a village called Konomerume which is located near the Wajambo River. With about 349 people living there, a majority identify as ethnically Kariʼnja and the adults are reported to at least have a decent knowledge of it. Those above the age of 65 use the language as a primary language among the members of the community. Speakers between the ages of 45 and 65 tend to use the language only when speaking with older residents or elder members of their family, while for the most part using the official languages: Dutch and Sranan Tongo. Younger adults between the ages of 20 and 40 for the most part understand the language but do not speak it, and children learn bits about Kariʼnja in school.

== Dialects ==
Carib dialects (with number of speakers indicated in parentheses):

- Venezuelan Carib (1000)
- Guyanese Carib (2000)
- Western Surinamese Carib (500)
- Eastern Surinamese and French Guianese Carib (3000)
  - Suriname has two dialects of Kariʼnja: Aretyry which is spoken in the west and central parts of the country, and Tyrewuju which is what the majority of Kariʼnja speakers in Suriname use.

== Phonology ==
In the Kariʼnja language, there are four syllable patterns: V, CV, VC, CVC; C standing for consonants while V means a vowel. Regarding phonemes, consonants are divided into two groups: obstruents (voiceless stops—p, t, k) and resonants (voiced stops—b, d, g, s).

Kariʼnja has a typical six-vowel system after *ô merged with *o, being a e i o u ï. Compared to past Kariʼnja, modern-day Kariʼnja has replaced the e in many words with o.

Consonants
		Bilabial	Dental	Alveolar	Palatal	Velar	Glottal
Nasal		m	n				
Plosive	voiceless	p	t			k	ʔ ~ h
Plosive	voiced	b	d			ɡ	ʔ ~ h
Fricative				s			ʔ ~ h
Tap/Flap				ɾ			
Semivowel		w			j		

Vowels
	Front	Central	Back
Close	i	ɨ	u
Mid	e		o
Open		a	

Allophones for /r w t/ include sounds as [ɽ β,v tʃ]. /s/ before /i/ may be pronounced as [ʃ]. /n/ before a consonant may be pronounced as [ŋ] and also [ɲ] elsewhere. Another sound, ranging [h~x], often occurs before a voiced or voiceless consonant, and succeeding a vowel, it can also be an allophone of /ʔ/.

== Alphabet ==
The Carib alphabet consists of 18 letters:

a, b, d, e, g, i, j, k, ʼ, m, n, o, p, r, s, t, u, w, y.

B, d, g are found after nasals for phonemic /p t k/.

== Grammar ==
There are 17 particles within Kariʼnja which include the ky- prefix and the -ng suffix.

== Vocabulary ==
All four dialects of Kariʼnja have loan words from the primary language of the area (Brazil, Suriname, Guyana, French Guiana). For example, the Kariʼnja spoken in Suriname borrows words from Dutch and Sranantongo.

=== Examples ===
English	Modern Kariʼnja
'two'	[oko]
'stone'	[topu]
'flea'	[siko]
'mountain'	[wipi]
'axe'	[wïwï]
'person'	[itoto]
'one that has been dug'	[Ø-atoka-apo]
'one that has burnt'	[i-tjoroty-ypo]
'peccary/javelina'	[pakira]

Some of the words show instances in which the e has been replaced with o in present-day Kariʼnja. The two statements beneath the singular words show examples of two suffixes.
