= São José dos Galibi =

Indigenous village in Oiapoque, Brazil

- Location in Brazil São José dos Galibi (Brazil)
- Coordinates: 3.99847°N 51.72623°W
- Country: Brazil
- Region: North
- State: Amapá
- Municipality: Oiapoque

Population (2016)
  - Total: 74
- Time zone: UTC−3 (BRT)

São José dos Galibi is an Amerindian village of the Galibi do Oiapoque people in the Brazilian municipality of Oiapoque, Amapá. It is the only village of the tribe. São José dos Galibi is located on the Oiapoque River in the Galibi Indigenous Territory.

== Overview ==
The people used to live in Mana in French Guiana. In 1948, a group of 38 people asked permission of the Indian Protection Service to settle in Brazil after an internal conflict within the tribe. They self identify as Galibi do Oiapoque to distinguish themselves from the Galibi Marworno who live land inwards.

In 1982, they were awarded the Galibi Indigenous Territory which measures 6,365 hectares (15,730 acres), and which is shared with the Karipuna do Amapá who live in Ariramba. In 2016, São José dos Galibi was home to 74 people, however only 33 are Galibi do Oiapoque.

The village has a school, a health post, and a post of the FUNAI, the governmental agency for Amerindian affairs. The main language of the younger generation is Portuguese. The Galibi do Oiapoque have a good relationship with the neighbouring tribes, however there is limited contact.
