= Kalina people =

Indigenous people native to the northern coastal areas of South America

Kalina
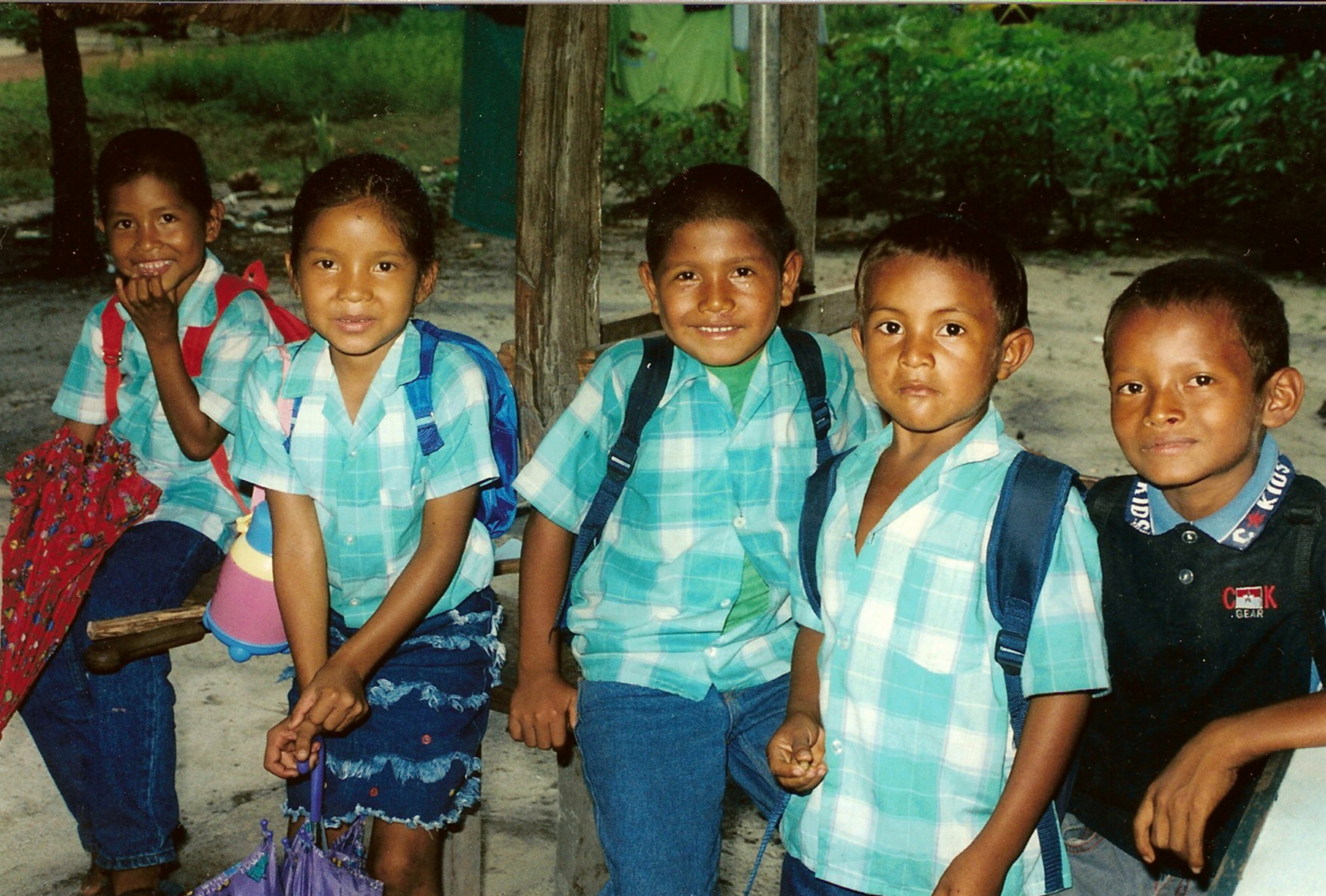
- Kalina schoolchildren from Bigi Poika, Suriname, 2002.

Total population
- 44,741

Regions with significant populations
- Venezuela: 33,824 (2011)
- Suriname: 3,000 (2002)
- Guyana: 3,100 (2020)
- French Guiana: 3,000 (2002)
- Brazil: 1,817

Languages
- Carib; Various local languages

Religion
- Christianity, Native American religions

Related ethnic groups
- Island Caribs
- Also known as Kaliʼna, Karina, Kariña, Kaliña, Kalihna, Kalinya.

The Kalina (Caliña), also known as the Caribs or mainland Caribs and by several other names, are an Indigenous people native to the northern coastal areas of South America. The Kalina live largely in villages on the rivers and coasts of Venezuela, Guyana, Suriname, French Guiana, and Brazil. They speak a Cariban language known as Carib. They may be related to the Kalinago of the Caribbean, though their languages are unrelated.

== Name ==
The exonym Caribe was first recorded by Christopher Columbus. One hypothesis for the origin of Carib is that it means "brave warrior". However, this is considered a folk etymology, and the name is more likely based on a different (but perhaps related) people's endonym in another Cariban language meaning "person" and deriving from Proto-Cariban *karipona, possibly via a Caribbean Arawakan intermediary such as the Kalinago ("Island Carib" or Iñeri) word karifuna (which is also the source of the exonym of the Garifuna; compare also Carijona, Karipúna, and similar names), though the source language is uncertain. Its variants, including the English Carib, were then adopted by other European languages. Early Spanish colonizers used the terms Arawak and Caribs to distinguish the peoples of the Caribbean, with Carib reserved for Indigenous groups that they considered hostile and Arawak for groups that they considered friendly. The name Galibi, originating as a form of the word Caribe, has also been used since at least the 19th century and is still common in Portuguese and Spanish, possibly making a resurgence in recent times as an autonym used by some Kalina groups and closely related populations, some of whom are of mixed origin and speak a creole language. This is also the source of the place names São José dos Galibi, Santa Maria dos Galibis and the part of Suriname called Galibi. Different Galibi groups are further differentiated based on geography, such as by which river they live near (more information below).

The Kalina call themselves Kalina or Karìna (approximately [kaɽiɁɲa] in IPA), spelled variously. Variants include Kaliʼna, Cariña, Kariña, Kalihna, Kalinya. In their native language (Karìna auran), it literally means "person". Other native names include Maraworno or Marworno, in particular for the Galibi Marworno. Kalina may distinguish themselves as Kaliʼna tilewuyu ("true Kalina"), partly to differentiate themselves from the mixed Maroon-Kalina inhabitants of Suriname. Use of "Kalina" and related variants has become common practice only recently in publications; many sources continue to use "Caribs" or associated names.

== History ==
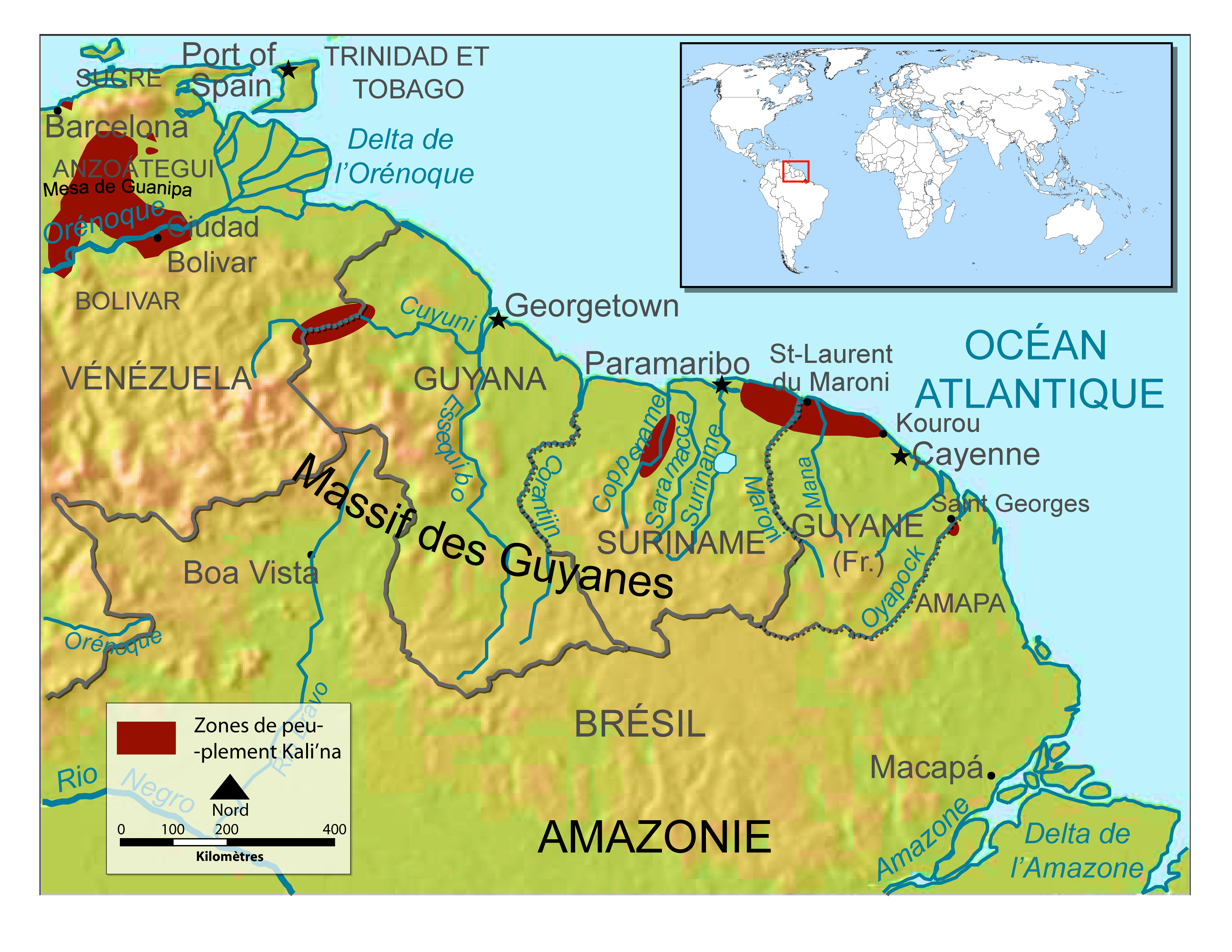
Map indicating the geographic distribution of the Kaliʼna population

Lacking a written form of language before the arrival of Europeans, Kaliʼna history was passed down orally from one generation to the next through tales of myth and legend.

For a long time, the few Europeans studying the history of the Amerindian people of this area did not distinguish between the various Caribbean tribes. Once the period of exploration was over, interest in the study of these people diminished greatly and did not re-emerge until the end of the 20th century, when a few French expatriates, such as Gérard Collomb, became interested in the Kaliʼna, and the Kaliʼna themselves began to relate their history, in particular Félix Tiouka, president of the Association of Amerindians of French Guiana (AAGF), and his son Alexis.

For these reasons, historical information regarding the Kaliʼna is rare and incomplete.

=== Pre-Columbian era ===
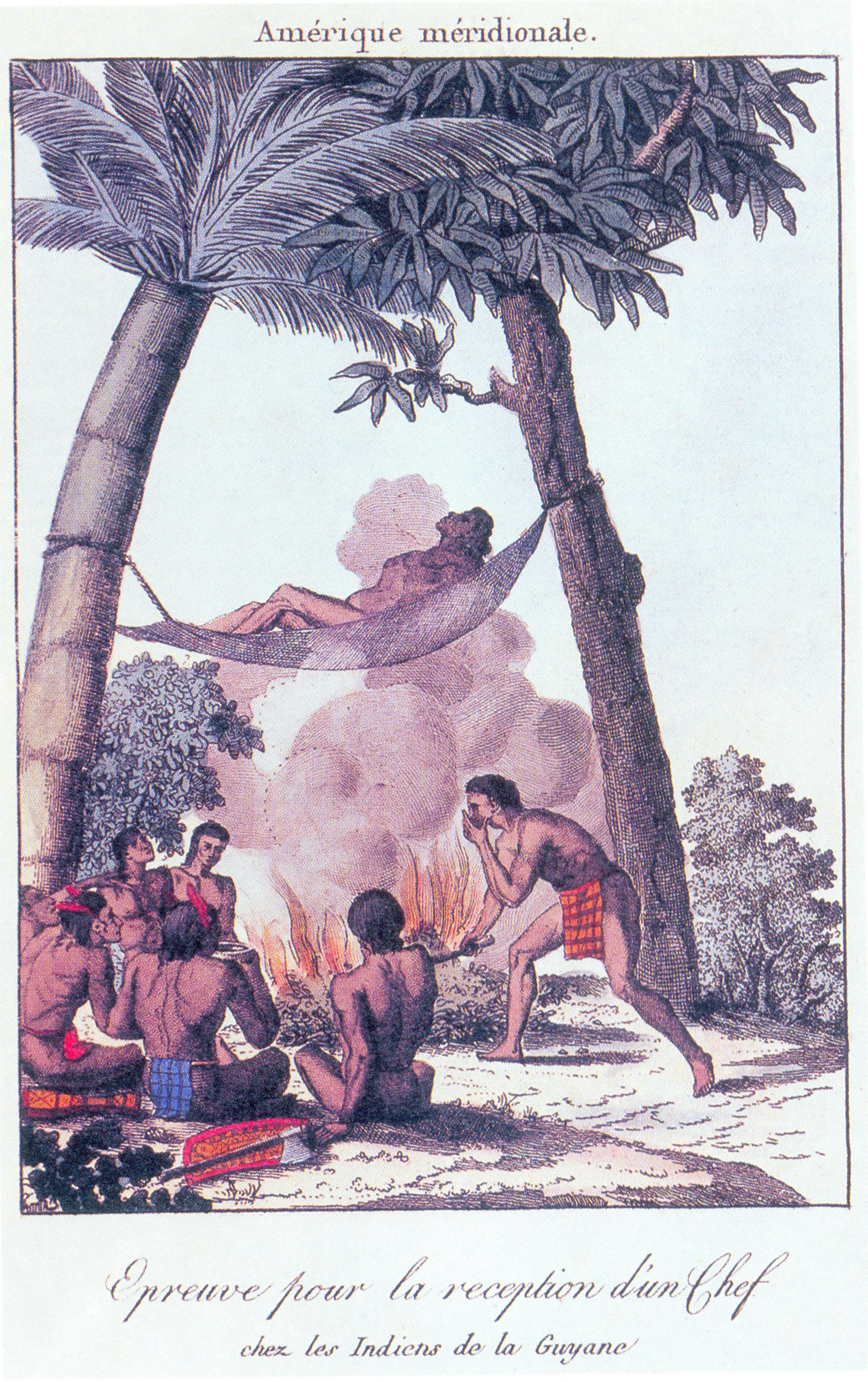
Drawing of a Kaliʼna ritual.

Making up for lack of written records, archaeologists have as of 1998 uncovered 273 Amerindian archeological sites on only 310 km^{2} of the land recovered from the Sinnamary River by the Petit-Saut Dam. Some date back as far as two thousand years, establishing the antiquity of the Amerindian presence in this area.^{,}

The weak historical clues available indicate that before 1492, the Kaliʼna inhabited the coast (from the mouth of the Amazon River to that of the Orinoco), dividing their territory with the Arawak, against whom they fought during their expansion toward the east and the Amazon River.^{,}

They were prolific travelers even though they weren't nomads. They often traveled by land and by sea as far as the area around the Orinoco river to visit family, trade, and marry. They often went to the area surrounding the Essequibo river (now in Guyana) to collect pebbles of red porphyry (takuwa), which Kaliʼna women prized for polishing their pottery. The term takuwa also refers to jade, which was often traded in the Americas in general.

=== Colonization ===
==== The Palanakiłi arrive ====
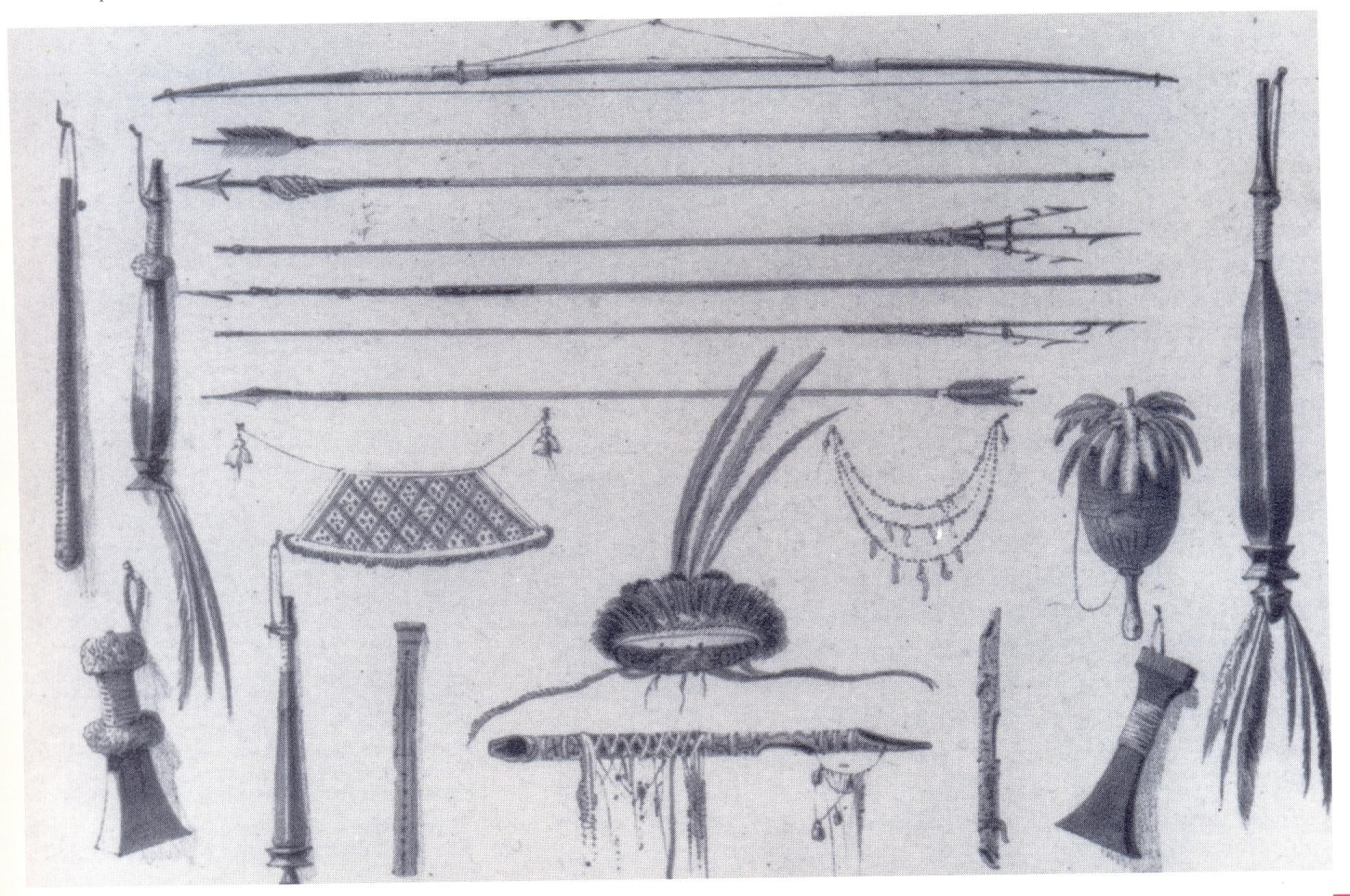
Kaliʼna weapons and tools.

In their first contact with Europeans, the Kaliʼna thought they were dealing with the spirits of the sea, Palanakiłi, a name they have used since when referring to whites.

One of the first consequences of the arrival of Europeans, as in the case of many other Native American peoples, was a decrease in population due to violence inflicted by European soldiers genocide, and diseases brought over by the Europeans. The Kaliʼna succumbed in large numbers, because their immune systems were not adapted to the viruses and bacteria of the Old World.

At that time, the Kaliʼna knew only stone axes and hardwood machetes. These men brought with them axes and machetes of iron, they showed that they cut much better ... This time, the Palanakiłi had brought good things.

==== Amerindians in Paris ====
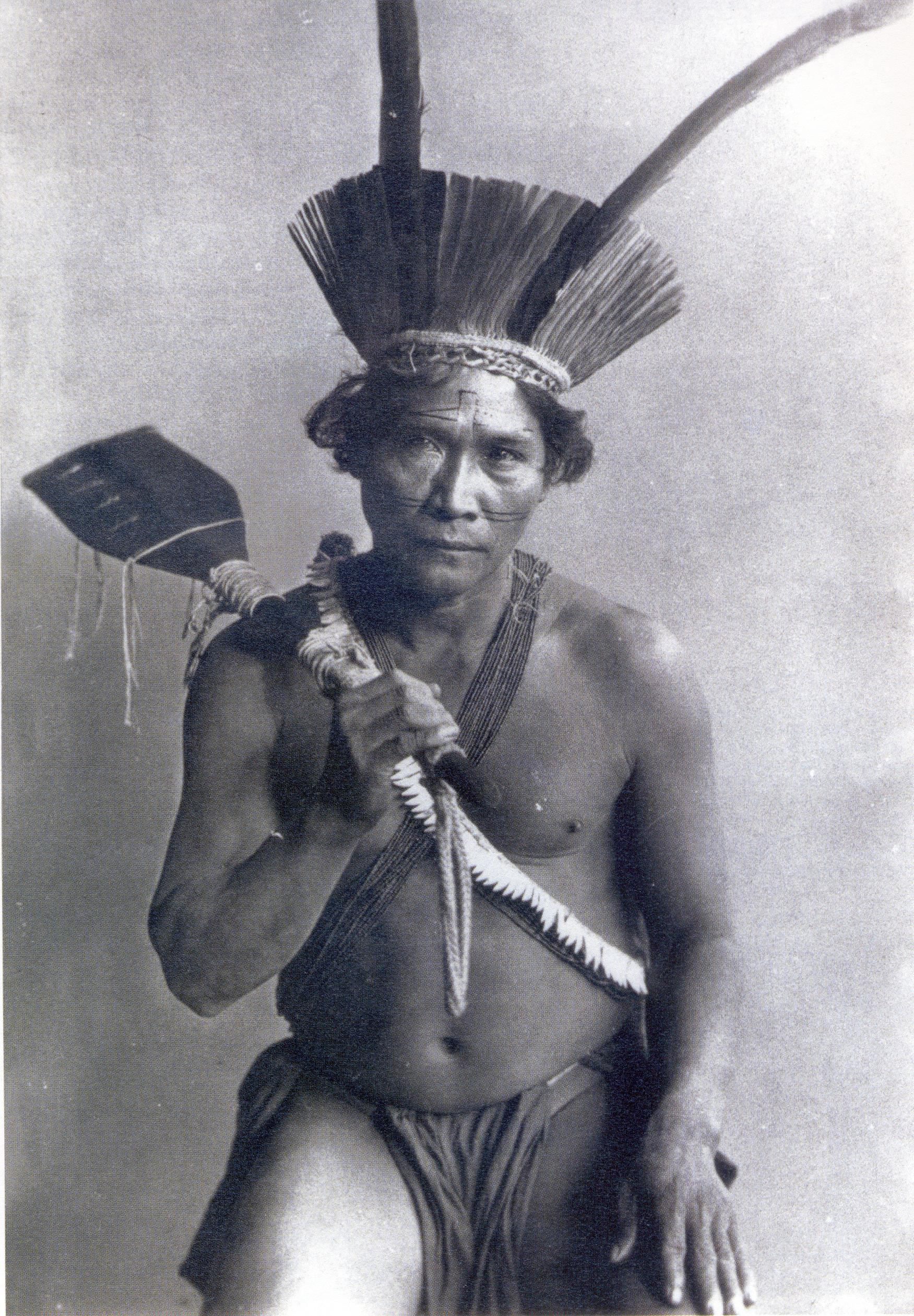
Kaliʼna man in Paris in 1892 holding a putu, or wooden club.

The second half of the nineteenth century saw the heyday of World's Fairs, in which European countries were displaying their wealth with colonial "villages" representing the colonized cultures. Although the World's Fairs of Paris did not have "Amerindian villages", public curiosity was such that Kaliʼna were sent to the capital twice - once in 1882 and again in 1892 - to be exhibited as oddities at the Jardin d'Acclimatation.^{,}

===== 1882 =====
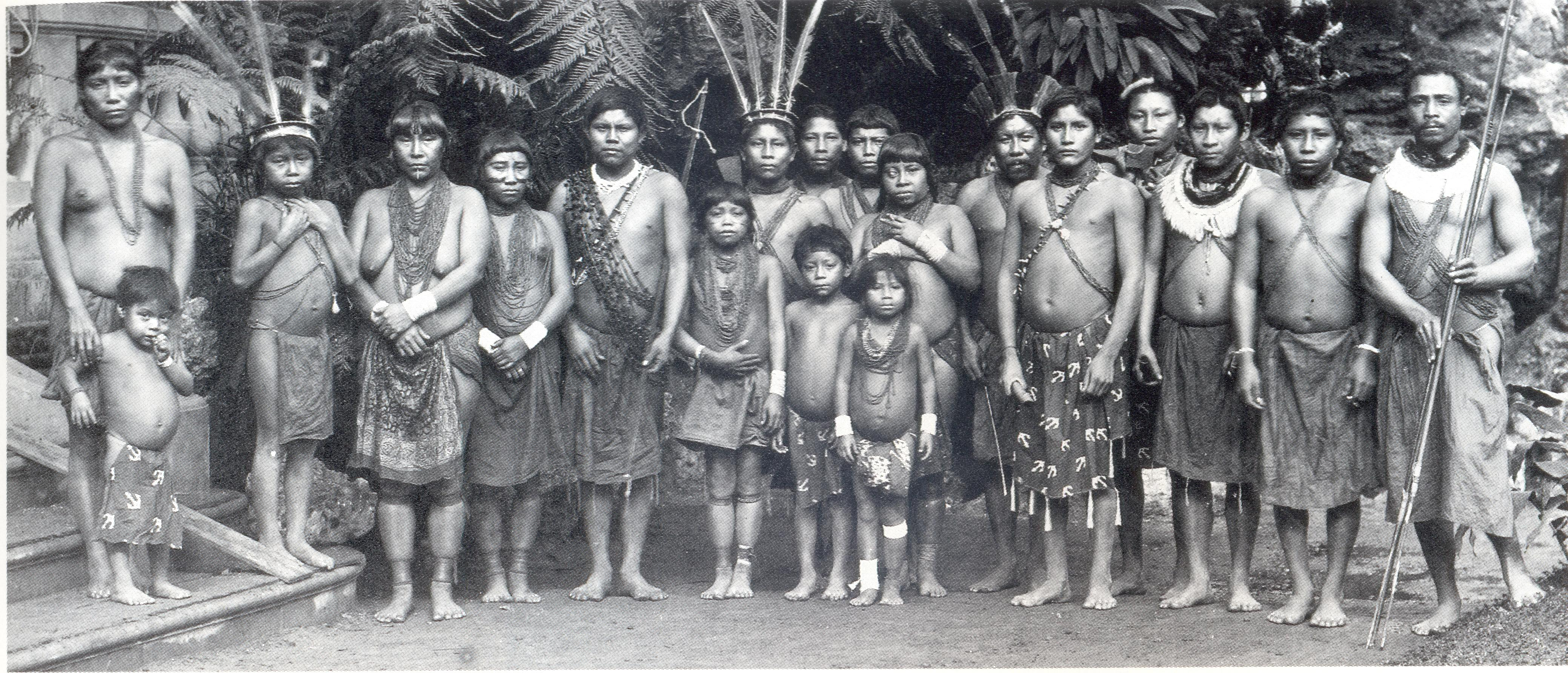
Portrait of the Kaliʼna exhibited at the Jardin d’Acclimatation in Paris in 1892.

Fifteen Kali’na, all members of one family living in Sinnamary and Iracoubo, were sent to Pau:wa ("The Land of the Whites") in July 1882. Almost nothing is known about them, except their names and that they were housed in huts on the lawn of the Jardin d'Acclimatation. The trip lasted four months, including three in Paris and a month's journey by boat (round trip). They were accompanied by a Creole who acted as intermediary and, presumably, interpreter. There are several portraits of them, taken by photographer Pierre Petit.

== The Modern Kaliʼna ==
The part of South America where the Kaliʼna live is very sparsely populated. However, the people of this ethnic group are such an extreme minority in all of the countries in which they are well established that locally they are a majority only in certain very secluded areas. Their geographic distribution covers only a small fraction of their Pre-Columbian territory.

=== Brazil ===
The Kaliʼnas in Brazil are localized in two groups. The Galibi do Oiapoque can only be found in São José dos Galibi, a village founded in 1950 on the right bank of the Oyapock River by several families who came from the region of the Mana River. The Galibi Marworno or Uaçá Galibi mainly live along the Uaçá River further land inwards. The main settlement is Kumarumã. The Galibi Marworno were originally from French Guiana, but mixed with the Aruã and Marworno Amerindians. The term Galibi Marworno is a recent self-designation of the group.

=== French Guiana ===
Still present in significant numbers in their original territory, the region between the Maroni and the Mana rivers (in particular, the communities of Awala-Yalimapo, the only one where they are a majority, Saint-Laurent-du-Maroni, Mana and Iracoubo), and the Amerindian village of Kourou as well as, in fewer numbers, the island of Cayenne.

=== Suriname ===
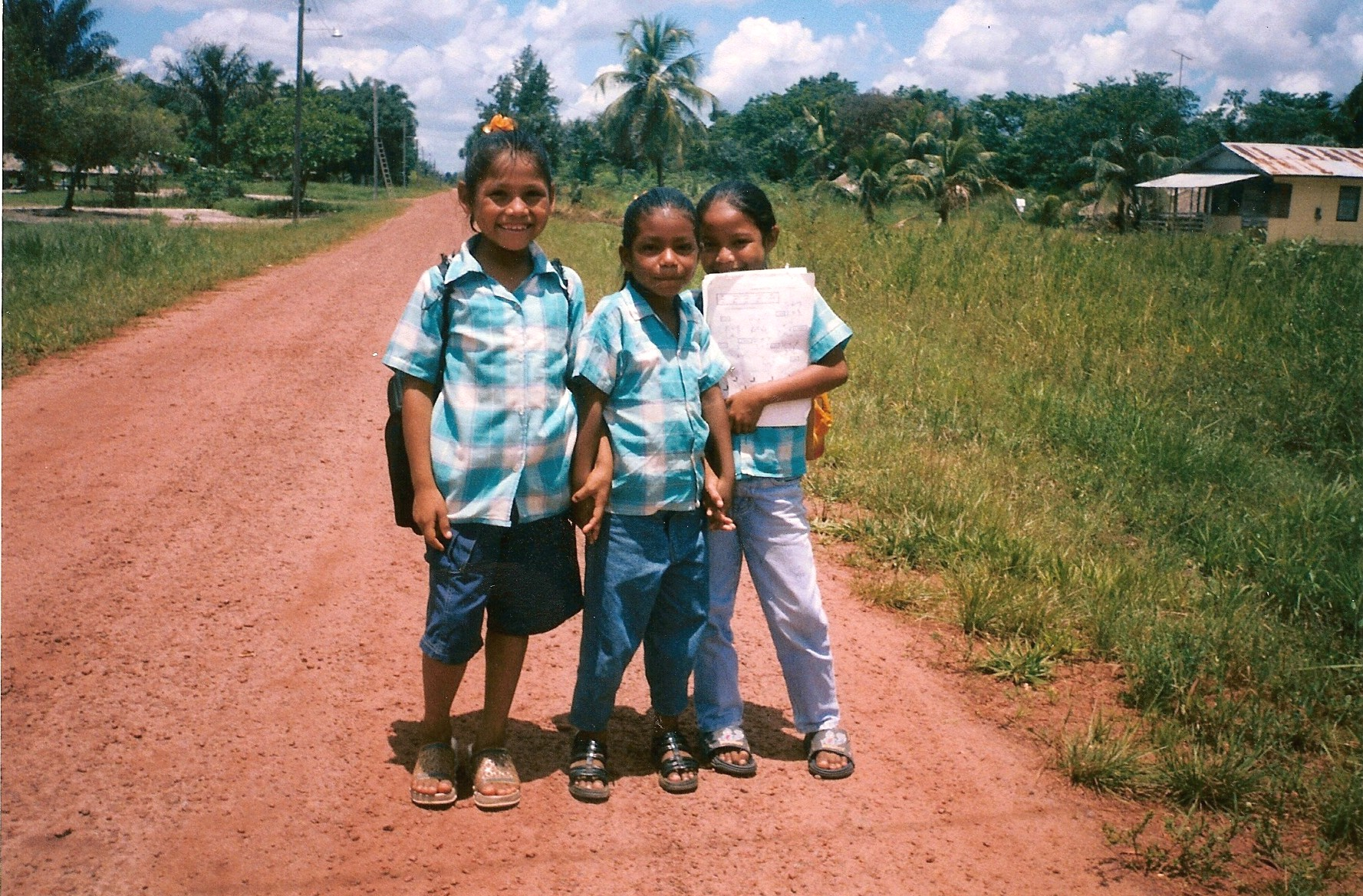
Kaliʼna girls in Suriname in the village of Bigi Poika.

Kaliʼna are a strong presence on the left bank of the Maroni River and on the banks of the Coppename River. A large proportion of the population lives in the Para District often in villages shared with the Lokono people. The main settlements are Bernharddorp, Wit-Santi, Galibi, Powakka and Bigi Ston. The Kaliʼna lived in the same area as the colonizers, and have a peace treaty with Suriname since 1686. A Kaliʼna member of the National Assembly, Sylvia Kajoeramari, successfully led efforts to recognize the International Day of the World's Indigenous Peoples as a public holiday in Suriname.

=== Guyana ===
In Guyana, Kaliʼna are stereotyped as the most "proud, aggressive, and warlike" of the Amerindian groups. Kalina were paid by plantation owners to capture indigenous slaves as well as recapture African slaves who escaped. One of the smaller indigenous groups in Guyana, Kaliʼna are settled on the Barama and Pomeroon Rivers, and in the Northwest of the country.

Malaria has had a detrimental impact on the population of Kalina in Guyana, and is exacerbated by hinterland mining that creates still-water pools that serve as vectors for the disease. Many Kalina are also employed in the mining sector.

=== Venezuela ===
The country where their numbers are the greatest, Kaliʼna can be found in two distinct zones: in the Llanos of the Orinoco river valley and on the Cuyuni River valley part of which is in Guyana. See also Chimire, Venezuela.

== Culture ==
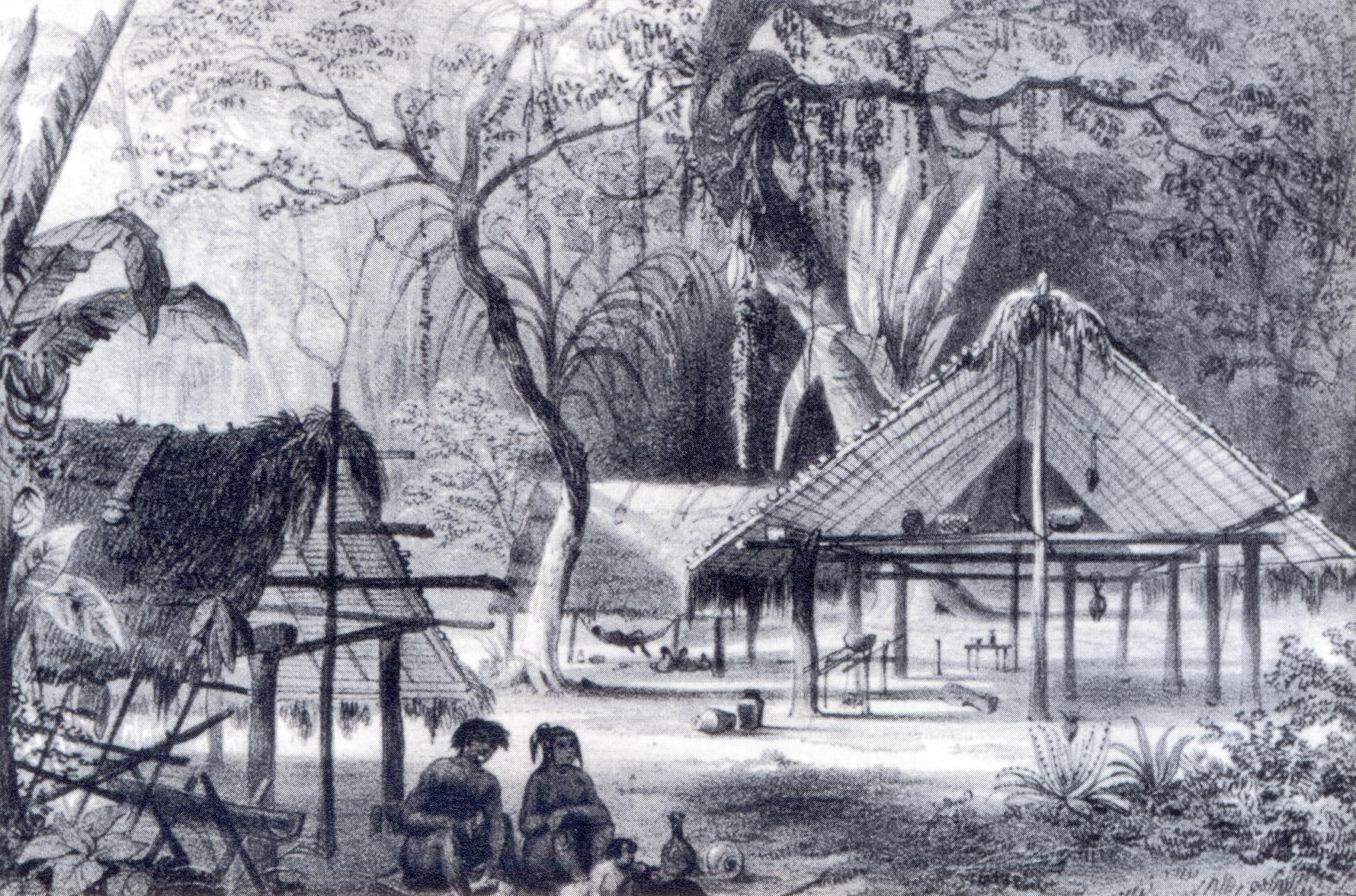
Kaliʼna village.

Kasiri, a cassava-derived beer, is an important part of traditional Kalina celebrations.

For Kalina of the Guianas, the death of family members initiates a period of mourning that can last for a year or more, concluded with a celebration known as Epekotono. Preparations are made by a respected member of the village, and can take several months. Collecting money is a more contemporary addition to the responsibilities. Epekotono is a public event that draws attendance from neighboring villages, including body-painting, music, dancing, and symbolic burning of the deceased's belongings to mark their spirit leaving. At the conclusion, mourning ends and normal social behaviors resume, along with the option for widows to remarry. While non-Kalina can attend as guests, the event serves to reinforce the Kalina identity, marked by explicit use of the Kalina language. The epekotono is the only occasion for such gatherings among the modern Kalina.

=== Music ===
Mostly percussion instruments are used. The sanpula (or sambula) is a large drum with two skins stretched over either end of the shell by hoops pulled together with cord and is played with a mallet. They also have two kinds of maracas, called a kalawasi (or kalawashi) and a malaka.

Their flute, the kuwama, is still made but is more and more often replaced by the European flute. There is also a terra cotta horn called a kuti.

=== Language ===
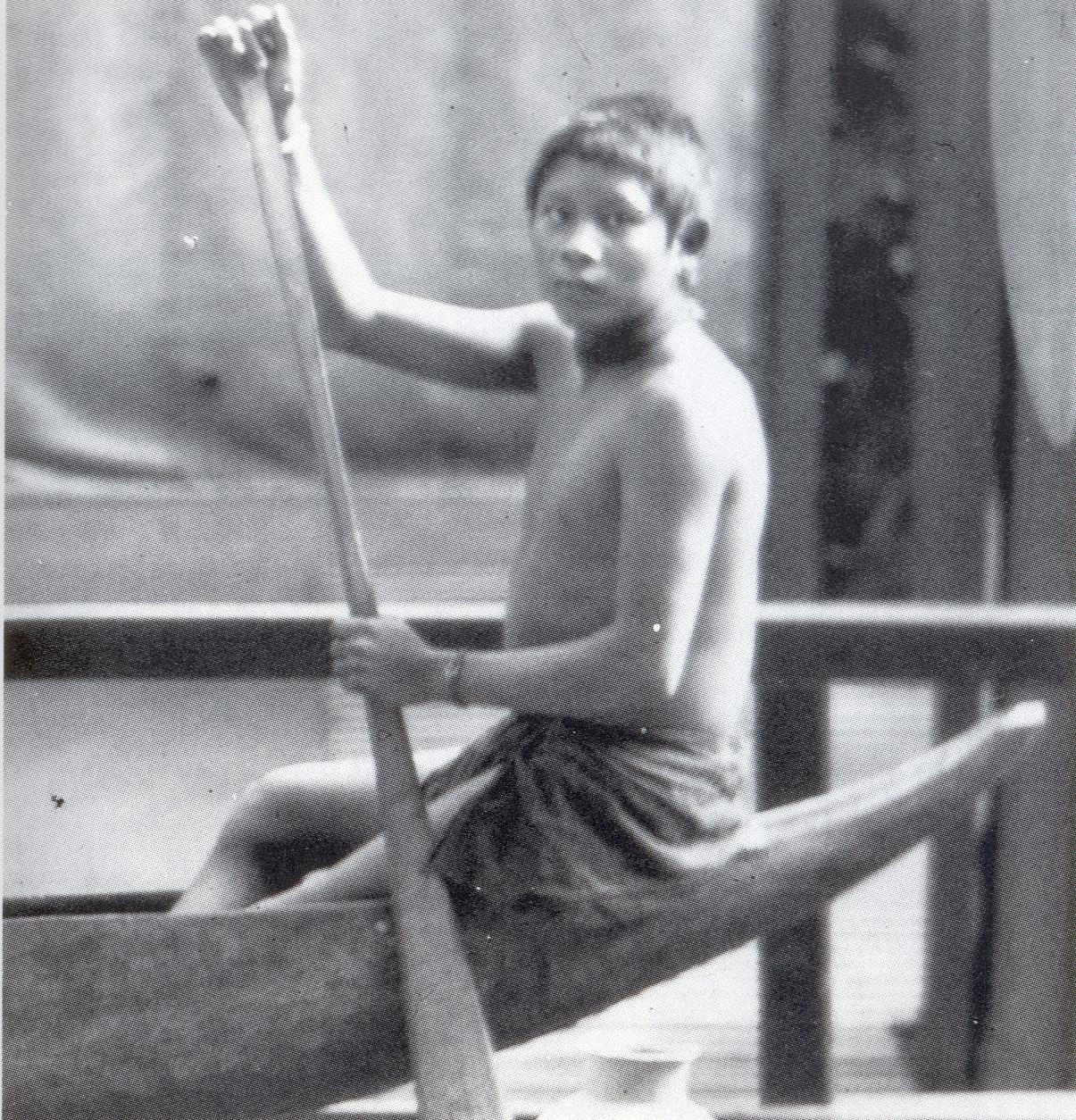
Kaliʼna boy in a dugout in Paris in 1892.

The Kaliʼna language belonging to the family of Cariban languages, is still spoken by above 10,000 people in the coastal strip that stretches from Venezuela (5,000 speakers) to Brazil (100) passing through Guyana (475), Suriname (2,500) and French Guiana (3,000 people).

Thanks to the number of speakers, it is one of the most likely Amazonian tongues to survive. Some experiments with written transcription were undertaken in French Guiana. Linguistic standardization of a Kaliʼna writing system however is plagued by the diversity of many different forms of the written language in use, which have been influenced by the languages of the colonists of the countries in which the Kaliʼna live, Spanish, Portuguese, Dutch, French and English. Thus, even as far as their ethnonym is concerned, Kaliʼna, there are no fewer than nine different writing systems. Kaliʼna therefore remains a primarily oral language.

== Notable people ==
- Sylvia Kajoeramari, Surinamese politician
- Clara Vidal (born 1983), Venezuelan politician

== See also ==
- Adaheli, the Sun in the mythology of the Orinoco region
- Classification of Indigenous peoples of the Americas
