= Sylvia Kajoeramari =

Surinamese politician

Member of the National Assembly
- In office 2005–2010
- Constituency: Marowijne District

Personal details
- Born: Galibi, Marowijne, Suriname
- Party: Pertjajah Luhur
- Other political affiliations: General Liberation and Development Party (since 2014)

Sylvia Kajoeramari is a Surinamese politician. She was a member of the National Assembly from 2005 to 2010, representing Marowijne District for the Pertjajah Luhur (PL) party.

== Biography ==
Kajoeramari is from the village of Galibi in Marowijne District. She is of Kalina origin.

During the 2005 elections, Kajoeramari was a candidate of the Pertjajah Luhur (PL) party, which was then part of the New Front alliance. She won a seat in the National Assembly for the 2005-2010 term. She advocated to establish the International Day of the World's Indigenous Peoples (proposed by the United Nations in 1994) as an official Surinamese public holiday. President Ronald Venetiaan declared its observance in 2006.

Her brother Ramses Kajoeramari, a former village chief, was also elected to the National Assembly (2010-2015). In 2014, she switched from the PL to the General Liberation and Development Party (ABOP).
