= Galibi, Suriname =

Galibi
- Resort
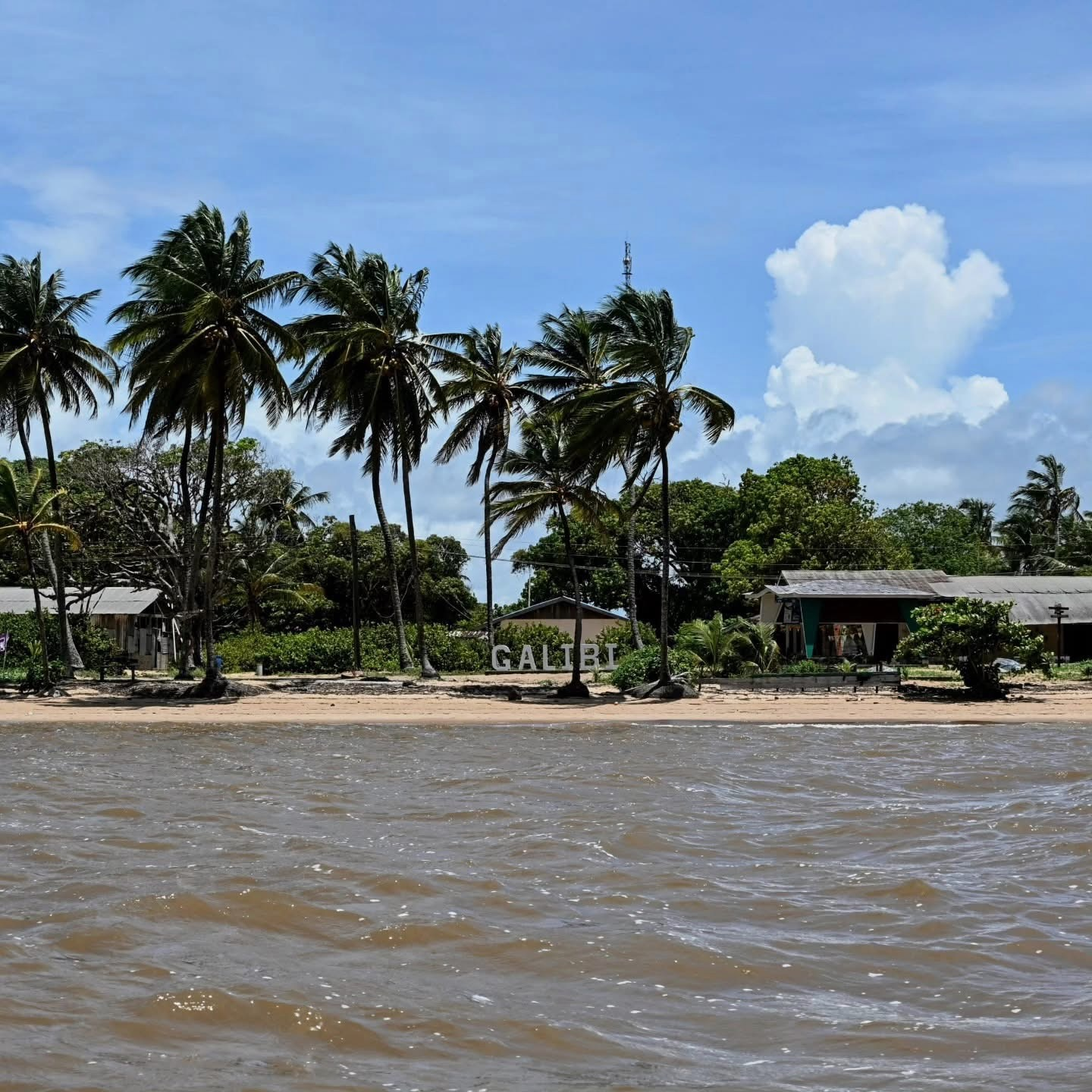
- View of Galibi beach

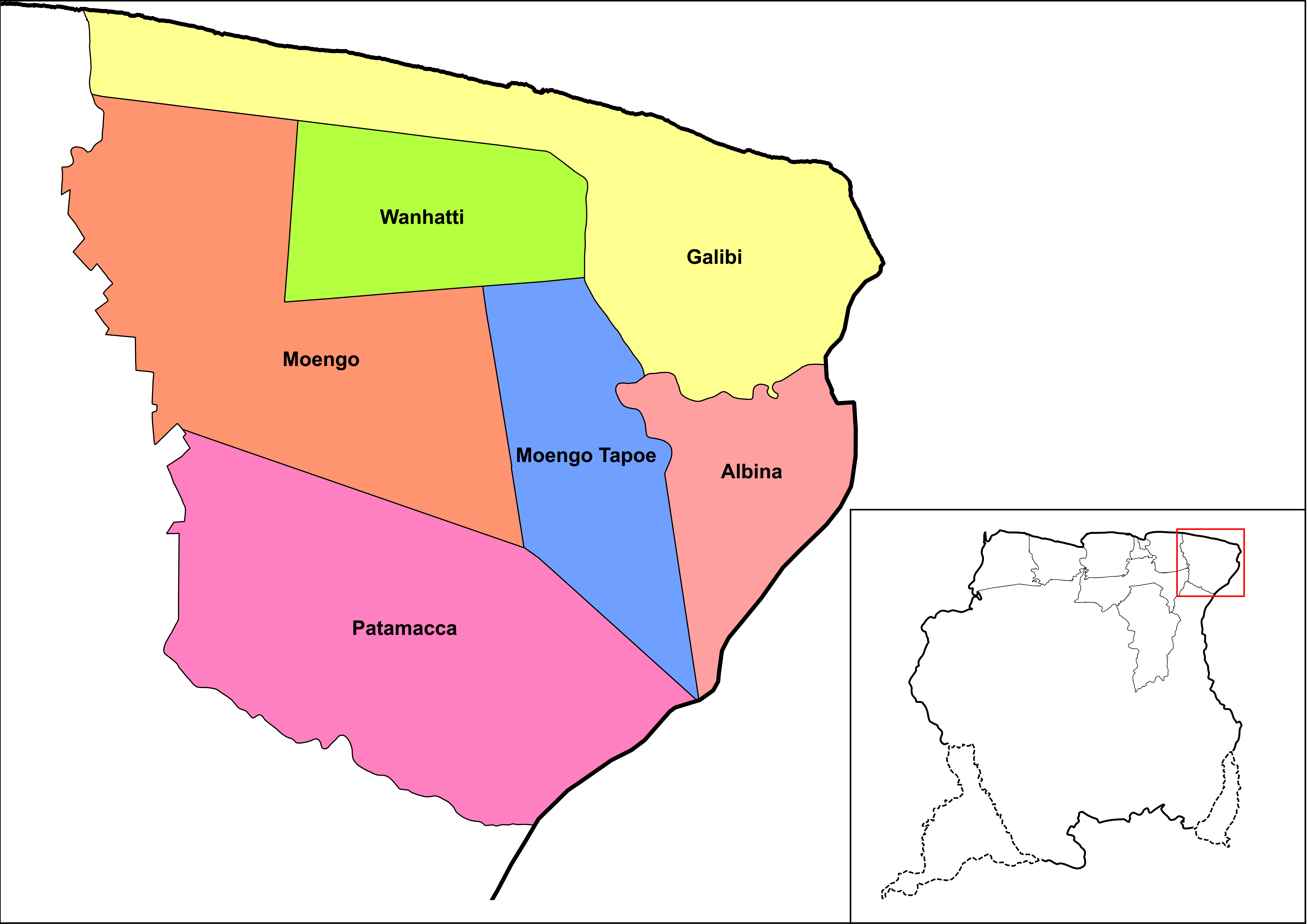
- Map showing the resorts of Marowijne District. Galibi
- Coordinates: 5.6978°N 54.0277°W
- Country: Suriname
- District: Marowijne District

Area
  - Total: 1,014 km^{2} (392 sq mi)
- Elevation: 0 m (0 ft)

Population (2012)
  - Total: 741
  - Density: 0.731/km^{2} (1.89/sq mi)
- Time zone: UTC-3 (AST)

Galibi is a resort in Suriname, located in the Marowijne District. Its population at the 2012 census was 741. Galibi is a tribal area inhabited by an Indigenous population of Kalina Amerindians.

The town of Alusiaka used to be located near the banks of the Marowijne River. The Dutch West India Company was given 500 hectares to grow coconuts; but, because of their mistreatment of the workers, the town was abandoned. In 1871 a 60-metre lighthouse was built near the entrance of the Marowijne; it was operated until 2012.

== Christiaankondre ==
The village of Christiaankondre is located along the estuary of the Marowijne River. Together with neighbouring Langamankondre, it is often referred to as Galibi. The village has been named after Christiaan Pané whose father founded the village in the late 17th century. The economy is based on fishing, subsistence farming, and tourism. The village has a school, a clinic, and a little zoo. Corneliskondre is the larger of the two settlements. The village chief as of 2020 is Richardo Pané.

== Langamankondre ==
Langamankondre is located next to Christiaankondre. The name is a mix of Dutch and Sranan Tongo and means "Long man's village" because the chief was very tall. In 2016, Selowin Alamijawari was elected village chief.

== Galibi Nature Reserve ==
The main attraction is the Galibi Nature Reserve. There is a beach at the mouth of the Marowijne River on the Atlantic Ocean. This section also has a small zoo and tourist shop. Tourists come to Galibi largely to see the Leatherback sea turtle. Its females migrate here from all over the world (including places as distant as Costa Rica, to lay their eggs in Suriname. Almost half of the known population of leatherback turtles, lay their eggs in this area.

Other turtles that frequent the beach are the Green sea turtle, the Olive ridley sea turtle, and the Hawksbill sea turtle The area can only visited under strict supervision between February and June.

== Wia Wia Nature Reserve ==
Founded in 1961, the Wia Wia Nature Reserve is located to the west of the Galibi Nature Reserve. It was also intended for the protection of the turtles; however, the focus has shifted to bird species, because the beach has shifted to the west. The Wia Wia Nature Reserve spans an area of 36,000 hectares.

== Transport ==
Galibi has a small boat (korjaal) connection to Albina. The journey across the water takes about 1.5 hrs, and boats land near the villages of Christiaankondre and Langamankondre. There is a road connection to some parts of the resort Galibi, but not to the two main villages near the nature reserve. The residents believed that a road would have disturbed their peace and quiet.

== Notable people ==
- Sylvia Kajoeramari, politician.

== Sister cities ==
- Koksijde, Belgium.

== Gallery ==
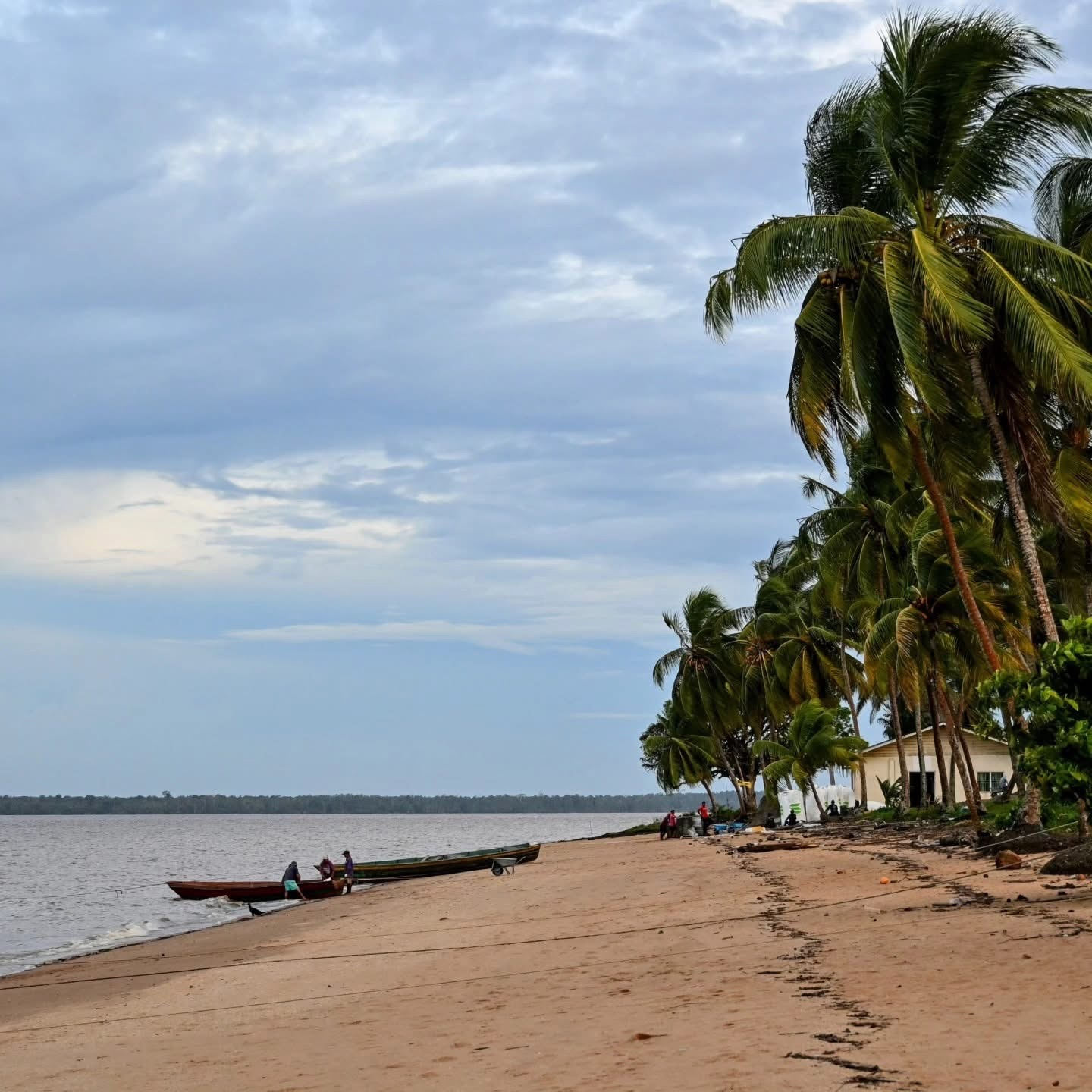

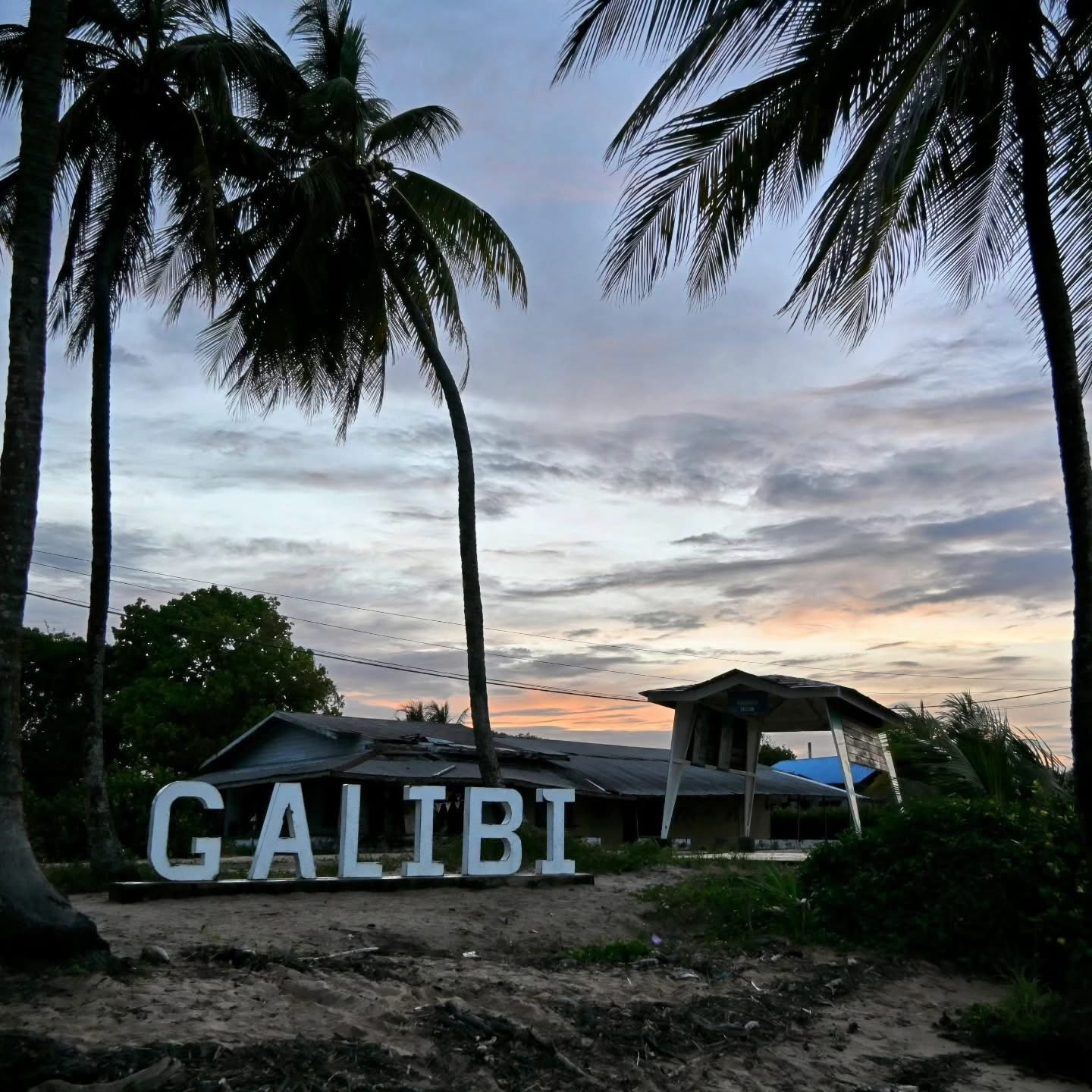

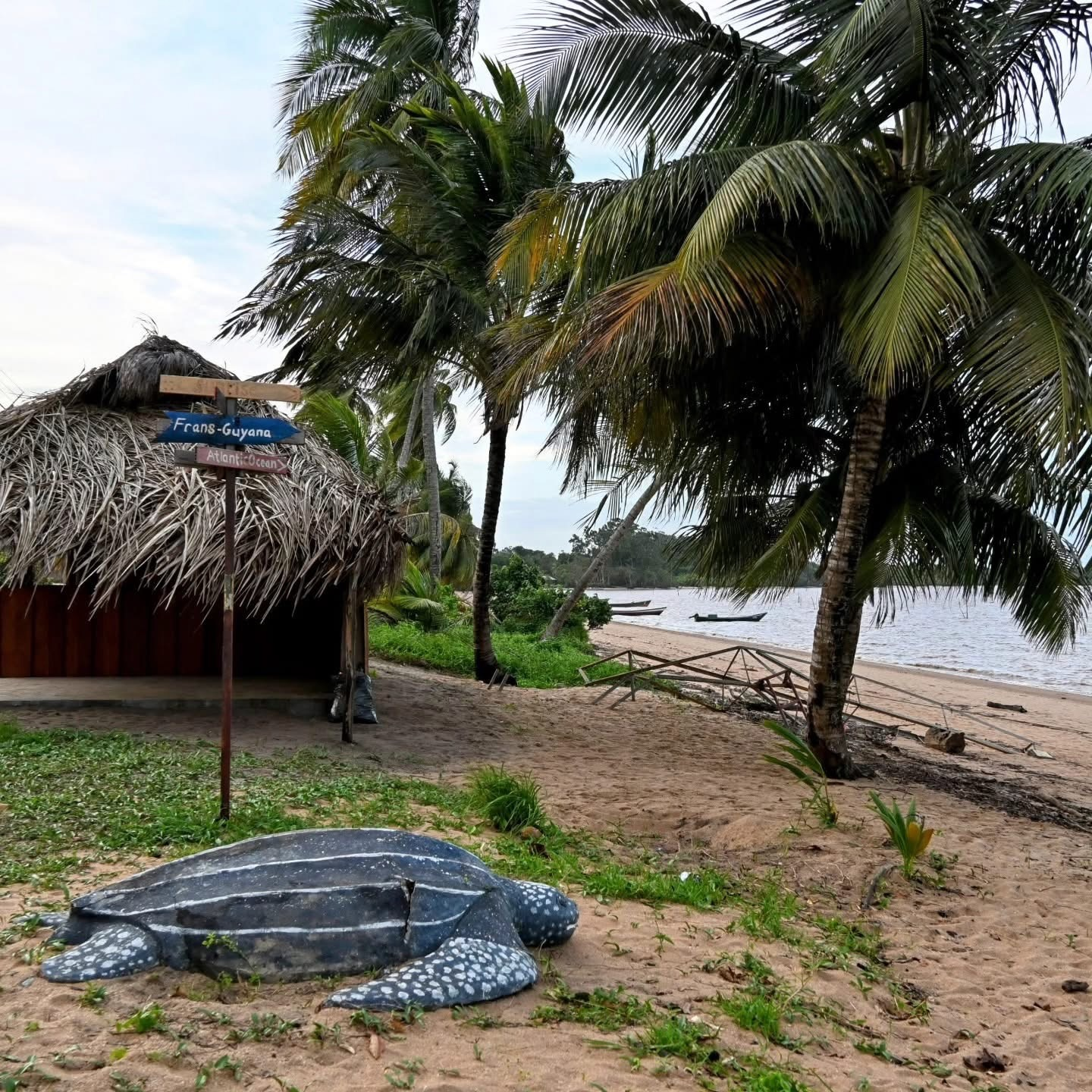

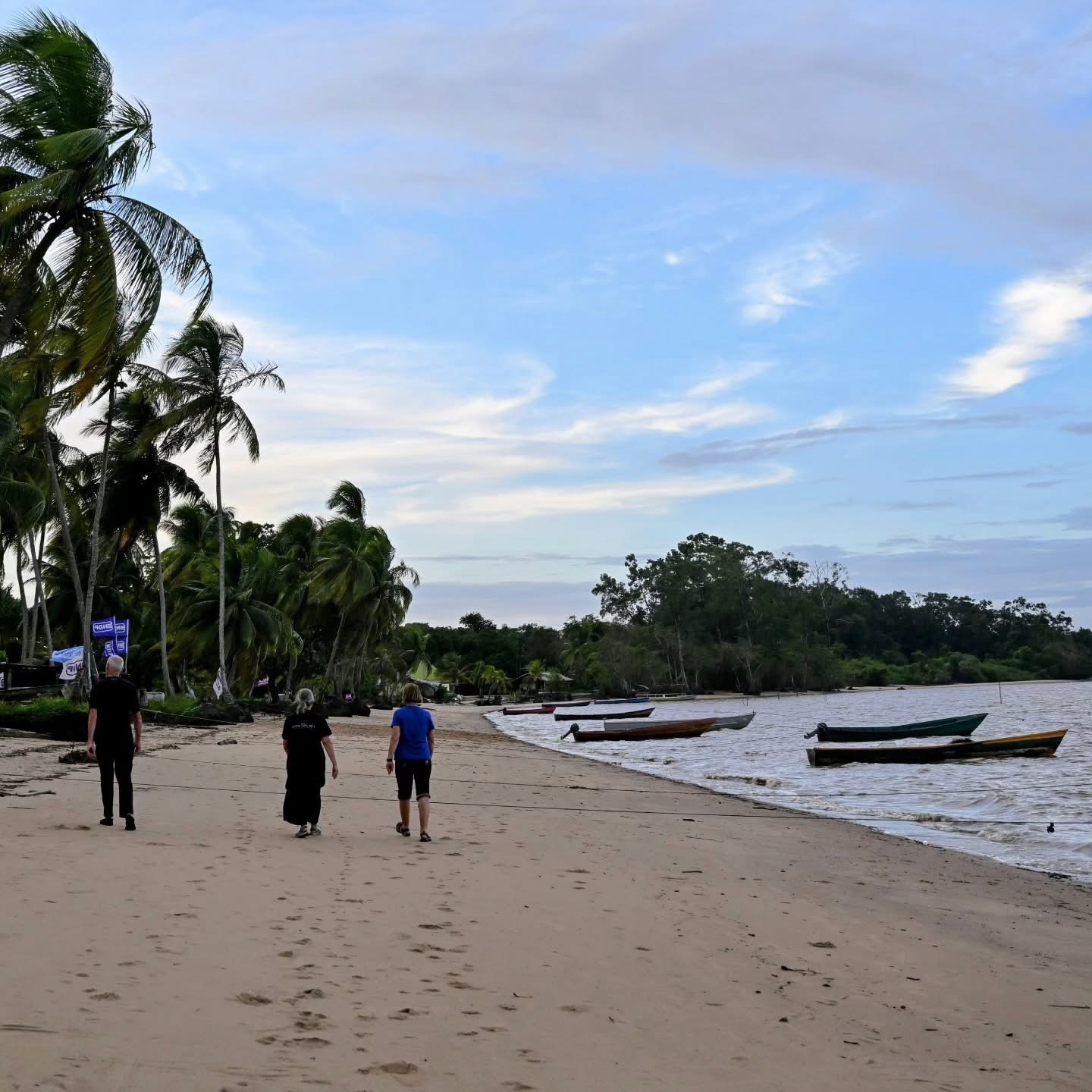

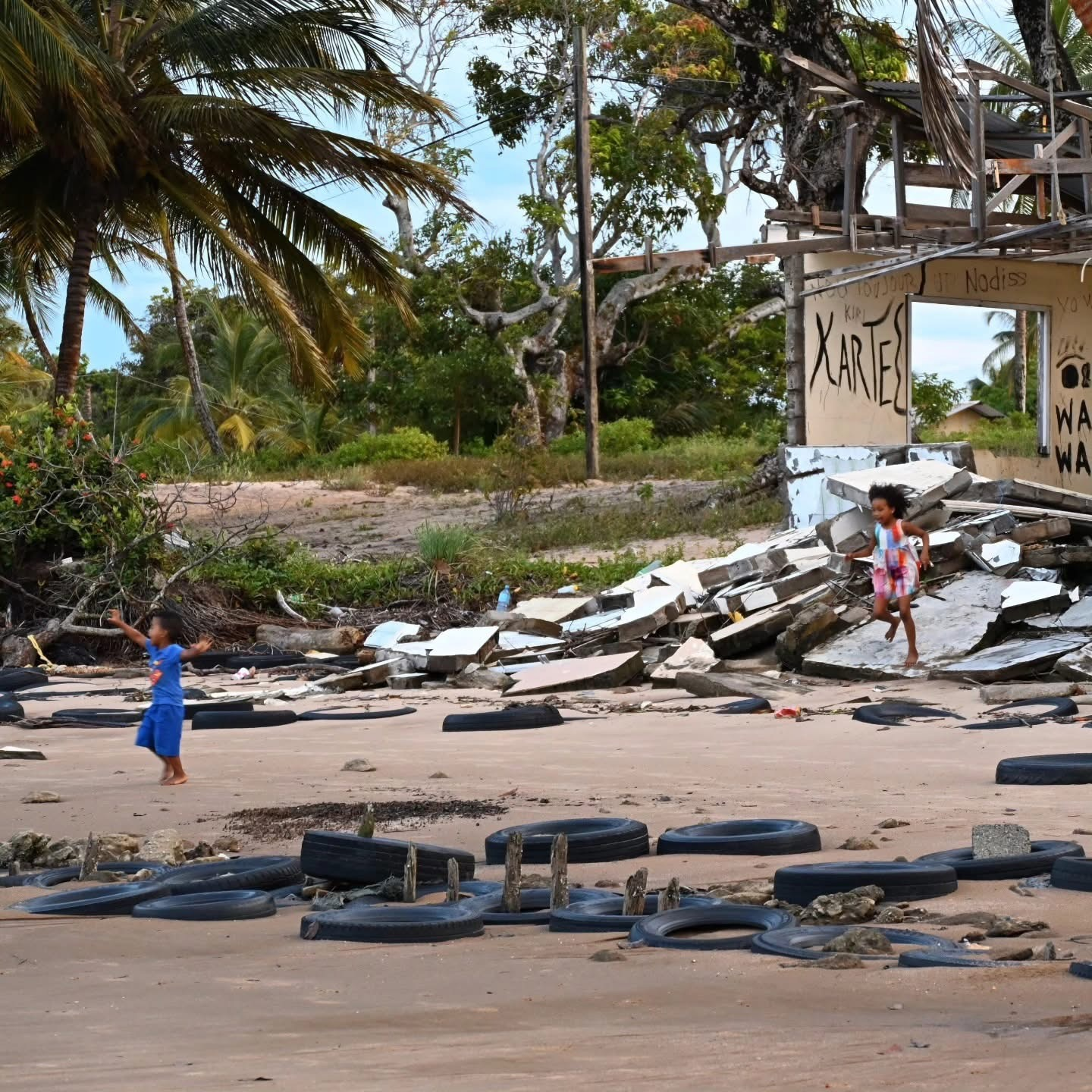

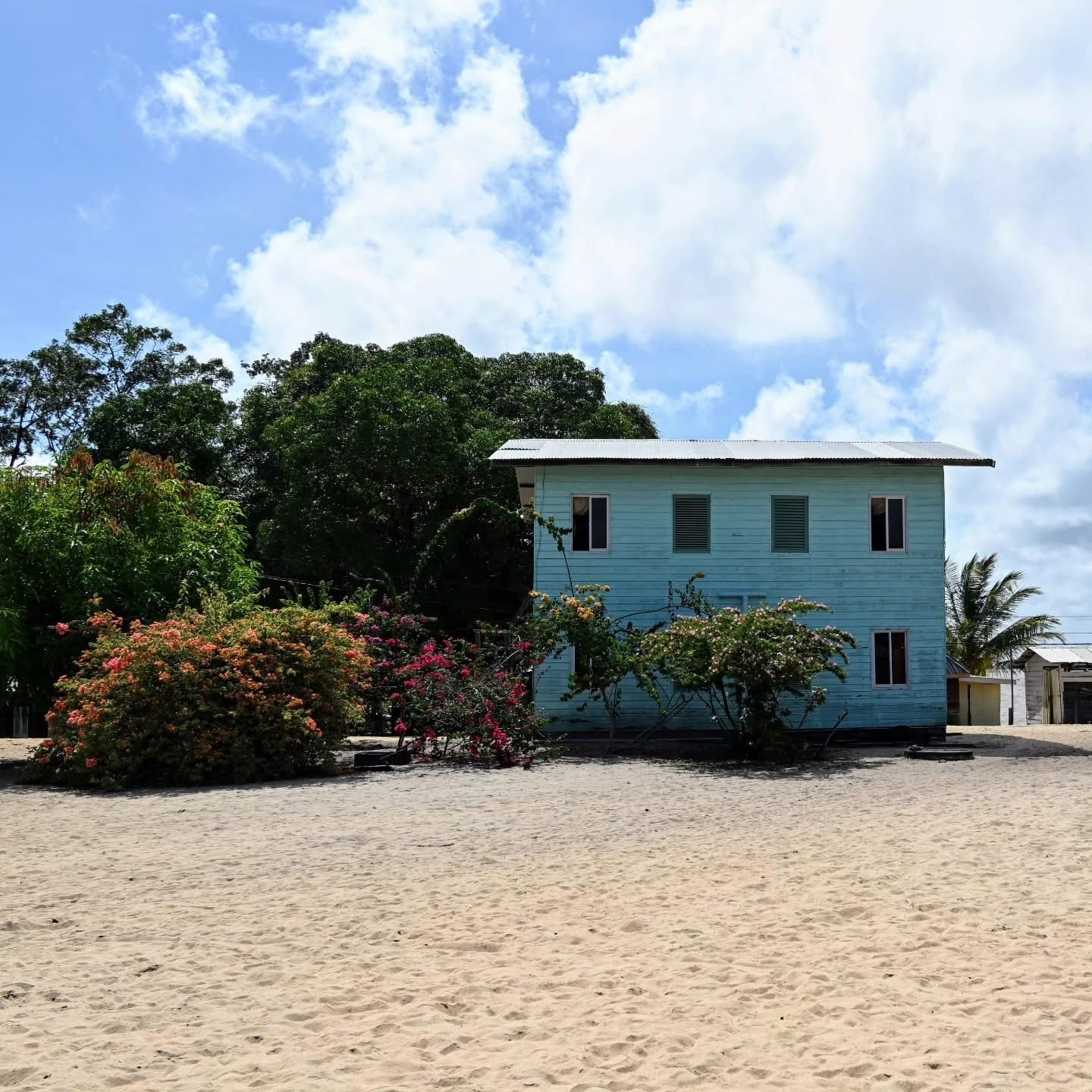

== See also ==
- Braamspunt
