= Kumarumã =

Kumarumã Santa Maria dos Galibis
- Location in Brazil Kumarumã (Brazil)
- Coordinates: 3.3789°N 51.2998°W
- Country: Brazil
- Region: North
- State: Amapá
- Municipality: Oiapoque

Government
  - Cacique: Paulo Roberto Silva

Population (2016)
  - Total: 2,240
- Time zone: UTC-3

Kumarumã is an Amerindian village of the Galibi Marworno people in the Brazilian municipality of Oiapoque, Amapá. It is the largest village of the tribe. Kumarumã was founded in the 1930s as Santa Maria dos Galibis. Kumarumã is located on an island in the Uaçá River in the Uaçá Indigenous Territory.

== Overview ==
The Galibi Marworno were originally from French Guiana and lived in Jesuit missions. A Portuguese offensive in the late 18th century drove them to land inwards, where they mixed with the Aruã and Marworno Amerindians. They use the self identification Galibi Marworno to distinguish themselves from the Galibis on the Oiapoque River.

In the 1930s, Santa Maria dos Galibis was established by the Indian Protection Service as a means to concentrate the population. The main language of the Galibi was Karipúna French Creole. In 1934, a school was built in the village, and started to teach in Portuguese. In the late 1960s, CIMI, a Catholic organisation, started teaching Karipúna French Creole.

Kumarumã also has a clinic, and a community house. The village consisted mainly of wooden houses built on stilts, however, the younger generation has begun to build brick houses.

Kumarumã has experienced a rapid growth in the 21st century, and a large part of the island has been deforested. The economy is based on fishing and subsistence farming. The villagers are known for their canoes which they export to French Guiana.

Kumarumã can only be accessed by boat, and is located about 45 kilometres down river from the Oiapoque River.

== Bibliography ==
- Anonby, Stan (2007). "A report on the creoles of Amapá". Journal of Language Survey Reports.
