= Adaheli =

Personification of the sun in Kalina mythology

Adaheli was the personification of the sun in the Kalina mythology of the Orinoco region of South America.

This sun god is referred to in an origin story collected in the early 20th century by Cornelius van Coll, a missionary in Suriname.

In the story, Adaheli was troubled by the fact that there were no people on Earth, and so he descended to earth to create them. Shortly thereafter, people first appeared, born from the caiman. All of the original women were quite beautiful. The others, on the other hand, found some of the men to be downright intolerable because of their appearance. The ugly men moved to the east with their wives, while the others moved to the west with their wives, which caused the original people to split up.
