= Karipúna French Creole =

Creole language of Brazil

- Amapá French Creole
- Lanc-Patuá, Kheuól
- Native to: Brazil
- Region: Uaçá Indian Reservation, Amapá, Brazil
- Native speakers: 2,400 (2008)
- Language family: French Creole: French Guianese Creole; Karipúna French Creole

Language codes
- ISO 639-3: kmv
- Glottolog: kari1301
- Linguasphere: 51-AAC-cdd
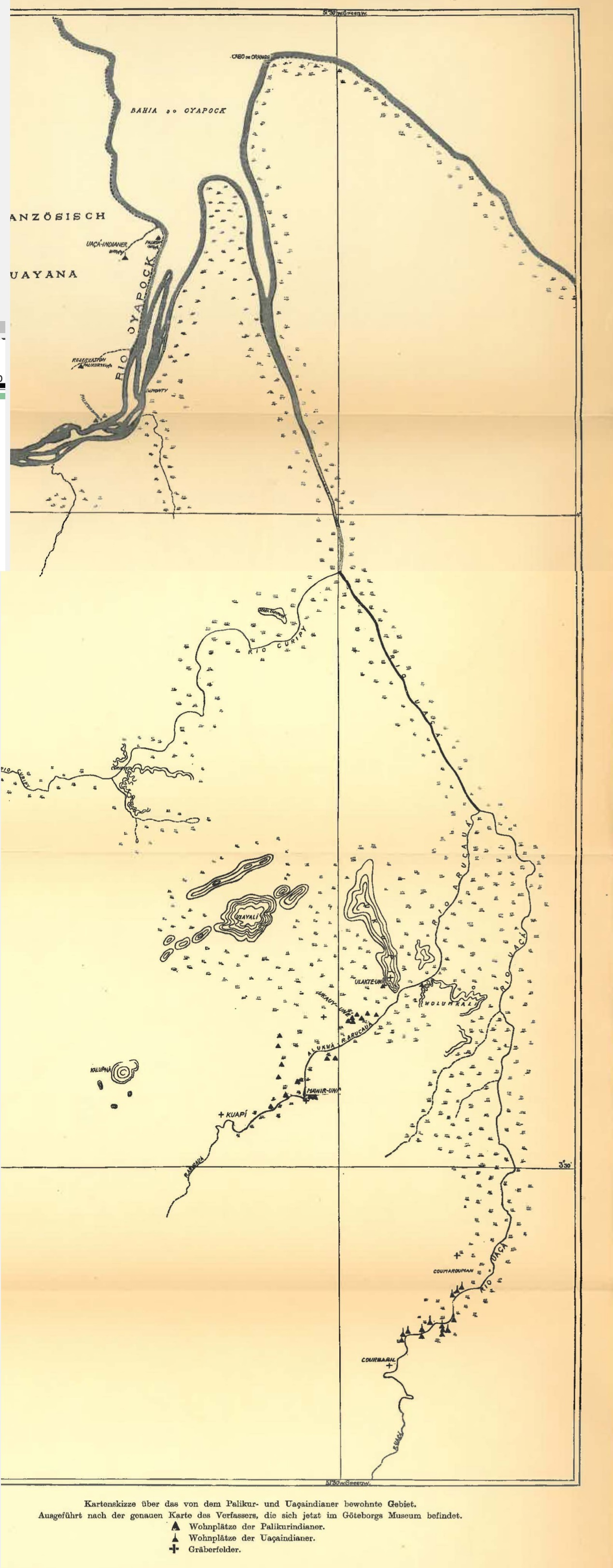
- The rivers Curipi and Aracaua in 1926

Karipúna French Creole, also known as Amapá French Creole and Lanc-Patuá, is a French-based creole language spoken by the Karipúna community, which lives in the Uaçá Indian Reservation in the Brazilian state of Amapá, on the Curipi and Oyapock rivers. It is mostly French-lexified except for flora and fauna terms, with a complex mix of substratum languages—most notably the Arawakan Karipúna language, identical with Palikúr.

Anonby notes that Portuguese tends to be the mother tongue for speakers under 60 in the Karipúna community, and Karipúna French Creole is the mother tongue primarily only for speakers over 60.

== History ==
The Karipúna community includes a mix of ethnicities to such a degree that at times (such as in the early 1930s) doubt arose as to whether or not the Karipúna should be referred to as indigenous peoples. Alleyne and Ferreira explain that "today, the Karipúna people are a highly mixed group, comprising not only descendants of Amerindians, but also of Africans, Asians and Europeans, and mixtures thereof."

John Ladhams offers what is probably the best description of the migration and formation of the current-day Karipúna population. Members of the Arawakan, Tupían, and Cariban linguistic families were in contact with European explorers since the 16th century, and around 1830 to the 1840s, due to the Cabanagem, a revolt by a group of indigenous people from the Pará region moved to what is now Amapá and which was claimed by French Guiana. They joined with existing ethnic groups, thus coming into contact with French or Guianese Creole speakers. Moving between French Guiana and Brazil in hotly contested territory from the Ounary to the Oyapock rivers, and finally towards the Curipi, where the Karipúna now live, these groups were joined by "members of the Palikúr and Galibí tribes, as well as Guianan Creoles, Arabs, Chinese, Europeans, and Brazilians" and eventually settled in the Uaçá area. "These were ‘displaced Brazilians … called Karipúnas’." Furthermore in 1854, due to a gold rush in Approuague, many "coolies, Blacks, Chinese, Martinicans and French adventurers" moved to the Oyapock and Uaçá rivers, where the Karipúna inhabited, further contributing to the broad ethnic mix.

Ladhams explains the adoption of a French creole by the group as a result of the broad ethnic backgrounds of the Karipúna. "Since at least the 1840s," the Karipúna community was "a highly disparate group ... and that there would have been an immediate need for a medium for inter-ethnic communication. A prime candidate for this would have been Guyanais," as it was already used by parts of the Amerindian members and most of the non-Amerindian members of the Karipúna community.

In December 1900, the Amapá region was ceded to Brazil from France, putting the Karipúna community in Brazilian territory, and in the 1920s, "Brazilian authorities deemed it necessary to implement projects for occupying the formerly contested territory whose ‘frenchified’ populations were seen as a threat to the country's territorial integrity." As a result the Oiapoque Colonization Commission was created in 1920. Later in 1927, an inspection commission commanded by the Ministry of War began to patrol the Oiapoque and report on the groups living there. The reports were the first to use the term of "Karipúna" for the inhabitants of the Cupiri River, and has been the label employed since. The Ministry of War intended to "incorporate the Indians into society," and from 1934–37, and then from 1945 onwards, non-indigenous teachers were recruited by the government to teach in Karipúna villages. This education "played a fundamental role in formulating the contemporary identity of these groups, in the propagation of the use of Portuguese and in the configuration of the villages."

The 1970s "were marked by greater political participation of the Uaçá leaders," including the Karipúna amongst the other three groups in the Uaçá reserve, "who began to act in more organized fashion." Particularly, they opposed the installation of the proposed route for the BR-156 highway, and this struggle resulted in further pressure to fight for the demarcation of their land. A new route of the highway was eventually accepted with "the hiring of indigenous heads to assist in the inspection of the borders of the indigenous territory."

It was also during this period that the "Kheuól-to-Portuguese bilingual education programme was instituted, largely through the efforts of CIMI (the Catholic mission) and with the approval of FUNAI, and later MEC." Since this period, there has been a stated focus on promoting the maintenance of KFC as a second language and defending Amerindian rights while also providing a "bridge to the outside world," to a varying degree of success, often criticized, both by members of the community and linguistic anthropologists such as Jo-Anne Ferreira. Only in the 1990s did indigenous teachers, however, begin to receive training first by CIMI, then by the Organization of Indigenous Teachers of Oiapoque established in 2005, and now "many of the teachers are Karipúna or Galibi-Marworno."

Overall, Karipúna populations are healthily growing after the original migration from Pará that lessened populations drastically. Alleyne and Ferreira note that "the Karipúna population in 2001 is six times larger than it was in 1943." However, despite the optimistic growth in population, the linguistic vitality of Karipúna French Creole is threatened.

== Current status ==
Today in the Uaçá Reservation there are three other Amerindian groups: the Galibi Marworno, who also speak a French Creole language incredibly similar to Karipúna, and the Palikúr and Galibi do Oiapoque indigenous groups who speak their own non-creole languages. Members of the latter groups are often bilingual in Amapá French Creole, though only the Karipúna and Galibi-Marworno speak AFC natively. Anonby finds that "the differences between all the French Creoles do not pose a serious problem to intelligibility."

The Karipúna people numbered 1,726 between 16 different villages in 2001. The largest, Manga, contained 465 people. They are far more dispersed as compared to the Galibi-Marworno community in the same reservation, wherein 1,578 out of a total population of 1,787 Galibi-Marworno are concentrated in the Kumaruma village.

=== Linguistic vitality ===
Ethnologue considers Karipúna French Creole to be "threatened," with a rating of 6b on the Graded Intergenerational Disruption Scale (GIDS). This designation seems generally due to the waning use of KFC as a mother tongue, and the steadily decreasing transmission rate. Anonby notes that Portuguese tends to be the mother tongue for speakers under 60 in the Karipúna community, and Karipúna French Creole is the mother tongue primarily only for speakers over 60. Anonby paraphrases from interviews with speakers, that "although most people understand KFC," a Karipúna speaker "admitted about half of the people in the village of Manga cannot speak it. He said there were no monolingual Karipúna speakers." Speakers of KFC tend to speak it as a second language, first learning Portuguese, and only learning KFC via a three-year Kheuól education primary school programme implemented by CIMI.

Anonby notes that "generally, [Karipúna] people feel that the loss of KFC is not a good thing. They feel nostalgia for the time when they all spoke it. At the same time, people feel very positive about speaking Portuguese." Ferreira likewise confirms this, referencing the "discontent felt by many indigenous leaders" who feel as though the state of education in KFC is not of a sufficient standard to be beneficial for the maintenance of KFC. This program was implemented in the 1980s by CIMI, the Catholic mission, but recently a new modified version of this program, the Projeto Político Pedagógico das Escolas Indígenas Karipúna e Galibi-Marworno, is in the process of being implemented, although the value of the new program in maintaining KFC is unclear. Overall, due to the difficulty in transmitting the language to younger speakers as either a mother tongue or second language, KFC is justifiably in a threatened state.

== Linguistic origins ==
French creoles in Brazil form two sub-groups, both in the Amapá regions. Southern Amapá consists only of "Amapá French Creole" (or Lanc-Patúa) and is spoken mainly around Macapá, the capital of Amapá state. Northern Amapá consists of two (relatively mutually intelligible) French-lexified creoles, both of which are considered "Amazonian French Creole," also often referred to as Kheuól, Crioulo, and Patuá. The two languages are "Karipúna French Creole" (KFC) as well as "Galibi-Marworno French Creole" (GMFC)

Alleyne and Ferreira, inspired by Ladham's social history generally agree that KFC is a direct descendant of Guyanais, or Guianan French Creole. As noted above, Ladham interprets the language as a tool which the ethnically fragmented early Karipúna communities employed to meet an "immediate need for a medium for inter-ethnic communication." This confirms that KFC's superstratum language is primarily French, but the other influences on the language are diverse and numerous. Alleyne and Ferreira suggest that the original "Karipúna" language — that is, that spoken by the original emigrants from Pará — "may or may not" have been a Tupi-Guarani language, and contributed to parts of the lexicon. Chris Corne notes that the indigenous influence is "substantial, particularly in the vocabulary of flora and fauna.

Despite the contact with African speakers that GFC no doubt had in its creolization process, Corne explains that "the African contribution, on present information, is surprisingly small, including only a handful of words from Bantu, Kwa, and Senegambian languages," although the African influences in grammar are more obvious. Lastly and unsurprisingly Corne mentions that "Portuguese has contributed basic vocabulary" of KFC for both lexical and functional categories of words. Some Kheuól words are even used in variation with Portuguese contributions to the lexicon, "for example, stilo and kanét (‘pen’), la nét and janél (‘window’)", generally as a result of increasing sociohistorical pressures from the mid-1900s as the Portuguese education system began to erode the transmission of KFC.

== Literature ==
Karipúna do Amapá is referred to by a wide variety of names colloquially and in linguistic literature, including "Karipúna do Norte (Karipúna French Creole)," Kheuól, Crioulo, Patoá, Patuá, Patúa, and Amazonian/Amapá/Amerindian French Creole (which all also include the closely related Galibi-Marworno French Creole language). Ethnologue refers to the language as "Karipúna Creole French."

Tolber provided what is apparently the first rigorous descriptive grammar of KFC. His account includes a lexicon with around 300 words, phonetic description of KFC, and analysis of the grammar at sentence, clause, word, and morpheme-level. The description is in-depth, categorical, and provides examples for various basic and complex sentence structures and clause types, along with justification of the classifications made. Based on Tobler's description and elicitation test, a phonetic inventory was made available for KFC online. Ladhams also notes that Monserrat & Silva published a grammar of Karipúna in Portuguese in 1984.

Also, in the same decade, two Karipúna-Portuguese dictionaries were published by A.W. Tobler (1987) and Montejo (1988). Tobler's Dicionário Crioulo Karipúna is published in Portuguese and contains an (approximately) 2100 Karipúna words with their Portuguese translation, and vice versa, and also provides an IPA pronunciation guide for Kheuól orthography.

Corne criticizes the "lack of serious lexicological research" for Karipúna French Creole and Guyanais in general. Despite the relatively large focus on documentation in the 1980s, little other linguistic documentation appears to be available. Ferreira states that "the Catholic mission, CIMI, has been largely responsible for promoting a three-year Kheuól education primary school programme." According to CIMI statements, the Karipúna and Galibi-Marworno have been working since 1978 to develop this educational process, but the "materials [for language education]" are not readily available and are most likely used in the community for the three-year language education program. According to Anonby some of the Karipúna French Creole texts have been published and they are "mainly Biblical stories and folk tales," along with language "primers, such as those edited and organized by Fransisca Picanco Montejo (1985)."

=== Documentation projects ===
The majority of rigorous Karipúna linguistic documentation was done in the 1980s, with Tobler (1983), Tobler (1987), Monserrat & Silva (1984) and Picanço (1988). Present-day language documentation agencies (such as Soas, Museu do Índio, Museu Goeldi, and Dobes, amongst others) do not seem to have assisted in the documentation of KFC.

Anonby's A Report on the Creoles of Amapá is the result of a joint study between SIL and the University of the West Indies to "investigate sociolinguistic aspects of the French-lexifier Creole languages spoken in the state of Amapá," albeit not funded by a particular major documentation project.

=== Ethnography ===
A series of anthropological analyses of the Karipúna community have been undertaken, especially in light of the Karipúna identity and schooling system. Tassinari and Cohn in 2009 critically evaluated, just like Ferreira, the bilingual education program and demonstrated the caveats in the CIMI-organized three-year educational programme. Ladhams is a well-cited and succinct socio-historical investigation of the Karipúna community's origins, which is generally accepted by anyone writing about KFC ethnography afterwards.

== Phonology ==
Karipúna French Creole has 32 phonemes — 22 consonants and 10 vowels. Its phoneme inventory is notably smaller than its lexifier language, French.

=== Consonants ===
Karipúna French Creole's 22 consonant phonemes are shown in the table below.

		Labial	Dental/ Alveolar	Palatal (-alveolar)	Velar	Glottal
Nasal		m	n		ŋ	
Plosive/ Affricate	voiceless	p	t̪	t͡ʃ	k	
Plosive/ Affricate	voiced	b	d̪	d͡ʒ	g	
Fricative	voiceless	f	s	ʃ		h
Fricative	voiced	v	z	ʒ		
Approximant			l	j	w	
Tap			ɾ			

Karipúna French Creole's consonants are relatively similar to French, with some exceptions. The palatal nasal stop, /ɲ/, voiced uvular fricative, /ʁ/, and labialized palatal approximant, /ɥ/, or /jʷ/, all of which are present in French, are not in KFC. Furthermore, /t/ and /d/ from French are dentalized in KFC. Lastly /h/ is present phonemically in KFC, despite having been lost in French due to historical sound changes.

=== Vowels ===
Karipúna French Creole has 10 phonemic vowels.

		Front	Central	Back
Close	oral	i		u
Close-mid	oral	e		o
Open-mid	oral	ɛ		ɔ
Open-mid	nasal	ɛ̃	ã	ɔ̃
Open	nasal	ɛ̃	ã	ɔ̃
Open	oral		a	

Again, compared to French's 17 vowels, KFC is significantly less complicated, losing /ɑ/, /ɛː/, /ə/, /œ/, /œ̃/, /ø/, and /y/.

Nonetheless, the French influence is obvious. Like in French, only the open-mid and open vowels have phonemic nasalized variants. Alleyne and Ferreira note that this is consistent with other French creoles, and evidence for the hypothesis that all (or many) Atlantic French creole languages descended from a common creole ancestor.

== Morphology ==
Relative to French and its substratum languages, Karipúna French Creole is more morphologically isolating, as tends to be the case with Caribbean creole languages. Morphemes in Karipúna French Creole are either root forms or derivational affixes, and inflectional affixes are apparently not present. Tobler notes that most words are monomorphemic.

=== Verb coercion ===
The "verbalizing" suffix /-e/ however can coerce some nouns into a verb class.

flɛʃ
arrow
"Arrow"

The "verbalizing" suffix /-e/ however can coerce some nouns into a verb class.

li flɛʃ-e
3SG.SUBJ arrow-VERB
"He/she shoots an arrow"

Pronouns in KFC form a two-number and three-case system, which is undergoing a regularizing change by analogy. The /li/ pronoun, and /ka/ tense marker (see below), will elide with an adjacent verb. The KFC lexicon on the whole is greatly derived from French and has undergone a process more morphological agglutination and "article reduction." Ladhams suggests that the Karipúna community is historically composed of "French Guinean Blacks, Chinese, Arabs, and Europeans," although the extent of non-European influence, outside of flora and fauna words, appears to be minimal. Arab and Chinese lexical influence is virtually nonexistent. Thus the generic open class of nouns involves morphologically reducing "la + noun" or "l’ + noun" to a monomorphemic word.

=== Pronouns ===
Karipúna French Creole's personal pronouns form a two-number, three-person system as in French, and are shown in the table below.

Person		Singular		Plural	
Personal pronouns	1st person	/mo/	‘I/me’	/no/	‘we/us’
Personal pronouns	2nd person	/u/, /to/	‘you’	/zɔt/	‘you/y’all’
Personal pronouns	3rd person	/li/, /so/	‘he/she/it/him/her’	/je/	‘they/them’
Possessive pronouns	1st person	/mo/, /mo-pa/	‘mine’	/no/, /no-pa/	‘ours’
Possessive pronouns	2nd person	/u/, /u-pa/	‘yours’	/zɔt/, /zɔt-pa/	‘yours/y’alls’
Possessive pronouns	3rd person	/so/, /so-pa/, /di-li/	‘his/hers/its’	/je/, /je-pa/	‘theirs’
Demonstratives		/sa/	‘this/that’	/le/	‘these/those’

The distinction between subject, direct object, and indirect object pronouns from French is simplified to a set of personal pronouns in KFC, which may occupy both subject and object position.

li kupe li
3SG.SUBJ cut 3SG.OBJ
"He/she cut it."

li pote sa bay mo
3SG.SUBJ take this/that give 1SG.OBJ
"He/she took this/that for me."

KFC has a no-case system and retained the nominative form, whereas other French creoles retained the oblique form.

Tobler, and Alleyne and Ferreira, give slightly different accounts of the pronouns, and the table above generally reflects the more recent account. Tobler does not make note of the /to/ and /so/ variants of the 2nd and 3rd person singular pronouns, which Alleyne and Ferreira explain is not present in other French creoles, (346) and is thus presumably an innovative change, by analogy with the 1st person singular /mo/. Similarly, Tobler cites /nu/ as the 1st person plural pronoun, but Alleyne and Ferreira explain that KFC has "regularized" this to /no/. The 2nd and 3rd person plural pronouns are consistent between accounts.

==== Possessive pronouns ====
In Alleyne and Ferreira, the bare possessive pronouns and the forms with the /-pa/ suffix are taken as equals. However, Tobler refers to the /-pa/ form as "possessive pronouns," and the bare form as "possessive adjectives." The difference appears to be that the pronominal form can occasionally fill a DP (as English "mine") as well as act as a genitive adjunct to a noun phrase (/u-pa liv/, "your book"), whereas the bare possessive form must be adjunct to the possessed NP.

==== Reflexive pronouns ====
Alleyne and Ferreira give a simple account of reflexive pronouns by appending the /-kɔ/ suffix, but Tobler's grammar explains the nuance of KFC reflexives. To indicate a reflexive pronoun, KFC uses the bare possessive form in the object position and appends the word "body" (/kɔ/), or the body part affected, as the possessed NP of the pronoun. position (in bold below).

mo bat mo kɔ
1SG.SUBJ hit 1SG.POSS body
"I hit myself."

mo kupe mo dwet
1SG.SUBJ cut 1SG.POSS finger
"I cut my finger."

In the case that no body part is affected, KFC can also use /mɛm/ for the emphatic self.

mo aʃte-l pu mo mɛm
1SG.SUBJ buy-3SG.OBJ for 1SG.POSS self
"I bought it for myself."

=== Agglutination ===
Karipúna French Creole both in historical sound shifts and in present variation has agglutinative morphophonemic changes. As in many French Creole languages, many French calques were glossed into KFC and subsequently agglutinated with a French definite article. Alleyne and Ferreira list four classes, based on the original French determiner.

Karipúna French Creole IPA	French Orthography	French IPA	English Gloss
Class I: (la, l’ + noun)
/labu/	(la) boue	/la bu/	‘mud’
/lafime/	(la) fumée	/la fyme/	‘smoke’
Class II: (les, des + noun)
/zam/	(les) armes	/lez‿aʁm/	‘gun’
/zo/	(les) os	/lez‿o/	‘bone’
Class III: (un, une + noun)
/nak/	(un) arc	/œ̃n‿aʁk/	‘arch’, ‘ark’
/nam/	(une) âme	/yn‿am/	‘soul’
Class IV: (du, de l’, des + noun)
/disɛm/	(du) sel	/dy sɛl/	‘salt’
/duhi/	(du) riz	/dy ʁi/	‘rice’

Some of these classes are open, such as class I, which takes new words loaned from French, while the others are not. The morphological reduction of the French article from these words does not have a consistent result on the syntactic category, despite all being non-proper nouns. Tobler claims that "almost all words are monomorphemic roots" in KFC, and the morphological reanalysis from French loanwords appears to move towards this conformity, as the French article, nor the noun stem, are "never found in isolation."

Morphophonemic shifts also occur in the 3rd-person singular pronoun and the present progressive marker in KFC. In the pre-verbal subject position, /li/ is often reduced to /i-/, and reduced to a verb suffix /-l/ in the post-verbal object position.

i kupe-l
3SG.SUBJ cut-3SG.OBJ
"He/she/it cut it."

The present tense marker /ka/, like /li/, also elides with non-back vowels at the beginning of a preceding verb.

mo k-ale
1SG.SUBJ PRES-go
"I'm going."

Morphophonemic reanalysis produces agglutination in KFC. Morpheme reanalysis and agglutination of this variety is common in creole languages, especially French-lexified creoles. Amongst French creole languages some of these categories are shared, but others are not, and Alleyne and Ferreira (amongst others) suggest that this may be an effective area of research for understanding the origins and development of French creole languages.

=== Reduplication ===
Reduplication is often considered a hallmark of creole language morphology, along with morphological conversion and compounding. Compounding, as above, is present in KFC, and as expected so too is reduplication. Tobler (1983) notes the highly productive reduplication possible in KFC.

li maʃe li maʃe li maʃe
3SG.SUBJ walk 3SG.SUBJ walk 3SG.SUBJ walk
"He/she walked for a long time/long way." (CP reduplication)

li ka kɔlɛ ke kɔlɛ
3SG.SUBJ PRES be.angry FUT be.angry
"He/she is very angry." (VP reduplication)

li te blã blã
3SG.SUBJ PAST white white
"It was very white/white as snow." (AP reduplication)

Tobler shows that reduplication in possible in a large variety of syntactic and morphological contexts. In all cases it tends to "emphasize the degree or quantity of that which is reduplicated," which corresponds to the generalized "more of the same meaning."

== Syntax ==
Creole languages tend to be characterized by a lack of "complex inflectional morphology in general," and appropriately syntactically- or morphologically-induced changes in verb valency are generally rare. Tobler's grammar does however mention a limited passive syntactic construction, as well as a causative transitive construction. No mention of other valency-changing constructions, such as antipassives or comitative case, seem to be present in any investigation of the language.

=== Valency change ===
==== Passives ====
As seems to be the case with the majority of creole languages, Karipúna French Creole lacks a true passive voice. Papiamento may be the only Atlantic Creole to possess a full passive.

Tobler notes that outside of certain stative clauses, the passive form can't be used. Utterances are expressed solely in the active form. For example, the phrase "I was bitten by a wasp" must be expressed as "the wasp bit me," as below:

muʃ mɔde mo
wasp bite 1SG.OBJ
"The wasp bit me."

And the expression "all the bananas were eaten" might be expressed in either of the following ways:

nu mãdʒe tut bakɔv
1PL.SUBJ eat all banana
"We ate all the bananas."

pa hete bakɔv
NEG stay banana
"There were no bananas left."

With active (cf. stative) verbs in Karipúna French Creole, the passive form cannot be used. While in (3) the number of arguments has been reduced to only a subject (‘banana’), /hete/ is an intransitive verb typically. In other words, Karipúna French Creole non-stative verbs do not have a valency-reducing form.

As stated before, the vast majority of French creoles lack a passive form. While in some French creole communities a passive form can be used, such as in Haitian French Creole, it doesn't seem to be considered a part of a creole itself, but rather a French borrowing (Mandaly 2011). Jacobs analyzes another potential source for creole passives, however, suggesting that substratum origins and contact with earlier creole languages likely was the result of the oddly-distributed use of the passive in Papiamento, rather than top-down European-language influence.

Tobler demonstrates how a pseudo-passive can be formed by coercing the verb into a verbal adjective, turning a monotransitive sentence into an intransitive one.

kaz la pẽtʃihe
house DEM paint
"The house is painted."

Compared with the active construction:

i pẽtʃihe kaz
3SG.SUBJ paint house
"He/she painted the house."

This kind of construction for the verb is not necessarily a full passive, and can only form strictly stative constructions, using only auxiliary or verb-null copula phrases. Tobler notes "one cannot say, ‘The house was painted by John’; this must be expressed actively as ‘John painted the house’" (Tobler 1983, 54). Clearly in this phrase /pẽtʃihe/ is no longer functioning as a VP in the passive construction, as it cannot take an agentive adjunct (‘by John’).

Interaction with verb stativity appears to be a common feature of Atlantic creole languages, and Winford (1988) looks to creole passivity to discuss the possible West African origins of the passive form. Karipúna French Creole's semi-passive verbal adjective form may, rather than the result of a superstratum French influence, be a construction derived from one of Karipúna's many substratum languages.

==== Causatives ====
Karipúna French Creole does have a causative construction, using the auxiliary verb "make" (/fɛ/), which appears to be a widely productive, valency-increasing form. The "make" auxiliary changes either an intransitive construction into a transitive one, or a transitive to a ditransitive.

mo lẽj te sɛk
1SG.POSS clothes PAST.COMPL dry
"My clothes (were) dry."

solej ka fɛ mo lẽj sɛk
sun PRES.PROG make 1SG.POSS clothes dry
"The sun is making my clothes dry."

It is apparent that there is a valency increase with the introduction of the "make" auxiliary, given that the tense marker "te" is no longer present in the /mo lẽj sɛk/ verbal compliment(s). While KFC can, and often does, use a null tense marker to indicate present completeness for "experience and state" verbs, like /sɛk/, the gloss Tobler provides gives no evidence of a present-complete meaning. Therefore, we analyze this not as an embedded CP complement to /fɛ/, but rather as a valency-increase of the VP /sɛk/ from intransitive to monotransitive.

ye fãde bwa
3PL.SUBJ chop wood
"They chopped wood."

li fɛ ye fãde bwa boku
3SG.SUBJ make 3SG.SUBJ chop 3SG.SUBJ much
"He/she made them chop a lot of wood."

A similar analysis can be taken to the monotransitive-to-ditransitive use of /fɛ/. Tobler's gloss suggests that the null past complete tense marker that "event and process" verbs take applies to "make," rather than "chop" in the causative construction, and therefore does not represent mere CP-embedding.

=== Tense ===
Karipúna French Creole's system of tense marking is complex, with "five overt tense markers and another [null] marker." However the meaning of the null tense marker is dependent on the class of verb phrase.

Tobler (1983) distinguishes five classes of verb phrase: Event, Experience, Process, State A, and State B. State A and B are typically copular, comparative, possessive or similar phrases that lack a main verb statement. KFC non-auxiliary verbs fall into the categories of Event, Experience, and Process verbs. Event verbs typically include transitives such as /ale/, "go," and /aʃte/, "buy." Experience and Process verbs, vaguely, characterize intransitive experiences and processes, although Tobler fails to provide specific examples of the distinctions. Tobler does note that Event and Experience verbs take a semantic agent, while Process and State phrases lack one, such that Experience verbs (like /sɔtʃi/, "leave/get out," and /asi/, "sit") could be analyzed as unergatives, and Process verbs (like /bule/, "be burned," and /tõbe/, "fall") as unaccusatives.

Tense marking for sentences in KFC interacts with the class of verb phrase in the sentence. All classes of VP use the /ke/ future tense marker, and /teke/ conditional tense marker.

si li mi nu ke mãje-l
if 3SG ripe 1PL FUT eat-3SG.OBJ
"If it's ripe, then we will eat it."

si mo te gã lajõ mo teke aʃte wun hadj
if 1SG PRES have money 1SG COND buy one radio
"If I had had the money, I would have bought a radio."

Exclusive to Event and Process class VPs is the present progressive /ka/ marker, and the past incomplete tense marker /teka/. For event and process verbs, a null tense marker is analyzed as the past complete tense.

dʒife ka fun ghɛs la
fire PRES.PROG melt lard DEM
"The fire is melting the lard."

li ale la kote je teka bhiga
3SG go there where 3PL PAST.INCOMPL fight
"He went where they were fighting."

lapli ø tõbe tu nanwit
rain PAST.COMPL fall all in.night
"The rain fell all night."

For Experience and State class VPs, the past complete tense is marked by the tense marker /te/, whereas the null tense marker is understood as the present progressive tense.

mo te malad
1SG.SUBJ PAST.COMPL sick
"I was sick."

mo kɔ ø ʃɔ
1SG.POSS body PRES hot
"I am hot."

=== Conditionals ===
The "conditional tense marker" /teke/ indicates a strictly hypothetical conditional relation ("if S had been, H would have"). The conditional marker /si/ can also be used with other tense markers than /teke/ however, but requires strict correspondence between the markers used. Tobler distinguishes three kinds of conditional constructions, employing distinct uses of the tense markers.

The first conditional, "authentic" construction is used for genuine, specific, events, that haven't occurred yet. This construction uses the present progressive tense marker /ka/ in the conditional phrase and the future tense marker /ke/ in the result phrase. For example:

si li ka hive li ke bõ
if 3SG PRES.PROG arrive 3SG FUT good
"If he arrives it will be good."

The (former) conditional clause in this construction can also drop /ka/, with no apparent semantic change.

The "generalization" conditional construction applies to general rules and principles about the world, using the null tense marker in the conditional phrase and the present progressive /ka/ in the result phrase, as such:

si u ø kupe vitmã ka fãde
if 2SG PAST.INCOMPL cut quickly PRES.PROG break
"If you cut it quickly it will break."

The hypothetical conditional construction translates roughly to "if S had been, H would have," and uses the past complete /te/ marker for the conditional clause, and the conditional /teke/ marker for the main clause. This construction applies strictly to hypothetical situations that might have happened, rather than ones that have habitually (the generalization construction) or may in the future (the "authentic" construction).

si-l te hive mo teke pale ke-l
if-3SG PAST.COMPL arrive 1SG COND talk with-3SG
"If he had arrive, I would have talked with him."

== See also ==
- French Guianese Creole
- Antillean creole
