= Uaçá River =

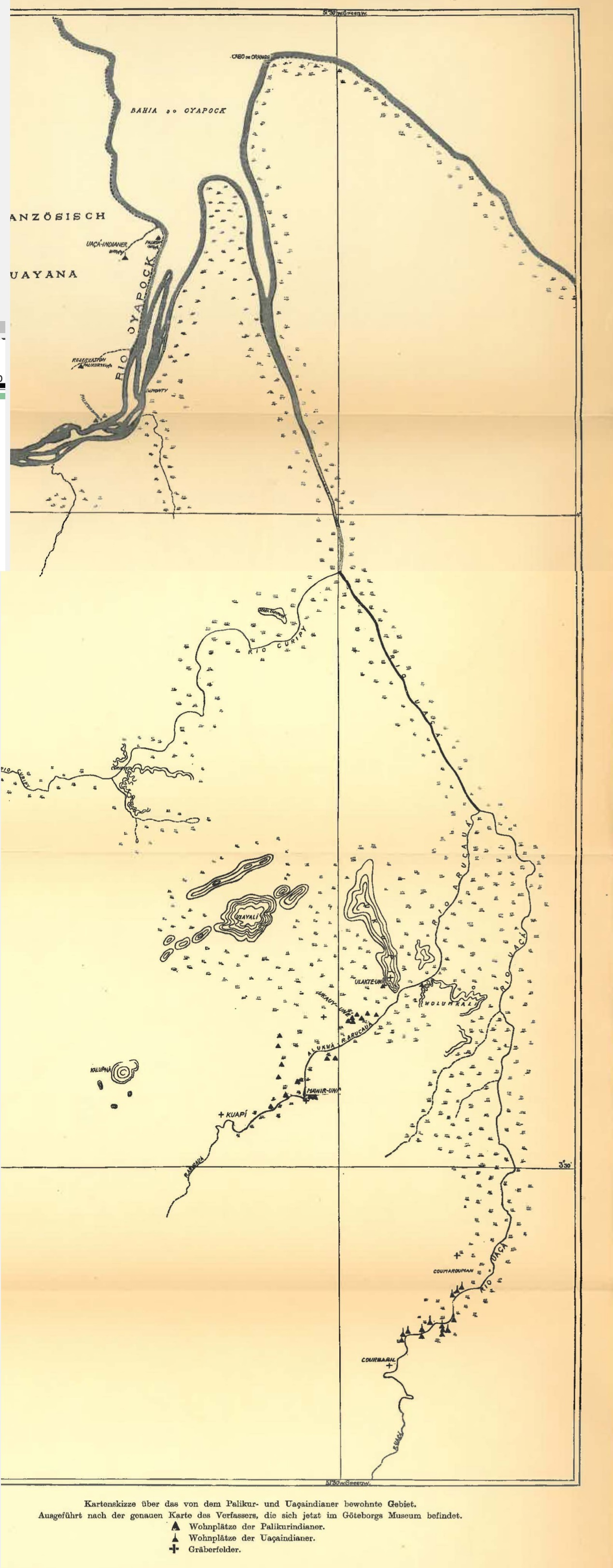

Location
- Country: Brazil

Physical characteristics
- Source
  - location: Amapá state
- Mouth
  - coordinates: 4°13′N 51°32′W

Uaçá River is a river of Amapá state in Brazil. It is a tributary of the Oiapoque River.

The area is inhabited by the Galibi Marworno, also called the Uaçá Galibi. They are a mixture of Galibi who fled from French Guiana, and Aruã who fled from the island Marajó. In the 1930, the Indian Protection Service (SPI) founded the village Santa Maria dos Galibis (now called Kumarumã) for them on in island in the river.
