= Galibi Marworno =

Total population
- 2822 (2020)

Regions with significant populations
- Amapá, Brazil

Languages
- Karipúna French Creole

The Galibi Marworno, also called the Uaçá Galibi, are an Indigenous people along the Uaçá River in the north of Brazilian state Amapá, near the border with French Guiana. They are a subgroup of the Galibi.

The Galibi Marworno mainly live in the Indigenous Territories Uaçá I, Uaçá II and Juminá. The village Santa Maria dos Galibis (now called Kumarumã) was founded for them in the 1930s by the Indian Protection Service (SPI) on an island in the Uaçá River as a means to concentrate the population. The Galibi Marworno also share the villages Kunanã and Uahá with the Karipuna do Amapá.

Historical population
Year	Pop.	±% p.a.
1854	80	—
1886	100	+0.70%
1925	126	+0.59%
2000	1,794	+3.60%
2014	2,529	+2.48%
2020	2,822	+1.84%
Source: Smithsonian Institution, Secretariat of Indigenous Health (SESAI)

The Galibi were originally from French Guiana, where they lived in Jesuit missions. A Portuguese offensive in the late 18th century drove them inland. Here they mixed with the Aruã (spelled Aruá in this region), who themselves had been driven from the island Marajó since the 17th century, and with the Marworno. The name Galibi Marworno is a recent self-designation by the mixed group, used to distinguish themselves from the Galibi on the Oiapoque River.

The Indigenous Missionary Council (CIMI) started teaching Karipúna French Creole to Galibi Marworno children in a school in Santa Maria dos Galibis in the 1960s. In the 1970s, the indigenous groups near the Oiapoque area banded together and formed political action groups. This resulted in the demarcation by FUNAI of a common area of 5,181 square kilometres (2,000 sq mi) for the Galibi Marworno, the Palikur and the Karipuna do Amapá. In 1992, an organisation called Apoio was established as a political association for all indigenous groups in the region.

The traditional diet of the Galibi Marworno is centred around the cassava, and consists of cassava flour, a cassava sauce called tucupi and the cassava beverage caxiri, all complemented by fish. Their main festival is called Turé. Their traditional hero is called Iaicaicani and their legends include the Cobra-Grande. Their patron saint is Mary, mother of Jesus.
