= Amapa =

Amapa may refer to:

- Amapá, one of the states of Brazil
  - Amapá (municipality), a municipality in that Brazilian state
  - Amapá mangroves, an ecoregion along the Atlantic coast
  - Amapá National Forest, a national forest
  - Amapá State Forest, a state forest
  - Amapá Biodiversity Corridor, an ecological corridor
  - Amapá Question, a 1895 border dispute involving France and Brazil
- Amapa, Nayarit, a town in the Mexican state of Nayarit
- Amapa River, a river in the Mexican states of Oaxaca and Veracruz
- Amapa morada, common name for the tree Handroanthus impetiginosus, in the family Bignoniaceae, which ranges from northern Mexico to Argentina
- Amapa, common name for the tree Parahancornia fasciculata, in the family Apocynaceae, from the Amazon rainforest
