= BR-156 (Brazil highway) =

Road in Brazil

BR-156

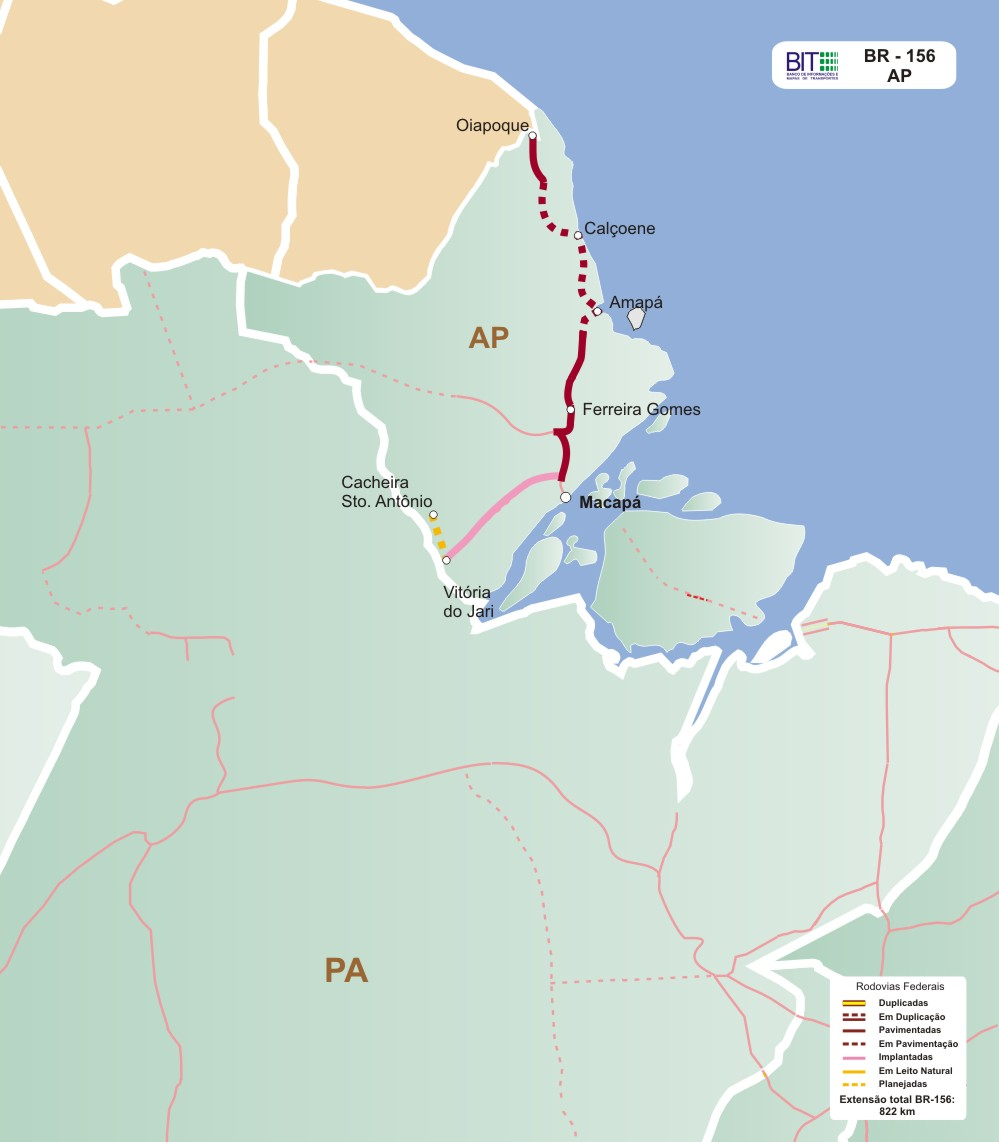

Route information

Major junctions
- South end: Laranjal do Jari, Amapá; BR-210 Macapá; BR-210 Porto Grande; Ferreira Gomes; Tartarugalzinho; Pracuúba; Amapá; Calçoene; AP-260 Lourenço
- North end: Oiapoque, Amapá; RN2 Saint-Georges

Location
- Country: Brazil

Highway system
- Highways in Brazil; Federal

BR-156 is a federal highway of Brazil.

The road consists of 552 km between Oiapoque and Macapá, and 271 km between Macapá and Laranjal do Jari (except via Santana city), totalling 823 km of road through forest and savannah. Only the road between Macapá and Calçoene is paved with asphalt. The rest of the road has a dirt surface.

Because of the road conditions, it takes around 10-12 hours to drive between Oiapoque and Macapá.

With the Oyapock River Bridge (linking the cities of Oiapoque in Brazil and Saint-Georges-de-l'Oyapock in French Guiana) open to traffic starting from 20 March 2017, it is now possible to drive from Macapá to Cayenne, the capital city of French Guiana.
