= Bailique =

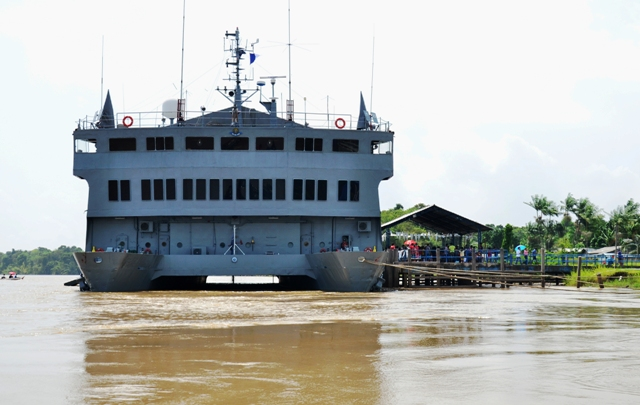
- Vila Progresso on the island of Marinheiros in Bailique

- Location in Brazil Bailique (Brazil)
- Coordinates: 0.8670°N 50.0755°W
- Country: Brazil
- Region: North
- State: Amapá
- Municipality: Macapá

Area
  - Total: 1,724 km^{2} (666 sq mi)

Population (2010)
  - Total: 7,618
  - Density: 4.419/km^{2} (11.44/sq mi)
- Time zone: UTC−3 (BRT)

Bailique is a district in the Brazilian municipality of Macapá, in the state of Amapá. Bailique is an archipelago of islands in the Amazon River. It consists of eight major islands. The district is limited to the north by the Araguari River, to the south by Canal do Norte, and to the east by the Atlantic Ocean. In 1936, the islands became a district of the capital Macapá.

== Islands ==
The islands of the archipelago are:

- Ilha de Bailique
- Ilha do Brigue
- Ilha Curuá
- Ilha do Faustino
- Ilha do Franco
- Ilha dos Marinheiros
- Igarapé do Meio
- Ilha Parazinho, an uninhabited island which nowadays contains Parazinho Biological Reserve.

The majority of settlements are rural villages made of stilt houses along the rivers and coast. The infrastructure on the islands is limited. There are several primary schools, and one high school, but there are no clinics, no clean drinking water, and no ferry to the mainland.

The archipelago is positioned at a location where different biomes meet. The tropical rainforest and mangrove forests meet the reef of the mouth of the Amazon.

== Economy ==
The economy of the islands is based on fishing in the rivers and the Atlantic Ocean, subsistence farming, and cultivation and harvesting of the Açaí palm. Bee keeping is a recent addition.

== Soil erosion ==
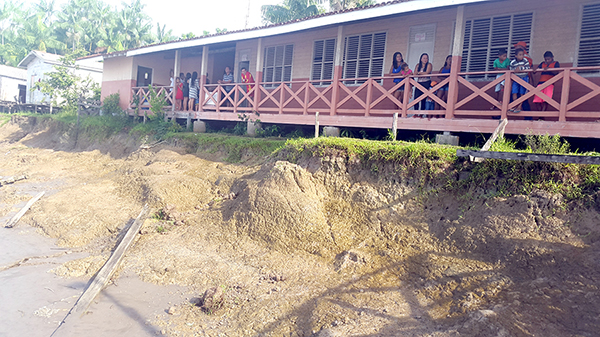
Soil erosion on Bailique

The Araguari River, a river north of the Amazon, was known for its tidal bore which created enormous waves. In 2013, three dams were built in the river to generate hydroelectricity. The dams ended the tidal bore which altered the flow of water in the Amazon, and caused significant land erosion and damage to the archipelago. The Bosque School, the only high school on the islands, is at risk of collapsing. In 2018, an emergency was declared by the State of Amapá, because 700 people had been affected by the fallen land. The current rate of erosion is estimated at one metre a year.

== See also ==
- Sucuriju, a fishing village in the municipality of Amapá founded by inhabitants of the Bailique islands.

== Bibliography ==
- Petterle, Selma Rodrigues; Urquhart de Cademartori, Sérgio (2016). "IV Encontro Internacional do Conpedi/Oñati" (PDF) (in Portuguese). Conselho Nacional de Pesquisa e Pós-Graduação em Direito. ISBN 978-85-5505-146-3.
