= Pucacuro National Reserve =

Peruvian nature reserve

- IUCN category VI (protected area with sustainable use of natural resources)
- Location within Peru
- Location: Peru; Loreto Region
- Nearest city: Intuto, Loreto Province, Loreto Region
- Coordinates: 2°26′53″S 75°20′29″W
- Area: 637,953.83 ha (1,576,418.2 acres)
- Established: 24 October 2010
- Governing body: SERNANP

Pucacuro National Reserve (Spanish: Reserva Nacional Pucacuro) is a protected area in Peru, located in the region of Loreto.

== Geography ==
The reserve comprises the Pucacuro River basin, a forested area with hills, river terraces, seasonally flooded terrain, swamps, meandering rivers and ca. 40 oxbow lakes. Besides the Pucacuro River (a tributary of the Tigre River), other important rivers in the reserve are the Aleman and Baratillo rivers.

== Ecology ==
The reserve is located in the Napo moist forests ecoregion.

=== Flora ===
Plant species present in the reserve include: Mauritia flexuosa, Oenocarpus bataua, Astrocaryum chambira, Iriartea deltoidea, Euterpe precatoria, Couma macrocarpa, Parahancornia peruviana, Ceiba pentandra, Socratea exorrhiza, Cedrela odorata, Vochysia lomatophylla, Simarouba amara, Calophyllum brasiliense, Cedrelinga cateniformis, Iryanthera macrophylla, Osteophloeum platyspermum, Ocotea aciphylla, etc.
