= Sucuriju =

- Location in Brazil Sucuriju (Brazil)
- Coordinates: 1.6768°N 49.9348°W
- Country: Brazil
- Region: North
- State: Amapá
- Municipality: Amapá

Population (2010)
  - Total: 939
- Time zone: UTC−3 (BRT)

Sucuriju is a fishing village and district in the Brazilian municipality of Amapá, in the state of Amapá. The village is located on the Sucuriju River near the Atlantic Ocean.

== History ==
Sucuriju is on the South American continent, however it is surrounded by the Lago Piratuba Biological Reserve which gives the village island characteristics. The village started with a couple of factories used by the fishermen of the Bailique Archipelago. In the 1920s, residential houses were constructed around the factories. Sucuriju consists of a hundred buildings on a bridge parallel to the river. It contains a school, a health post, a Catholic church and a Pentecostal church.

The economy of Sucuriju is based on fishing. Both the nearby lakes and the Atlantic coast are being fished. The village can only be accessed by boat and is located about 12 hours from Amapá. In 1956, it became a district of Amapá.

== Bibliography ==
- Sautchuk, Carlos (2006). "Esse rio nasceu da noite pro dia". A Vila de Sucuriju, comunidade pesqueira do litoral do Amapá (in Portuguese and Spanish). ACT Brasil.
