= Lago Piratuba Biological Reserve =

Protected area in Brazil

- Reserva Biológica do Lago Piratuba
- IUCN category Ia (strict nature reserve)
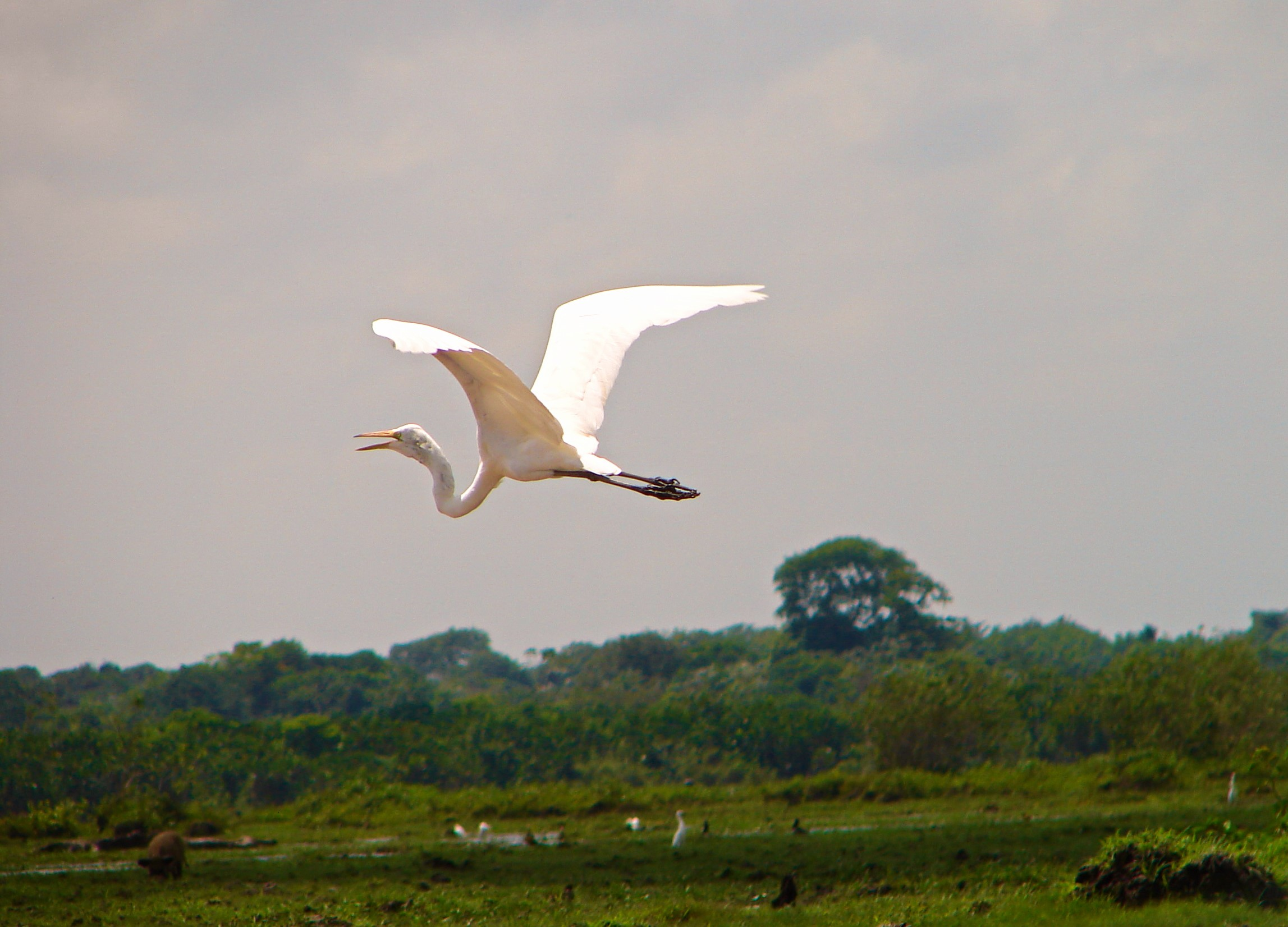
- Heron in Lago Piratuba

- Location within Brazil
- Nearest city: Sucuriju
- Coordinates: 1°35′13″N 50°12′11″W
- Area: 392,469 hectares (969,810 acres)
- Designation: Biological reserve
- Created: 16 July 1980

Lago Piratuba Biological Reserve (Portuguese: Reserva Biológica do Lago Piratuba) is a biological reserve in the state of Amapá, Brazil.

== Location ==
The Lago Piratuba Biological Reserve, which covers 392,469 hectares (969,810 acres), was established by decree of 16 July 1980. It is administered by the Chico Mendes Institute for Biodiversity Conservation. It covers parts of the municipalities of Pracuúba, Tartarugalzinho and Amapá in the state of Amapá.

The average annual temperature is about 26 °C (79 °F). Annual rainfall averages more than 3,259 millimetres (128.3 in). Relative humidity is 80%. The region is flat, formed by sediments of mixed river and ocean origin, and subject to periodic flooding. There is great diversity of plants, with dense floodplain rainforest transitioning into coastal mangrove. Fauna is also very diverse, including green sea turtle (Chelonia mydas) and leatherback sea turtle (Dermochelys coriacea), migrating or resident birds such as pelicans and osprey, and mammals such as capybara, otter and racoon in the flooded fields.

The North-eastern point is not included in the reserve, because it contains the village of Sucuriju. The reserve surrounding the village gives it island characteristics.

== Conservation ==
The Biological Reserve is a "strict nature reserve" under IUCN protected area category Ia, with a total area of 357,000 hectares (880,000 acres) of which 19,848 hectares (49,050 acres) was marine. It is part of the Amapá Biodiversity Corridor, created in 2003. The conservation unit is supported by the Amazon Region Protected Areas Program. The main objective is to protect the flora and fauna of the Amazon ecosystem in its transition into the lagoon zone. Protected species are jaguar (Panthera onca), giant otter (Pteronura brasiliensis) and Amazonian manatee (Trichechus inunguis).

== Sources ==
- Corredor de Biodiversidade do Amapá Biodiversity Corridor (PDF), Belém: CI-Brasil, Governo do Amapá, Fundação Lee & Gund, 2007
- Full list: PAs supported by ARPA, ARPA
- Reserva Biológica Lago Piratuba (in Portuguese), Chico Mendes Institute for Biodiversity Conservation
- Reserva Biológica do Lago Piratuba (in Portuguese), ViaRural, archived from the original on April 23, 2016
- Triana, Elisa (29 May 2009), "Strict Nature Reserves in Brazil", The Encyclopedia of Earth
- Unidade de Conservação: Reserva Biológica do Lago Piratuba (in Portuguese), MMA: Ministério do Meio Ambiente
- Unidade de Conservação: REBIO do Lago de Piratuba (in Portuguese), ISA
