= Parazinho Biological Reserve =

Biological reserve in Amapá, Brazil

- Reserva Biológica do Parazinho
- IUCN category Ia (strict nature reserve)
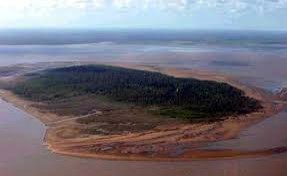
- Parazinho Island

- Location within Brazil
- Coordinates: 0°53′08″N 49°59′39″W
- Area: 276 hectares (680 acres)
- Designation: Biological reserve
- Created: 21 January 1985
- Administrator: Secretaria de Estado do Meio Ambiente do Amapá

The Parazinho Biological Reserve (Portuguese: Reserva Biológica do Parazinho) is a biological reserve in the state of Amapá, Brazil. It protects an island at the mouth of the Amazon River.

== Location ==
The Parazinho Biological Reserve is in the municipality of Macapá, Amapá. It has an area of 276 hectares (680 acres). It covers an island on the north shore of the mouth of the Amazon River. The island formed in the Quaternary period, and is an example of an alluvial island. The terrain is flat with clay, silt and sand sediments deposited by the sea and the river. Soil fertility is poor to moderate.

== Environment ==
Vegetation is pioneer formations of dense tropical rainforest. The action of waves and tides often causes trees on the coast to fall. Vegetation includes medium-sized trees, shrubs, some palms, mangroves and reeds. The reserve supports a program for protecting Amazon turtles. It supports migratory bird species of the Charadrius, Calidris and Sterna families, and of the laughing gull (Leucophaeus atricilla) and lesser yellowlegs (Tringa flavipes) species.

== History ==
The Parazinho Biological Reserve was created by state decree 005 of 21 January 1985 on Parazinho Island, in the Bailique Archipelago. It became part of the Amapá Biodiversity Corridor, created in 2003.

== Sources ==
- Corredor de Biodiversidade do Amapá Biodiversity Corridor (PDF), Belém: CI-Brasil, Governo do Amapá, Fundação Lee & Gund, 2007
- REBIO do Parazinho (in Portuguese), ISA: Instituto Socioambiental
