= Amapá National Forest =

National forest in Amapá, Brazil

- Floresta Nacional do Amapá
- IUCN category VI (protected area with sustainable use of natural resources)
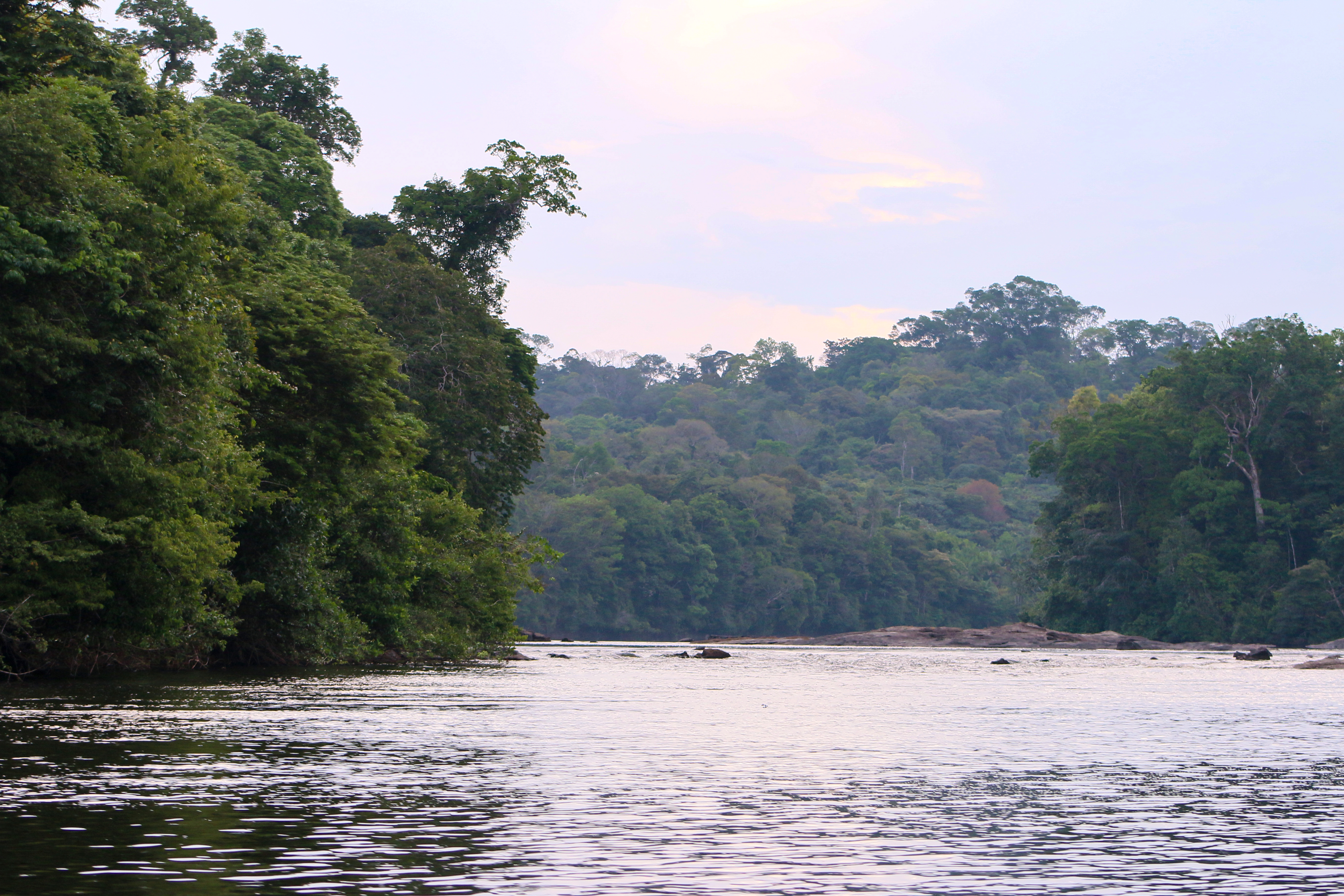

- Location within Brazil
- Coordinates: 1.338264°N 51.676673°W
- Area: 460,352.61 hectares (1,137,556.1 acres)
- Designation: National forest
- Created: 10 April 1989
- Administrator: Chico Mendes Institute for Biodiversity Conservation

The Amapá National Forest (Portuguese: Floresta Nacional do Amapá) is a national forest in the state of Amapá, Brazil. It supports sustainable exploitation of the natural resources in an area of Amazon rainforest in the Guiana Shield.

== Location ==
The Amapá National Forest is divided between the municipalities of Pracuúba (52.85%), Ferreira Gomes (44.07%) and Amapá (3.08%) in the state of Amapá. It has an area of 460,352.61 hectares (1,137,556.1 acres).

The forest is bounded to the north by the small Mutum River, to the east by the Falsino River, to the west by the Araguari River, and to the south by the confluence of the Falsino and Araguari. In the extreme north there are chains of mountains of significant height, thought to belong to the Tumucumaque complex. To the east it adjoins the 2,369,400 hectares (5,855,000 acres) Amapá State Forest, a sustainable use environmental unit created in 2006. To the northwest it adjoins the Montanhas do Tumucumaque National Park.

== Environment ==
The Amapá National Forest is in the Amazon biome. It contains a large area of humid tropical forest, mostly terra firma. It is accessible only by one viable waterway, the Araguari, from the municipality of Porto Grande. Vegetation includes imposing Amazon species such as Dinizia excelsa, Manilkara huberi, Vouacapoua americana and Caryocar villosum. Common palms are Euterpe oleracea (açaí) and Iriartea exorrhiza.

== History ==
The Amapá National Forest was created by presidential decree 97.630 of 10 April 1989. It is administered by Chico Mendes Institute for Biodiversity Conservation. It is classed as IUCN protected area category VI (protected area with sustainable use of natural resources). The objective is to support sustainable multiple use of forest resources and scientific research, with emphasis on methods for sustainable exploitation of native forests. It is part of the Amapá Biodiversity Corridor, created in 2003. The advisory council was established by ordnance 100 on 12 December 2008. The management plan was approved on 9 January 2014.

== Tourism ==
It is possible to visit Amapá National Florest mainly by the Araguari river, in cite of Porto Grande. The main attractions are its rivers, rapids and forests, in addition to the population living in this region and its culture. The local riverine population receive tourists, to know the rivers, the trails, their houses and their traditional activities. Every visit is necessarily by boat, as this Protected Area is surrounded by rivers. In addition, as it is on the other side of the river, the Amapá State Forest is also visited.

Amapá National Forest is one of the few Federal Conservation Units that allows sport fishing, but only on the Araguari River.

== Sources ==
- Corredor de Biodiversidade do Amapá Biodiversity Corridor (PDF), Belém: CI-Brasil, Governo do Amapá, Fundação Lee & Gund, 2007
- FES do Amapá (in Portuguese), ISA: Instituto Socioambiental
- Flona do Amapá (in Portuguese), Chico Mendes Institute for Biodiversity Conservation
- FLONA do Amapá (in Portuguese), ISA: Instituto Socioambiental
- Unidade de Conservação: Floresta Nacional de Amapá (in Portuguese), MMA: Ministério do Meio Ambiente
