= Maracá-Jipioca Ecological Station =

Ecological Station

- Estação ecológica de Maracá-Jipioca
- IUCN category Ia (strict nature reserve)
- Location within Brazil
- Nearest city: Amapá
- Coordinates: 2°01′37″N 50°25′26″W
- Area: 60,253 hectares (148,890 acres)
- Designation: Ecological station
- Created: 2 June 1981

Maracá-Jipioca Ecological Station (Portuguese: Estação ecológica de Maracá-Jipioca) is an ecological station covering two islands about 5 kilometres (3.1 mi) offshore from Amapá, a municipality in Amapá state, Brazil. It protects an area of coastal mangroves and tropical rainforest.

== Location ==
The ecological station is located on the adjacent islands Ilha de Maracá do Norte and Ilha de Maracá do Sul off the coast of Amapá, with an area of about 602 square kilometres (232 sq mi). The reserve was created by decree of 2 June 1981 with the objective of preserving significant samples of the original coastal marine environment influenced by the Amazon river. It is part of the Amazon biosphere. It is managed by the Chico Mendes Institute for Biodiversity Conservation. The reserve is in the Amapá municipality of Amapá state. It is part of the Amapá Biodiversity Corridor, created in 2003.

== Environment ==
The terrain is extremely flat, with maximum elevation of 3 metres (9.8 ft). Average annual rainfall is 5,000 millimetres (200 in) Temperatures range from 20 to 33 °C (68 to 91 °F) with an average of 26 °C (79 °F). The climate is a tropical monsoon climate (Am) with moderate to little rainfall from August to November and heavy to extremely heavy rainfall in the remaining months.

Climate data for Macará-Jipioca Ecological Station
Month	Jan	Feb	Mar	Apr	May	Jun	Jul	Aug	Sep	Oct	Nov	Dec	Year
Mean daily maximum °C (°F)	28 (82)	27 (81)	27 (81)	27 (81)	28 (82)	28 (82)	29 (84)	31 (88)	32 (90)	33 (91)	32 (90)	30 (86)	29 (85)
Mean daily minimum °C (°F)	22 (72)	22 (72)	22 (72)	22 (72)	22 (72)	22 (72)	21 (70)	21 (70)	21 (70)	20 (68)	21 (70)	21 (70)	21 (71)
Average rainfall mm (inches)	603.6 (23.76)	607.6 (23.92)	729.4 (28.72)	660.8 (26.02)	652.9 (25.70)	289.1 (11.38)	155.7 (6.13)	77.4 (3.05)	41.8 (1.65)	25.7 (1.01)	65.3 (2.57)	313.0 (12.32)	4,222.3 (166.23)

The shoreline and stream banks are dominated by mangroves, with typical floodplain species of trees in the more elevated areas. The coastal vegetation is in the Amapá mangroves ecoregion.

Due to the difficulty of motorized access the unit has excellent biodiversity with many species, some of them endangered. The reserve is used by many migratory birds including American flamingo (Phoenicopterus ruber), American yellow warbler (Setophaga petechia), laughing gull (Leucophaeus atricilla), semipalmated plover (Charadrius semipalmatus), greater yellowlegs (Tringa melanoleuca), osprey (Pandion haliaetus), spotted sandpiper (Actitis macularius), peregrine falcon (Falco peregrinus), ruddy turnstone (Arenaria interpres), sanderling (Calidris alba), semipalmated sandpiper (Calidris pusilla), least tern (Sternula antillarum), common tern (Sterna hirundo), yellow-billed cuckoo (Coccyzus americanus), black-billed cuckoo (Coccyzus erythropthalmus) and barn swallow (Hirundo rustica).

== Conservation ==
The Ecological Station is a "strict nature reserve" under IUCN protected area category Ia. The purpose is to conserve significant samples of pioneer formations in the coastal marine environment influenced by the Amazon River. The conservation unit is supported by the Amazon Region Protected Areas Program.

== Sources ==
- Corredor de Biodiversidade do Amapá Biodiversity Corridor (PDF), Belém: CI-Brasil, Governo do Amapá, Fundação Lee & Gund, 2007
- Estação ecológica de Maracá-Jipioca, MMA: Ministerio do Meio Ambiente
- Full list: PAs supported by ARPA, ARPA
- Unidade de Conservação: Estação ecológica de Maracá-Jipioca (in Portuguese), MMA: Ministério do Meio Ambiente
