= BR-210 (Brazil highway) =

Highway in Brazil

BR-210
- Perimetral Norte
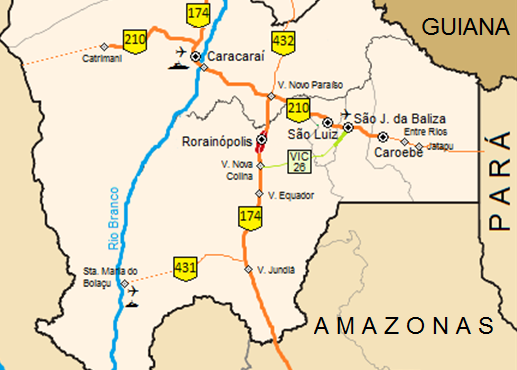
- BR-210 and other main highways in Roraima

Route information
- Length: 2,454.7 km (1,525.3 mi)

Major junctions
- East end: Macapá, Amapá; BR-156 Porto Grande; Pedra Branca do Amapari; Serra do Navio; Jakare, Amapá; Caroebe, Roraima; São João da Baliza; São Luiz; BR-174 Rorainópolis; Caracaraí; BR-174 Iracema; Boa Esperança, Roraima
- West end: São Gabriel da Cachoeira, Amazonas

Location
- Country: Brazil

Highway system
- Highways in Brazil; Federal

BR-210 is a federal highway of Brazil. The 411.7-kilometre road, popularly known as Perimetral Norte ("north perimeter"), is primarily located in the Northern Brazilian state of Roraima, with other segments in Amazonas, Pará, and Amapá.

The highway was planned to connect Macapá, Amapá with the Brazil-Colombia border in the municipality of São Gabriel da Cachoeira, Amazonas. The highway was intended to be 2,454.7 km (1,525.3 mi) in total. However, only small stretches of it have been implemented. In 1976, the highway entered the Wajãpi Indigenous Territory in Amapá. The invasion was repelled by the indigenous leadership who expelled the intruders between the 1980s and the 1990s, and therefore, the highway will probably never be completely built.
