= Pedra Branca do Amapari =

Municipality in Amapá, Brazil

Pedra Branca do Amapari Amapari
- Municipality
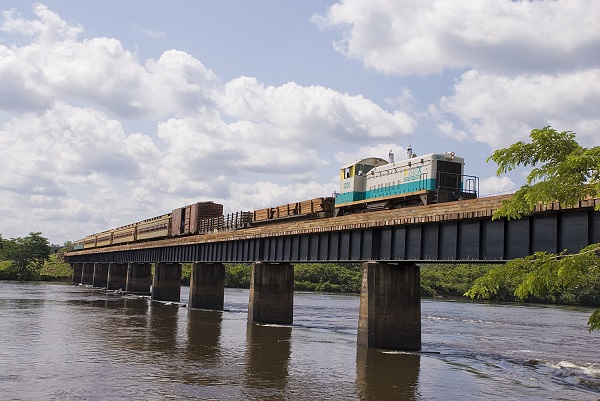
- Railway bridge over the Amapari River

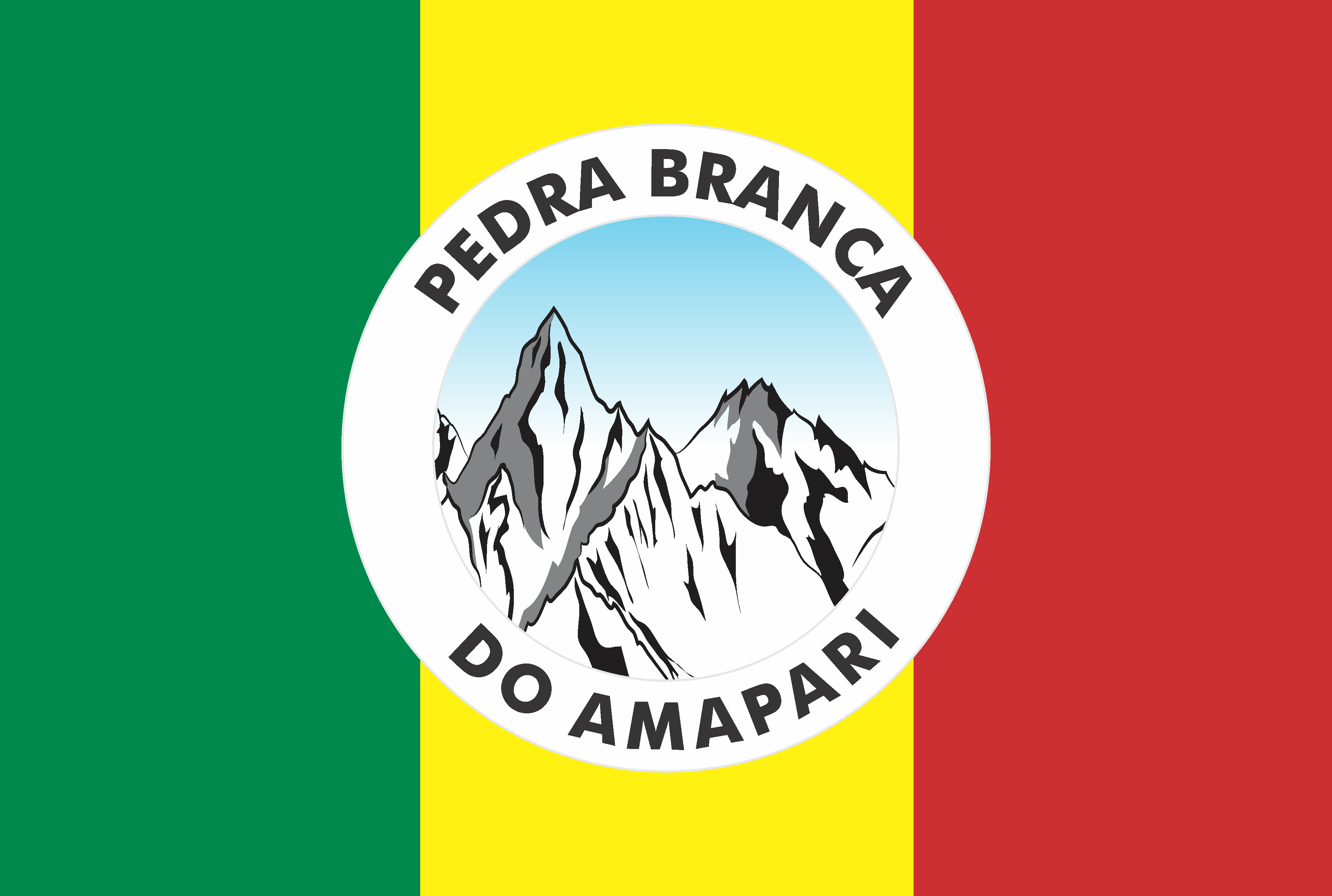
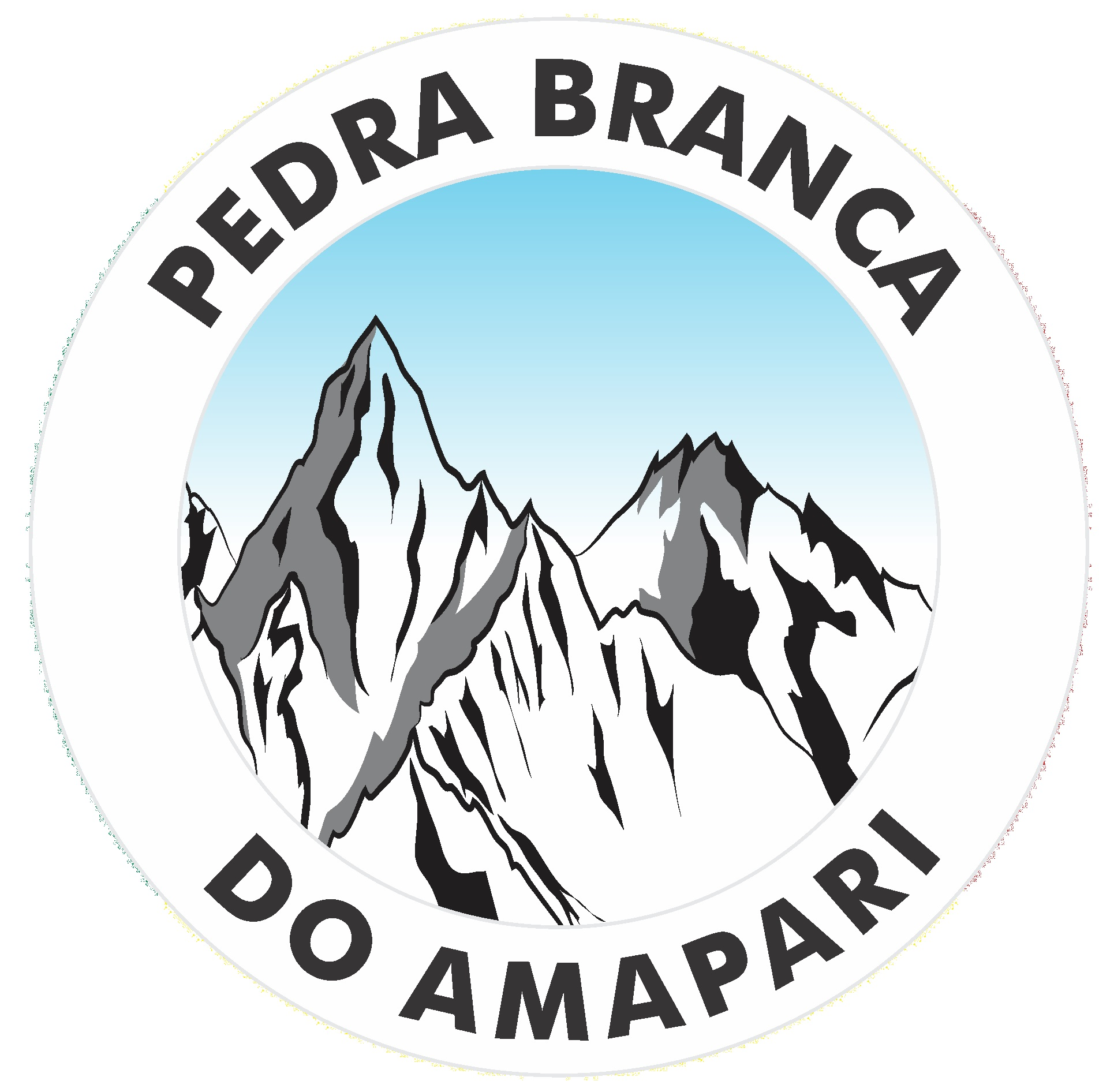
- Flag Seal

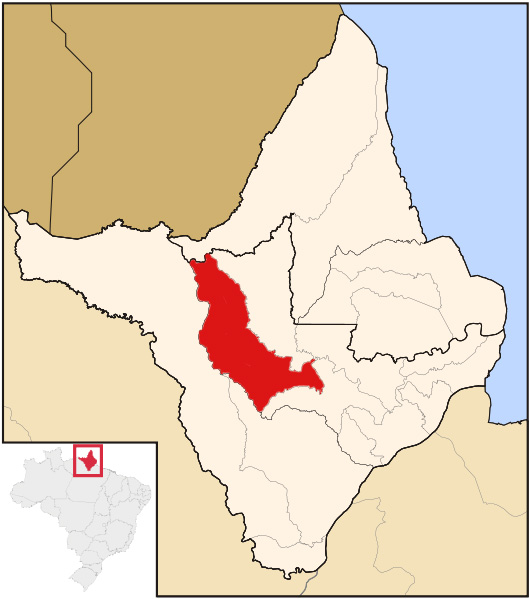
- Location of Pedra Branca do Amapari in the Amapá

- Location in Brazil
- Coordinates: 0.7761°N 51.9564°W
- Country: Brazil
- Region: North
- State: Amapá
- Founded: 1 May 1992

Government
  - Mayor: Beth Pelaes (PMDB)

Area
  - Total: 9,495 km^{2} (3,666 sq mi)

Population (2020)
  - Total: 17,067
  - Density: 1.13/km^{2} (2.9/sq mi)
- Time zone: UTC-3

Pedra Branca do Amapari (Brazilian Portuguese: [ˈpɛdɾɐ ˈbɾɐ̃kɐ du ɐmapaˈɾi]; 'White Stone of Amapari'), also known simply as Amapari, is a municipality located in the midwest of the state of Amapá, Brazil. Its population is 17,067, with an area of 9,495 square kilometres (3,666 mi^{2}). The municipality has a population density of 1.13/km2, and the population remains evenly divided between rural and village areas.

== Geography ==
Pedra Branca do Amapari is bordered by the municipalities of Oiapoque to the north, Serra do Navio to the east, Porto Grande to the southeast, Mazagão to the south, and Laranjal do Jari to the west. The town is rich in rivers and streams (igarapé). The Amapari River and its tributaries, the Mururé, Tucumpi and Cupixi, all cross through the municipality. The Amapari River feeds in to the Araguari River in the southwest of the town. The municipality contains 12% of the 806,184-hectare (1,992,120-acre) Rio Iratapuru Sustainable Development Reserve, created in 1997. It contains 6.39% of the 2,369,400-hectare (5,855,000-acre) Amapá State Forest, a sustainable use conservation unit established in 2006.

== History ==
The municipality of Amapari was originally explored by members of the Saramaka, a Maroon group from Suriname, who searched for gold in the area. Manganese ore was discovered in the region in 1953. Travel to Pedra Branca do Amapari was possible only by airplane, and pilots used a huge white rock (pedra branca) in the Amapari River as a reference point. Thereafter the town was known as Pedra Branca do Amapari. The town can nowadays be accessed via the BR-210 highway.

== Economy ==
Amapari supports the small-scale production of rice, corn, beans, and cassava for the domestic market. Cupuaçu, pineapples, oranges, bananas, and melons are grown for local consumption. Per capital income in Amapari is R$ 24,782 (US$9629), as compared to the Brazilian national average of R$20,988 (US$12,536).

Gold mining has become a major part of the economy, and resulted in a steep population growth. The biggest concession is the Tucano mine which is operated by Great Panther Mining.
