= List of municipalities in Amapá =

This is a list of the municipalities in the state of Amapá (AP), located in the North Region of Brazil. Amapá is divided into 16 municipalities.

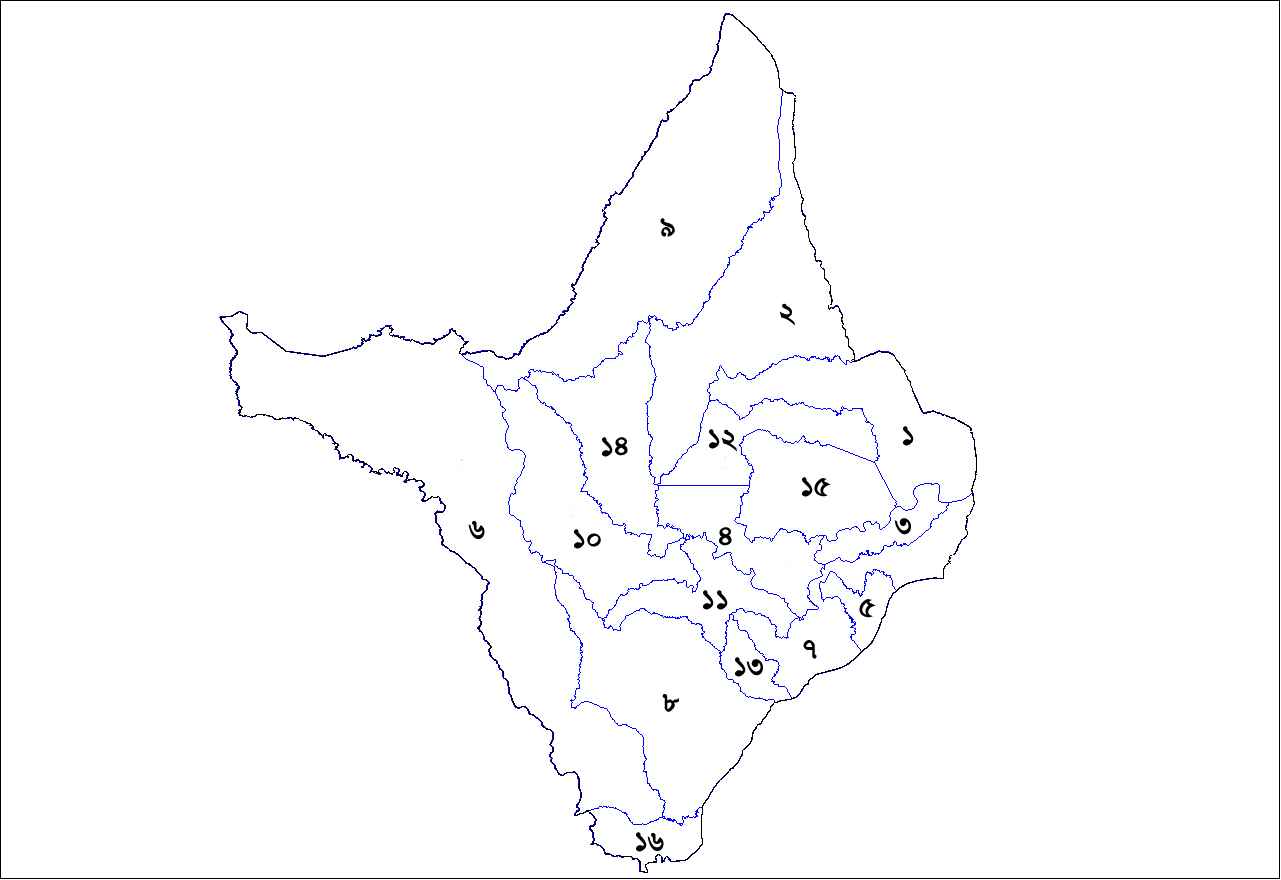
Municipalities of Amapa, Brazil

== Municipalities ==
† State capital

Municipalities in Amapá
| Name | Immediate region | Intermediate region | Population (2022 census) | Population (2010 census) | Population change | Land area (km²) | Population density (2022) |
|---|---|---|---|---|---|---|---|
| Amapá | Oiapoque | Oiapoque-Porto Grande | 7,943 | 8,069 | −1.6% | 9,175.9 | 0.9/km^{2} |
| Calçoene | Oiapoque | Oiapoque-Porto Grande | 10,612 | 9,000 | +17.9% | 14,269.3 | 0.7/km^{2} |
| Cutias | Oiapoque | Oiapoque-Porto Grande | 4,461 | 4,696 | −5.0% | 2,114.2 | 2.1/km^{2} |
| Ferreira Gomes | Porto Grande | Oiapoque-Porto Grande | 6,666 | 5,802 | +14.9% | 5,046.2 | 1.3/km^{2} |
| Itaubal | Macapá | Macapá | 5,599 | 4,265 | +31.3% | 1,704.0 | 3.3/km^{2} |
| Laranjal do Jari | Laranjal do Jari | Macapá | 35,114 | 39,942 | −12.1% | 30,971.8 | 1.1/km^{2} |
| Macapá† | Macapá | Macapá | 442,933 | 398,204 | +11.2% | 6,408.5 | 69.1/km^{2} |
| Mazagão | Macapá | Macapá | 21,924 | 17,032 | +28.7% | 13,130.9 | 1.7/km^{2} |
| Oiapoque | Oiapoque | Oiapoque-Porto Grande | 27,482 | 20,509 | +34.0% | 22,625.1 | 1.2/km^{2} |
| Pedra Branca do Amapari | Porto Grande | Oiapoque-Porto Grande | 12,847 | 10,772 | +19.3% | 9,495.5 | 1.4/km^{2} |
| Porto Grande | Porto Grande | Oiapoque-Porto Grande | 17,848 | 16,809 | +6.2% | 4,401.8 | 4.1/km^{2} |
| Pracuúba | Oiapoque | Oiapoque-Porto Grande | 3,803 | 3,793 | +0.3% | 4,956.5 | 0.8/km^{2} |
| Santana | Macapá | Macapá | 107,618 | 101,262 | +6.3% | 1,579.6 | 68.1/km^{2} |
| Serra do Navio | Porto Grande | Oiapoque-Porto Grande | 4,673 | 4,380 | +6.7% | 7,756.1 | 0.6/km^{2} |
| Tartarugalzinho | Oiapoque | Oiapoque-Porto Grande | 12,945 | 12,563 | +3.0% | 6,709.6 | 1.9/km^{2} |
| Vitória do Jari | Laranjal do Jari | Macapá | 11,291 | 12,428 | −9.1% | 2,482.9 | 4.5/km^{2} |
| Amapá | — | — | 733,759 | 669,526 | +9.59% | 142,827.9 | 5.1/km^{2} |
| North Region | — | — | 17,354,884 | 15,864,454 | +9.39% | 3,853,575.6 | 4.5/km^{2} |
| Brazil | — | — | 203,080,756 | 190,755,799 | +6.46% | 8,502,728.3 | 23.9/km^{2} |

== See also ==
- Geography of Brazil
- List of cities in Brazil
