= Amapá State Forest =

- Floresta Estadual do Amapá
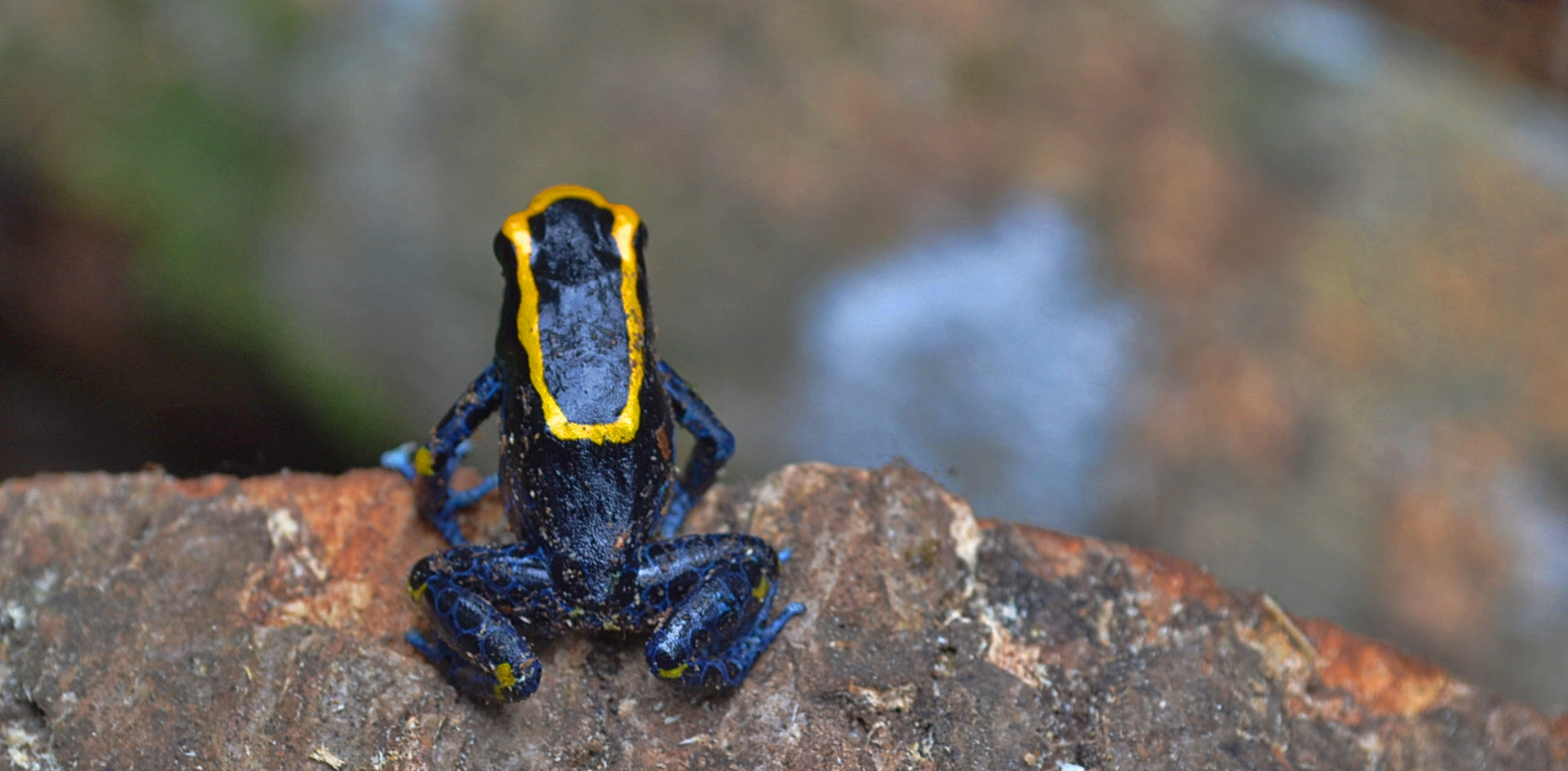
- Dendrobates tinctorius in Amapá State Forest

- Location within Brazil
- Nearest city: Oiapoque
- Coordinates: 2.010512°N 51.279438°W
- Area: 2,369,400 hectares (5,855,000 acres)
- Designation: State forest
- Created: 12 July 2006
- Administrator: Secretaria de Estado do Meio Ambiente do Amapá

The Amapá State Forest (Portuguese: Floresta Estadual do Amapá) is a state forest in the state of Amapá, Brazil.

== Location ==
The Amapá State Forest is divided between the municipalities of Tartarugalzinho (7.64%), Pracuúba (4.52%), Porto Grande (7.72%), Oiapoque (24.15%), Mazagão (8.56%), Ferreira Gomes (3.64%), Calçoene (23.23%), Pedra Branca do Amaparí (6.39%), Amapá (6.32%) and Serra do Navio (7.83%). To the west it adjoins the Tumucumaque Mountains National Park and the Amapá National Forest. In the north east it adjoins the Cape Orange National Park. It has an area of 2,369,400 hectares (5,855,000 acres). It covers 16.5% of the state, bringing protected parts of Amapá to 63.5% of the territory. It is part of the Amapá Ecological Corridor.

== History ==
The forest originated in a 2004 proposal by president Luiz Inácio Lula da Silva to transfer federals lands to the state if they were transformed into a protected area. The Amapá Legislature approved creation unanimously in 2006. The Amapá State Forest was created under Amapá governor Waldez Góes by law 1.028 of 12 July 2006 for sustainable exploitation of renewable and non-renewable natural resources, to maintain biodiversity and other ecological attributes and a socially just and economically viable form. It covered a discontinuous area estimated as 23,694 square kilometres (9,148 sq mi).

Decree 6.291 of 7 December 2007 transferred federal land within the state forest to the state of Amapá for sustainable use. When governor Camilo Capiberibe began implementation some of the legislators led by Eider Pena began to oppose the forest, saying that it would affect small producers in the area. Ordnance 657 of 19 November 2013 set up an executive group to clarify the boundaries with 17 INCRA settlement projects. The timber in these projects is being depleted, replaced by soybean farms. In February 2014 a motion to repeal the forest was defeated after it was pointed out that if this were done the land would revert to federal ownership.

== Sources ==
- Daniele Bragança (17 February 2014), "Adiada votação que pode extinguir Floresta Estadual do Amapá", O Eco (in Portuguese)
- FES do Amapá (in Portuguese), ISA: Instituto Socioambiental
