= Pracuúba =

Municipality in Amapá, Brazil

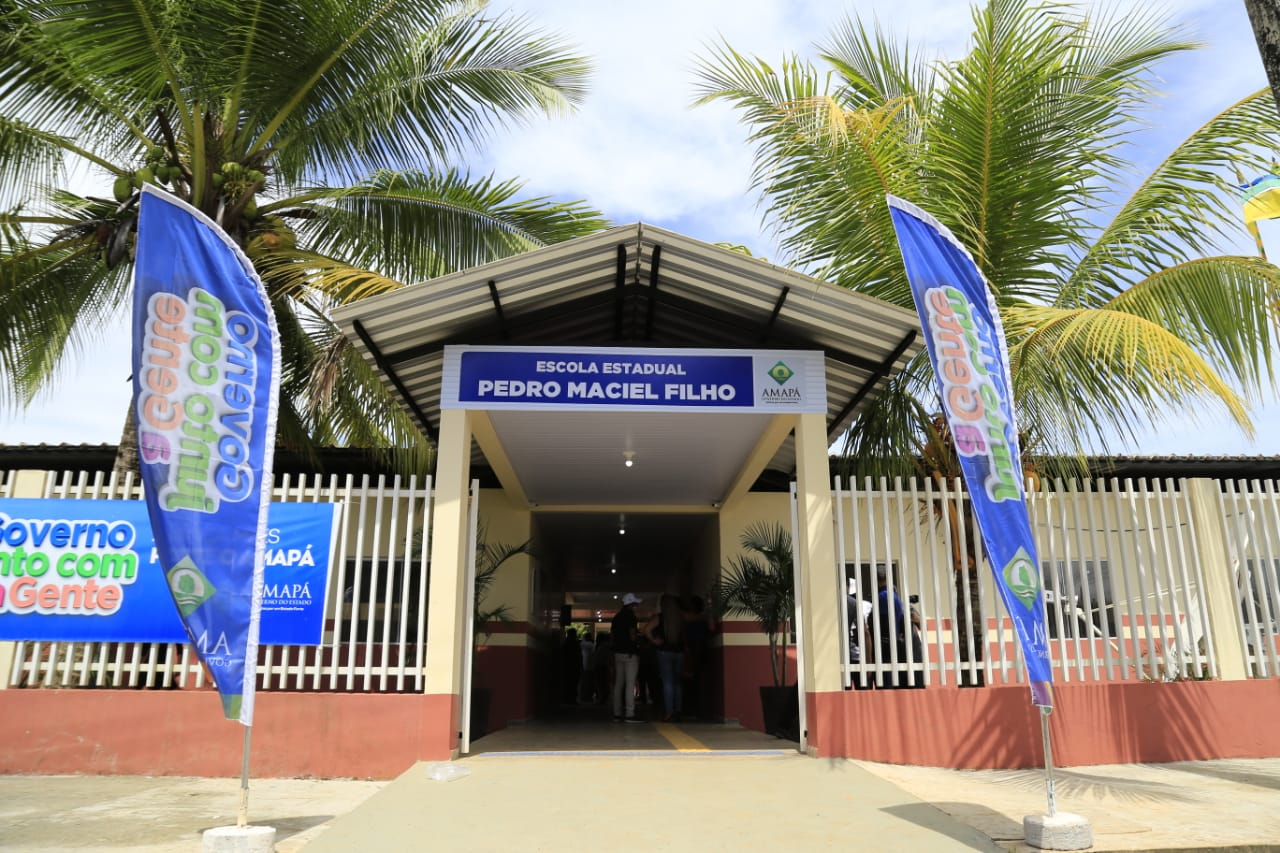
- Pedro Maciel Filho School in Cujubim, Pracuúba

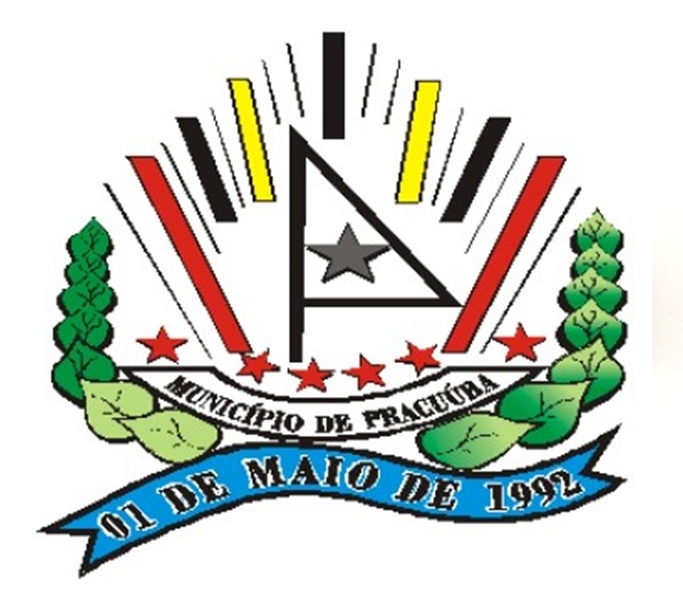
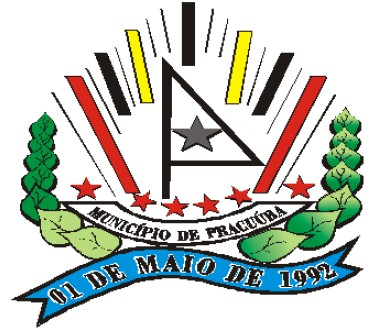
- Flag Coat of arms

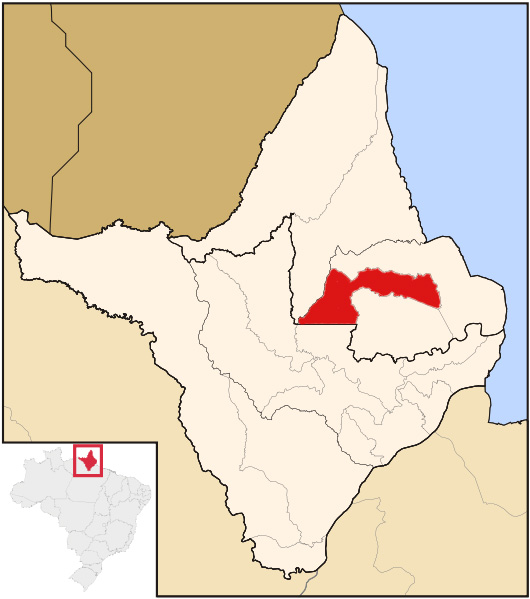
- Location of Pracuúba in Amapá
- Coordinates: 01°44′37″N 50°47′04″W
- Country: Brazil
- Region: North
- State: Amapá
- Established: May 1, 1992

Government
  - Mayor: Belize Conceição Costa Ramos (PR)

Area
  - Total: 4,957 km^{2} (1,914 sq mi)

Population (2020)
  - Total: 5,246
- Time zone: UTC−3 (BRT)

Pracuúba (Brazilian Portuguese pronunciation: [pɾakuˈubɐ]) is a municipality located in the mideast of the state of Amapá, Brazil. It became an independent municipality in 1992. The town is located 235 kilometres (146 mi) from the state capitol of Macapá and can be accessed from the BR-156 highway.

== Geography ==
The population of Pracuúba is 5,246 and its area is 4,957 square kilometres (1,914 mi^{2}).. The name of the municipality comes from a tree common to the area known as the pracuubeira. The economy of Pracuúba relies of artisanal fishing and raising livestock, primarily buffalo. It also produces timber and açaí.

The municipality contains part of the 392,469-hectare (969,810-acre) Lago Piratuba Biological Reserve, a fully protected conservation unit created in 1980. It also contains 4.52% of the 2,369,400-hectare (5,855,000-acre) Amapá State Forest, a sustainable use conservation unit established in 2006. It contains 52.85% of the 460,353-hectare (1,137,560-acre) Amapá National Forest, a sustainable use conservation unit created in 1989.

== Cujubim ==
Cujubim is an agricultural village located in the municipality. Pedro Maciel Filho, a native of Cujubim, wanted a school in his village where agricultural techniques were taught. Filho donated land on which the school could be constructed. On 9 January 2021, the Pedro Maciel Filho School was opened in Cujubim.

== See also ==
- List of municipalities in Amapá
