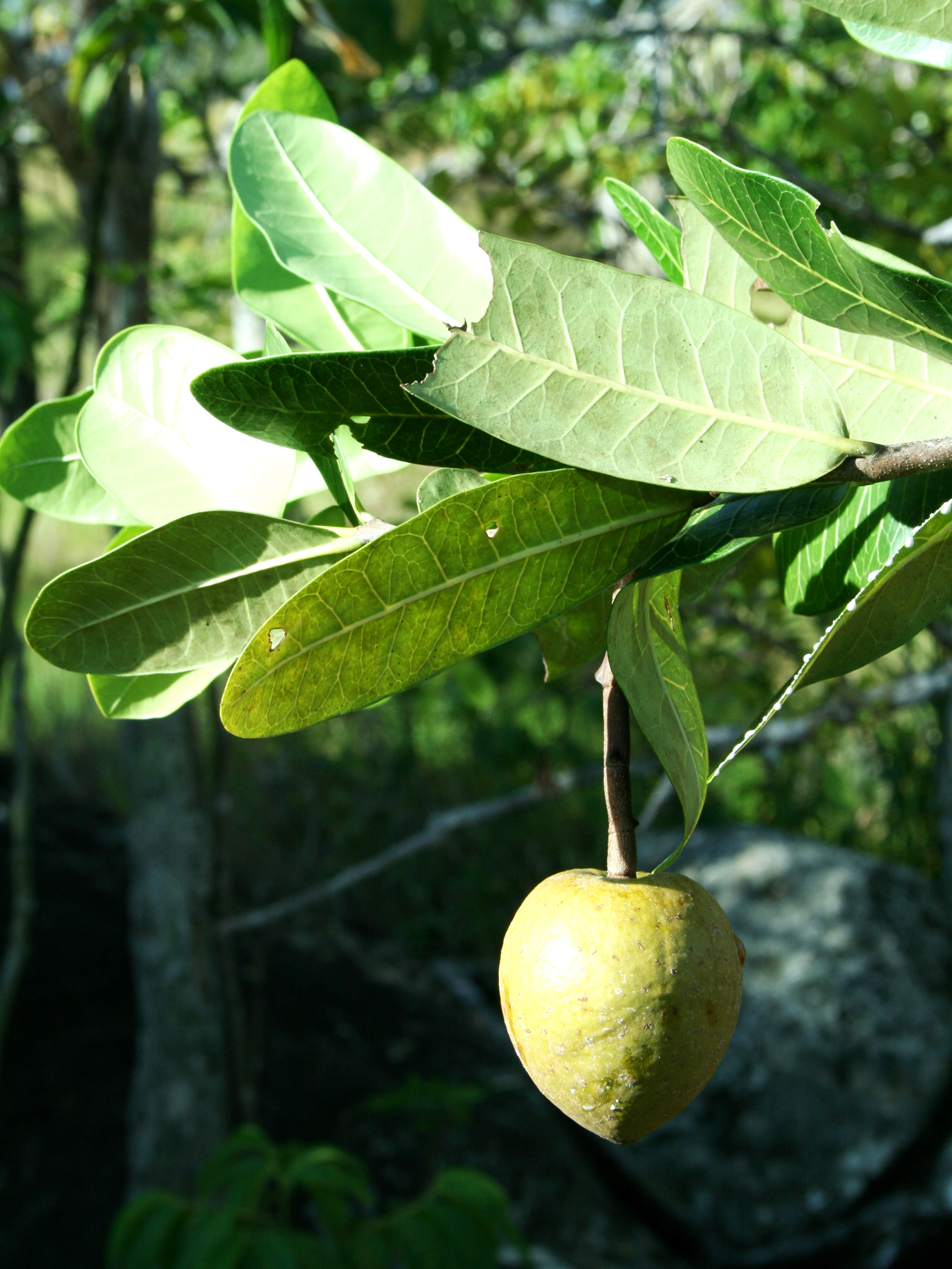
- Fruit of Parahancornia surrogata

Scientific classification
- Kingdom: Plantae
- Clade: Tracheophytes
- Clade: Angiosperms
- Clade: Eudicots
- Clade: Asterids
- Order: Gentianales
- Family: Apocynaceae
- Subfamily: Rauvolfioideae
- Tribe: Willughbeieae
- Subtribe: Lacmelleinae
- Genus: Parahancornia; Ducke

Species
- See text

= Parahancornia =

Genus of plants

Parahancornia is a genus of flowering plants in the family Apocynaceae, first described as a genus in 1922. It is native to South America.

== Species ==
The following species are currently recognized under Parahancornia:

- Parahancornia amara (Markgr.) Monach. - Amazonas State in Brazil
- Parahancornia fasciculata (Poir.) Benoist - Colombia, Venezuela, 3 Guianas, N Brazil, Peru, Bolivia
- Parahancornia krukovii Monach. - Amazonas State in Brazil
- Parahancornia negroensis Monach. - Amazonas State in Brazil, Amazonas State in Venezuela
- Parahancornia oblonga (Benth. ex Mull. Arg.) Monach. - Amazon Basin
- Parahancornia peruviana Monach. - Peru
- Parahancornia surrogata Zarucchi - Amazon Basin
