= Porto Grande =

Municipality in Amapá, Brazil

- Municipality
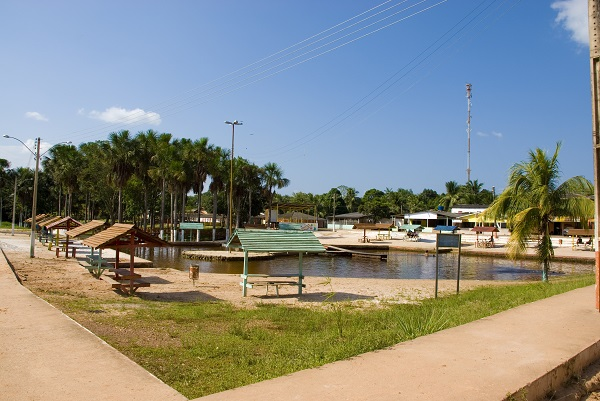
- Harbour at Porto Grande

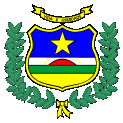
- Flag Coat of arms

- Location in Amapá state

- Location in Brazil
- Coordinates: 00°42′46″N 51°24′46″W
- Country: Brazil
- Region: North
- State: Amapá

Government
  - Mayor: Jose Maria Bessa de Oliveira (PDT)

Area
  - Total: 4,425 km^{2} (1,709 sq mi)

Population (2020)
  - Total: 22,452
  - Density: 5.074/km^{2} (13.14/sq mi)
- Time zone: UTC-03:00 (BRT)
- Postal code: 68980-000
- Website: www.portogrande.ap.gov.br

Porto Grande (pronounced [ˈpoʁtu ˈɡɾɐ̃dʒi]; Portuguese for 'Grand Harbor') is a municipality located in the southeast of the state of Amapá, Brazil. Its population is 22,452 and its area is 4,425 km^{2}.

== Overview ==
Porto Grande became an independent municipality in 1993.

The area around Porto Grande was first explored by gold miners, however nowadays it has become one of the biggest food producers in Amapá. It is a poor region where many homes do not have sewage system, and a quarter of the population does not have access to clean drinking water, however Porto Grande has one of the lowest illiteracy rates of Brazil.

The Annual Pineapple Festival in September is a popular tourist attraction. Other attractions are the spa near the Araguari River. As of 2021, a regional hospital was being constructed in Porto Grande.

== Geography ==
It has a tropical rainforest climate with a short dry season.

The municipality contains 7.72% of the 2,369,400-hectare (5,855,000-acre) Amapá State Forest, a sustainable use conservation unit established in 2006.

== Economy ==
Porto Grande is a major fruit producer in particular pineapples and oranges. Other economic activities are livestock like cattle, buffalo and pig, palm oil and pine plantations.

== Transport ==
Porto Grande is connected to the BR-156, and the BR-210 highways.

== Neighboring municipalities ==
- Ferreira Gomes, north and northeast
- Macapá, southeast
- Santana, southeast
- Mazagão, southwest
- Pedra Branca do Amapari, northeast
- Serra do Navio, northwest
