= Cape Orange National Park =

National park in Amapá, Brazil

- Parque Nacional do Cabo Orange
- IUCN category II (national park)
- Oiapoque River

- Location within Brazil
- Nearest city: Macapá, Amapá
- Coordinates: 3.704°N 51.406°W
- Area: 657,318 hectares (1,624,270 acres)
- Designation: National park
- Created: 15 July 1980
- Administrator: ICMBio

Ramsar Wetland
- Designated: 2 February 2013
- Reference no.: 2190

The Cape Orange National Park (Portuguese: Parque Nacional do Cabo Orange) is a National park located in Amapá state in the north of Brazil, near the border between Brazil and French Guiana.

== Location ==
The Cape Orange National Park has an area of 657,318 hectares (1,624,270 acres). It covers parts of the municipalities of Calçoene and Oiapoque. To the southwest the park adjoins the 2,369,400 hectares (5,855,000 acres) Amapá State Forest, a sustainable use conservation unit established in 2006.

The Park is significant because it is situated on the coastline of Brazil; the only one in the rainforest that enjoys such a location. This means that the faunal and floral species found here are quite different from those of the areas situated further inland. The park is accessible by boat and provides a fascinating look at the very different ecosystems of the coast and the jungle, juxtaposed with one another. The Cape Orange National Park covers varied ecosystems, examples of which are mangroves, natural fields, fluvial marine forests, floodable areas, and terra firm, besides rich fauna.

The natural beauties, rather well preserved and with evident tourist appeal – the case of the Cassiporé, Cunani, Uaçá, and Oiapoque – allow for boat, canoe, and launch trips and the practice of rafting. The vast biodiversity makes possible visitation for contemplating vegetal and animal species, above all birds, in addition to projects of environmental education and scientific research (main objectives of the national parks).

== History ==
The Cape Orange National Park was created by decree 84.913 of 15 July 1980 with the objective of protecting flora, fauna and natural beauty. It is administered by the Chico Mendes Institute for Biodiversity Conservation (ICMBio). The consultative council was created by IBAMA on 9 March 2006. The management plan was approved on 17 January 2011. On 22 March 2012 ICMBio and the Oiapoque fishermen came to an agreement mediated by the Federal Public Ministry over fishing in the park's waters. On 2013, the government of Brazil has named it the 12th Wetland of International Importance, under Ramsar Convention.

== Conservation ==
The park is classified as IUCN protected-area category II (national park). The basic objective is the preservation of natural ecosystems of great ecological relevance and scenic beauty. This enables the conduct of scientific research, the development of educational activities and environmental interpretation, recreation in contact with nature and eco-tourism. It is part of the Amapá Biodiversity Corridor, created in 2003. The park is supported by the Amazon Region Protected Areas Program.

Protected species in the park include the giant armadillo (Priodontes maximus), giant anteater (Myrmecophaga tridactyla), jaguar (Panthera onca), oncilla (Leopardus tigrinus), black bearded saki (Chiropotes satanas), green sea turtle (Chelonia mydas), smalltooth sawfish (Pristis pectinata), West Indian manatee (Trichechus manatus) and Amazonian manatee (Trichechus inunguis).

== Sources ==
- Corredor de Biodiversidade do Amapá Biodiversity Corridor (PDF), Belém: CI-Brasil, Governo do Amapá, Fundação Lee & Gund, 2007, archived from the original (PDF) on 2019-04-14
- FES do Amapá (in Portuguese), ISA: Instituto Socioambiental
- Full list: PAs supported by ARPA, ARPA
- Parna do Cabo Orange (in Portuguese), Chico Mendes Institute for Biodiversity Conservation, archived from the original on 2016-03-19
- PARNA do Cabo Orange (in Portuguese), ISA: Instituto Socioambiental
- Unidade de Conservação: Parque Nacional do Cabo Orange (in Portuguese), MMA: Ministério do Meio Ambiente
