= Captaincy of Cabo de Norte =

Captaincy in Brazil from 1637 to 1693

The Captaincy of Cabo de Norte was a captaincy in Brazil which existed from 1637 until 1693. It was located in modern-day Amapá, including northern portions of the Amazon at the Paru River.

The captaincy of Cabo de Norte was granted by King Philip IV of Spain to Bento Maciel Parente in 1637 during the Iberian Union of Crowns.

The captaincy returned to the Portuguese Crown in 1693.
