= Tartarugalzinho =

Municipality in Amapá, Brazil

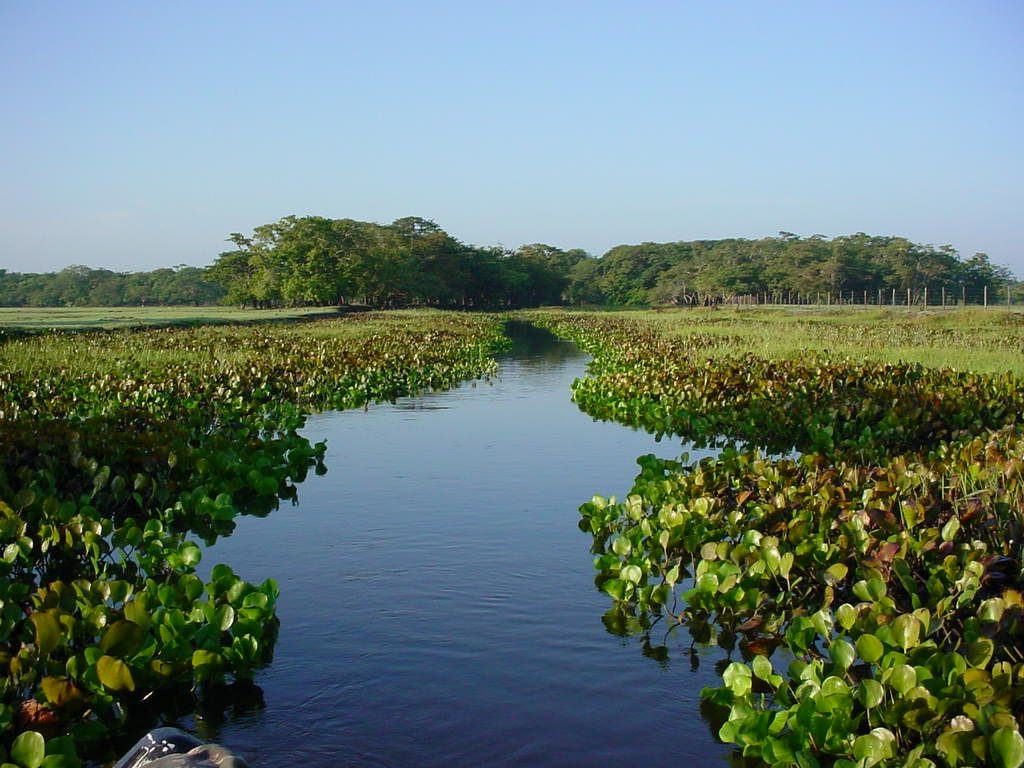
- Igarapé Euzébio, upstream from the Aporema River

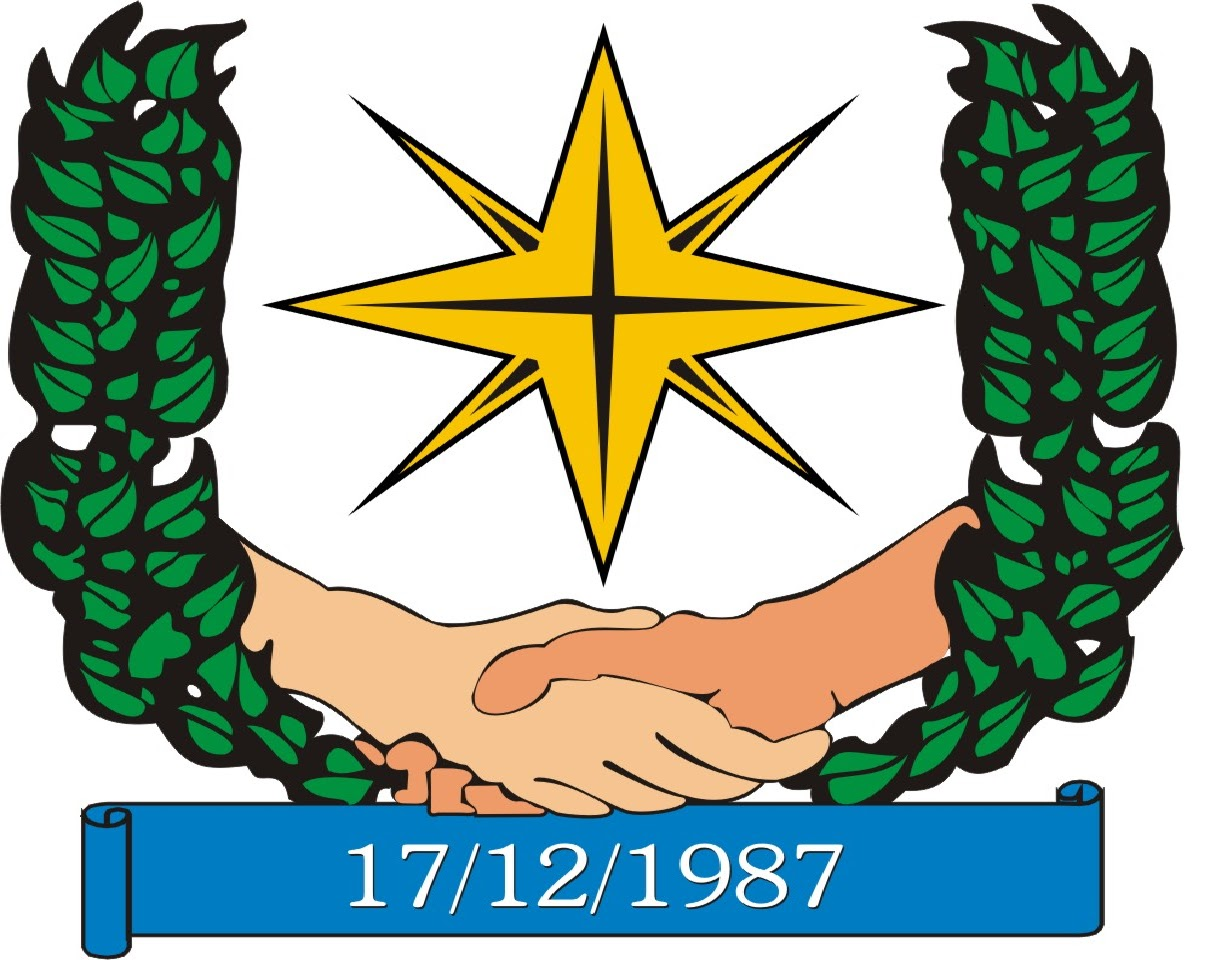
- Flag Coat of arms

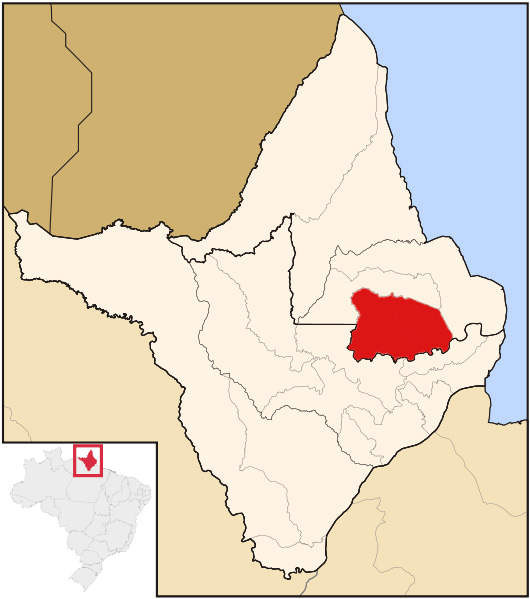
- Location of Tartarugalzinho in Amapá
- Coordinates: 01°30′21″N 50°54′43″W
- Country: Brazil
- Region: North
- State: Amapá
- Established: 17 December 1987

Government
  - Mayor: Rildo Oliveira (PMDB)

Area
  - Total: 6,712 km^{2} (2,592 sq mi)

Population (2020)
  - Total: 17,769
- Time zone: UTC−3 (BRT)

Tartarugalzinho (Brazilian Portuguese pronunciation: [taʁtaɾuɡawˈzĩɲu]) is a municipality located in the east of the state of Amapá, Brazil. Its population is 17,769 and its area is 6,712 square kilometres (2,592 mi^{2}). Tartarugalzinho is located 230 kilometres (140 mi) from the state capitol of Macapá. It was established as a municipality on 17 December 1987.

== Overview ==
The first settlement in the municipality was located on the Tartarugal Grande River, however the rapids made transport difficult, and the town was moved to a tributary. That town has become known as Tartarugalzinho.

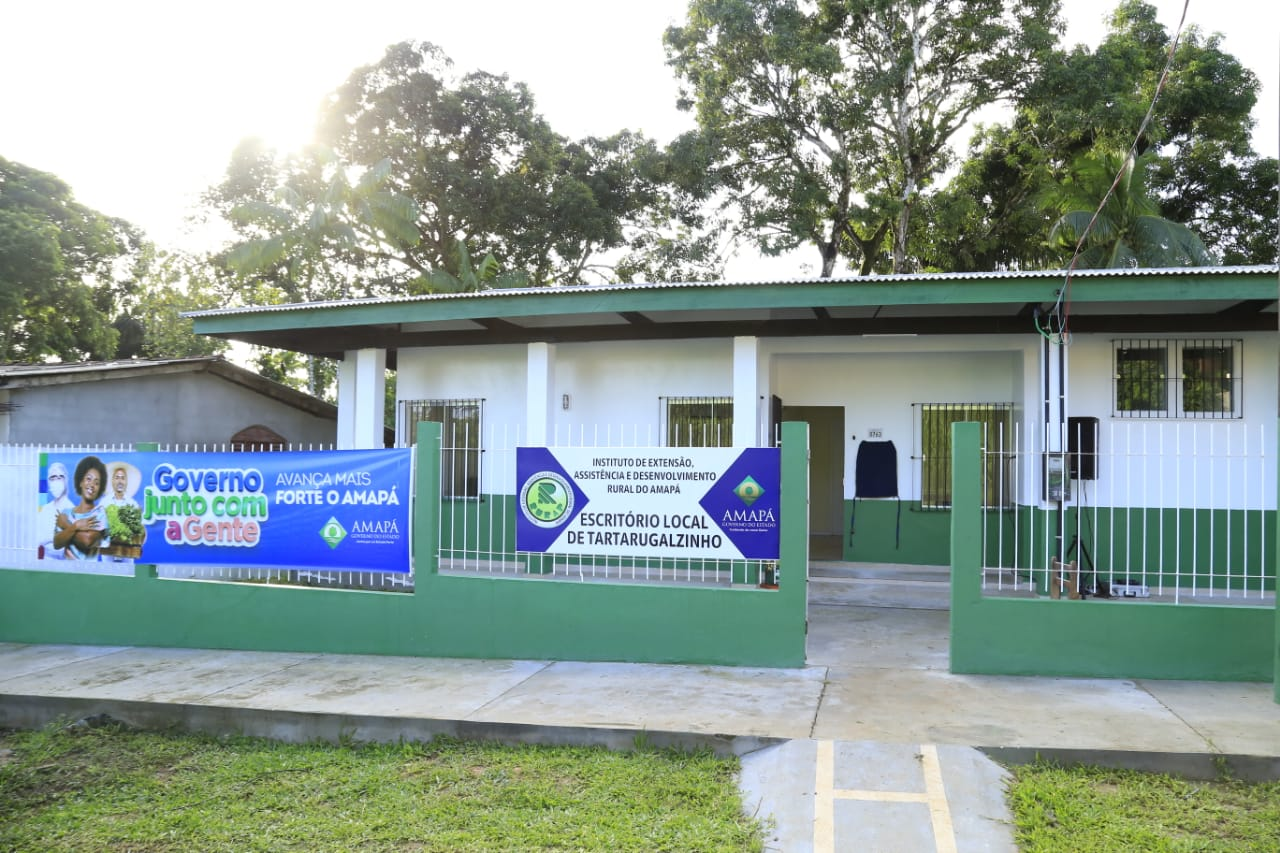
Agricultural school in Tartarugalzinho

The economy is based on raising livestock, primarily cattle and buffalo, subsistence farming and fishing. The discovery of gold in the area has caused a population surge. A major industry in the municipality is the Champion factory which turns eucalyptus seeds into pulp for the paper industry.

Bom Jesus dos Fernandes, an agricultural village, is located within the municipality.

== Geography ==
The municipality contains part of the 392,469-hectare (969,810-acre) Lago Piratuba Biological Reserve, a fully protected conservation unit created in 1980. It also contains 7.64% of the 2,369,400-hectare (5,855,000-acre) Amapá State Forest, a sustainable use conservation unit established in 2006.

== See also ==
- List of municipalities in Amapá
