= Ecological corridor (Brazil) =

An ecological corridor (Portuguese: Corredor ecológico) in Brazil is a collection of natural or semi-natural areas that link protected areas and allow gene flow between them.

== Definition ==
The National System of Conservation Units (SNUC) law recognises ecological corridors as portions of natural or semi-natural ecosystems linking protected areas that allow gene flow and movement of biota, recolonization of degraded areas and maintenance of viable populations larger than would be possible with individual units. The federal Ecological Corridor Project has its roots at least as far back as 1993. It has identified seven major corridors, with focus on implementing and learning from the Central Amazon Corridor and the Central Atlantic Forest Corridor.

== Examples ==
Corridor	Level	Area (ha)	Created
Amapá Biodiversity Corridor	State	10,476,117	2003
Trinational Biodiversity Corridor	Federal	570,000	Proposed
Caatinga Ecological Corridor	Federal	5,900,000	2006
Central Amazon Ecological Corridor	Federal	52,159,206	2002
Central Atlantic Forest Ecological Corridor	Federal	21,500,000	2002
Northern Amazon Ecological Corridor	Federal		Proposed
Santa Maria Ecological Corridor	Federal		2001
Capivara-Confusões Ecological Corridor	Federal	414,565	2005
Serra do Mar Ecological Corridor	Federal	12,600,000	2007
South Amazon Ecological Corridor	Federal		Proposed
South Amazon Ecotones Ecological Corridor	Federal		Proposed
Western Amazon Ecological Corridor	Federal		Proposed

== Sources ==
- Corredor ecológico (in Portuguese), ISA: Instituto Socioambiental
