= Amapá Biodiversity Corridor =

Ecological corridor in Amapá, Brazil

- Corredor de Biodiversidade do Amapá
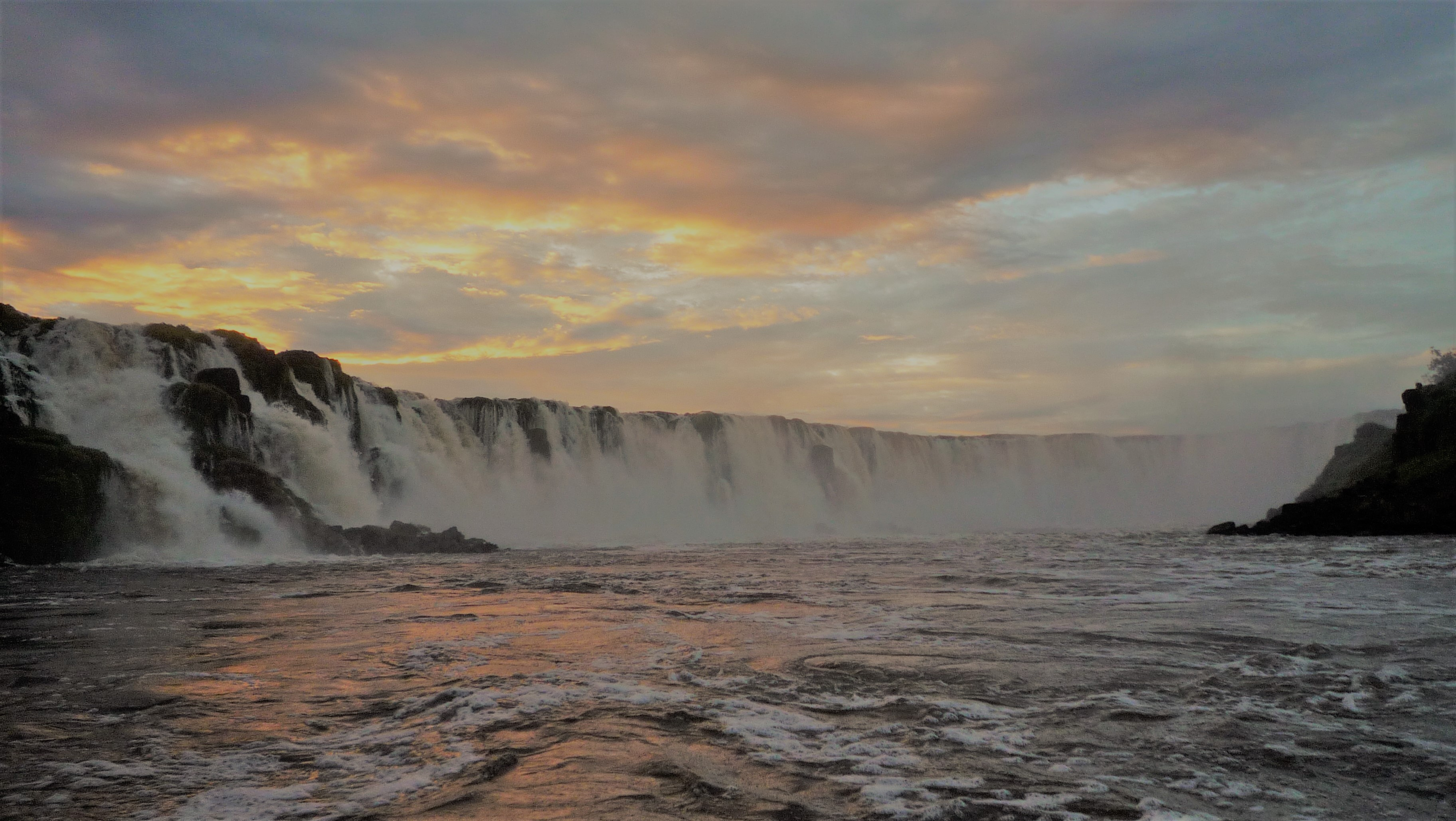
- Waterfalls in the Jari River

- Location within Brazil
- Nearest city: Macapá
- Coordinates: 0.317999°N 52.724326°W
- Area: 104,761.17 square kilometres (40,448.51 sq mi)
- Designation: Ecological corridor
- Created: 2003

The Amapá Biodiversity Corridor (Portuguese: Corredor de Biodiversidade do Amapá) is an ecological corridor in the state of Amapá, Brazil. It provides a degree of integrated management for conservation units and other areas covering over 70% of the state.

== Organization ==
The project to establish the Amapá Biodiversity Corridor was presented by Antônio Waldez Góes da Silva, governor of Amapá, at the 2003 Durban World Conference of Protected Areas. The proposed corridor would include marshland, tropical forest and open spaces of importance in maintaining global biodiversity. The acts that would lead to conservation measures in the corridor were signed in 2005.

The corridor covers more than 70% of the state, and should allow for coordinated management of conservation units and indigenous territories in the state in line with the principles laid out in the Rio Convention on Biodiversity. The corridor and the conservation units it contains will be co-funded by the Amapá Fund. The Amapá Initiative is run by a partnership of the state of Amapá, Conservation International and the Fundo Vale for Sustainable Development. It aims to promote governance and institutions, support sustainable development, and promote consistent policies with decisions based on monitoring and evaluating results.

== Extent ==
The corridor covers 10,476,117 hectares (25,887,050 acres), or 72% of the state, in 12 protected areas and five indigenous territories. The corridor links protected areas in Amapá to protected areas in Pará and in other Guiana Shield countries. As of 2016 it included 12 federal or state protected areas and five indigenous territories. The Guiana Shield, and the state of Amapá, have great biodiversity. More than 180 mammal species have been identified in the protected areas, including the jaguar, giant otter, red-handed howler, giant anteater and Amazonian manatee.

The corridor includes the Juminá, Galibi, Uaça, Parque do Tumucumaque and Waiãpi indigenous territories. Protected areas include:

Name	Level	Created	Area (ha)
Amapá National Forest	Federal	1989	460,352
Amapá State Forest	State	2006	2,369,400
Cape Orange National Park	Federal	1980	657,318
Fazendinha Environmental Protection Area	State	2004	137
Jari Ecological Station	Federal	1982	227,126
Lago Piratuba Biological Reserve	Federal	1980	392,469
Maracá-Jipioca Ecological Station	Federal	1981	60,253
Parazinho Biological Reserve	State	1985	111
Rio Cajari Extractive Reserve	Federal	1990	501,771
Rio Curiau Environmental Protection Area	State	1998	21,676
Rio Iratapuru Sustainable Development Reserve	State	1997	806,184
Tumucumaque Mountains National Park	Federal	2002	3,887,400

== Sources ==
- Amapá: A new development model for the Amazon, CI: Conservation International
- Corredor de Biodiversidade do Amapá Biodiversity Corridor (PDF), Belém: CI-Brasil, Governo do Amapá, Fundação Lee & Gund, 2007
- Dever, Austin (16 March 2016), "Amapá State, Brazil", Nature needs half
- Tamburelli, Gianfranco (2008), Legal Systems for the Management of Protected Areas in Italy and Ukraine: The Experiences of the Lazio and Kyiv Regions, Giuffrè Editore, ISBN 978-88-14-14368-7
