= Ferreira Gomes =

Municipality in Amapá, Brazil

- Municipality
- Municipio de Ferreira Gomes
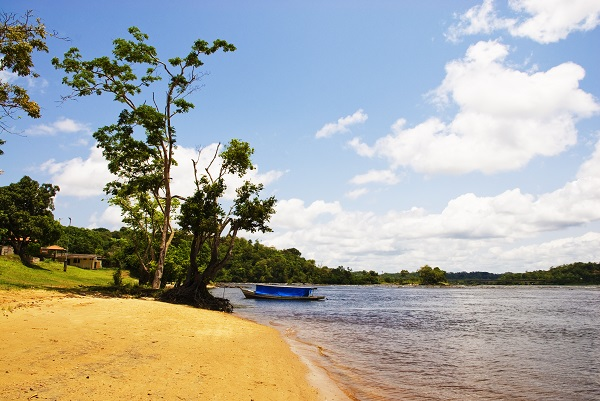

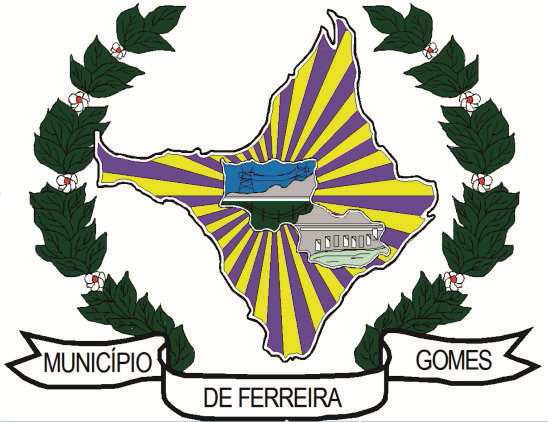
- Flag Coat of arms

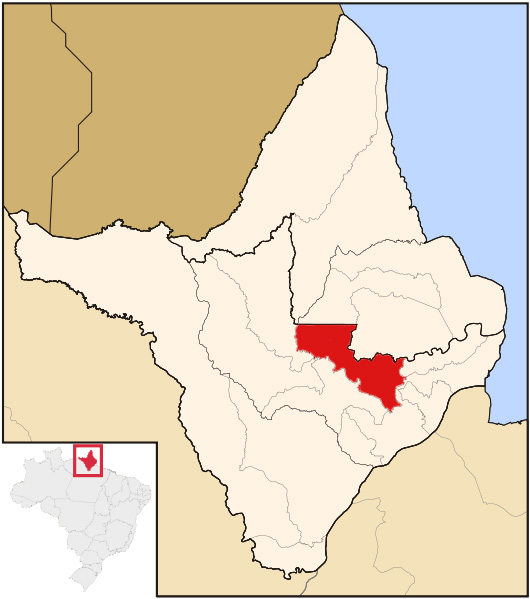
- Location of Ferreira Gomes in the State of Amapá
- Coordinates: 00°51′28″N 51°10′48″W
- Country: Brazil
- Region: North
- State: Amapá
- Founded: 1 January 1989

Government
  - Mayor: João Álvaro Rocha Rodrigues (PATRI)

Area
  - Total: 5,047 km^{2} (1,949 sq mi)

Population (2020)
  - Total: 7,967
  - Density: 1.579/km^{2} (4.088/sq mi)
- Time zone: UTC−3 (BRT)

Ferreira Gomes (Brazilian Portuguese pronunciation: [feˈʁejɾɐ ˈɡomis]) is a municipality located in the center of the state of Amapá, Brazil. Its population is 7,967 and its area is 5,047 square kilometres (1,949 mi^{2}). The town began as the military headquarters of Pedro II and was founded by João Ferreira Gomes. In 1989, it became an independent municipality.

== Nature ==
The municipality contains 3.64% of the 2,369,400-hectare (5,855,000-acre) Amapá State Forest, a sustainable use conservation unit established in 2006. It also contains 44.07% of the 460,353-hectare (1,137,560-acre) Amapá National Forest, a sustainable use conservation unit created in 1989.

== Economy ==
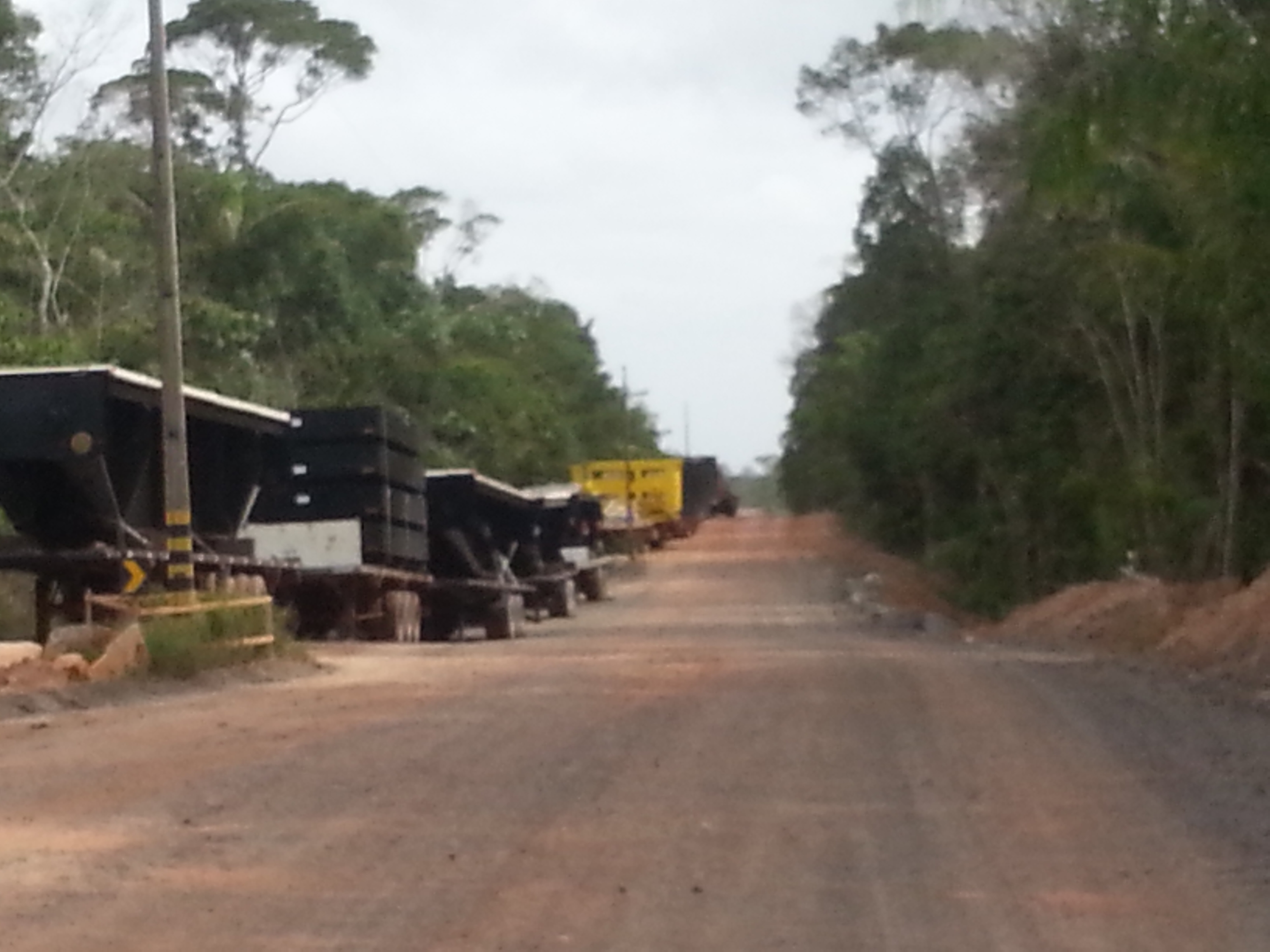
Road in Ferreira Gomes

The economy is mainly based on agriculture and livestock in particular cattle and buffalo. The main agricultural products are cassava, corn and bananas. In the 1970s, pine plantations were established for the pulp industry. Ferreira Gomes is located on the BR-156 highway.

== Hydroelectric Plant ==
The Coaracy Nunes Hydroelectric Plant (Usina Hidrelétrica Coaracy Nunes) is a hydroelectric power plant located on the Araguari River. It is near Vila do Paredão. Construction started in the 1960s, and was completed in 1978. The plant consists of a 24.9 km^{2} dam. Originally it only supplied to cities of Macapá and Santana, but was later expanded for the whole region. In 2015, the output was 78 MW.
