= Parahancornia peruviana =

Scientific classification
- Kingdom: Plantae
- Clade: Tracheophytes
- Clade: Angiosperms
- Clade: Eudicots
- Clade: Asterids
- Order: Gentianales
- Family: Apocynaceae
- Genus: Parahancornia
- Species: P. peruviana

Binomial name
- Parahancornia peruviana Monach.

Species of plant

Parahancornia peruviana is a species of tree in the family Apocynaceae. It is native to South America.
