= Parahancornia fasciculata =

Scientific classification
- Kingdom: Plantae
- Clade: Tracheophytes
- Clade: Angiosperms
- Clade: Eudicots
- Clade: Asterids
- Order: Gentianales
- Family: Apocynaceae
- Genus: Parahancornia
- Species: P. fasciculata

Binomial name
- Parahancornia fasciculata (Poir. Benoist

Synonyms
- Couma fasciculata (Poir.) Benoist; Hancornia amapa Huber; Macoubea fasciculata (Poir.) Lemée; Malouetia lactiflua Miers; Parahancornia amapa (Huber) Ducke; Tabernaemontana fasciculata Poir.; Tabernaemontana lactiflua Miers; Thyrsanthus fasciculatus (Poir.) Miers

Species of plant

Parahancornia fasciculata is a flowering plant native to rainforest in South America. The latex from the tree is used in traditional medicine.
