= Amapá (municipality) =

Municipality in Amapá, Brazil

- Municipality
- Municipality of Amapá
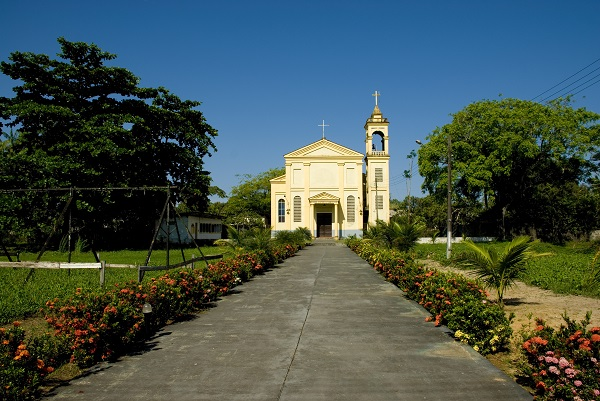
- Church of Amapá

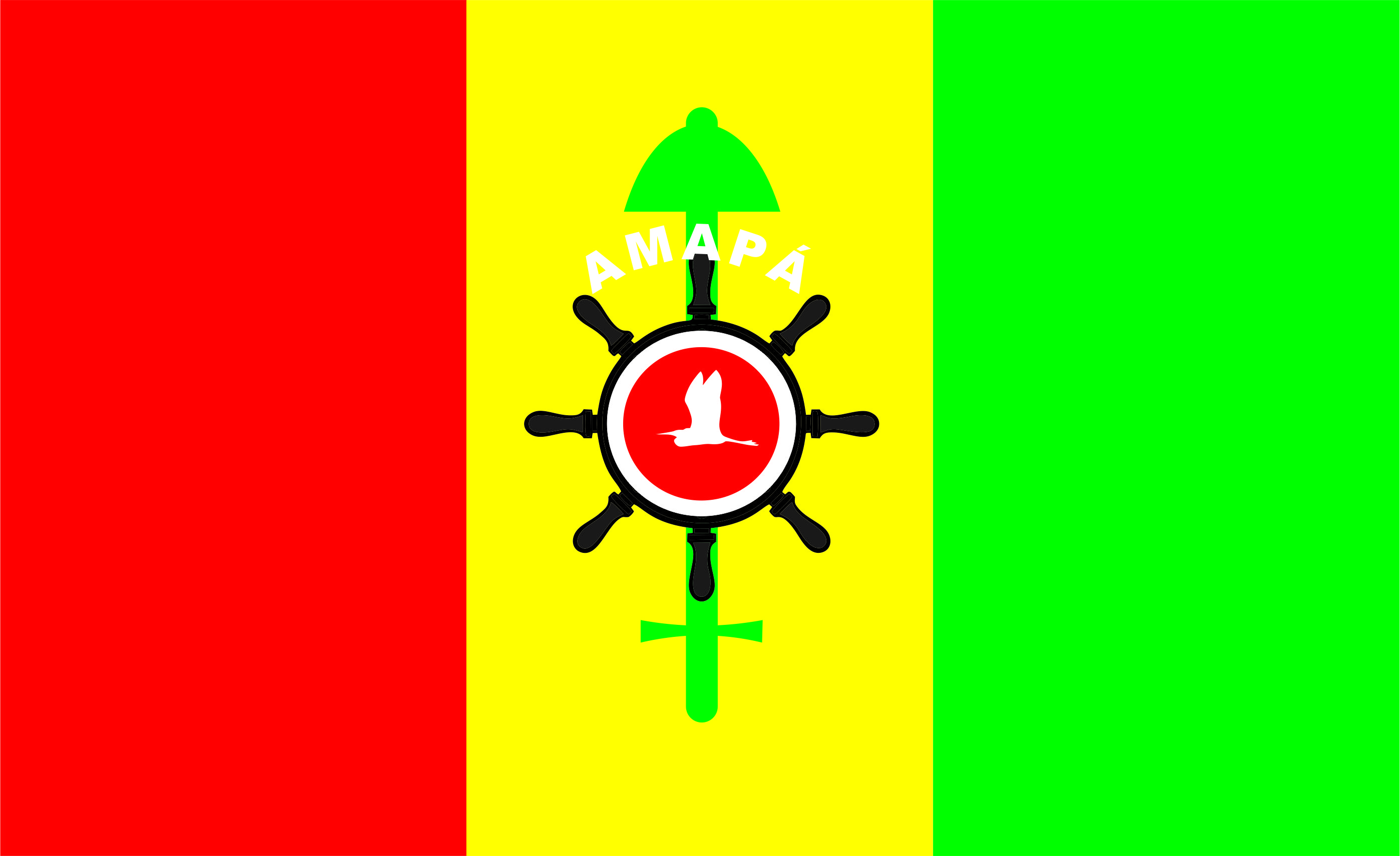
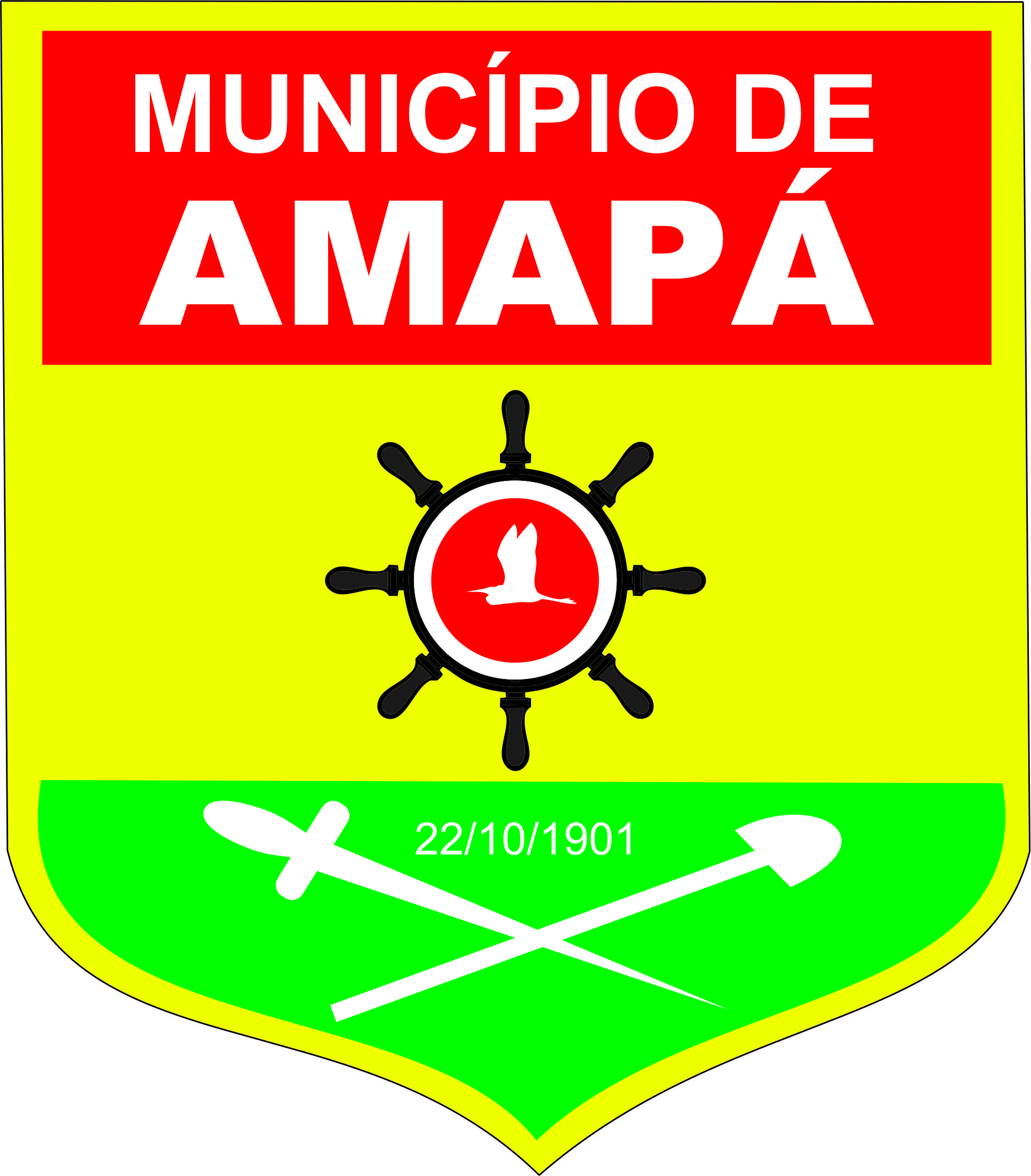
- Flag Coat of arms

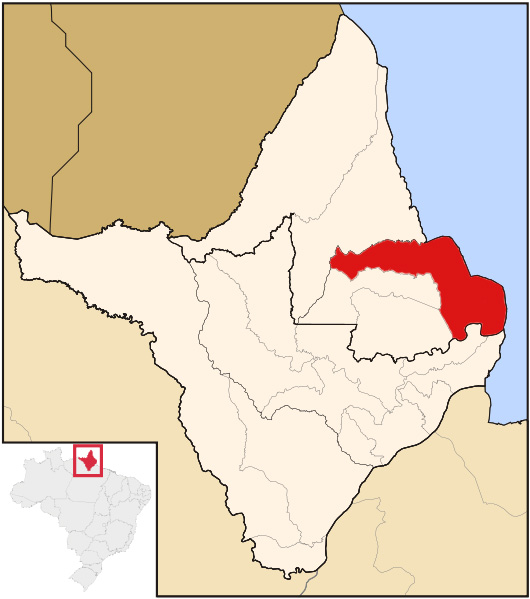
- Location in Amapá State

- Location in Brazil
- Coordinates: 02°03′10″N 50°47′34″W
- Country: Brazil
- Region: North
- State: Amapá
- Founded: 1901

Government
  - Mayor: Carlos Sampaio Duarte (UNIÃO)

Area
  - Total: 8,454.847 km^{2} (3,264.435 sq mi)
- Elevation: 8 m (26 ft)

Population (2020)
  - Total: 9,187
  - Density: 1.087/km^{2} (2.814/sq mi)
- Time zone: UTC−3 (BRT)
- HDI (2010): 0.642 – medium

Amapá (Brazilian Portuguese pronunciation: [ɐmaˈpa]) is a municipality located in the easternmost portion of the homonymous state of Amapá, Brazil. Its population is 9,187 and its area is 9,169 square kilometres (3,540 sq mi).

== History ==
The borders between French Guiana and Brazil were not clear. Attempts at negotiations failed, and in 1862 it was decided that the area between the Amazon and the Oyapock was a neutral territory. In 1894 gold was discovered in the Calçoene River, which resulted in a declaration of an autonomous state under Brazilian protection by general Francisco Cabral. In May 1895, Camille Charvein, the Governor of French Guiana, sent troops to Mapá (nowadays: Amapá). During the battle, six French, and 30 Brazilian soldiers and civilians were killed. In 1897, France and Brazil asked Switzerland to settle the dispute, and most of the territory was given to Brazil in what is nowadays the state of Amapá.

The municipality was founded in 1911 as Montenegro. In 1930, the name was changed to Amapá after the Amapá tree. The municipality contains two districts: the town of Amapá and Sucuriju. The municipality is home to a World War II airbase built by the Americans which has been turned into a museum.

== Geography ==
The municipality is home to part of the Lago Piratuba Biological Reserve. It also contains the Maracá-Jipioca Ecological Station, which covers two very low-lying islands just off the coast with rich biodiversity. It contains 6.32% of the 2,369,400-hectare (5,855,000-acre) Amapá State Forest, a sustainable use conservation unit established in 2006. It contains 3.08% of the 460,353-hectare (1,137,560-acre) Amapá National Forest, a sustainable use conservation unit created in 1989.

From Amapá you can access Cachoeira Grande, a series of waterfalls in the Amapá Grande River. The site is technically located in the Calçoene municipality. Near the falls, is a sandbank and a holiday resort with restaurants.

== See also ==
- Sucuriju, fishing village and district of Amapá
