= Amapá =

State of Brazil

- State
- Flag Coat of arms
- Anthem: Hino do Amapá
- Location in Brazil
- Coordinates: 1°N 52°W
- Country: Brazil
- Capital and largest city: Macapá

Government
  - Type: Unitary state
  - Governor: Clécio Luís (UNIÃO)
  - Vice Governor: Teles Junior (PDT)
  - Senators: Davi Alcolumbre (UNIÃO); Lucas Barreto (PSD); Randolfe Rodrigues (PT)
  - Legislature: Legislative Assembly of Amapá

Area
  - Total: 142,814.585 km^{2} (55,141.020 sq mi)
  - Rank: 18th
- Highest elevation: 681 m (2,234 ft)

Population (2022)
  - Total: 733,759
  - Rank: 26th
  - Density: 5.13784/km^{2} (13.3070/sq mi)
  - Rank: 23rd
- Demonym: Portuguese: Amapaense

GDP (2024)
  - Total: R$30.529 billion (US$5.665 billion)

HDI
  - Year: 2024
  - Category: 0.759 – high (22nd)
- Time zone: UTC−03:00 (BRT)
- Postal Code: 68900-000 to 68999-000
- ISO 3166 code: BR-AP
- Website: www.portal.ap.gov.br

Amapá (/ˌɑːməˈpɑː/ AH-mə-PAH; Portuguese: [amaˈpa]) is one of the 26 states of Brazil. It is in the North Region of Brazil. It is the second-least populous state and the eighteenth-largest state by area. Located in the far northern part of the country, Amapá is bordered clockwise by French Guiana to the north for 730 km, the Atlantic Ocean to the east for 578 km, Pará to the south and west, and Suriname to the northwest for 63 km. The capital and largest city is Macapá. The state has 0.4% of the Brazilian population and is responsible for 0.22% of the Brazilian GDP.

In the colonial period the region was called Portuguese Guiana and was part of Portugal's State of Brazil. Later, the region was distinguished from the other Guianas. Amapá was once part of Pará, but became a separate territory in 1943, and the decision to make it a state was made in 1988. The first state legislators took office on 1 January 1991.

The dominant feature of the region, and 90 percent of its total area, is the Amazon rainforest. Unexplored forests occupy 70 percent of Amapá, and Tumucumaque Mountains National Park, established in 2002, is the largest tropical forest park in the world. The mouth of the River Oiapoque is the northern end of Brazil's coastline.

== History ==
During the colonial era from 1637 to 1654 the Amapá region was merged into the Captaincy of Pará, which was the Captaincy of Cabo de Norte. In the early colonial period the Amapá region was a rich source of lumber, resins, annatto, vegetable oils, and salted fish, all of which were exported to Europe. The French established sugarcane plantations in this period.

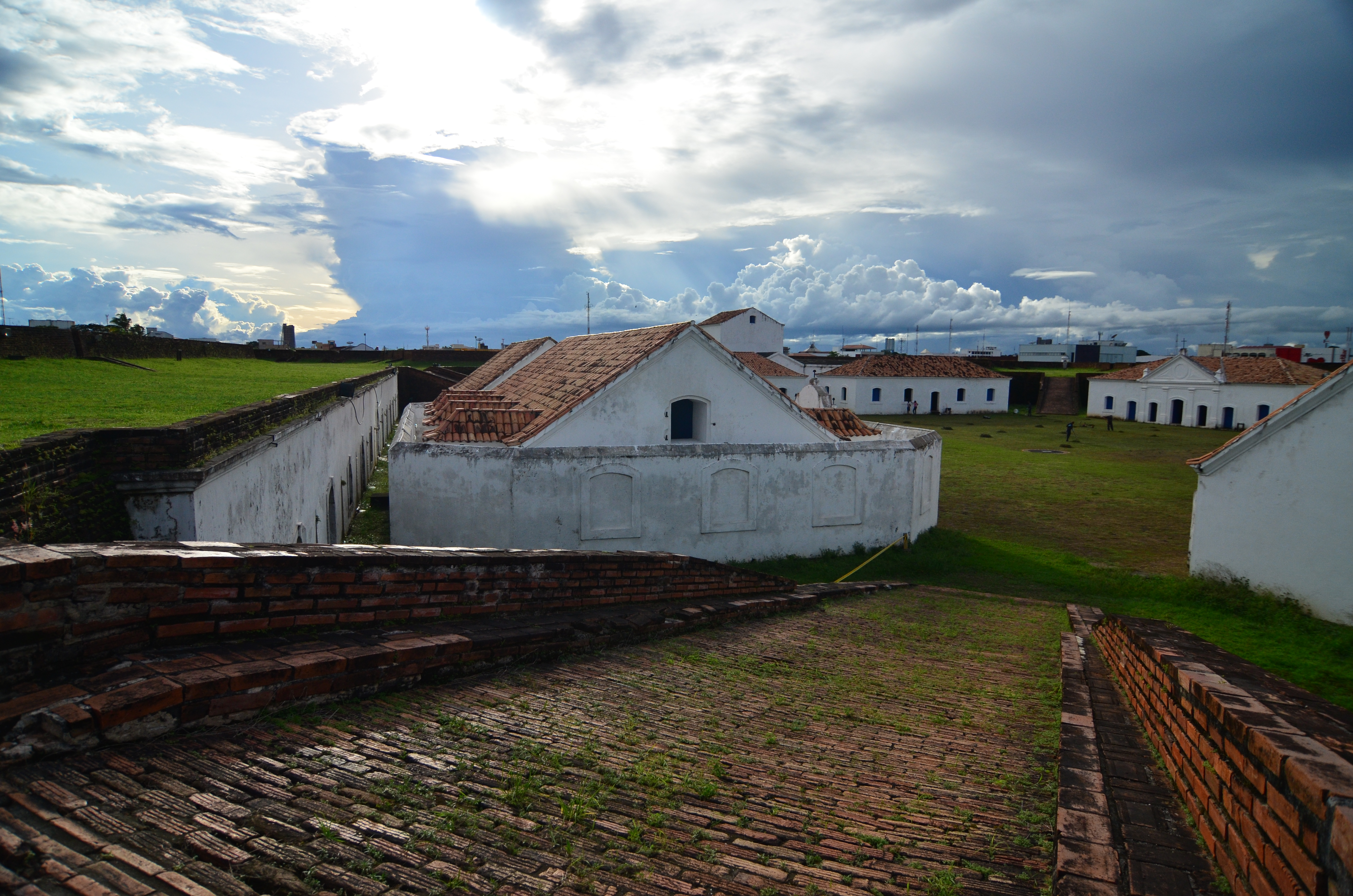
São José de Macapá

With the discovery of mineral deposits the Amapá region was invaded by the British and Dutch, who were ultimately repelled by the Portuguese. The Treaty of Utrecht in 1713 established the boundaries between the colony of Brazil and French Guiana, but these were not respected by the French. A fort was constructed at São José de Macapá, in present-day Macapá, as a base of Portuguese power in the region. In the 18th century, France retook control of the area. This international dispute continued until 1900.

The discovery of gold and the increasing value of rubber on the international market during the 19th century increased the Portuguese population of Amapá, bringing the dispute with France to a head. Although French settlers had established the Republic of Independent Guyana (1886–1891), Brazil challenged the Amapá claim through international arbitration in Geneva on 1 December 1900, which was found in favour of Brazil. It was subsequently incorporated into the state of Pará, as Araguari after the Araguari River and in 1943 this became the federal territory of Amapá.

The discovery of rich manganese deposits in Serra do Navio in 1945 revolutionized the local economy. Manganese remains the largest source of revenue in the state. Amapá's move to statehood was made on 5 October 1988, at the time of the promulgation of the new Brazilian Constitution, with the first state legislators taking office at the start of 1991.

== Geography ==
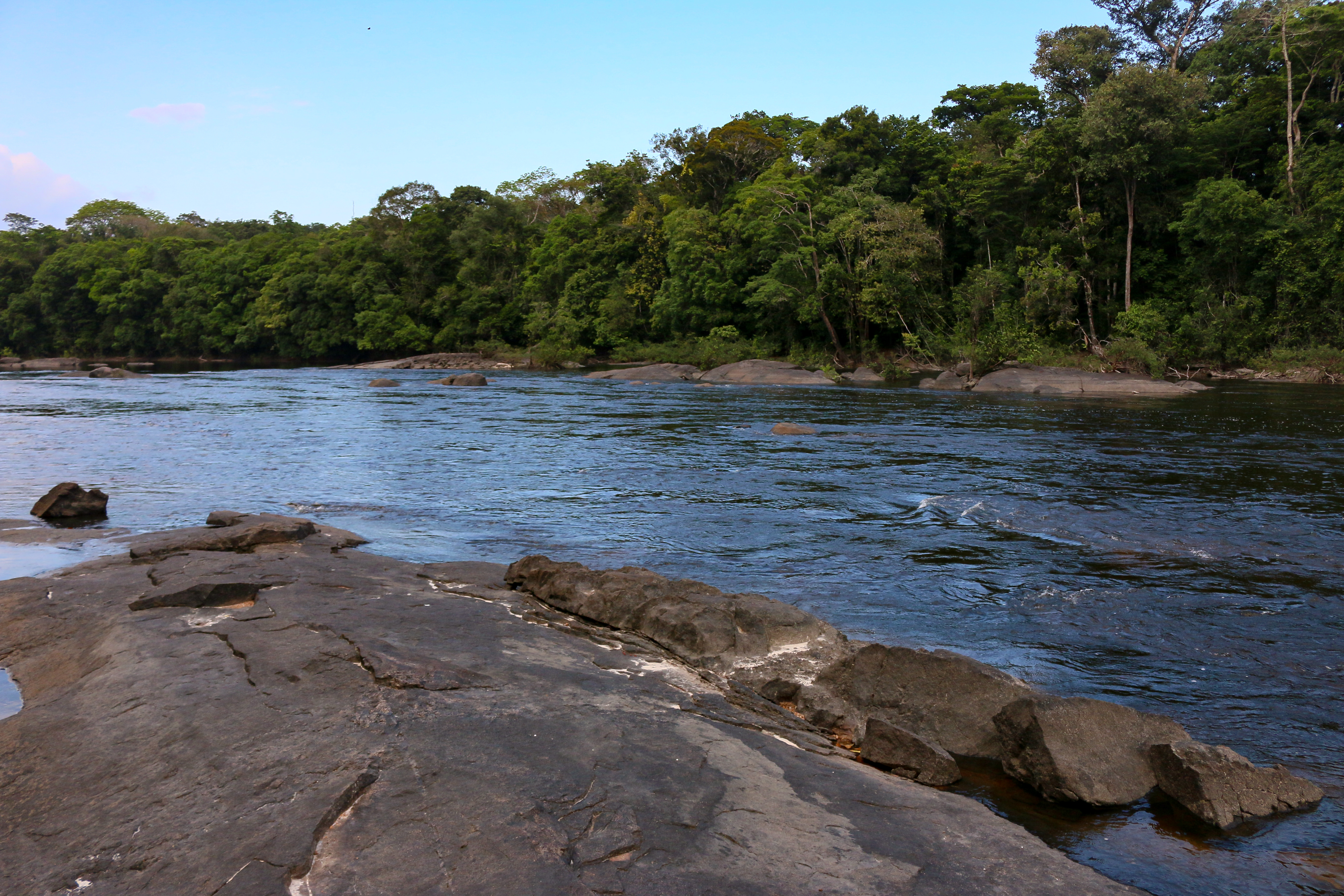
Amapá National Forest

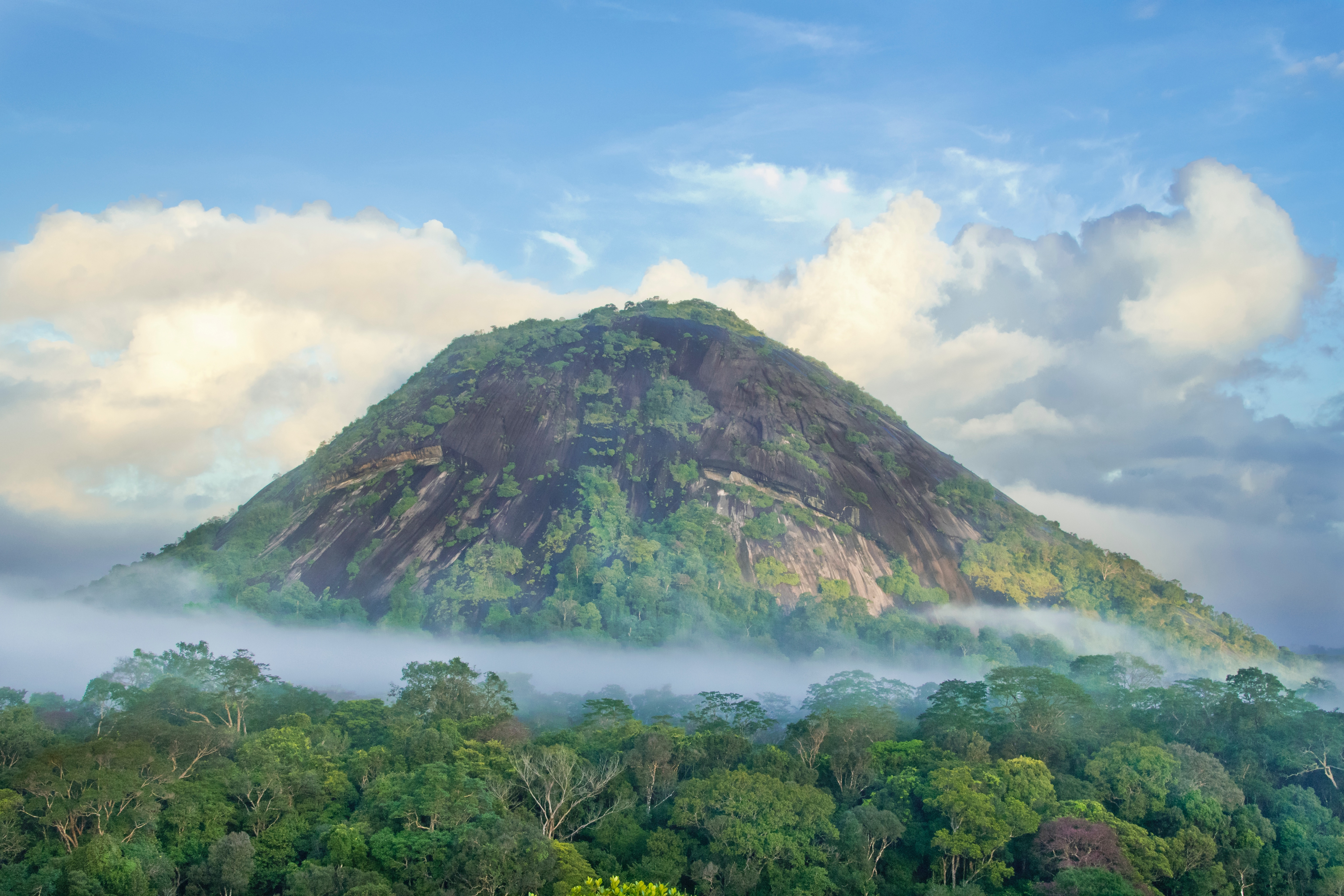
Karupina mountain in the Uaçá Indigenous Territory, Amapá, Brazil.

The State of Amapá possesses the lowest rate of loss of its original vegetation for any Brazilian state, estimated at only 2%. Most of the Amapá territory is covered with rainforest, while the remaining areas are covered with savannah and plains. On the Amapá coast, almost intact beaches mix with swamps, creating the largest representation of this biome in Brazil. This mixture of salt and fresh water is perfect for the food chain reproduction of several animal species. Pollution, however, is now a chronic problem in the state of Amapá. Mercury, which is used in the extraction of gold, is widely found in water sources and sewage systems in the population centers of Amapá.

=== Nature ===
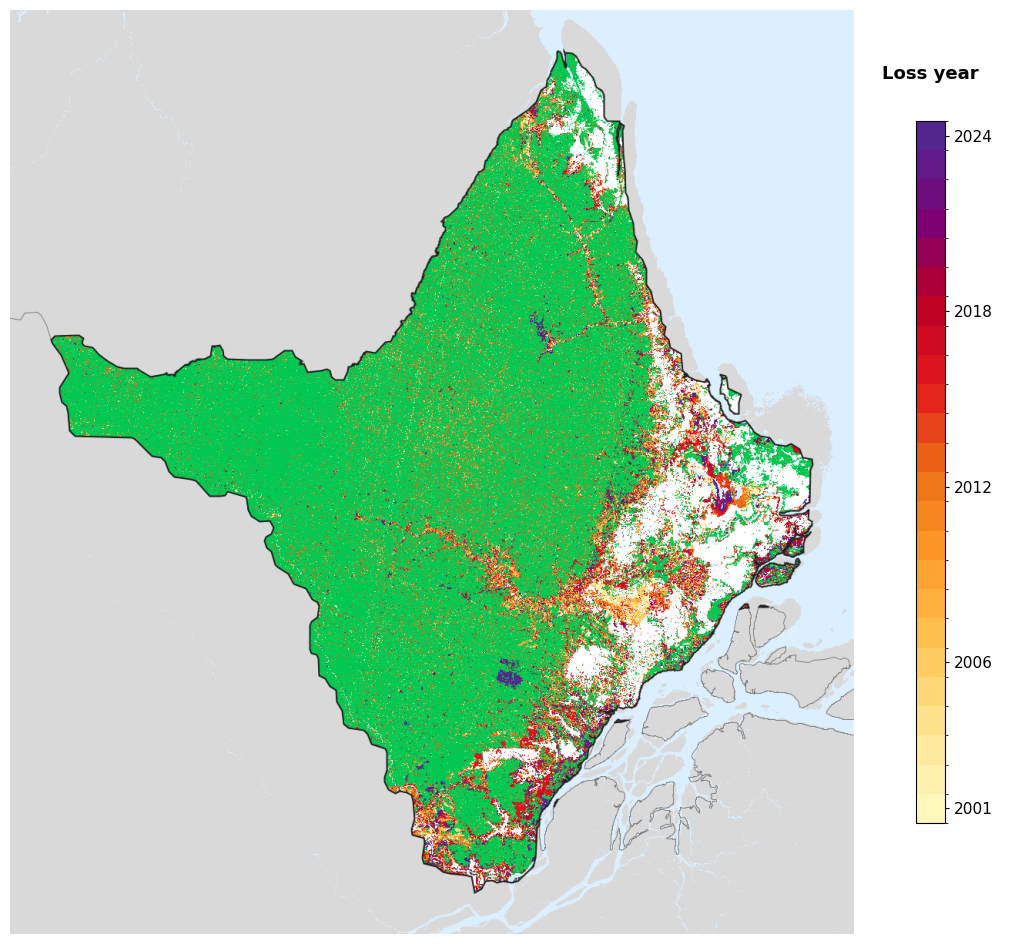
Tree-cover loss year in Amapá, 2001-2024, from the Global Forest Change dataset.

To protect the natural resources of the state, there are, as of 2016, 12 protected areas and five indigenous territories covering 10,476,117 hectares (25,887,050 acres), or 72% of the state. The Amapá Biodiversity Corridor has been established in 2003 to provide integrated management for the conservation area. The most important protected areas are the Tumucumaque Mountains National Park located in the west of the state, and the Cabo Orange National Park located near the coast. The Tumucumaque Mountains National Park is the world's largest tropical forest national park. The Cabo Orange National Park contains flooded grasslands and mangrove forests which are important fish nurseries.

=== Climate ===
Köppen map for Amapá

Most of Amapá has a Tropical monsoon climate, a tropical climate with a short dry season and heavy rainfall for the majority of the year. In the Köppen climate classification, it is classified under the letters Am. Tropical rainforest is the natural vegetation, and also provides the other climate type located in the state.

== Demographics ==
Race and ethnicity in Amapá
Ethnicity	Percentage
Pardo (Multiracial)	65.3%
White	21.4%
Black	11.8%
Amerindian	1.4%
Asian	0.1%

Historical population
Year	Pop.	±%
1950	37,477	—
1960	68,889	+83.8%
1970	116,480	+69.1%
1980	180,078	+54.6%
1991	288,690	+60.3%
2000	477,032	+65.2%
2010	669,526	+40.4%
2022	733,759	+9.6%

According to the 2022 census, there were 733,759 people residing in the state, with a population density of 5.1/km^{2}. The population of Amapá is highly urbanized, with 93.7% of the population residing primarily in Macapá and Santana. Population growth: 5.7% (1991–2000); Houses: 144,000 (2006).

During the 2022 census, 65.3% identified as Pardo (multiracial), 21.4% as White Brazilians, 11.8% as Black Brazilians and 1.4% as Indigenous. The remaining 0.1% are Asians and undeclared.

The majority of the residents of Amapá live in poverty. According to the Fundação Getulio Vargas (FGV) 36.56% of the population live on only R$79 per month, which the foundation considers below a decent standard of living.

=== Religion ===
According to data obtained by the IBGE in the 2010 Brazilian Census, 64% of Amapá residents were Roman Catholics, 28% were Evangelicals (Protestants) and 6% did not profess any religion. The other faiths added together formed 2% of the population.

The Catholic Church comprises the Diocese of Macapá (1949) a suffragan diocese of the Archdiocese of Belém de Pará, under Bishop Pedro José Conti (2004) with 27 parishes.

=== Municipalities ===
It is divided into 16 municipalities.

Largest cities or towns in Amapá (2010 census by the Brazilian Institute of Geography and Statistics)
Rank		Mesoregion	Pop.	Rank		Mesoregion	Pop.
1	Macapá	Sul	407,023	11	Amapá	Norte	8,142
2	Santana	Sul	102,860	12	Ferreira Gomes	Sul	5,974
3	Laranjal do Jari	Sul	40,819	13	Cutias	Sul	4,805
4	Oiapoque	Norte	21,094	14	Serra do Navio	Sul	4,463
5	Mazagão	Sul	17,419	15	Itaubal	Sul	4,370
6	Porto Grande	Sul	17,252	16	Pracuúba	Norte	3,909
7	Tartarugalzinho	Norte	12,981
8	Vitória do Jari	Sul	12,725
9	Pedra Branca do Amapari	Sul	11,291
10	Calçoene	Norte	9,174

=== Indigenous population ===
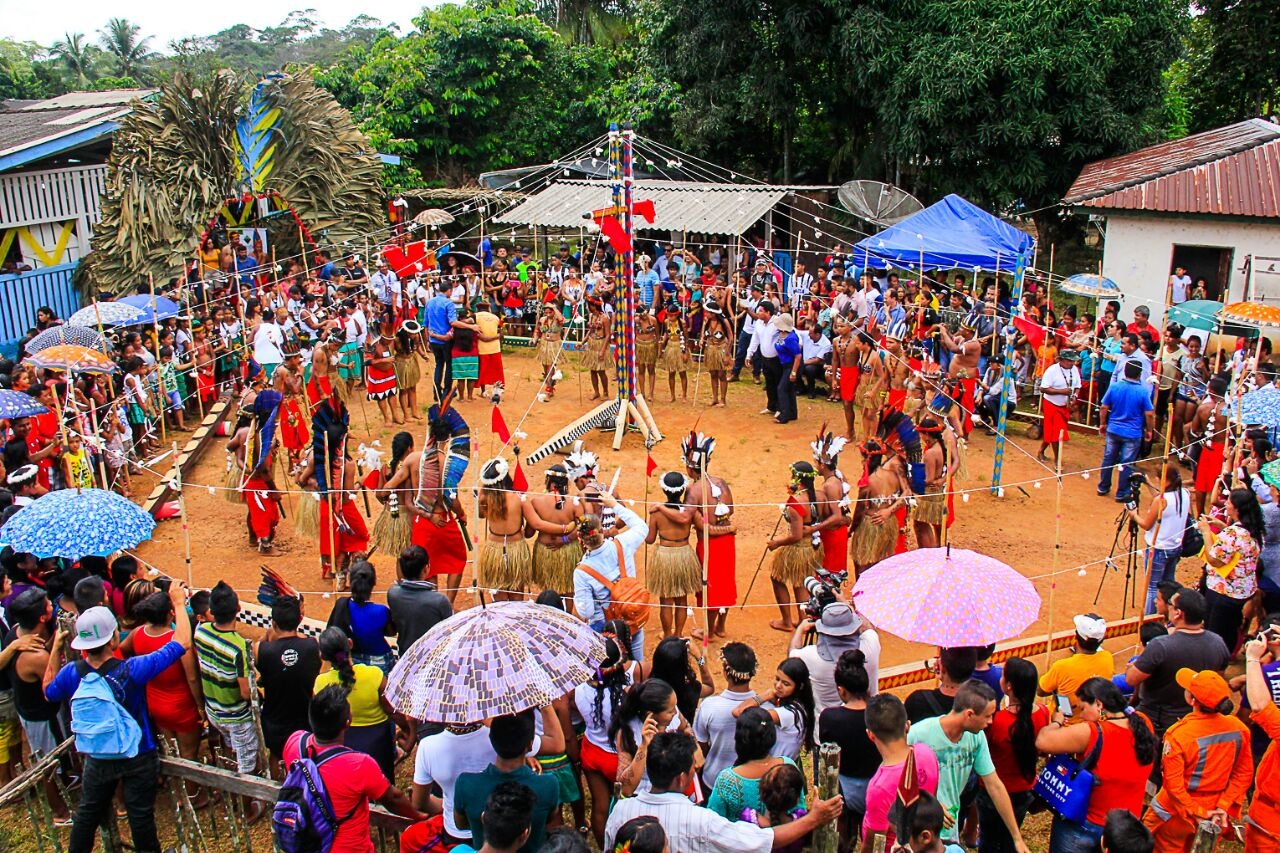
Celebration of Indian Day in Manga

The Amerindian tribes in Amapá are located in the north near the Oiapoque River, and in the east in the Wayampi Indigenous Territory. All the indigenous territories in Amapá have been demarcated. The tribes living in Amapá are the Galibi do Oiapoque, the Karipuna do Amapá, the Palikur, the Wayampi and the Galibi Marworno.

The region around the Amazon River used to support a large population of Amerindians during the pre-Columbian era. The policy of the Portuguese monarchy was to engage in war in order to clear them from the land. The Cabanagem Revolt in the 1830s, resulted in the final dispersal of the Amerindians along the Amazon.

=== Education ===
Portuguese is the official national language, and thus the primary language taught in schools. French is the second language taught in every school due to the proximity of French Guiana. A Creole language called Lanc-Patuá is spoken among some of the people.

==== Educational institutions ====
- Universidade Federal do Amapá (Unifap) (Federal University of Amapá)
- Universidade Estadual do Amapá (UEAP) (Amapá State University)
- Instituto Federal de Educação, Ciência e Tecnologia do Amapá (IFAP) (Amapá Federal Institute of Education, Science and Technology)
- Centro de Ensino Superior do Amapá (Ceap)
- Instituto de Ensino Superior do Amapá (Iesap)
- Instituto Macapaense de Ensino Superior (IMMES)
- Faculdade Seama (Seama College)

== Economy ==
The service sector is the largest component of GDP at 87.6%, followed by the industrial sector at 7.8%. Agriculture represents 4.6% of GDP (2004). Amapá exports: wood 75.5%, ores 18.7%, heart of palm 5.5% (2002). The state, which has 0.4% of the Brazilian population, is responsible for only 0.22% of the Brazilian GDP.

== Transport ==
Main transport infrastructure in 2018

=== International Airport ===
The main airport of the state is Macapá International Airport. On 12 April 2019 a new terminal was opened replacing an older facility. Following its closure, the old terminal was demolished to make room for an enlarged apron which was completed by 2020.

=== Highways ===
There are two federal highways in Amapá: BR-156 connects Laranjal do Jari, Macapá and Oiapoque. The highway is connected to the road network of French Guiana via the Oyapock River Bridge. BR-210 connects Macapá with Serra do Navio. It is supposed to be extended all the way to the border with Colombia in Amazonas; however, as of 2021, it ends in the Wayampi Indigenous Territory. An important state road is the AP-010 which connects Macapá with Santana and Mazagão Velho.

There are no road connections to other Brazilian states. In Laranjal do Jari there is a ferry to Monte Dourado in Pará. In Port Santana, there is a ferry to Belém, Pará.

=== Ports and harbours ===
There is a small port in Macapá; however, it is not suitable for cargo traffic. The main harbour is the Port of Santana which is also used for international cargo.

== Flag ==
The flag was adopted by Decree No. 8 of 23 April 1984. The blue represents the sky over Amapá and justice; the green represents the native rainforest; and the yellow represents the Union and its natural resources. The black stands for the deceased who worked for the state, and the white for the will of the state to live in peace and stability. The symbol on the hoist-side represents the Fortress of São José, out of which the state capital grew.

Before 1984, the state had a red-white-red flag, based on the flag of Pará, and similar to the flag of Peru.

== See also ==
- Brazil
- Portugal
- Calçoene - Amapá town, site of pre-colonial observatory
- List of municipalities in Amapá
- List of governors of Amapá
- Eletrobras
- Central Market of Macapá
- Politics of Amapá
