= Rio Cajari Extractive Reserve =

Extractive reserve in Amapá, Brazil

- Reserva Extrativista do Rio Cajari
- IUCN category VI (protected area with sustainable use of natural resources)
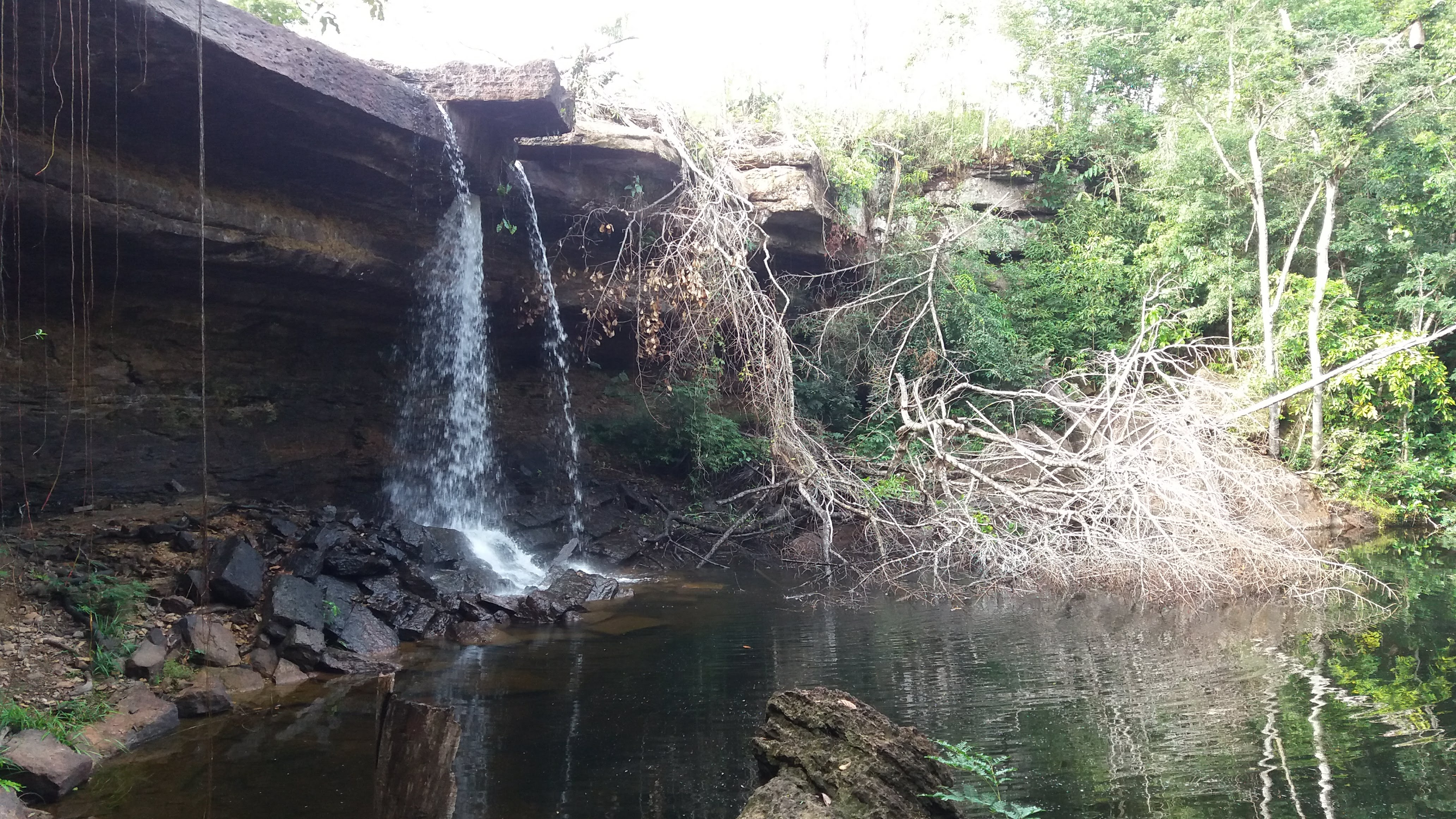

- Location within Brazil
- Nearest city: Mazagão, Amapá
- Coordinates: 0°41′27″S 51°58′37″W
- Area: 501,771 hectares (1,239,900 acres)
- Designation: Extractive reserve
- Created: 12 March 1990
- Administrator: Chico Mendes Institute for Biodiversity Conservation

The Rio Cajari Extractive Reserve (Portuguese: Reserva Extrativista do Rio Cajari) is an extractive reserve in the state of Amapá, Brazil. It protects a region of dense rainforest, cerrado fields and flooded riparian zones that is rich in biodiversity. Formerly it was used for rubber extraction, and later efforts were made to develop a pulp industry. Extraction of timber for sale is now prohibited. The residents, who are poorly educated and suffer poor health, engage in subsistence hunting, fishing and farming, and extract forest products such as Brazil nuts, açaí palm fruit and heart of palm.

== Location ==
The Rio Cajari Extractive Reserve is divided between the municipalities of Mazagão (44.44%), Vitória do Jari (16.88%) and Laranjal do Jari (38.67%) in Amapá. It has an area of 501,771 hectares (1,239,900 acres). (Note: The area of 501,771 hectares (1,239,900 acres) is given by the Instituto Socioambiental (ISA), which uses a definition of the polygon covered by the reserve to overlay it on a map. According to ICMBio the area is 532,397.20 hectares (1,315,582.1 acres).) The Cajari River, which gives its name to the reserve, drains the center of the reserve. The Amazon River forms the southeast boundary of the reserve, and the Ajuruxi River defines the northeastern boundary. Highway BR-156 runs through the northern part of the reserve, connecting the town of Laranjal do Jari on the Jari River to the west of the reserve with the state capital of Macapá to the east. The Rio Iratapuru Sustainable Development Reserve and the Jari Ecological Station are a few kilometers to the north of the reserve.

== History ==
In the mid-20th century the area now covered by the reserve was used for rubber extraction. Rubber tappers drawn to the area also learned to extract natural products. Later it became the property of the American millionaire Daniel K. Ludwig, founder of Jari project, which aimed to develop forestry, agriculture and mining. This involved deforestation of large areas and planting exotic species as sources of cellulose.

A group of Brazilian businessmen with government backing took over the Jari project in 1981, but faced many problems including low soil fertility, erosion, failure of the exotic species to adapt to the climate, pests and diseases. There were conflicts with the traditional extractive population, who organized into what became a cooperative association. In 1985 the Rural Workers Union of Macapa joined the struggle for the creation of protected areas for rubber tappers, and the concept began to be accepted by the government.

The Rio Cajari Extractive Reserve was created by federal decree 99.145 of 12 March 1990. A decree of 30 September 1997 declared that the Brazilian Institute of Environment and Renewable Natural Resources (IBAMA) could expropriate an area of about 501,771 hectares (1,239,900 acres) covered by the reserve. The reserve is classed as IUCN protected area category VI (protected area with sustainable use of natural resources). The reserve is to ensure sustainable use and conservation of renewable natural resources used by the traditional extractive populations. IBAMA was made responsible for management. Today the reserve is administered by the Chico Mendes Institute for Biodiversity Conservation (ICMBio).

The reserve was made part of the Amapá Biodiversity Corridor, created in 2003. On 3 June 2003 the National Institute for Colonization and Agrarian Reform (INCRA) recognized the reserve as supporting 700 families. This was revised to 900 families on 24 August 2005 and to 1,500 families on 22 August 2006. The deliberative council was created on 7 February 2006. On 27 May 2015 the beneficiary profile of the reserve's families was approved.

== Environment ==
Average annual rainfall is 2,115 millimetres (83.3 in). The highest rainfall is in February–April, and the least is in September–December. Average daily temperatures range from 20 to 32 °C (68 to 90 °F) with an average of 25 °C (77 °F). Altitudes range from 4 to 130 metres (13 to 427 ft). Elevations are mostly below 30 metres (98 ft) in the lower Cajari region, and 61 to 120 metres (200 to 394 ft) in the upper Cajari, with the highest land in the northwest of the reserve. Soils are mainly oxisols but there are areas of gleysol and other soil types. The area is near the mouth of the Amazon and is therefore subject to tidal flooding, which deposits sediments in the lower areas. The reserve is drained by the Cajari and Ajuruxi rivers, and other smaller streams, all flowing into the Amazon. The upper and middle courses of the Cajari form flooded terraces. In the lower course the river merges with other water bodies, which form meanders, lakes and channels.

The reserve is in the Guiana Shield region, a center of endemism. The characteristic dense rainforest has many Brazil nuts (Bertholletia excelsa) and açaí palms (Euterpe oleracea). Migratory birds include fork-tailed flycatcher (Tyrannus savana), great-billed hermit (Phaethornis malaris) and red-eyed vireo (Vireo olivaceus). A quick survey near the Marinho community in the upper Cajari region recorded 15 species of non-flying mammals, 26 of flying mammals, 155 of birds, 13 of amphibians and 28 of reptiles. This almost certainly understates the true biodiversity. Another study in 2006 found 118 taxa of amphibians and reptiles.

The dense forest ecosystem is home to tapirs, agoutis, sloths, coati, monkeys and cats. Reptiles, small rodents and herbivorous mammals live in the cerrado fields ecosystems. The riparian ecosystems have a more abundant fauna including alligators, turtles, otters, giant otters, capybaras, tapir and paca, plentiful birds such as ducks, egrets, herons, kingfisher and many varieties of fish. Bird species include great-billed hermit, black-headed antbird (Percnostola rufifrons) and ferruginous-backed antbird (Myrmeciza ferruginea). Herpetofauna include Leposoma guianense, Atelopus spumarius, Arthrosaura kockii and Iphisa elegans. The frog species Pristimantis chiastonotus is endemic to Amapá.

== Economy ==
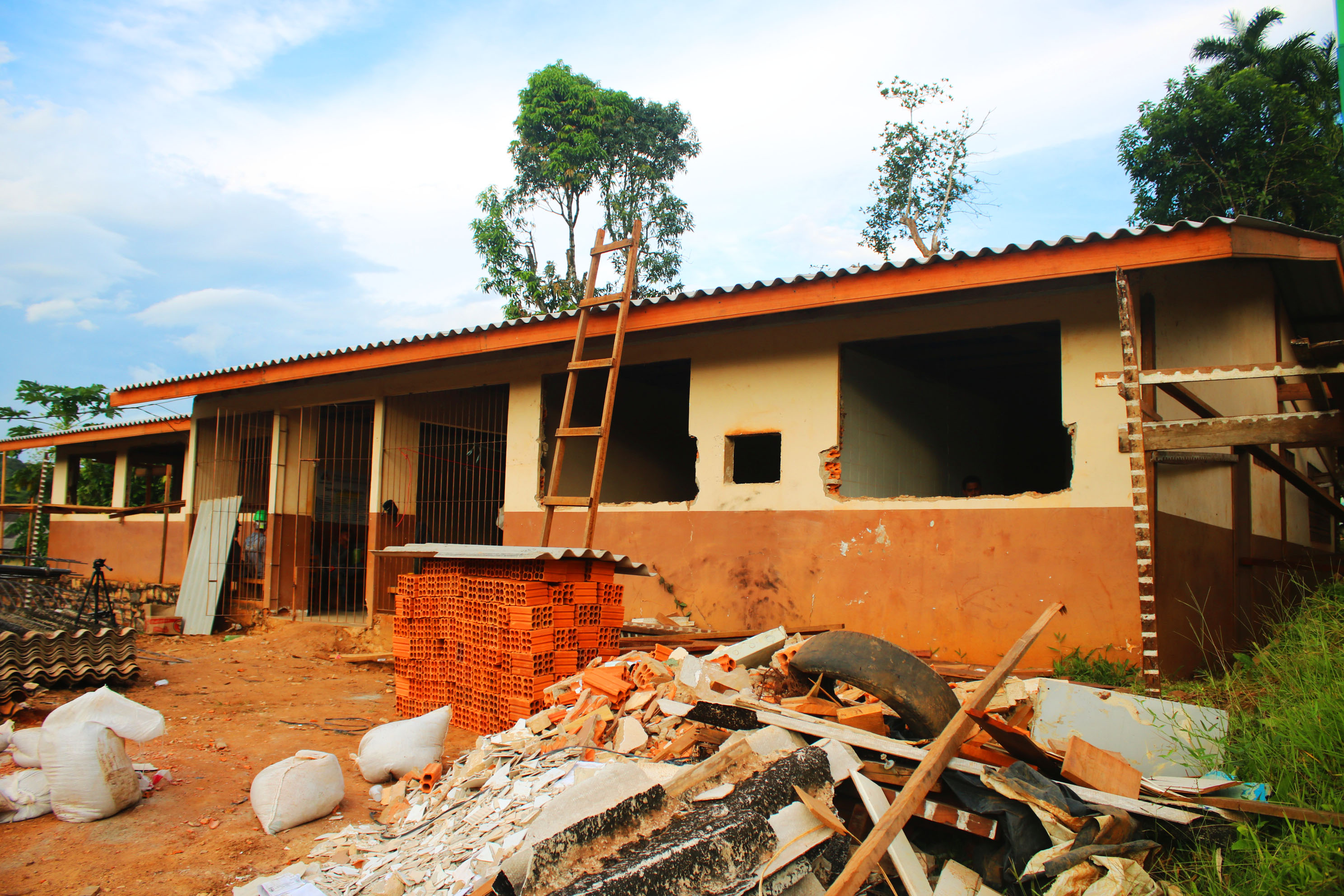
Construction of a health care centre in Água Branca do Cajari, Laranjal do Jari

Data from 1993 showed high infant mortality and lack of sanitation and clean water supplies. 60% of the population suffer from worms and 48% from respiratory diseases. 78% use home treatments for diseases. As of 2004 about 52% of the population was illiterate and only 10% had more than primary education. There were 19 schools, but these were not enough to meet the needs of the dispersed population and were in poor condition. There were nine rudimentary health care centers.

The main agricultural products are corn, beans, rice, pineapple, cassava, yams and sweet potatoes. Rubber is being phased out, and the main non-timber extractive products are now Brazil nuts and açaí hearts of palm and fruit. The residents fish for subsistence and for barter with trading boats to purchase manufactured goods. The residents practice subsistence hunting of birds of the Galliformes and Tinamiformes orders, and mammals such as peccary, paca, agouti and monkey. There is irregular hunting by residents and poachers from Macapá, Santana and Laranjal do Jari. Under the reserve's usage plan, timber should be extracted only for housing and other communities buildings.

== Sources ==
- Corredor de Biodiversidade do Amapá Biodiversity Corridor (PDF) (in Portuguese), Belém: CI-Brasil, Governo do Amapá, Fundação Lee & Gund, 2007, archived from the original (PDF) on 2019-04-14
- Resex do Rio Cajari (in Portuguese), ICMBio: Chico Mendes Institute for Biodiversity Conservation
- RESEX do Rio Cajari (in Portuguese), ISA: Instituto Socioambiental
- Unidade de Conservação: Reserva Extrativista Rio Cajari (in Portuguese), MMA: Ministério do Meio Ambiente
