= São Francisco do Iratapuru =

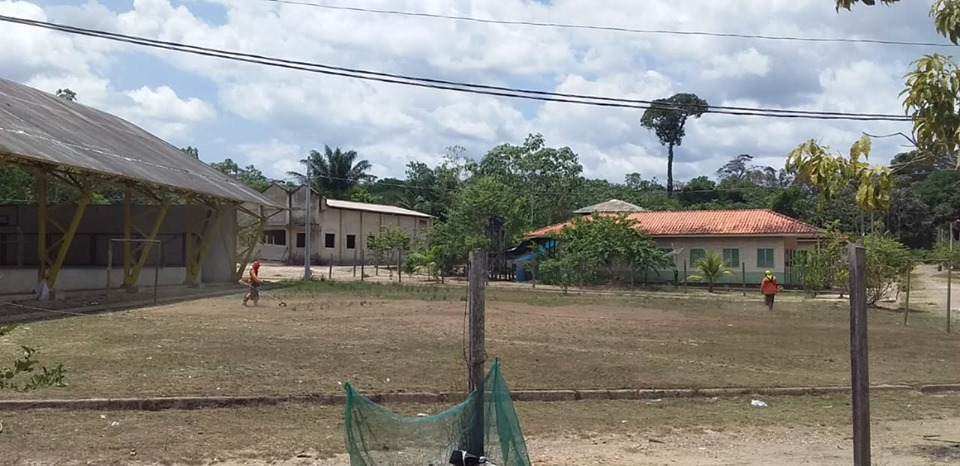

- Location in Brazil São Francisco do Iratapuru (Brazil)
- Coordinates: 0.5689°S 52.5794°W
- Country: Brazil
- Region: North
- State: Amapá
- Municipality: Laranjal do Jari
- Founded: 1980

Population (2010)
  - Total: 188
- Time zone: UTC−3 (BRT)

São Francisco do Iratapuru is a village in the Brazilian municipality of Laranjal do Jari, in the state of Amapá. It is located at the confluence of the Iratapuru and the Jari River, and is 12 kilometres from the Rio Iratapuru Sustainable Development Reserve. The village was founded in 1980. The economy of the village is based on Brazil nut extraction.

== History ==
São Francisco do Iratapuru is located in a part of the Amazon rainforest which was bought by Daniel K. Ludwig. In 1969, it became a site for the Jari project which intended to replace the rainforest with Gmelina arborea for the pulp industry. The project was a massive failure and was cancelled in 1982.

In 1980, people living on the banks of the Iratapuru River founded the village of São Francisco do Iratapuru in the hope of establishing a school which was accomplished in 1994. The economy of the village is based on gathering and extracting Brazil nuts. In 1992, COMARU, an agricultural cooperative, was set up to market their products.

In 1995, Governor João Capiberibe created the "Amapá Sustainable Development Program" (PDSA). In 1997, the Rio Iratapuru Sustainable Development Reserve was created which was aimed at both preserving nature as well as allowing for sustainable economic activities for the communities around the reserve. The village of São Francisco do Iratapuru is the main benefactor of the reserve.

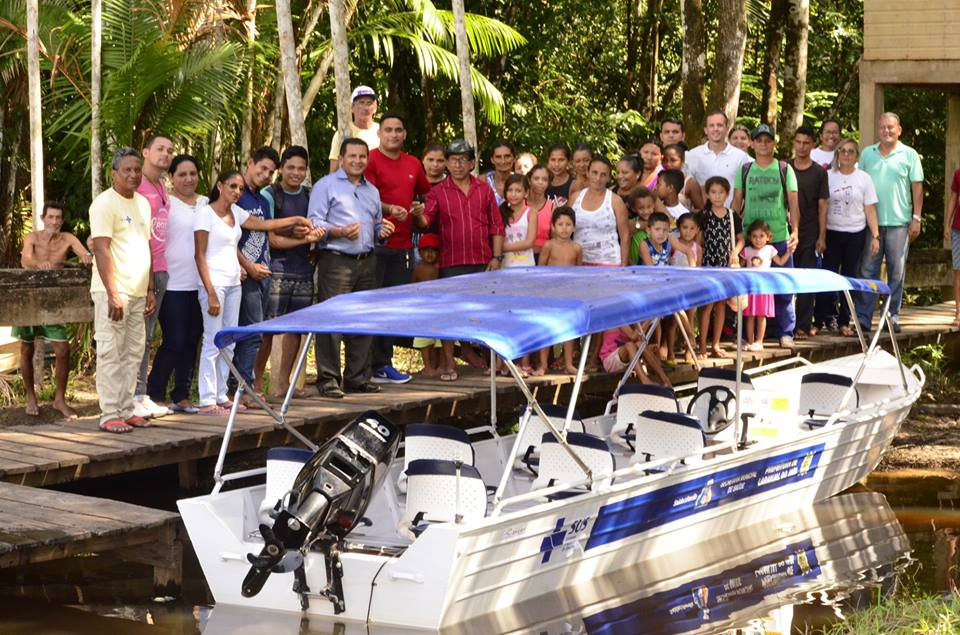
Speed boat

In 2002, Governor Waldez Góes was elected who was opposed to the PDSA, and withdrew all subsidies for the village. A 2003 arson of the biscuit factory further complicated matters, and by the end of 2003, COMARU was in serious financial problems. In 2004, the cosmetics company Natura & Co became interested, and signed a deal with COMARU to become one of their main suppliers for Brazil nut oil.

In 2018, São Francisco do Iratapuru received a speedboat, which can also be used for medical emergencies.

== Transport ==
São Francisco do Iratapuru can only be reached via the Jari River, however the Santo Antônio waterfall cannot be crossed. The only access route is taking the road from Monte Dourado to Porto Sabão and then continue the journey by boat.

== Bibliography ==
- Greissing, Anna; Kohler, Florent; Le Tourneau, François-Michel; Alves Picanço, José Reinaldo (2010). "A quest for sustainability: Brazil nut gatherers of São Francisco do Iratapuru and the Natura Corporation". Geographical Journal (in French). 176 (4): 334–349. doi:10.1111/j.1475-4959.2010.00366.x.
- Le Tourneau, François-Michel; Greissing, Anna; Kohler, Florent (2008). "São Francisco do Iratapuru : mécanismes de développement durable autour d'une activité traditionnelle" (in French). Duramaz.
