= German Amazon-Jary-Expedition (1935–1937) =

Nazi Germany expedition to Brazil

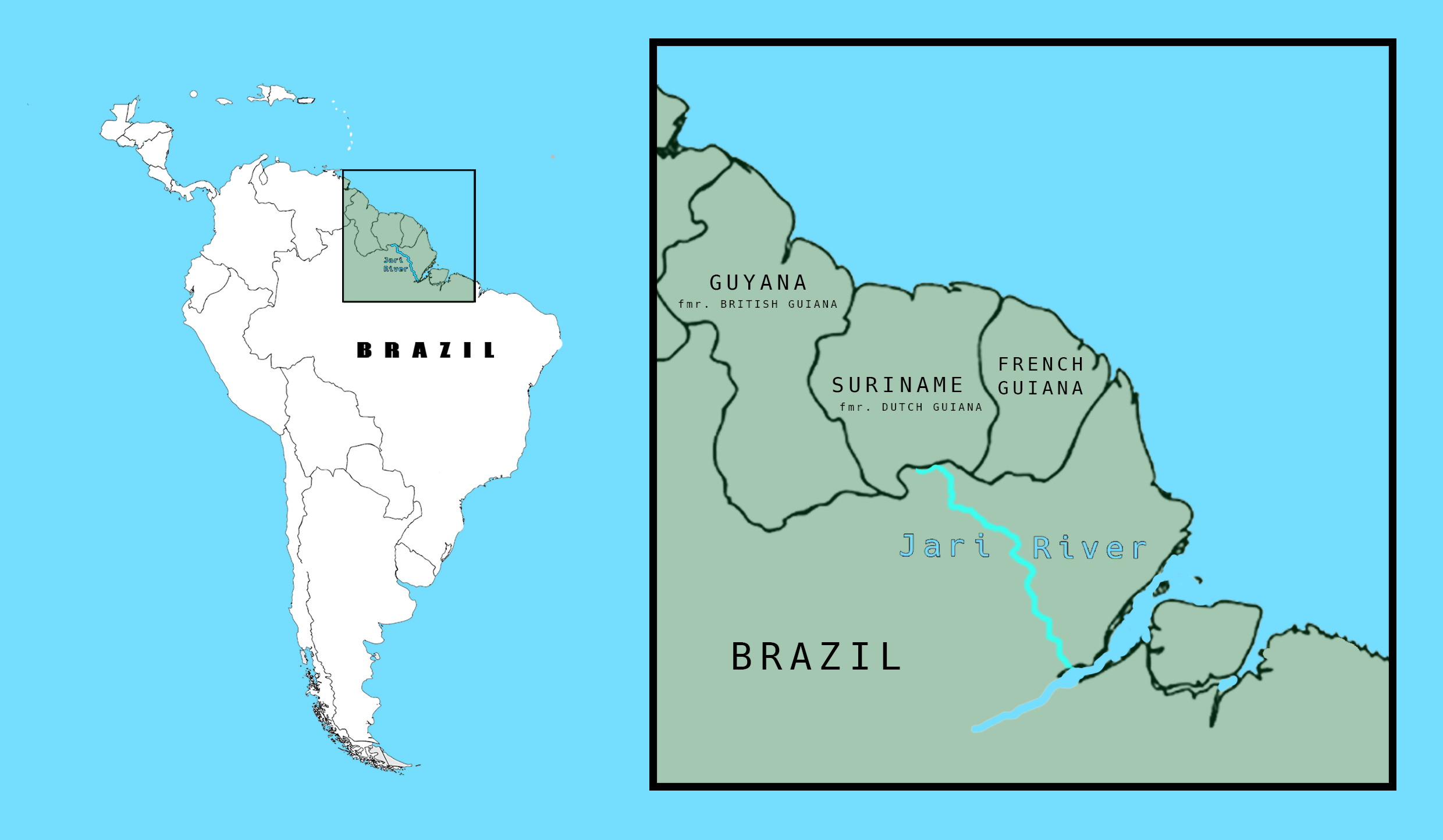
course of the Jari river

The German Amazon-Jary-Expedition (1935-1937) was a Nazi era scientific expedition in northern Brazil. The discovery of a huge cross emblazoned with swastika at the gravesite of one of the expedition members in the local jungle brought the event to renewed international attention during the 2010s. Unlike numerous successful and reputable field trips all over Brazil by German research teams from various academic backgrounds during the 1930s, the Amazon-Jary-Expedition was criticized for its political command, lack of academic necessities, and infatuation with the commercial multi-media chronicle, which lead to suspicions about its true purpose. This impression was further reinforced during the following years as other controversial Nazi Germany missions took place, criticized for its pseudo-scientific methods, unacceptable ethical standards, and affiliation with Nazi party agencies that sought support for their political agendas. The mission's leader had conceived plans for a military takeover of French Guiana (called the Guayana-Projekt), which, upon his return, he presented to Heinrich Himmler. However, there has been no evidence of any official involvement in or adoption of these plans.

== Background ==
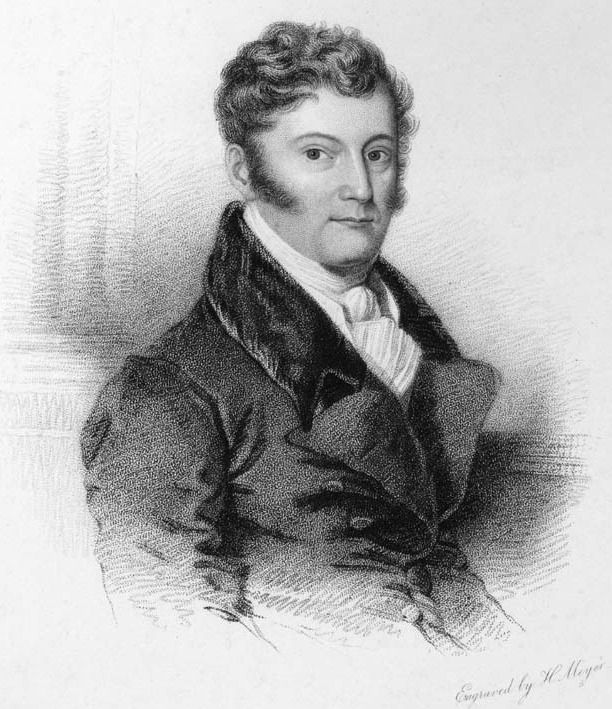
Prince Maximilian of Wied-Neuwied

Independent Brazil maintained friendly relations with Germany throughout the 19th and early 20th century, characterized by dynamic trade and the moderate but steady immigration process of ethnic Germans into (mainly) southern provinces. Sources provide varying numbers between 200,000 and 300,000 arrivals from 1824 to 1933. Prior to 1871 only very few settlers and even less merchants, scholars, religious missionaries and teachers of the small German states ever advanced to southern Brazil and establish themselves into the local Germanophone homogeneous communities. Brazil benefitted from Imperial Germany's greater political influence and economic ambitions. The vast territory absorbed the increasing numbers of scientific and technical personnel, that had set out to assess and extract resources and natural wealth. Brazil continued its policies of cooperation among growing trade, cultural exchange and economic progress until the Great depression and the Vargas Era.

From 1815 to 1817 Prince Maximilian of Wied-Neuwied led a pioneering expedition into south-eastern Brazil and crafted the earliest scientific work about the local indigenous peoples, such as the Botocudos. Upon his return to Europe he published his work in two volumes: Voyage to Brazil (Reise nach Brasilien) in 1821 and Contributions to Brazil's natural history (Beiträge zur Naturgeschichte von Brasilien) in 1833).

Behind growing economies and trade, Brazil and Germany developed a tradition of scientific cooperation. Many German naturalists, engineers and geologists arrived during the 19th and early 20th century in Brazil. Their expeditions and study and documentation of Brazil's land and nature set standards and many remain important works of reference for modern research. Among these travelers were Hans Krieg, the director of the Bavarian State Collection of Zoology, the researchers of the Institute of Tropical Diseases in Hamburg Gustav Giemsa and Ernst Nauck as well as the ornithologists Adolf Schneider and Helmut Sick.

== A vaguely described mission ==
The expedition was a cooperation of the German government, its Propaganda Ministry and the Nazi party's Foreign Organization (NSDAP/AO), under the auspices of the Kaiser Wilhelm Institute for Biology and the Brazilian government and the National Museum of Brazil in Rio de Janeiro. Atypically, the mission enjoyed nationwide press attention and approval among various circles in the Nazi hierarchy. Initially announced as another customary scientific survey, its goals were only vaguely described as journey out of scientific desire for knowledge to a blank spot on the map by its leader, zoologist, documentary filmmaker and SS officer Otto Schulz-Kampfhenkel.

== Preparations ==
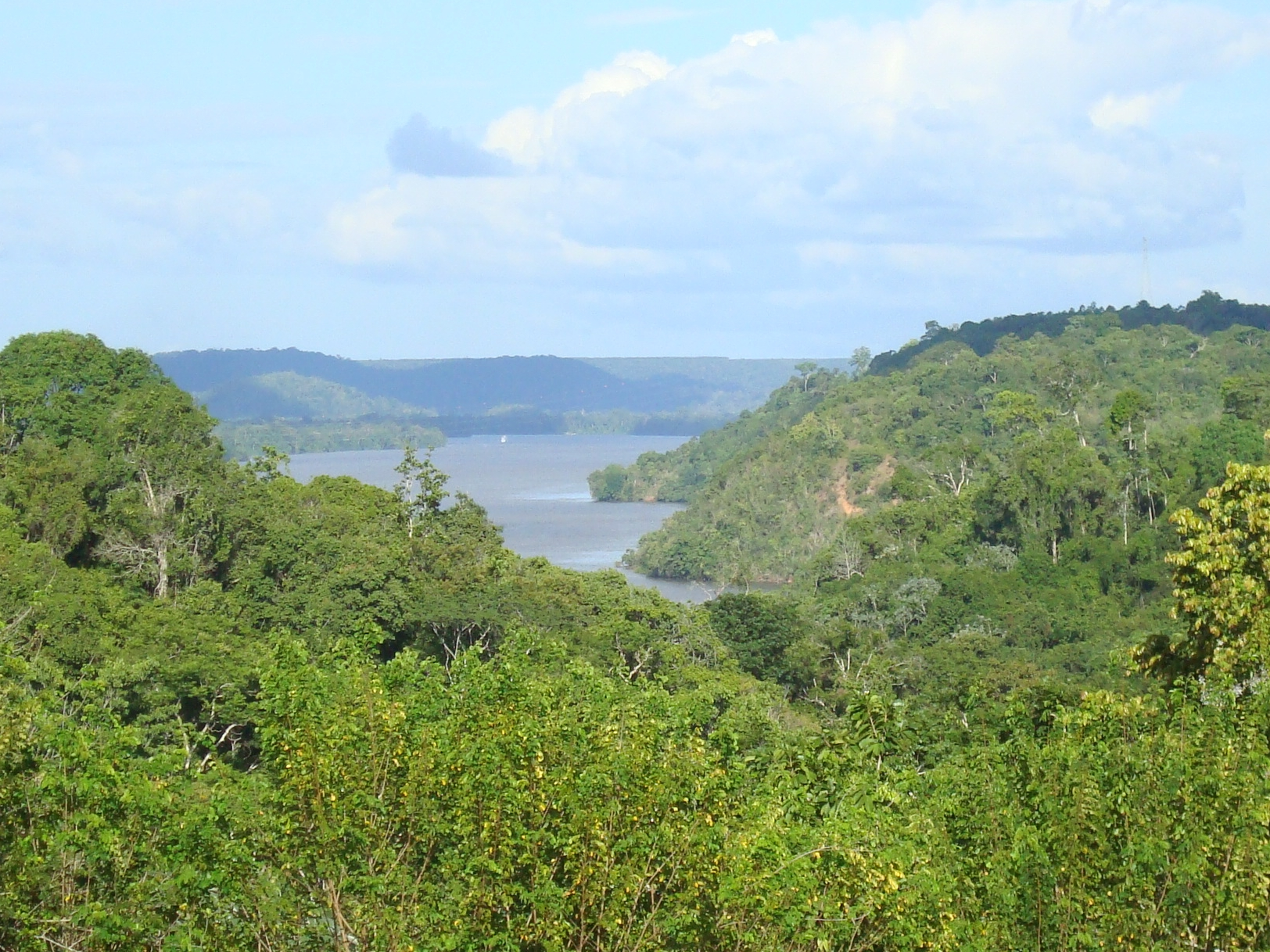
Lower Jari River near Monte Dourado, Almeirim, Pará

Schulz-Kampfhenkel, born in 1910 near Berlin as the son of an industrialist showed little interest in his family business. Young Otto collected insects, reptiles and other animals and his passion for zoology eventually led to a degree in biology. Already publicly known since the publication of his book Der Dschungel Rief... (The Jungle Calling...), the account of an expedition to Liberia in 1931/32, he organized the expedition to the 790 km (490 mi) long Amazon tributary Rio Jari (also Jary) in the Amazon basin.

Promoted to SS Untersturmführer, 24-year-old Otto Schulz-Kampfhenkel set foot on Brazilian soil in July 1935 as head of the expedition, accompanied by experienced pilot Gerd Kahle and engineer and mechanic Gerhard Krause. A modern Heinkel He 72 Kadett seaplane was to make exploring the region easier.

== The expedition ==
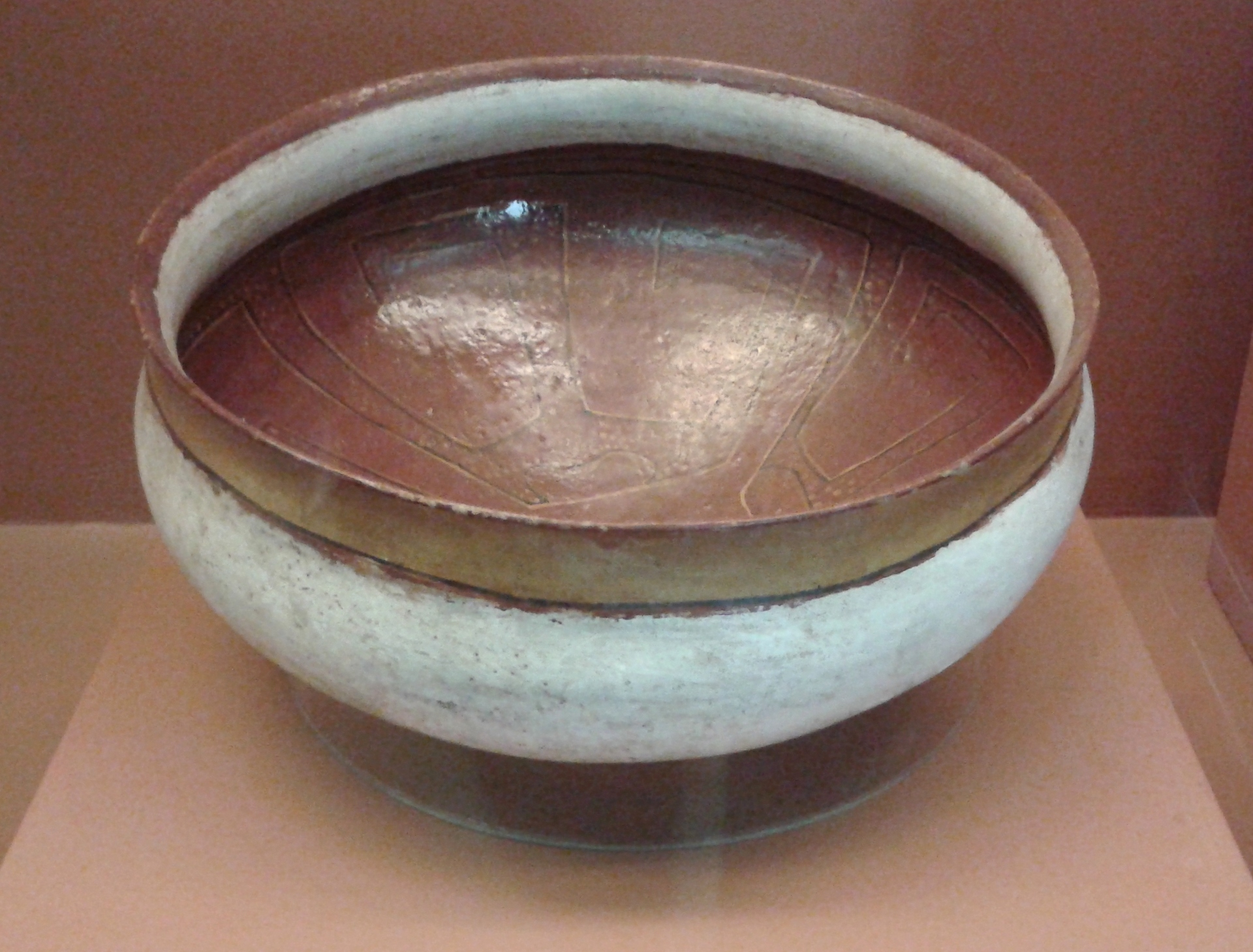
Apari ceramic

After the recruitment of many helpers, among them a German, Joseph Greiner, the expedition set off from their base camp at the Santo Antonio waterfall near Santo Antônio da Cachoeira on six boats in the direction of French Guiana in early November and study, explore and map the topography of Brazil's north-eastern border area along a route of the Jari River to neighboring French Guiana. The advance to the border with French Guiana could only be realized with the help of the indigenous people, who knew the jungle and its rivers. An Indio from the Aparai people agreed to guide the explorers. Schulz-Kampfhenkel nicknamed him rather inappropriately Winnetou - after author Karl May's famous fictional character.

After only a few weeks the Heinkel seaplane crashed, colliding with driftwood on the Jary river and had to be returned to the base. All men fell ill with malaria, Schulz-Kampfhenkel also suffered severe diphtheria and foreman Greiner eventually succumbed to his fever. His grave site in Laranjal do Jari municipality is marked with the huge swastika topped Jari-Cross. Upon arrival at the upper Jari River the mission set up camp near an Aparai settlement, explored the jungle, its fauna and collected zoological specimen. They also observed and documented the culture of the Indians and recorded their language, traditional chants and dances with a recording device.

After around 17 months, the expedition returned to Germany in May 1937 with 2,700 m film, thousands of animal bones and Indian tools and artefacts. Thanks to the dugout canoes and excellent navigation skills of the Indians in the rapids of the Rio Jary was it possible for the expedition to safely reach the base camp after almost two years. Exhibits in several cities took place. Several mammalian skulls of the Schulz-Kampfhenkel Collection can still be seen in the Natural History Museum of Berlin's Humboldt University.

== Consequences ==
Wayana settlements in Suriname, French Guiana and the northernmost villages in Brazil.

Schulz-Kampfhenkel utilized his multi-media data, recordings and documentation for the publication and professional marketing of his book The riddle of hell's jungle, published in 1938 and UFA Films launched the eponymous 90-minute full featured film, which was shown for weeks in cinemas nationwide. A great success and extremely popular at the time, despite its commercial composition, it remains a valuable anthropological document to this day. Among the upper waters of the Rio Jary the film shows, Neolithic Digging stick planting methods of the Wayana and Wayapi Indians, who had previously been believed to have died out. The baking of flat-bread as well as the bartering between the two tribes is shown as well as the typical pile dwellings, the making music on mouth flutes made of deer bones or on nose flutes made of bamboo tubes.

== The Guayana-Project ==
Among the obvious inconsistencies foreign observers viewed the mission's objectives with suspicion as many argued Nazi Germany hoped to establish a strategic bridgehead in South America. Schulz-Kampfhenkel, however had developed this plan of intrusion and conquest on his own, which he submitted to SS Reichsführer Heinrich Himmler during World War II. He intended to conquer French Guiana, with only a few hundred men who were to be secretly smuggled into the country by submarines and the help of the local Indians. Workers from Africa, practically slaves, were to later make the land arable. This is where German colonists, as representatives of the Nordic race should gain a foothold and gain a living space upon National Socialist demand. But Himmler declined, as other projects had priority.

In April 1938, the Vargas regime effectively prohibited the existence and activities of foreign parties within Brazil. Despite the diplomatic threats of the German embassy, future Nazi missions had to be conducted undercover, that led to the end of major activities. Only the large wooden cross remains in the Amazon jungle as a reminder of the expedition.

== See also ==
- German Antarctic Expedition (1938–1939)
- 1938–39 German expedition to Tibet
