= Otto Schulz =

Otto Schulz may refer to:

- Otto Eugen Schulz (1874–1936), German botanist
- Otto Schulz (pilot) (1911–1942), German fighter pilot and flying ace of World War II
- Otto Schulz (admiral) (1900–1974), German Konteradmiral and sea commander
- Otto Schulz-Kampfhenkel (1910–1989), German geographer, explorer, writer and film producer
