= Rio Iratapuru Sustainable Development Reserve =

Sustainable development reserve in Brazil

- Reserva de Desenvolvimento Sustentável do Rio Iratapuru
- IUCN category VI (protected area with sustainable use of natural resources)
- Location within Brazil
- Nearest city: Laranjal do Jari, Amapá
- Coordinates: 0°19′05″N 52°43′29″W
- Area: 806,184 hectares (1,992,120 acres)
- Designation: Sustainable development reserve
- Created: 11 December 1997
- Administrator: Secretaria de Estado do Meio Ambiente do Amapá

The Rio Iratapuru Sustainable Development Reserve (Portuguese: Reserva de Desenvolvimento Sustentável do Rio Iratapuru) is a sustainable development reserve in the state of Amapá, Brazil. It contains a well-preserved area of terra firme forest with rich fauna. The local communities that surround the reserve use it for sustainable extraction of products such as Brazil nuts.

== Location ==
The Rio Iratapuru (Note: The name "Iratapuru" is derived from "Uirapuru" (musician wren), a bird native to the Amazon that is the subject of many legends. This in turn comes from the Tupi-Guarani term wirapu'ru.) Sustainable Development Reserve is divided between the municipalities of Laranjal do Jari (69.01%), Mazagão (18.68%) and Pedra Branca do Amapari (12.1%) in Amapá. It has an area of 806,184 hectares (1,992,120 acres). The Jari River forms the western boundary. The Iratapuru River, a tributary of the Jari, crosses the reserve from north to south and is fed by many tributaries.

The reserve is bounded by the Waiãpi Indigenous Territory to the north and part of the Jari Ecological Station to the south. The Amapá State Forest adjoins the reserve to the east. The Jari River also forms the western boundary of the Tumucumaque Mountains National Park, just north of the reserve. The Rio Cajari Extractive Reserve is to the southeast. The reserve is important to the Amapá Corridor as a link between these conservation units.

== History ==
The reserve was an initiative of the Amapá state government to support sustainable production by the Comaru Brazil nut cooperative in the unoccupied land covered by the reserve. Five surrounding communities asked to participate. The Rio Iratapuru Sustainable Development Reserve was created by law 392 of 11 December 1997. The reserve was created by state governor João Capiberibe at the time that the Amapá Sustainable Development Program (PDSA) was being created. This was nine years before the national policy for sustainable development of traditional people and communities was defined.

On 16 February 2012 the company Natura Inovação e Tecnologia de Produtos was authorized to access traditional knowledge for the purpose of bio-prospecting and technical development under the "Perfume do Brasil" project. The 24 members of the management board of the reserve were appointed by the Secretary of State for the Environment (SEMA) on 19 May 2013, sixteen years after the reserve was created. As of 2016 the reserve was covered by the Amazon Region Protected Areas Program (ARPA).

== Environment ==
The reserve is in the Guiana Shield, with rocks that date to over 2 billion years ago. The terrain is very rugged, with hills and plateaus dissected by streams. Soil is mostly oxisol, with low natural fertility and low to medium vulnerability to erosion. In the Jari River Basin as a whole, which includes the reserve, deforestation is just 0.48%. Vegetation in the reserve is mainly terra firme forest, with small patches of other types of vegetation. There is some flooded forest in narrow strips along watercourses. Quick surveys of flora have identified 398 plant species in 78 families. Emergent trees of around 43 metres (141 ft) in height have been observed. Some tree trunks have diameters over 2 metres (6 ft 7 in).

There is great diversity of fauna, including rare and endangered such as the giant anteater, giant otter and jaguar. 41 mammal species have been recorded from 36 genera, including 8 primates. Of small mammals the most common are Proechimys spiny rat species and the brown four-eyed opossum (Metachirus nudicaudatus). 41 species of bats have been found; the flat-faced fruit-eating bat (Artibeus planirostris) is the most common. At least 164 species of fish are present, and there are almost certainly many more. A total of 376 bird species in 61 families have been listed. The bird population in the north of the reserve seems to have been affected by garimpo mining. 54 species of amphibians have been recorded and 67 of reptiles. Two of the amphibians and one lizard were previously unknown. The threatened poisonous frog Atelopus spumarius has been reported.

Potential threats identified by a technical mission of the Guiana Shield Facility in April 2008 included logging, mining, road building, human settlements and agricultural development. Illegal small-scale mining, mostly in the northeast, causes water pollution with mercury, a major problem. Mining is mainly concentrated along the rivers and near the BR-210 highway to the northeast of the reserve. As of 2013 the harvest of Brazil nuts was declining, perhaps due to poor regeneration and over-harvesting by the growing human population. The hydroelectric plant at Santo Antônio do Cachoeira which was completed in 2014 will cause pressures on the environment.

== Economy ==
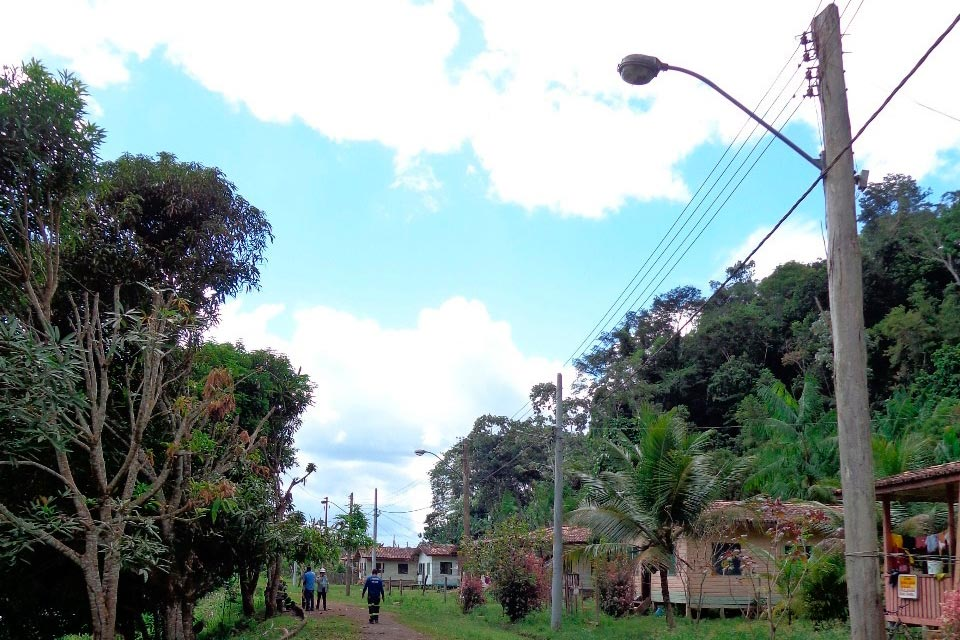
A rural community near the reserve

As of 2013 there were 175 families in nine communities around the reserve. Communities along the Cupixi River in the north are Vila Cupixi, São Raimundo and São Miguel do Cupixi. Communities along the Jari River in the south are Retiro, Padaria, São José, Santo Antônio da Cachoeira, São Francisco do Iratapuru and Comunidade do S. The residents on these communities may legally use the reserve's natural resources.

SEMA, which manages the reserve, restricts human activities to hunting, fishing, Brazil nut collection, subsistence farming and ecotourism. The users collect Brazil nuts, andiroba, copaiba and camu-camu. 5% of the reserve is used for extraction. The Cooperative of Rio Iratapuru Producers and Extracters has certified seven areas totalling 32,000 hectares (79,000 acres) with the SmartWood label for extraction of Brazil nut, copaiba oil and breu branco (white resin). The aromatic Breu branco is extracted sustainably from the Protium heptaphyllum tree. It is used by the forest residents for its medicinal properties, and is used commercially for perfumes and soaps.

The management board includes representatives of:

Government
- Secretaria de Estado do Meio Ambiente (SEMA)
- Instituto de Desenvolvimento Rural do Amapá (Rurap)
- Instituto do Meio Ambiente e de Ordenamento Territorial do Amapá (IMAP)
- Ministério Público do Estado do Amapá
- Prefeitura Municipal de Laranjal do Jari
- Câmara Municipal de Laranjal do Jari
Civil society
- Cooperativa Mista dos Produtores e extrativistas do Rio Iratapuru (Comaru)
- Associação dos Produtores Agroextrativistas da Comunidade da Cachoeira de Santo Antônio (APAECC)
- Associação dos Moradores e Produtores Agroextrativistas da Comunidade da Padaria (AMACP)
- Comunidade São Miguel do Cupixi
- Conselho das Aldeias Indígena Wajãpi (APINA)
- Fundação Jari

== Sources ==
- "Breu Branco Resin - White Breu", Rainforest Chica
- Clark, Nathália (6 August 2010), Reserva do Iratapuru antenada com o mundo (in Portuguese), WWF Brasil
- Conselho Gestor da Reserva de Desenvolvimento Sustentável do Rio Iratapuru (AP) é empossado (in Portuguese), ARPA
- Full list: PAs supported by ARPA, ARPA
- RDS Rio Iratapuru, Guiana Shield Facility, 2012
- RDS do Rio Iratapuru (in Portuguese), ISA: Instituto Socioambiental
