= Monte Dourado Airport =

Airport in Pará, Brazil

Serra do Areão Airport Aeroporto da Serra do Areão
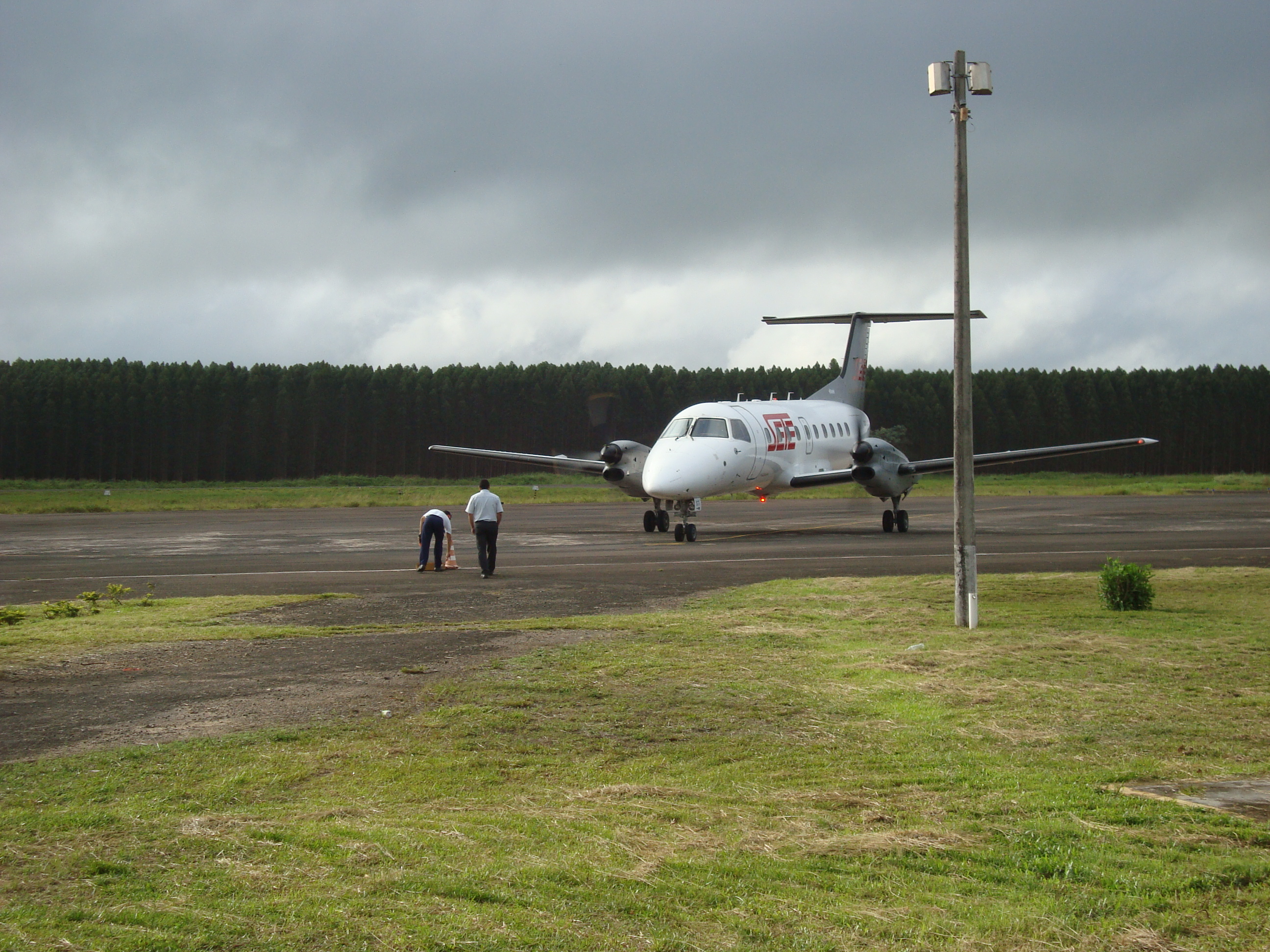
- IATA: MEU; ICAO: SBMD; LID: PA0009

Summary
- Airport type: Public
- Serves: Monte Dourado (Almeirim)
- Time zone: BRT (UTC−03:00)
- Elevation AMSL: 206 m (676 ft)
- Coordinates: 00°53′23″S 052°36′08″W

Map
- Location in Brazil MEU (Brazil)

Runways
Direction	Length		Surface
Direction	m	ft	Surface
08/26	1,800	5,906	Asphalt
- Sources: ANAC, DECEA

Serra do Areão Airport (IATA: MEU, ICAO: SBMD) is the airport serving the district of Monte Dourado in Almeirim, Brazil.

== History ==
The airport was built as a support facility to Jari project.

== Airlines and destinations ==
Airlines	Destinations
Azul Conecta	Almeirim, Belém

== Access ==
The airport is located 12 km (7 mi) from downtown Monte Dourado and 73 km (45 mi) from downtown Almeirim.

== See also ==
- List of airports in Brazil
