= Jari Ecological Station =

- IUCN category Ia (strict nature reserve)
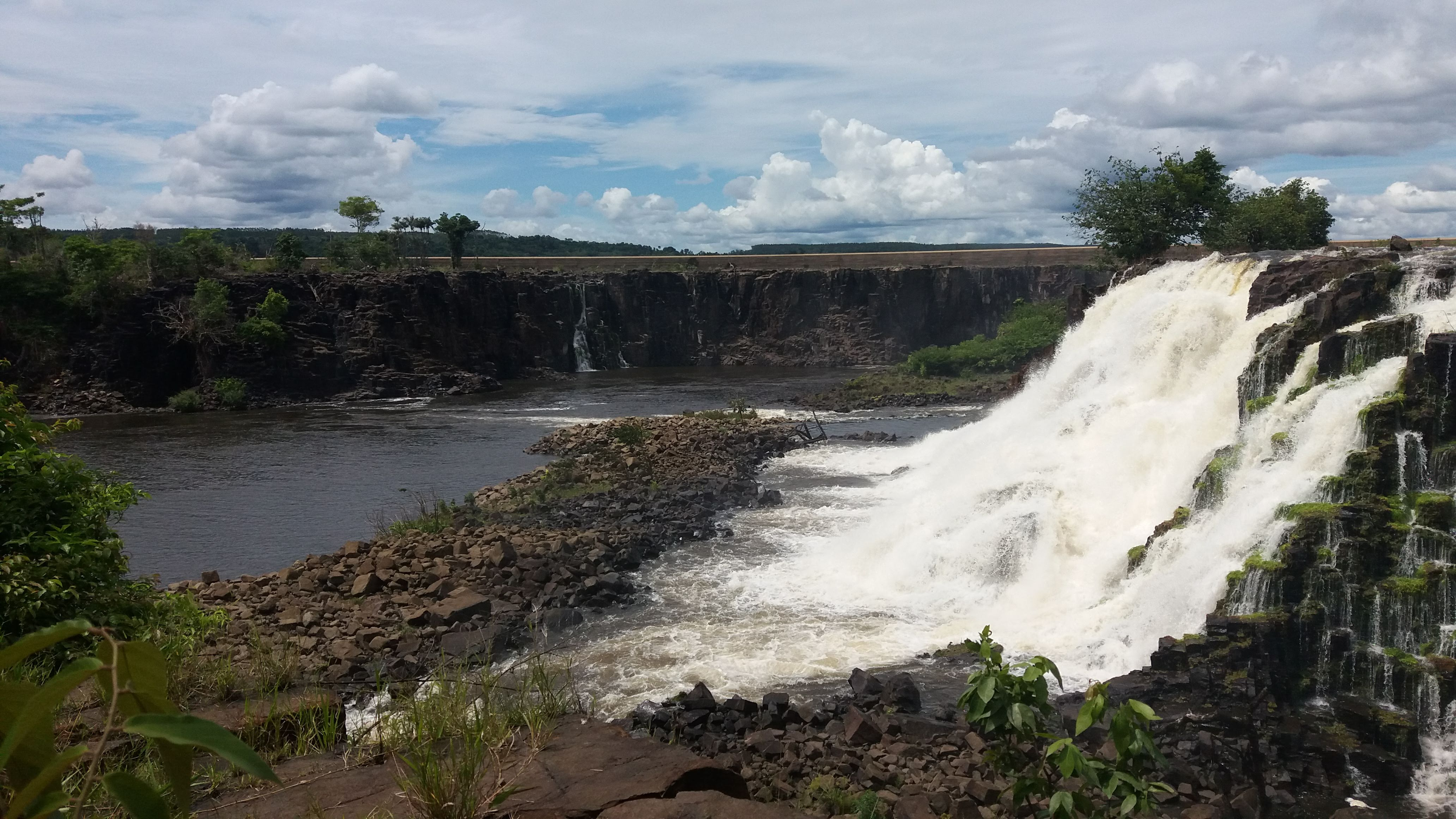

- Location within Brazil
- Nearest city: Munguba, Pará
- Coordinates: 0.513°S 52.692°W
- Area: 227,126 hectares (561,240 acres)
- Designation: Ecological station
- Created: 12 April 1982
- Governing body: ICMBio

Jari Ecological Station (Portuguese: Estação Ecológica do Jari) is an ecological station in Brazil, located in the states of Amapá and Pará, created in 1984.

== Location ==
The Jari Ecological Station lies in the municipalities of Almeirim, Pará, and Mazagão, Amapá. It has an areas of 227,126 hectares (561,240 acres). It lies in the Uatuma-Trombetas moist forests ecoregion of the Amazon biome. Altitude varies from 80 to 400 metres (260 to 1,310 ft). The Jari River drains the eastern part and the Paru River drains the south west part. In north west the main watercourse is the Carecuru River. The reserve is bounded by the Paru State Forest to the north, and the Rio Iratapuru Sustainable Development Reserve to the northeast.

== Environment ==
Temperature ranges from 18 to 29 °C (64 to 84 °F). The vegetation is mainly land forest. Emergent trees reach 60 metres (200 ft). The protected unit is in excellent condition. There are traces of two old mines, which caused some changes to the landscape. Small numbers of people have settled along the Jarí River, which flows through the unit, built houses and cleared fields. The climate is hot and humid, with high annual rainfall. Flora and fauna are typical of tropical rainforest. Illegal gold prospecting occurs in the areas around the unit and pose the greatest threat through water pollution and hunting of local fauna, particularly mammals.

== History ==
The Jari Ecological Station was created by federal decree 87.092 of 12 April 1982, with an area of 207,370 hectares (512,400 acres). It is administered by the Chico Mendes Institute for Biodiversity Conservation. The Ecological Station is a "strict nature reserve" under IUCN protected area category Ia. The purpose is to preserve the ecosystem and to support research and environmental education. It is part of the Amapá Biodiversity Corridor, created in 2003.

The limits of the ESEC were altered by decree 89.440 of 13 April 1984. The consultative council was created on 27 February 2014. As of 2016 it was supported by the Amazon Region Protected Areas Program.

== Sources ==
- Corredor de Biodiversidade do Amapá Biodiversity Corridor (PDF), Belém: CI-Brasil, Governo do Amapá, Fundação Lee & Gund, 2007
- EE do Jari (in Portuguese), WWF-Brasil Protected Areas Observatory, archived from the original on 2016-03-03
- ESEC do Jari (in Portuguese), ISA: Instituto Socioambiental
- Estação Ecológica do Jari (in Portuguese), Chico Mendes Institute for Biodiversity Conservation, archived from the original on 2015-04-15
- Figueiredo, João (13 March 1984), "DECRETO Nº 89.440, DE 13 DE MARÇO DE 1984", Brazilian Federal Senate (in Portuguese), Brazilian Government
- Full list: PAs supported by ARPA, ARPA
- Sears, Robin, Northern South America: Northeastern Brazil, into southern Guyana and Suriname (NT0173), WWF: World Wildlife Fund
- Unidade de Conservação: Estação Ecológica do Jari (in Portuguese), MMA: Ministério do Meio Ambiente
