= Ajuruxi River =

- Location within Brazil
- Native name: Rio Ajuruxi (Portuguese)

Location
- Country: Brazil

Physical characteristics
- Mouth
  - coordinates: 0.537259°S 51.536203°W

Basin features
- River system: Amazon River

The Ajuruxi River (Portuguese: Rio Ajuruxi) is a river in the state of Amapá, Brazil. It is a left tributary of the lower Amazon River.

The Ajuruxi River defines the northeastern boundary of the 501,771 hectares (1,239,900 acres) Rio Cajari Extractive Reserve, created in 1990.

== See also ==
- List of rivers of Amapá
