= Vitória do Jari =

Municipality in Amapá, Brazil

Vitória do Jari Beiradinho
- Municipality
- The Municipality of Vitória do Jari
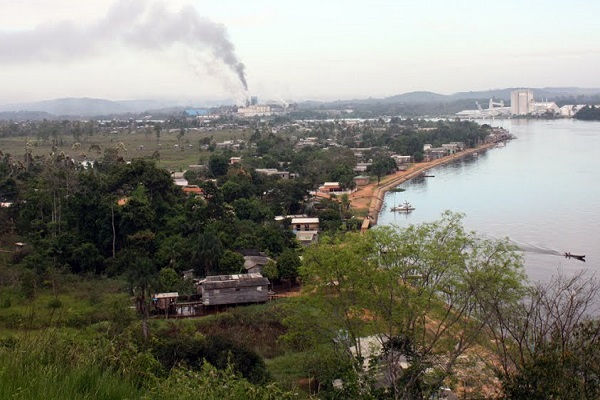

- Flag Coat of arms
- Nickname: "Beiradinho"
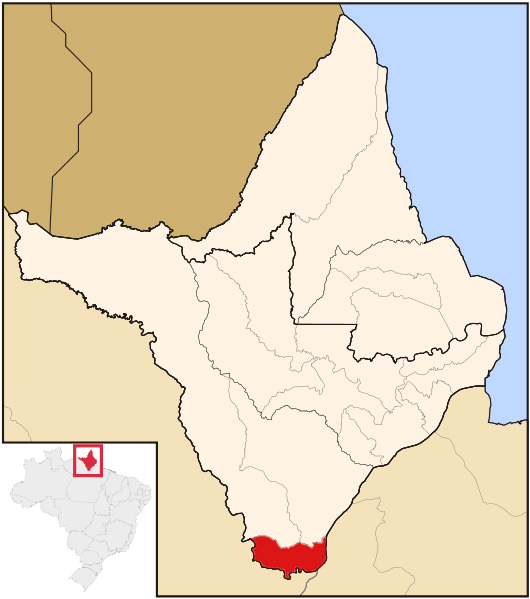
- Location of Vitória do Jari in the State of Amapá
- Coordinates: 0.9293°S 52.4264°W
- Country: Brazil
- Region: North
- State: Amapá
- Founded: 8 September 1994

Government
  - Mayor: Raimundo de Alcimar Ney de Souza (PT)

Area
  - Total: 2,509 km^{2} (969 sq mi)
- Elevation: 3.0 m (10 ft)

Population (2020)
  - Total: 16,254
  - Density: 6.478/km^{2} (16.78/sq mi)
- Time zone: UTC−3 (BRT)
- HDI (2000): 0.659 – medium

Vitória do Jari (Brazilian Portuguese pronunciation: [viˈtɔɾi.ɐ du ʒaˈɾi]; 'Jari's Victory') is a municipality located in the southernmost tip of the state of Amapá, Brazil. Its population is 16,254 and its area is 2,509 km^{2} (969 mi^{2}). Vitória do Jari has a population density of 5.9 inhabitants per square kilometer. The town is located on the Jari River on the other side of Munguba, and was originally called Beiradinho.

== History ==
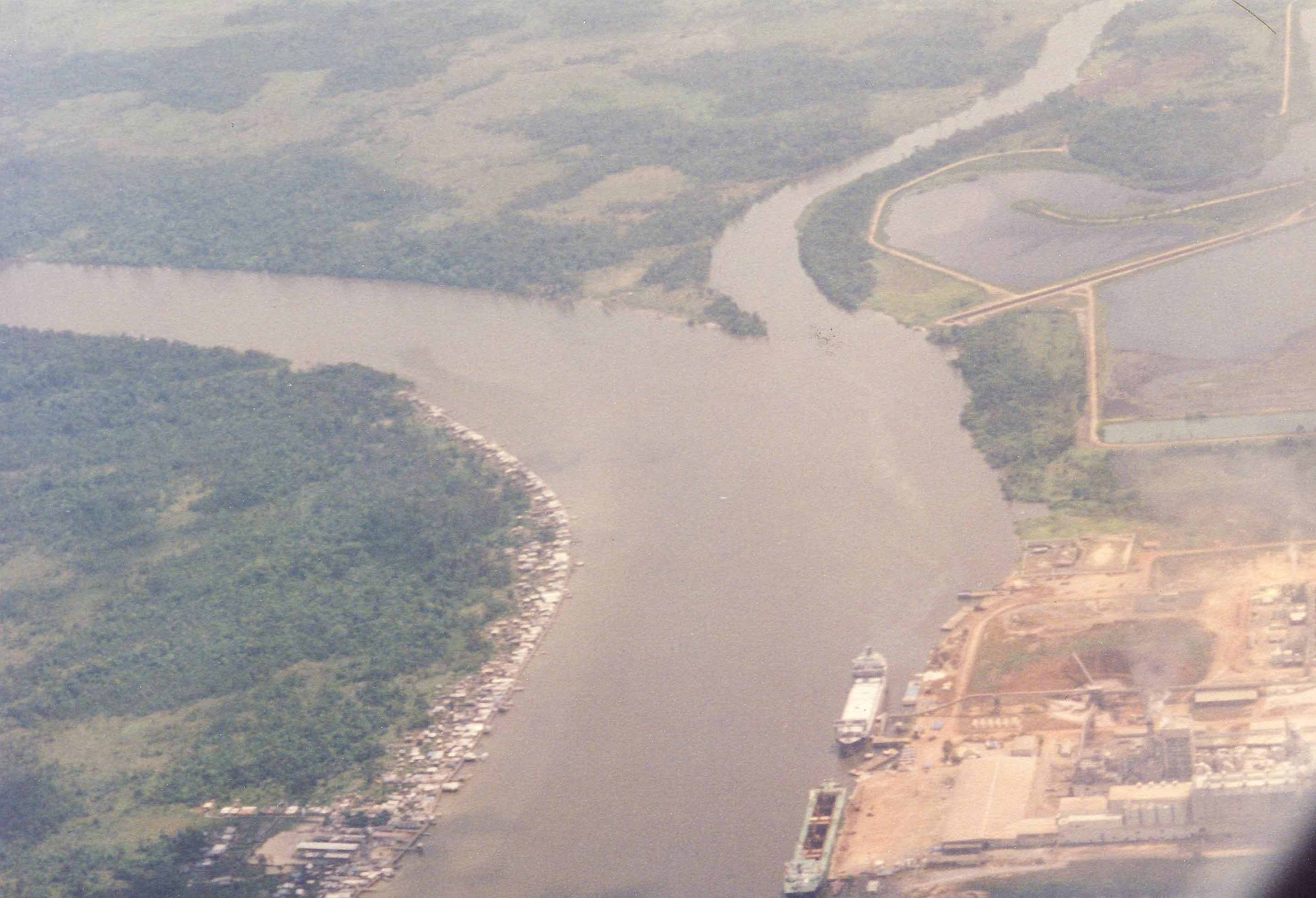
Celulose plant in Munguba and Vitória do Jari on the Jari River (1995)

The town started as a shanty town for the Jari project. It was originally called Beiradinho. People in the informal economy who worked in Munguba could not afford housing in the Munguba or Monte Dourado. In 1994, the town was renamed Vitória do Jari and became an independent municipality.

== Geography ==
=== Nature ===
The municipality contains 17% of the 501,771-hectare (1,239,900-acre) Rio Cajari Extractive Reserve, created in 1990.

== Economy ==
The economy is based on agricultural with an emphasis on corn, bananas, and watermelons, and cattle and buffalo ranches. CADAM, a kaolin mining company is a major employer in the region.

== Jarilândia ==
Jarilândia is the location where Gmelina arborea was planted on a large scale for the pulp industry as part of the Jari project. In 1969, planting began, but soon the trees failed to grow. The project was cancelled in 1982.
