= Almeirim Airport =

Almeirim Airport Aeroporto de Almeirim
- IATA: GGF; ICAO: SNYA; LID: PA0024

Summary
- Airport type: Public
- Serves: Almeirim
- Time zone: BRT (UTC−03:00)
- Elevation AMSL: 178 m (584 ft)
- Coordinates: 01°28′45″S 052°34′41″W

Map
- Location in Brazil GGF (Brazil)

Runways
Direction	Length		Surface
Direction	m	ft	Surface
06/24	1,200	3,397	Gravel
- Sources: ANAC, DECEA

Almeirim Airport (IATA: GGF, ICAO: SNYA) is the airport serving Almeirim, located in the Pará state of Brazil.

== Airlines and destinations ==
Airlines	Destinations
Azul Conecta	Belém, Monte Dourado

== Access ==
The airport is located 5 km (3 mi) north of Almeirim.

== See also ==
- List of airports in Brazil
