= Park Cinq =

Apartment building in Manhattan, New York

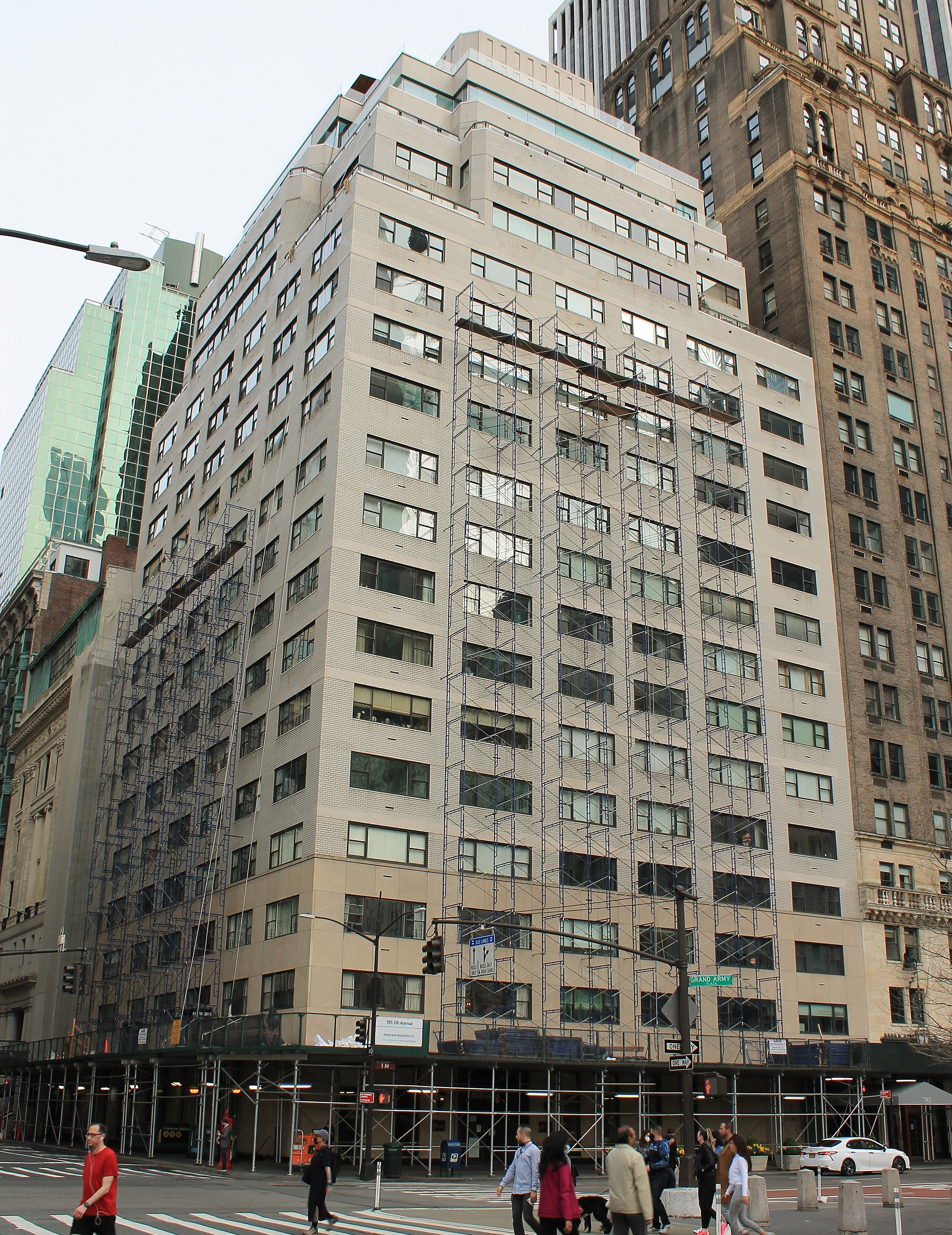
- Alternative names: Park V

General information
- Address: 785 Fifth Avenue; 2 East 60th Street
- Town or city: Lenox Hill, Manhattan, New York City
- Country: United States
- Coordinates: 40°45′52.5″N 73°58′20.61″W
- Completed: 1963
- Owner: Fifth Avenue And 60th Street Corporation

Height
- Architectural: 200 ft (61 m)
- Roof: 190 ft (58 m)

Technical details
- Floor count: 18
- Floor area: 174,780 sq ft (16,238 m^{2})
- Lifts/elevators: 5

Design and construction
- Architecture firm: Emery Roth & Sons
- Developer: Fisher Brothers

785 Fifth Avenue, usually called the Park Cinq (Park-V), is a luxury cooperative apartment building on the Upper East Side of Manhattan in New York City. It is located at 785 Fifth Avenue, at the southeast corner with 60th Street, across from Central Park and Grand Army Plaza.

== History ==
The eighteen-story building was constructed by the Fisher Brothers developers in 1960. The Park Cinq shares its Fifth Avenue block with the Sherry Netherland Hotel. The building has eighteen stories and a penthouse. The upper floors offer "sweeping Central Park views."

The year the building opened, the New York Times described it as containing sixty-six "mansions," and described it as being "the world's most luxurious multiple dwelling." Among the luxury details considered remarkable in that era were the presence of telephone outlets in every room and special windows designed to keep out noise. There were also marble bathrooms and parquet floors, but the entire building was in modern style unlike the traditional Renaissance and Georgian styles of older buildings in the neighborhood. The building's dedication was attended by Prince and Princess Serge Belosselsky-Belozersky.

Notable residents have included David Geffen, Denise Rich, and Robert A. Daly. Shipping tycoon Daniel K. Ludwig lived in the penthouse when the building first opened.
