= Laranjal do Jari =

Municipality in Amapá, Brazil

- Municipality
- The Municipality of Laranjal do Jari
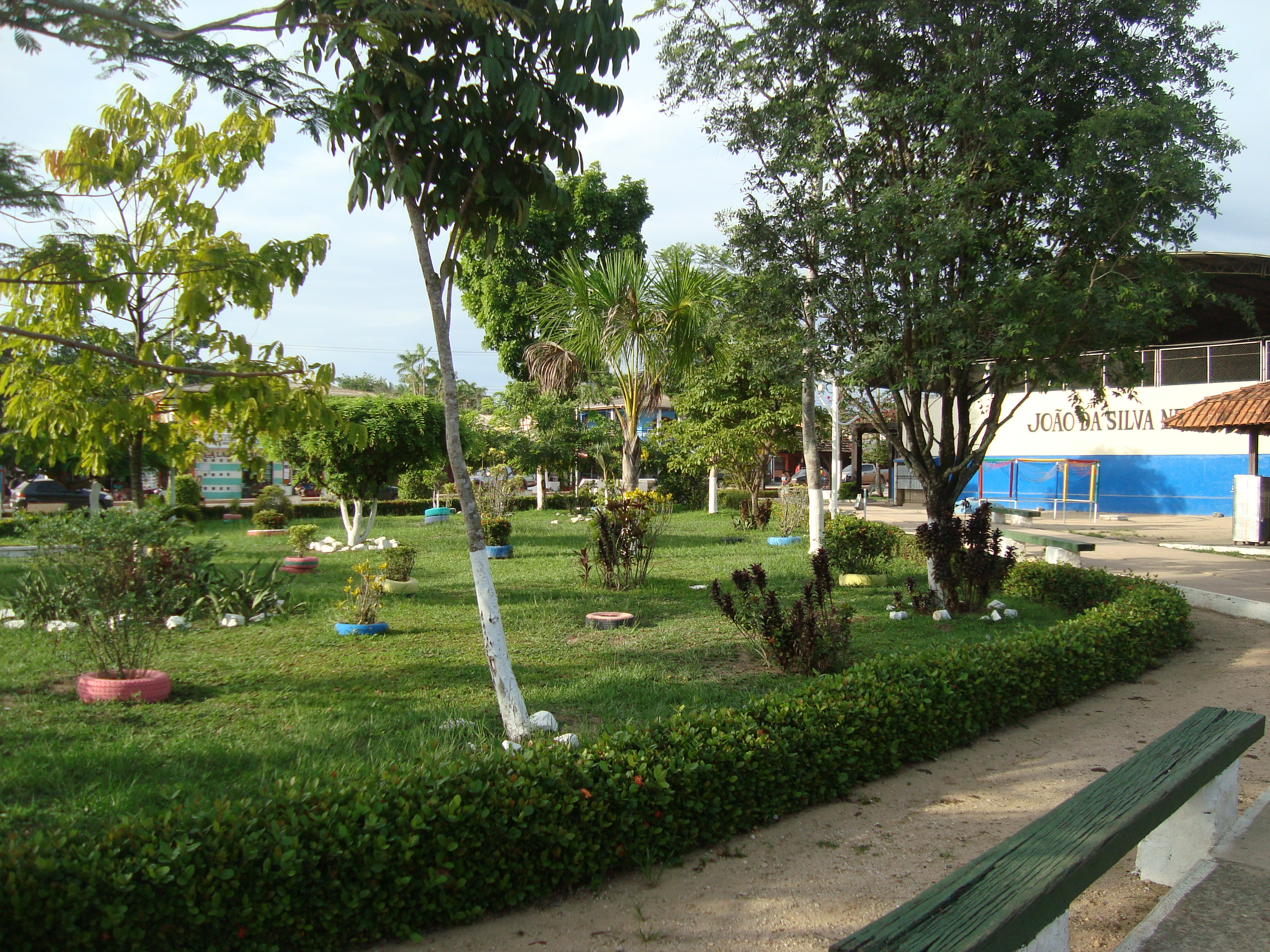

- Flag Seal
- Nickname: "Beiradão" (Big Edge, because of the city's large boundary and its location in the edge of Amapá.)
- Motto: "Laranjal com Responsabilidade" (Laranjal with Responsibility)
- Location of Laranjal do Jari in the State of Amapá
- Coordinates: 00°51′20″S 52°32′21″W
- Country: Brazil
- Region: North
- State: Amapá
- Founded: 17 December 1987

Government
  - Mayor: Márcio Serrão (PRB)

Area
  - Total: 30,783 km^{2} (11,885 sq mi)
- Elevation: 6.7 m (22 ft)

Population (2020)
  - Total: 51,362
  - Density: 1.6685/km^{2} (4.3214/sq mi)
- Time zone: UTC−3 (BRT)
- HDI (2000): 0.732 – medium
- Website: laranjaldojari.ap.gov.br

Laranjal do Jari (Brazilian Portuguese pronunciation: [laɾɐ̃ˈʒaw du ʒaˈɾi]; 'Jari Orangery') is a municipality located in the west of the state of Amapá, Brazil. It is the only municipality in the west boundaries of Amapá, except for a small part of Vitória do Jari. Its population is 35,114 and its area is 30,783 km^{2}, which makes it the largest municipality of Amapá.

== History ==
The land was originally inhabited by Amerindians. Later businessmen set up rubber plantations. The largest plantation was owned by José Júlio de Andrade who owned 35,000 square kilometres (14,000 sq mi) of land which made him the biggest landowner at the time. In 1948, his tenants revolted and he was forced to sell the land to Portuguese businessmen who sold it to Daniel K. Ludwig, an American billionaire, in 1964.

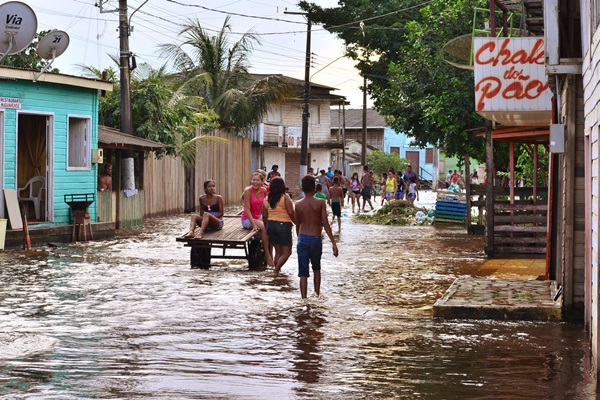
Flood in Laranjal do Jari (2018)

In 1967, Ludwig conceived the Jari project. He wanted to replace the rainforest with Gmelina arborea for the pulp industry. A planned city called Monte Dourado was built in Almeirim, however it was unable to provide housing for all the workers, and a shanty town called Beiradão emerged on the other side of the Jari River. The project turned into a major money losing failure, and in 1982, he sold the land.

In 1987, the land became an independent municipality, and Beiradão was renamed Laranjal do Jari. The city is still mainly a river slum and suffers from fires, floods, and open sewage.

== Transport ==
Laranjal do Jari is connected to the BR-156 and BR-210 highways. The city of Monte Dourado can be reached by ferry.

== Geography ==
=== Nature ===
The municipality contains 39% of the 501,771-hectare (1,239,900-acre) Rio Cajari Extractive Reserve, created in 1990. It also contains 69% of the 806,184-hectare (1,992,120-acre) Rio Iratapuru Sustainable Development Reserve, created in 1997. A part of the Tumucumaque Mountains National Park is located within the municipality.

== Indigenous peoples ==
The Wayampi Indigenous Territory is located in the municipality and is home to the Wayampi and Aparai people. The area inside Laranjal do Jari measures 3,592 square kilometres (1,387 sq mi). A group of Wayampi have settled along the Amapari and Anakui Rivers, however information about the group is very limited.

== Villages ==
- São Francisco do Iratapuru
