= Almeirim, Pará =

Municipality in Pará, Brazil

Almeirim
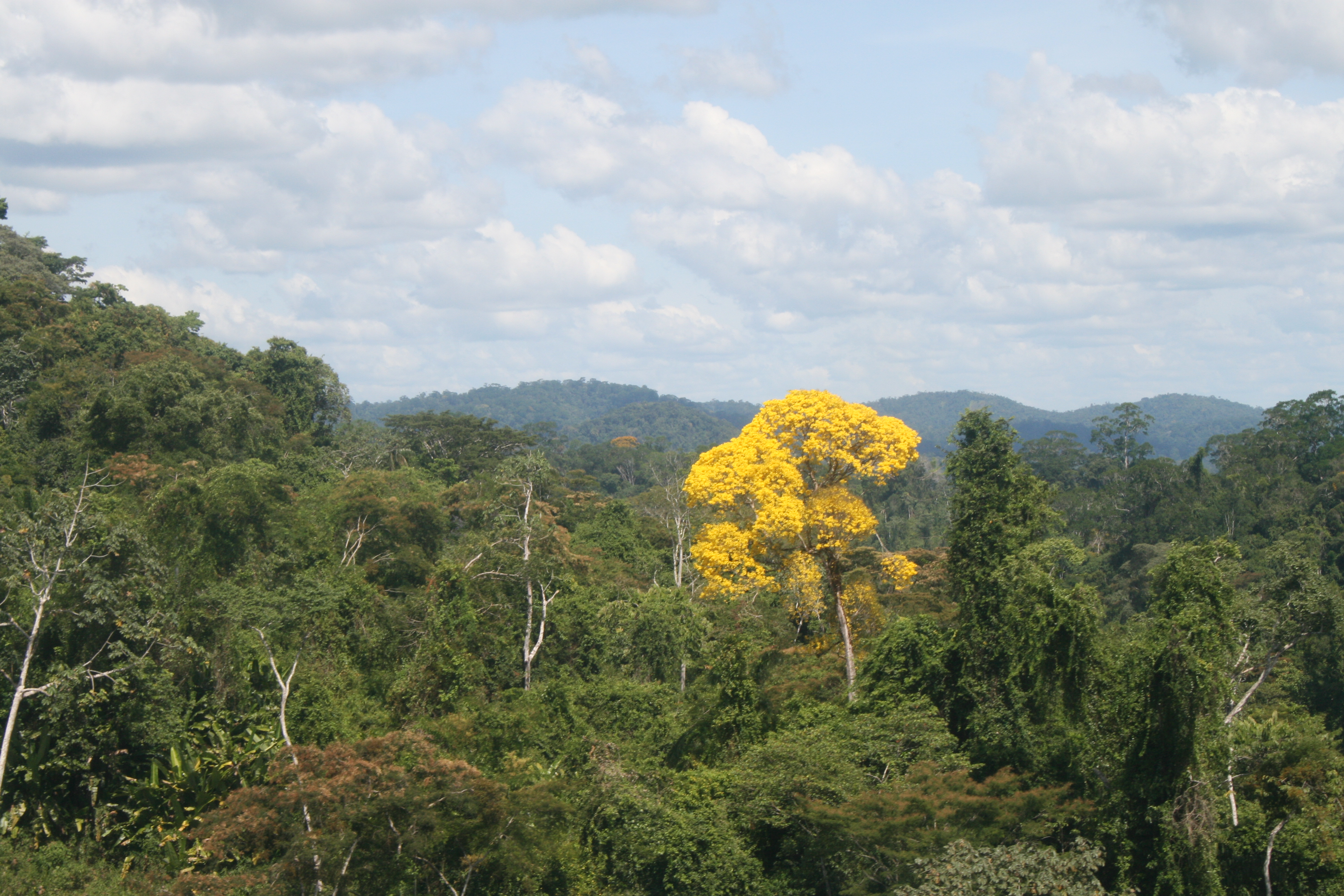

- Flag

- Location of Almeirim municipality in Pará
- Coordinates: 01°31′22″S 52°34′55″W
- Country: Brazil
- Region: Norte
- State: Pará

Area
  - Total: 72,960 km^{2} (28,170 sq mi)
- Elevation: 65 m (213 ft)

Population (2020)
  - Total: 34,076
  - Density: 0.5/km^{2} (1.3/sq mi)
- Time zone: UTC−3 (BRT)
- HDI (2000): 0.745 – medium
- Website: almeirim.pa.gov.br

Almeirim is a city on the Amazon and the northernmost municipality in the Brazilian state of Pará. It is also the fourth largest municipality in that state and the eighth largest in Brazil (by area). The municipality is crossed by the Equator.

== History ==
Almeirim was first inhabited by the Amerindians. Manoel da Mota e Siqueira constructed the Paru Fort which was designated a village in 1758, and named Almerim. In 1835, the Cabanagem Revolt started in Almeirim which resulted in widespread devastation. In 1890, Almeirim became an independent municipality. The Santo Antonio do Jari hydroelectric system is located on the Jari River and provides 373.4 MW of hydro electricity. Construction began in 2011 and was completed in 2014.

== Nature ==
The municipality includes a large part (94.49%) of the 11,518-square-kilometre (4,447 sq mi) Maicuru Biological Reserve. It also contains part of the Jari Ecological Station.

== Transport ==
The city is served by Almeirim Airport. Serra do Areão Airport located in the district of Monte Dourado 73 km away serves the population residing and working for the Jari project. The city of Laranjal do Jari in Amapá can be reached by ferry from Monte Dourado.

== Towns and villages ==
- Aldeia Bona
- Monte Dourado
- Munguba
- Suisuimënë

== Notable people ==
- Abuda (1989), footballer.
- Joelma (1974), singer.

== Gallery ==
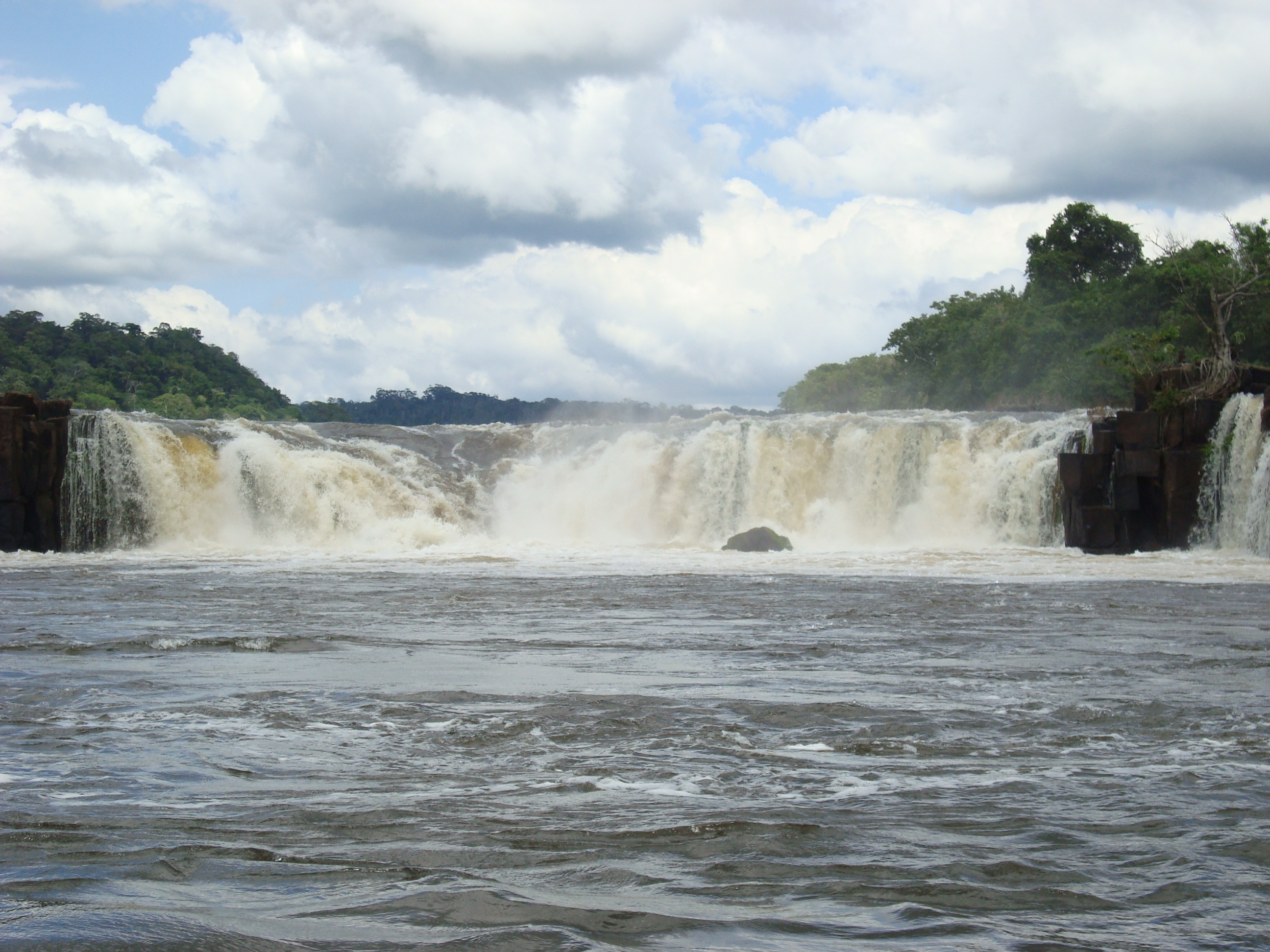
Panama Waterfalls, Paru River

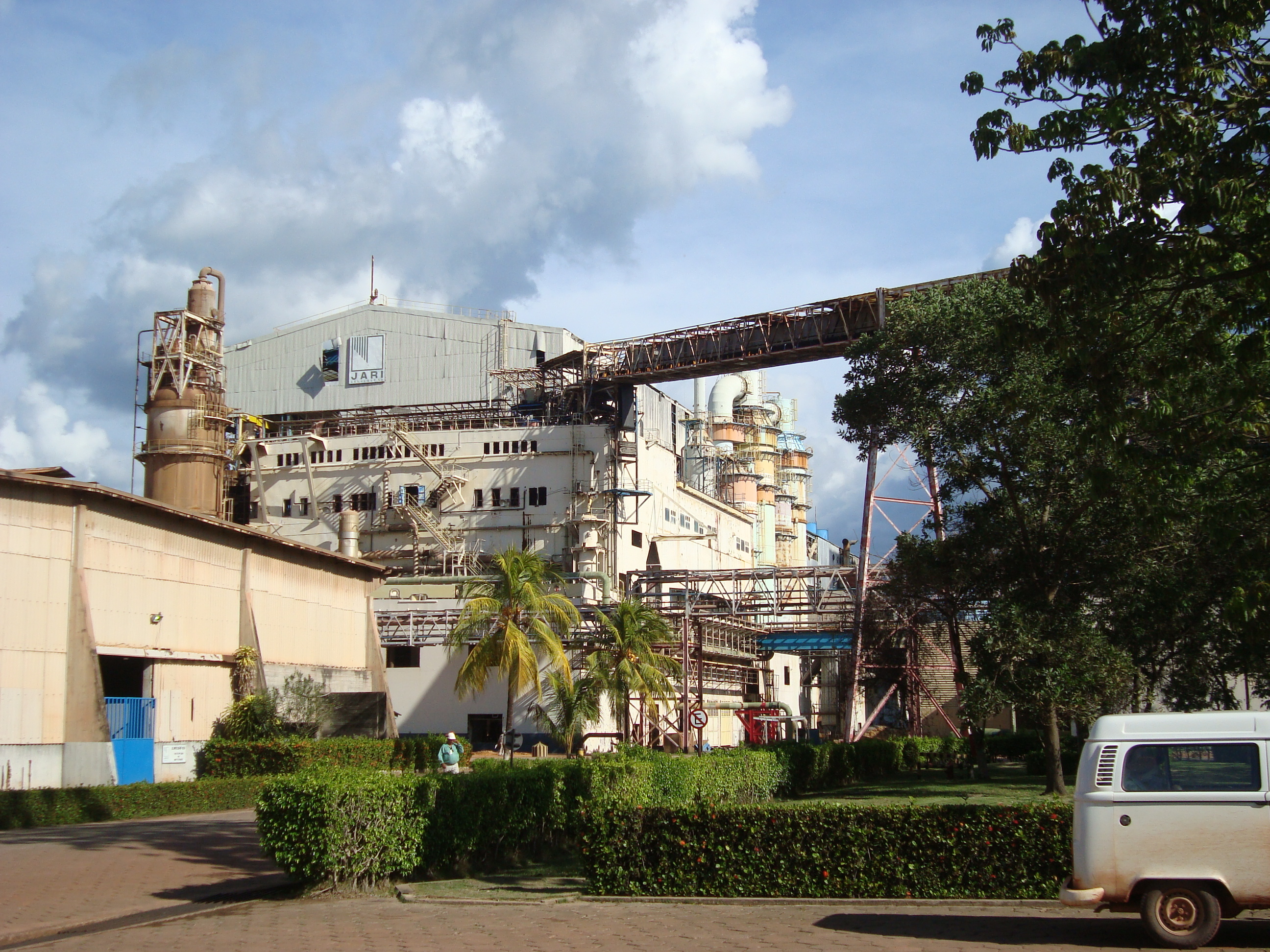
Cellulose factory, Jari project

== See also ==
- List of municipalities in Pará
