= Iratapuru River =

- Location within Brazil
- Native name: Rio Iratapuru (Portuguese)

Location
- Country: Brazil

Physical characteristics
- Mouth
  - coordinates: 0.569828°S 52.576945°W

Basin features
- River system: Jari River

The Iratapuru River (Portuguese: Rio Iratapuru) is a river of Amapá state in Brazil. It is a tributary of the Jari River, which is part of the Amazon River basin.

The Iratapuru River flows from north to south through the 806,184 hectares (1,992,120 acres) Rio Iratapuru Sustainable Development Reserve, created in 1997, where it is fed by many tributaries.

== See also ==
- List of rivers of Amazonas (Brazilian state)
