= Otto Schulz-Kampfhenkel =

- Born: 27 August 1910; Buckow, Märkisch-Oderland, German Empire
- Died: 21 August 1989 (aged 78); Hamburg, West Germany
- Occupation: Geographer

Otto Schulz-Kampfhenkel (27 August 1910 – 21 August 1989) was a German geographer, explorer, writer and film producer.

At the age of 23 Schulz-Kampfhenkel made an expedition to Liberia. He described his experiences in the book Der Dschungel Rief... (The Jungle Called...). After finishing his geography studies he became the leader of the German Amazon-Jary-Expedition (1935-1937), supported by both Brazilian and German governments and the Nazi Party's Foreign Organization (NSDAP/AO). Schulz-Kampfhenkel relates about this expedition in his book Rätsel der Urwaldhölle (Riddle(s) of the jungle hell) and produced an eponymous film, as well.

In 1943 Schulz-Kampfhenkel got promoted to Special Commissioner of geographical questions in the Reichsforschungsrat after he had been lieutenant of Luftwaffe and SS-Untersturmführer.
