= Daniel K. Ludwig =

American businessman (1897–1992)

Daniel Keith Ludwig
- Born: June 24, 1897; South Haven, Michigan, U.S.
- Died: August 27, 1992 (aged 95); New York City, U.S.
- Occupation: Business tycoon
- Known for: Ludwig Institute for Cancer Research, Jari project
- Board member of: Ludwig Institute for Cancer Research, National Bulk Carriers, American-Hawaiian Steamship Company, Exportadora de Sal S.A.
- Spouses: Gladys M. Ludwig (m. 1928–1937) Ginger Higgins (m. 1937)

Daniel Keith Ludwig (June 24, 1897 – August 27, 1992) was an American shipping businessman, who was also involved in many other industries. He pioneered the construction of super tankers in Japan, founded Exportadora de Sal, SA in Mexico and developed it as the largest salt company in the world, built a model community in association with the Jari project, which he pioneered, on the Amazon River in Brazil to produce pulp paper, and had numerous hotels around the world.

Though he was one of the wealthiest tycoons of his day, with operations spanning 23 countries, Ludwig remained completely obscure due to his reclusive lifestyle. He "avoided the press like the plague", keeping a low profile throughout his business career. He only gave one interview during his lifetime, which he granted to Dero A. Saunders of Fortune Magazine in 1957. Ludwig was #1 on the first Forbes 400 list in 1982.

== Childhood ==
Daniel Keith Ludwig was born in 1897 to Daniel Franklin Ludwig (1873–1960) and Florabelle Leslie (1876–1961) in South Haven, Michigan, on the shores of Lake Michigan. His grandfather, John G. Ludwig (1842–1920), was one of seven brothers in a family of 13, most of them born in Pennsylvania. Four of Daniel's granduncles made their living as captains of Great Lakes vessels. His grandfather's brother, Lancaster Columbus Ludwig (1855–1954), served as a captain on a passage steamer from South Haven to Chicago for many decades.

The senior Daniel and his wife Florabelle separated when young Daniel was 15. Daniel Sr. took the youth to Port Arthur, Texas to live with his grandfather John G. Ludwig. Florabelle Ludwig was left alone in South Haven without any means of support. She remarried Daniel Robert Martin in Vancouver, British Columbia in 1915 and resided in the state of Washington the rest of her life. Daniel Sr. moved to Virginia and remarried Isabel Rutherford. Daniel Sr. died in Manatee, Florida in 1960.

Ludwig's first venture into shipping was at the age of nine, when he salvaged a 26-foot (8 m) boat. He left school at the end of eighth grade to work in various shipping-related jobs on Lake Michigan and in Texas, directly learning such trades as machinist, marine engineer, and ship handler. In Port Arthur, he sold supplies to sailing ships and steamers. He returned to Michigan to take a job at a marine engine plant, which sent him to the Pacific Northwest and Alaska.

== Early business ventures ==
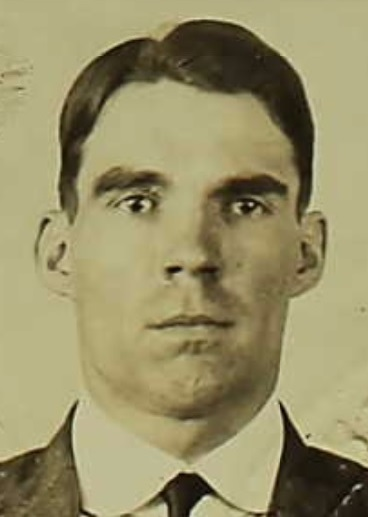
Ludwig's 1920 passport photo

At 19, Ludwig established a freighter business by transporting molasses and lumber around the Great Lakes. There are rumors of his engaging in rum running during the Prohibition era.

In the 1930s, he developed a novel approach to financing further expansion, by borrowing the construction cost of tankers and using pre-agreed charters as collateral. His National Bulk Carriers became one of the largest American shipping companies, and he eventually owned about 60 vessels. In the 1940s, one of his shipyards in Virginia developed a method to use welding instead of riveting, which saved time during World War II, when there was huge demand for new ships. After the war, he had ships built in Japan, where labor costs were lower. His ships transported oil around the world; in the 1950s he pioneered the construction and use of the new oil supertankers.

Ludwig diversified into a wide range of holdings: an oil refinery, banking, cattle ranching, insurance, and real estate. He invested in various mining and exploration projects on nearly every continent: the Americas, Africa, Australia and the Middle East. He created a chain of luxury hotels in Mexico, Bermuda and the Bahamas, and developed Westlake Village, California. At his peak, he owned more than 200 companies in 50 countries, and his fortune was estimated at $4.5 billion.

== Princess International Hotels ==
Ludwig built or bought an impressive collection of hotels. These were: the Hamilton Princess and Southampton Princess in Bermuda; the Bahamas Princess (formerly the King's Inn) and the Xanadu Princess Tower (formerly the International) in Freeport; the Acapulco Princess and the Pierre Marques in Mexico; and the Sir Francis Drake Hotel in San Francisco. The American millionaire recluse Howard Hughes acquired the Xanadu Princess in 1973, and lived there for the last two years of his life.

== Exportadora de Sal, SA ==
In 1954, on a trip to Baja California Sur, Ludwig founded Exportadora de Sal S.A., which became the "Largest Salt Company in the World", at the Guerrero Negro lagoon. As the rural area was largely uninhabited, Ludwig arranged for the necessary workers and materials to be transported there to build a large, new town in the municipality of Mulegé. Here, the saltworks were established by pumping the brine to the surface and allowing it to dry. In 1973, with rumors that the Mexican Government would nationalize the company, Ludwig sold his interest in Exportadora de Sal, SA to Mitsubishi. It owns 49%, with the Mexican government holding the controlling interest.

== Citricos de Chiriqui, SA ==
In a $25 million 1960 project in Panama, Ludwig bought 10,000 acres (4,000 ha) of land in Dolega, in the interior of Panama to develop for citrus cultivation. He had all the land cleared and built roads and bridges. He had 800,000 Valencia orange trees planted, with full production expected by 1967. It was considered the largest privately owned venture of its kind in the world. Years later it was nationalized. The New York Times reported that an auction of Citricos de Chiriqui, SA failed to attract any bidders; the minimum asking price was $13.9 million. It was later purchased by Colombian businessman, Guillermo Cardenas P., and is still functioning to date.

== Jari project ==
In 1966 Ludwig became attracted to ideas of development in the Amazonian Basin. A brutal military dictatorship had toppled the progressive Goulart government in a 1964 coup, with US backing, and US investment was encouraged by the conservative Brazilian generals in power. In 1967, he purchased about 4 million acres (1.6 million ha) of land in Brazil on the north bank of the river in the northeast interior for $3 million. He planned to construct a pulp paper factory, known as the Jari project, as he projected a shortage of fiber on the world market in the coming decades (about which he was right). The site was downriver from American Henry Ford's failed massive project to produce rubber, for which he built a workers' city in the jungle, Fordlandia.

Ludwig planned a massive pulp paper project, and cleared land to plant two varieties of trees to be harvested for paper. He had a 26-mile railroad constructed, as well as 3,000 miles of trails and roads; the settlements had 30,000 inhabitants by early 1982. To feed all the workers, he raised cattle and planted 15,000 acres in rice. In order to develop this, he essentially built a planned community, Monte Dourado. A slum, Beiradao, arose haphazardly across the river from Ludwig's development.

Ultimately his agricultural ventures on that land were not successful. Neither the rice nor one variety of trees took well to the region's soil. But in 1978 he had a plant shipped by sea in two parts from where it was fabricated in Japan: these were "two behemoths 70 meters high, unique in the history of the merchant navy." The plant was assembled and beginning in February 1979, Jari produced 750 tons of cellulose per day. Losses of $1 billion and mounting criticism of his business practices led Ludwig to sell out to Brazilian investors in 1981. He had pushed for more cooperation from the government, and announced failing health as a reason to sell his interests.

Le Monde described Ludwig with his Jari project as ahead of his time. It reported that, in the 21st century, a Brazilian consortium bought the Jari complex. Eucalyptus and Australian pine trees were planted that are better suited to the region. New Finnish machinery and technology has drastically reduced the required labor force and, as Le Monde noted, machines neither strike nor go to the brothels of Beiradao. The government cooperated in approving a hydropower project which Ludwig had sought, and even the slum was improved, as well as renamed to Laranjal do Jari. Ludwig had the right vision about the need for paper, but was ahead of his time and too late in his life to see the project through to its current success.

== Philanthropy ==
Beginning in 1971, Ludwig sold off many of his foreign interests, using the funds to endow the Ludwig Institute for Cancer Research, which he founded in Switzerland. It became his primary interest in his later years. Since his death in 1992, it has distributed over a billion dollars around the world for cancer research.

Under the terms of his will, Ludwig Centers were established in 2006 at six United States research institutions (Johns Hopkins University, Harvard University, the Massachusetts Institute of Technology, Memorial Sloan Kettering Cancer Center, Stanford University and the University of Chicago). To date, they have received US$900 million from the Virginia and Daniel K. Ludwig Fund for Cancer Research.

The Centers and the Ludwig Institute are now collectively known as "Ludwig Cancer Research". By the terms of the grant, their directors and scientists are to work collaboratively with each other and with the Institute. In Canada Rodrigue Choquette, alias Roddy Choquette, was one of his finance advisor.

== Personal life ==
Ludwig married Gladys Madeline Ludwig (1904–1978), in Florida on October 29, 1928. She gave birth to her daughter Patricia Margaret born on October 8, 1936. Estranged from his wife, Ludwig did not acknowledge the girl as his daughter. The couple divorced in April 1937.

Believing Patricia might at some later time try to challenge the terms of his will and claim part of his estate, Daniel Ludwig had blood samples frozen in the 1970s that could be used for genetic testing if ever necessary. Patricia Ludwig did file a lawsuit in the 1990s after his death, but DNA analysis proved Ludwig was not her father, and the case was dismissed. Katherine Jones, Patricia's aunt, claimed that everyone in the family thought that Patricia's father was James Sullivan, a sales rep who died in a car accident in 1939.

Several months after his divorce, Ludwig married Gertrude Virginia "Ginger" Higgins (January 13, 1897 – April 8, 1993), a widow with three children from a previous marriage. They lived in the penthouse at the Park Cinq, a co-op in Manhattan, and remained married until his death there on August 27, 1992.

== See also ==
- American Petroleum Transport Corporation
- List of richest Americans in history

== Bibliography ==
=== English ===
- Shields, Jerry (1986). The Invisible Billionaire, Daniel Ludwig. Boston: Houghton Mifflin. ISBN 0-395-35402-1.
- Dero A. Saunders., "The Wide Oceans of D. K. Ludwig," Fortune, May 1957.
- "Ex-Wife sues Tycoon Ludwig for 10 million", San Francisco Chronicle, 27 January 1978.
- "Twilight of a Tycoon" (Time, November 30, 1978, p. 77), available on-line.
- James R. Arnold, North American Heritage, October 1985 (vol. V11, no. 3).

=== Other languages ===
- (in French) Michel Braudeau, « Daniel Ludwig avait rêvé trop tard », first published in Le Monde, 17 July 2003, collected in Le rêve amazonien, éditions Gallimard, 2004 (ISBN 2-07-077049-4).
