= Michel Braudeau =

French writer (born 1946)

Michel Braudeau (French pronunciation: [miʃɛl bʁodo]; born 1946 in Niort) is a French writer.

He was editor-in-chief of the Nouvelle revue française, from 1999 to 2010.

== Works ==
- L'Amazone, Paris, éditions du Seuil, coll. « Écrire », 1966, 70 p. (ISBN 9782020004275). Epuisé, rééd. Points, 1988 (ISBN 9782020102643)
- Vaulascar, Paris, éditions du Seuil, coll. « Cadre rouge », 1977, 318 p. (ISBN 9782020046961).
- Passage de la Main- d'Or, Paris, éditions du Seuil, 1980, 219 p. (ISBN 978-2-02-005599-4).
- Fantôme d'une puce, Paris, éditions du Seuil, coll. « Cadre rouge », 1982, 248 p. (ISBN 9782020062459).
- Naissance d'une passion, Paris, éditions du Seuil, coll. « Cadre rouge », 1985, 474 p. (ISBN 9782020088923). Prix Médicis 1985.
- L'objet perdu de l'amour, Paris, éditions du Seuil, coll. « Cadre rouge », 1988, 535 p. (ISBN 9782020102810).
- Malaval, Bouchemaine, France, Présence de l'art contemporain, 1989.
- Le Livre de John, Paris, éditions du Seuil, coll. « Cadre rouge », 1992, 307 p. (ISBN 9782020134910).
- Mon ami Pierrot, Paris, éditions du Seuil, coll. « Cadre rouge », 1993, 188 p. (ISBN 9782020207751).
- Esprit de mai, Paris, éditions Gallimard, coll. « Blanche », 1995, 149 p. (ISBN 9782070742530).
- Loin des forêts, Paris, éditions Gallimard, coll. « Blanche », 1997, 335 p. (ISBN 9782070749539).
- La non-personne, Paris, éditions Gallimard, coll. « L'un et l'Autre », 2000, 102 p. (ISBN 9782070757930).
- L'Interprétation des singes, Paris, Éditions Stock, 2001, 680 p. (ISBN 9782234054295).
- Le Monarque et autres sujets, Paris, éditions Gallimard, coll. « Le cabinet des lettrés », 2001, 120 p. (ISBN 9782070762859).
- Six excentriques, Paris, éditions Gallimard, coll. « Blanche », 2003, 95 p. (ISBN 9782070768684).
- Retour à Miranda, Paris, éditions Gallimard, coll. « Blanche », 2003, 369 p. (ISBN 9782070734542).
- Le Rêve amazonien, Paris, éditions Gallimard, coll. « Blanche », 2004, 75 p. (ISBN 9782070770496).
- L'usage des saints, Paris, éditions Gallimard, coll. « Blanche », 2004, 92 p. (ISBN 9782070773169).
- L'étoile de Malaval, Bordeau, France, suivi de Attention à la peinture, William Blake And Co, 2005, 64 p. (ISBN 9782841031504).
- Sarabande, Paris, éditions Gallimard, coll. « Blanche », 2006, 253 p. (ISBN 9782070781546)
- Faussaires éminents, Paris, éditions Gallimard, coll. « Blanche », 2006, 77 p. (ISBN 9782070777174).
- Café : Cafés, Paris, éditions du Seuil, coll. « Fiction & Cie », 2007, 120 p. (ISBN 9782020963954)
- Zoo : Chroniques littéraires 1977-2008, Paris, éditions Gallimard, coll. « Les Cahiers de la NRF » (ISBN 9782070124053).
