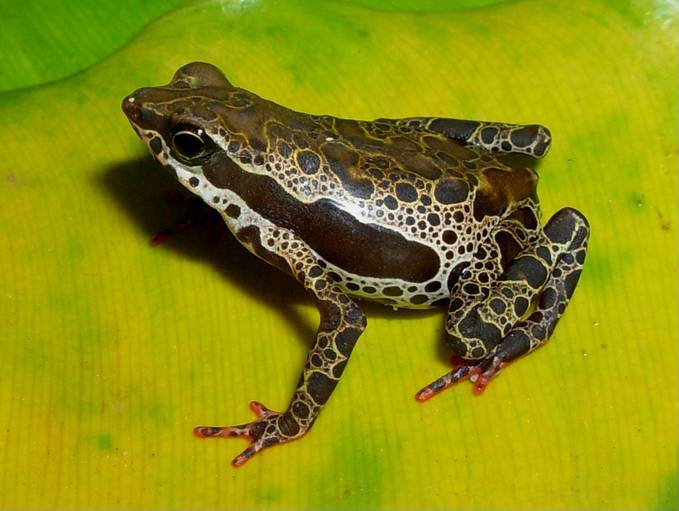

Conservation status
- Vulnerable (IUCN 3.1)

Scientific classification
- Kingdom: Animalia
- Phylum: Chordata
- Class: Amphibia
- Order: Anura
- Family: Bufonidae
- Genus: Atelopus
- Species: A. spumarius

Binomial name
- Atelopus spumarius Cope, 1871

= Atelopus spumarius =

Pebas stubfoot toad

Species of amphibian

Atelopus spumarius (Pebas stubfoot toad) is a species of toad in the family Bufonidae. It is native to Brazil, Colombia, Ecuador, French Guiana, Guyana, Peru and Suriname.

== Description ==
Female Pebas stubfoot toads grow to be between 31 and 39 mm long, while their male counterparts only grow to be 26 to 29 mm long. Their heads are narrow and come to a point at the nose, the skin on their back is smooth with pale green and black stripes and black dots. They do not have a tympanum (eardrum).

== Distribution and habitat ==
The atelopus spumarius is native to South America, and lives in the rainforest near blackwater streams and the Tahuayo River.
