= Jari project =

Tropical tree farm in Brazil

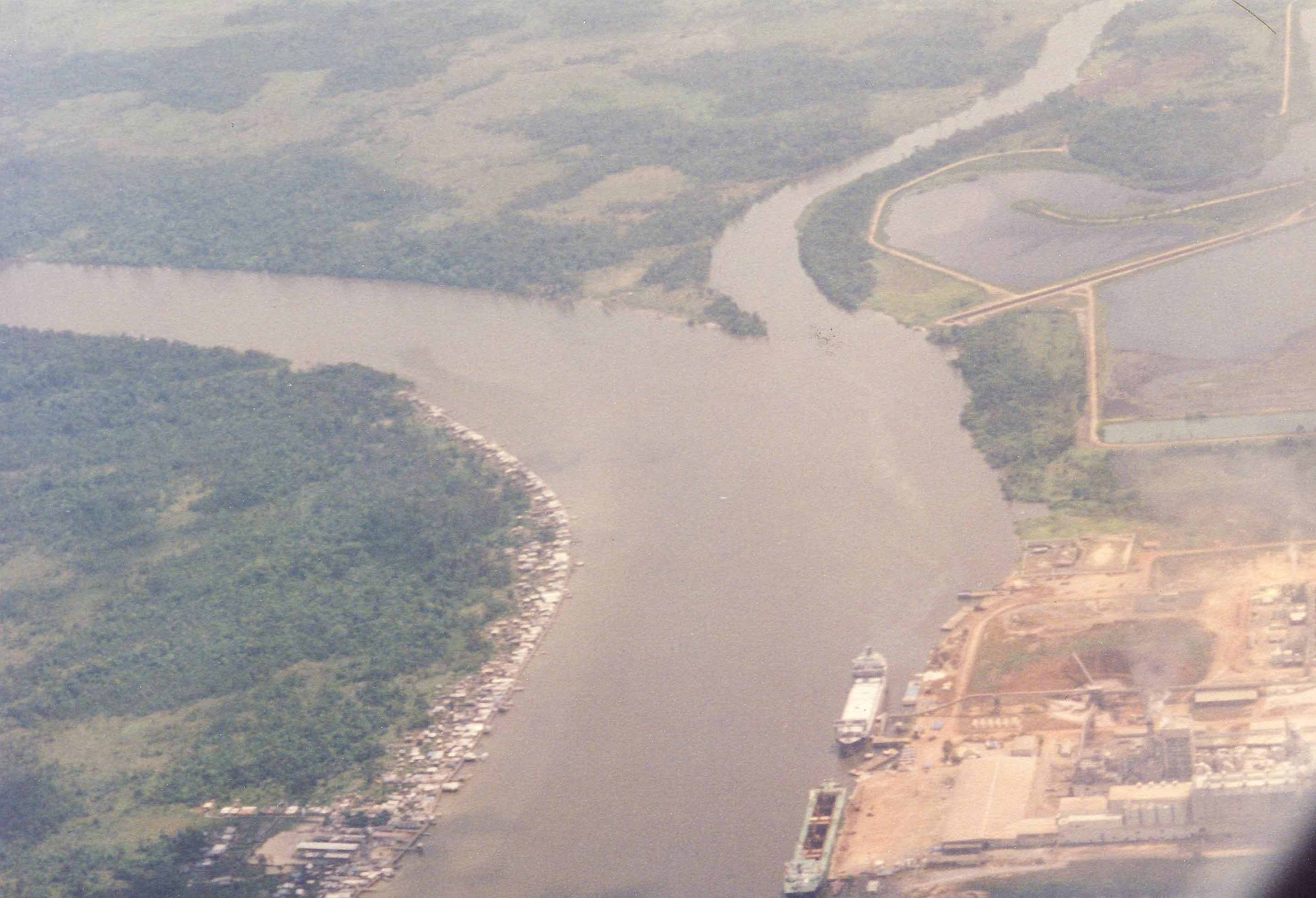
Aerial photo with the construction of Munguba to the right and the shanty town of Beiradinho on the left

The Jari project was an attempt to create a tropical tree farm in Brazil for producing pulp for paper.

== Background ==
The Jari project was a brainchild of US entrepreneur and billionaire Daniel K. Ludwig. In the 1950s he noticed that demand for paper was rising. Since the forests of the temperate zone were already in use, the supply of the wood pulp for paper was fixed. Ludwig foresaw a future increase in the price of paper due to the increase of mass media. Since most of the natural forest timber was not suitable for paper production, Ludwig planned a site where the natural forest would be replaced by a tree farm. It would have to be started decades ahead to supply the future paper production.

== History ==
=== Growth ===
Ludwig selected the fast-growing tropical tree Gmelina arborea for his tree farm. At first he considered locating his tree farm in Costa Rica but the Brazilian military government encouraged him to settle on the lower reaches of the Rio Jari, a tributary of the Amazon River. In 1967, Ludwig bought 1.6 million acres (6,475 km^{2}) for $3 million.

Ludwig controlled the project mainly from the United States. He built a settlement, Monte Dourado, with houses, schools, the only hospital in the area, bakery, supermarket, nurseries, bridges and community buildings. He also built roads and railways. The clearing of the land using heavy bulldozers damaged the topsoil the trees were to be planted in. It became necessary to employ local workers instead for land clearing. Removing the forest cover allowed sunshine to harden the lateritic soil. Gmelina turned out to grow crooked stems, which were very hard to load onto trucks. Also, the new trees were damaged by the numerous insects living in the area of the Amazon. Pinus radiata was planted on the sandier river-bottom soils.

Other settlements, the "free cities" of Beiradão and Beiradinho, grew up across the river to provide services not contemplated by the American planners. In its heyday, the Jari Project had 35,000 workers.

Ludwig had also commissioned two large ship-shaped platforms that were built in Japan and floated to the Jari Project. One barge module contained the pulping sector of the pulp mill. This module housed the digesting, the brown stock, the bleach plant, and the pulp machine. The second module housed the recovery boiler, the evaporators and the recaust. The pulp mill barge was finished in 1978 and launched on 1 February. It traveled through the Indian Ocean and around the Cape of Good Hope, arriving at the Brazilian city of Munguba on 28 April. The power group module arrived four days later. Both barges were floated into specially built locks. Hundreds of gum wood piles had been driven into the ground to support the two barges. By closing the locks and pumping the water out, the barges gently settled on the many piles.

It was found that the growth rate of the Gmelina wood was much lower than that predicted and anticipated. To satisfy the demand of the pulp mill production it became necessary to purchase other species of wood from other Brazilian sources. Beginning in 1981 the foresters planted Eucalyptus as they harvested the Gmelina. Eucalyptus tested well for pulping, grew quite well and reduced the demand on purchased wood from other sources.

=== Diversification ===
Another of Ludwig's ideas was to grow all the food needed, including rice to feed the workers, which did not turn out well either. Rice growing required large amount of pesticides to keep insects at bay and the soil did not have enough sulfur for rice. Ludwig corrected the situation with the application of ammonium sulfate. He included cattle farming to feed on the grass that grew among the pine trees. He also discovered a very large source of kaolin. The mining of kaolin on the Jari river is still a large-scale commercial operation. Kaolin is exported to numerous countries in Asia and Europe for coating fine paper.

=== Decline ===
Problems also began to increase because of the so-called Amazon Factor - the combined effects of soil, insects, humidity and tropical disease. It was very hard to keep engineers for the pulp mill, as there was little entertainment for their wives. Newly planted trees required manual weeding for a few years, which meant importing many field laborers from the poverty-stricken Northwest of Brazil. Workers contracted malaria. Insects devoured the harvest and supplies.

Then Brazilian government officials began to criticize Ludwig's methods and the extent of his land ownership. They also questioned the project's exemption from taxes, not to mention his methods - he had fired twenty-nine directors during the thirteen years of the project and preferred to decide everything essential by himself.

Ludwig gave up in May 1981. The next year he turned the Jari project over to a consortium of Brazilian businessmen. He did not receive any money but the several hundreds of millions of dollars of debt were transferred to new owners. Ludwig was to receive a gradually diminishing cut of the possible profits until the year 2026. The new owners demanded - as Ludwig had - investment in the local infrastructure.

The remains of the project remain in Brazilian hands in the form of the Jarcel Cellulose company. Ownership is in the hands of Brazilian banks and holding companies.

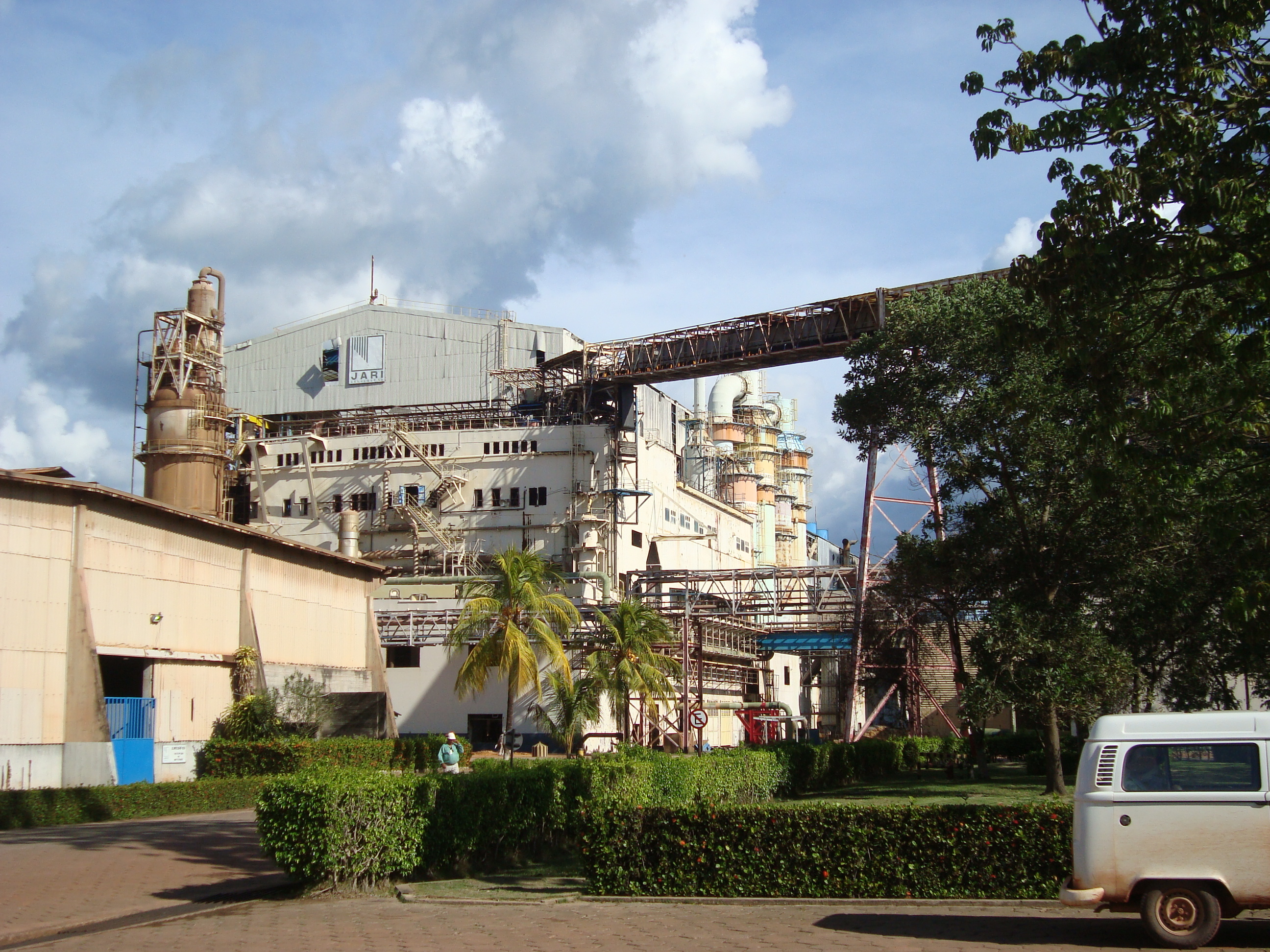
Factory (front)

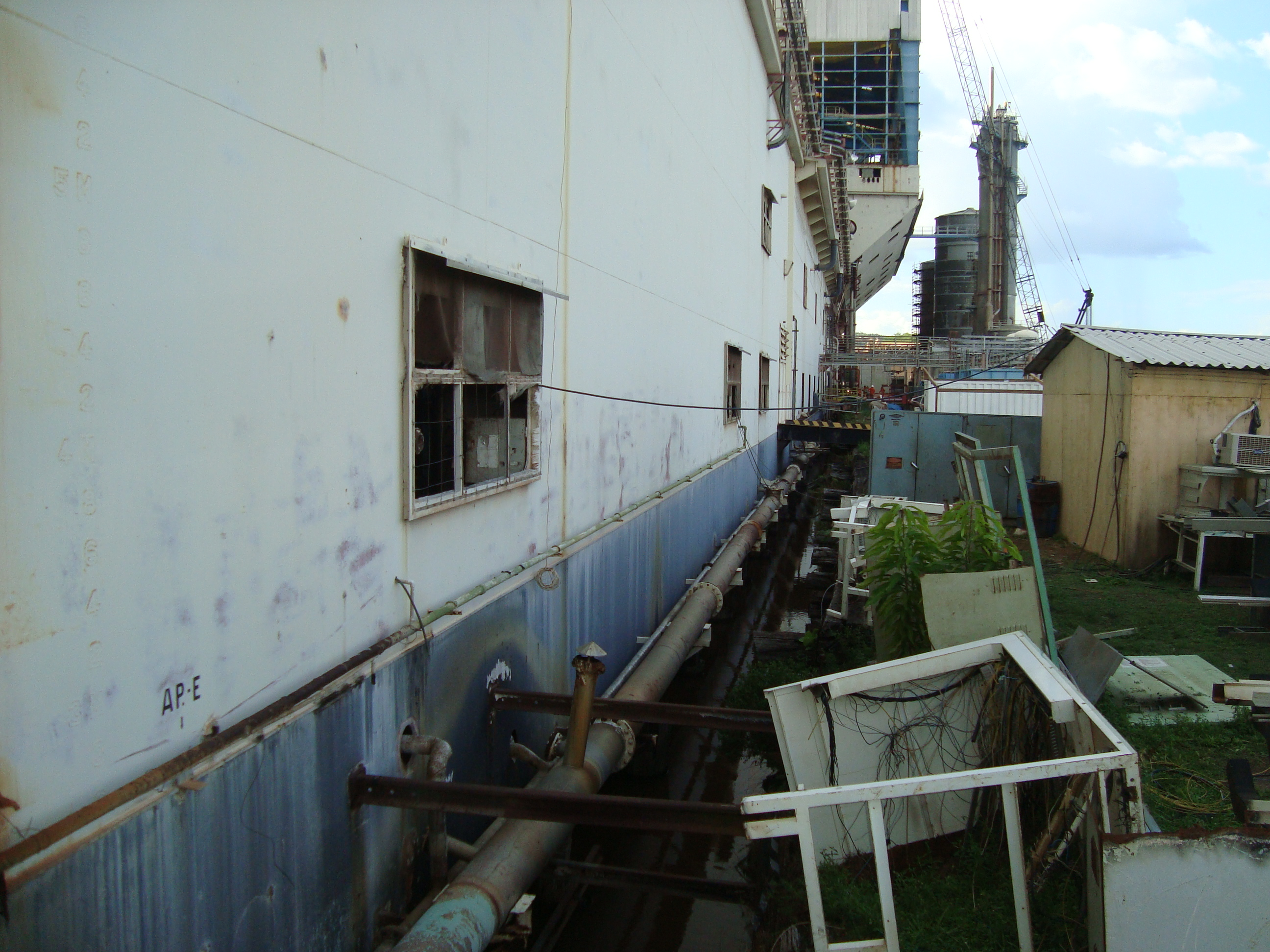
Floating factory

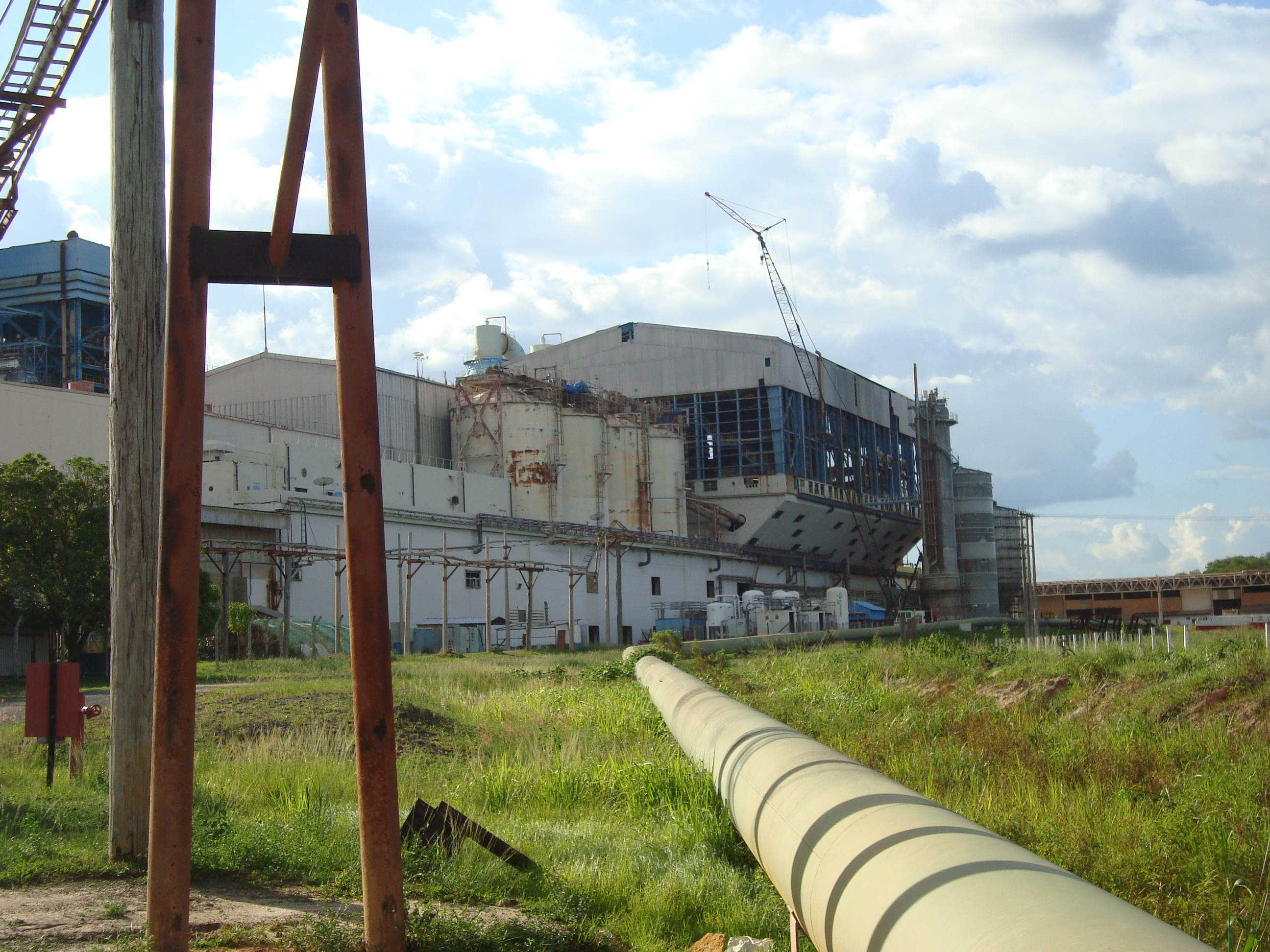
Factory (rear)

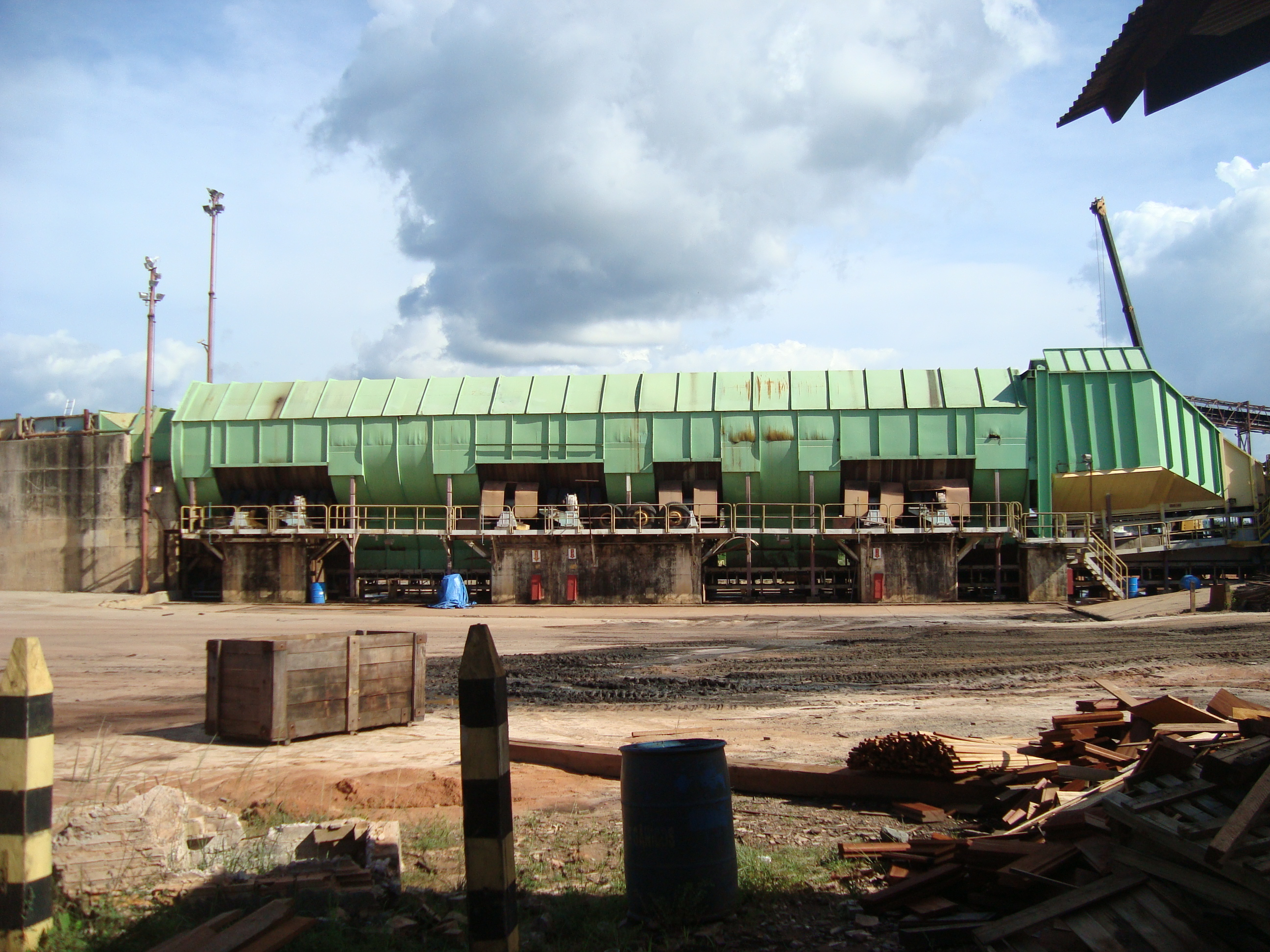
Installations

== See also ==
- Tanganyika groundnut scheme
- Bãi Bằng

== Bibliography ==
- McIntyre, Loren (May 1980). "Jari: A Billion Dollar Gamble". National Geographic. Vol. 157, no. 5. pp. 686–711. ISSN 0027-9358. OCLC 643483454.
- (in French) Michel Braudeau, « Daniel Ludwig avait rêvé trop tard », in Le rêve amazonien, éditions Gallimard, 2004 (ISBN 2-07-077049-4).
