= Monte Dourado =

Town and district in Pará, Brazil

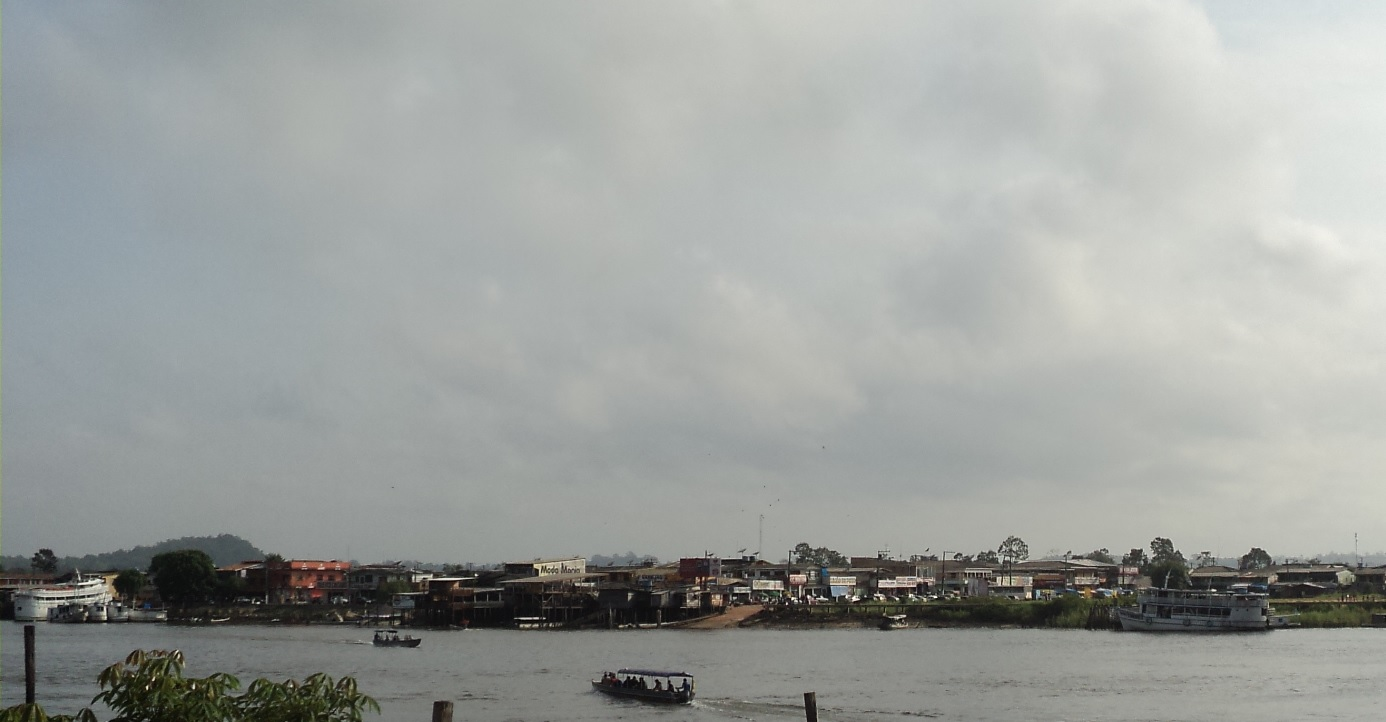
- Monte Dourado as seen from Laranjal do Jari

- Location in Brazil Monte Dourado (Brazil)
- Coordinates: 0.8642°S 52.5404°W
- Country: Brazil
- Region: North
- State: Pará
- Municipality: Almeirim

Population (2010)
  - Total: 10,590
- Time zone: UTC-3

Monte Dourado is a town and district in the Brazilian municipality of Almeirim, in the state of Pará. Monte Dourando is a planned town established in 1967 to house the workers for the Jari project. The city is located on the Jari River.

== History ==
In 1964, Daniel K. Ludwig, an American billionaire, purchased 4,000,000 acres (1,600,000 ha) of rainforest in Brazil. In 1967, he conceived the Jari project. The plan was to replace the rainforest with Gmelina arborea for the pulp industry.

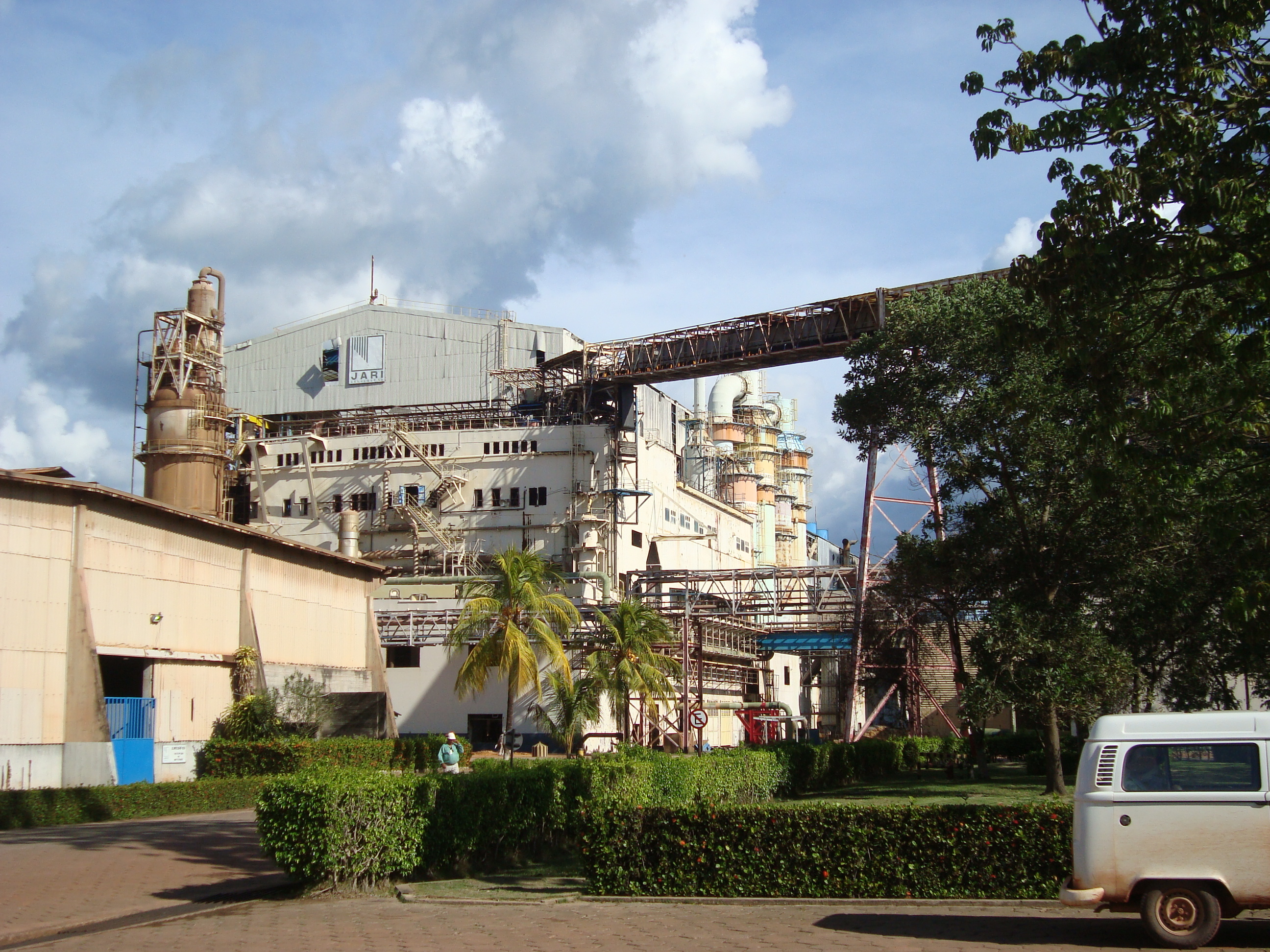
Cellulose factory in Munguba

A planned city called Monte Dourado (English: Golden Mountain) was built in Almeirim to house the workers. Ludwig started building schools, hospitals, roads, and ports. He wanted the Brazilian government to finance the construction of the city, but they refused. The city was unable to provide housing for all the workers, and a shanty town called Beiradão (nowadays: Laranjal do Jari) emerged on the other side of the Jari River.

The project turned into a major money-losing failure, and in 1982, the land was sold. In 1983, Monte Dourado became a district of Almeirim.

== Transport ==
Monte Dourado is linked to Almeirim via the PA-473 road. The city of Laranjal do Jari can be reached by ferry. Monte Dourado can be reached by air via the Monte Dourado Airport.

== Munguba ==
Munguba is the port and industrial centre for the Jari project. It is located 17 kilometres from Monte Dourado, and contains the power plant and pulp mill. Munguba is connected to Monte Dourado and the industrial sites by 75 kilometres of rail road track. Munguba is located on the Jari River.
