= List of rivers of Amapá =

List of rivers in Amapá (Brazilian State).

The list is arranged by drainage basin from north to south, with respective tributaries indented under each larger stream's name and ordered from downstream to upstream. All rivers in Amapá drain to the Atlantic Ocean.

== By Drainage Basin ==
- Oiapoque River
  - Uaçá River
    - Caripi River
    - Urucaua River
  - Cricou River
  - Anotaié River
  - Marupi River
  - Iaué River
  - Mutura River
  - Tangararé River
  - Kariniutu River
- Cassiporé River
  - Arapari River
- Cunani River
- Calçoene River
- Amapá Grande River
  - Flechal River
- Macari River
  - Tartarugalzinho River
  - Tartarugal Grande River
- Araguari River
  - Aporema River
  - Amapari River
    - Cupixi River
    - Tacunapi River
  - Falsino River
  - Santo António River
  - Mutum River
  - Mururé River
  - Tajauí River
- Amazon River (Canal do Norte)
  - Guarijuba River
  - Jupati River
  - Macacoari River
  - Pedreira River
  - Matapi River
    - Maruanum River
  - Vila Nova River
    - Camaipi River do Vila Nova River
    - Piaçaca River
  - Preto River
  - Maracá-Pucu River
    - Camaipi River do Maracá River
  - Maracá River
  - Cajari River
    - São Luis River
  - Jari River
    - Iratapuru River
    - Iratapina River
    - Noucouru River
    - Mapiri River
      - Inipaco River
    - Cuc River
    - Culari River
    - Curapi River
    - Ximim-Ximim River
    - Mapaoni River

== Alphabetically ==
- Amapá Grande River
- Amapari River
- Amazon River (Canal do Norte)
- Anotaié River
- Aporema River
- Araguari River
- Arapari River
- Cajari River
- Calçoene River
- Camaipi River do Maracá River
- Camaipi River do Vila Nova River
- Caripi River
- Cassiporé River
- Cricou River
- Cuc River
- Culari River
- Cunani River
- Cupixi River
- Curapi River
- Falsino River
- Flechal River
- Guarijuba River
- Iaué River
- Inipaco River
- Iratapina River
- Iratapuru River
- Jari River
- Jupati River
- Kariniutu River
- Macacoari River
- Macari River
- Mapaoni River
- Mapiri River
- Maracá River
- Maracá-Pucu River
- Maruanum River
- Marupi River
- Matapi River
- Mururé River
- Mutum River
- Mutura River
- Noucouru River
- Oiapoque River
- Pedreira River
- Piaçaca River
- Preto River
- Santo António River
- São Luis River
- Tacunapi River
- Tajauí River
- Tangararé River
- Tartarugal Grande River
- Tartarugalzinho River
- Uaçá River
- Urucaua River
- Vila Nova River
- Ximim-Ximim River
