= Arapari River =

There are several rivers named Arapari River.

== Brazil ==
- Arapari River (Amapá)
- Arapari River (Roraima), a river of Roraima

== See also ==
- Amapari River, a river of Amapá, Brazil
