= Oiapoque =

Municipality in Amapá, Brazil

- Municipality
- Município de Oiapoque
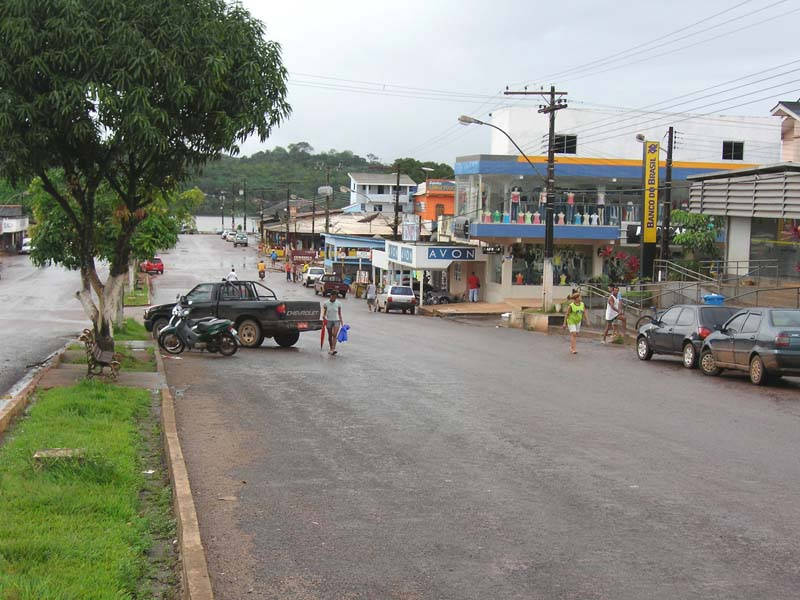
- A street in Oiapoque

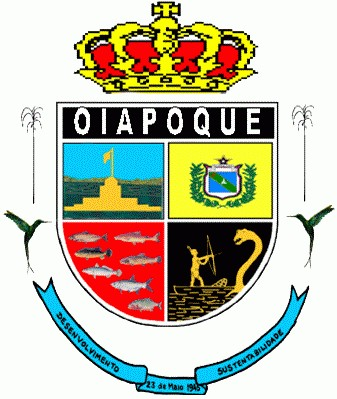
- Flag Coat of arms

- Location of Oiapoque in the State of Amapá

- Coordinates: 03°50′34″N 51°50′06″W
- Country: Brazil
- Region: North
- State: Amapá
- Founded: 1945

Government
  - Mayor: Breno Lima de Almeida (PRTB)

Area
  - Total: 22,625 km^{2} (8,736 sq mi)
- Elevation: 3.0 m (10 ft)

Population (2020)
  - Total: 27,906
  - Density: 1.2334/km^{2} (3.1945/sq mi)
- Time zone: UTC−3 (BRT)
- HDI (2000): 0.738 – medium
- Website: oiapoque.com.br

Oiapoque (Brazilian Portuguese pronunciation: [ojaˈpɔki]) is a municipality in the north of the state of Amapá, Brazil. Its population is 27,906 and its area is 22,625 square kilometres (8,736 mi^{2}). Oiapoque is also a major river in the same state, forming the international border with French Guiana. The Oyapock River Bridge, connecting the village with Saint-Georges in French Guiana, was completed in 2011 but not opened to pedestrian or vehicle traffic until 2017.

Lying on the northern coast of Brazil, Oiapoque is popularly considered the northernmost point of Brazil. The phrase do Oiapoque ao Chuí ("from Oiapoque to Chuí") means "all of Brazil." However, there are more northerly points in Roraima state such as the municipality of Uiramutã. Oiapoque remains the northernmost coastal city of Brazil, and the northernmost city of Amapá. It occupies more than half of the north border of the state.

== Early history ==
The Oiapoque River was visited by Europeans in the first years of the 16th century. The first European was the pirate Vicente Yáñez Pinzón. It has been called Japoc, Yapoc, Iapoco, and even Vicente Pinzón River. The name Oiapoque was officially used from 1900, when a territorial dispute between Brazil and France was resolved through Swiss diplomatic arbitration.

== Clevelândia ==
At the beginning of the 20th century, the village of Oiapoque hosted a political and criminal concentration camp called Clevelândia. In 1922 an agricultural outpost called the Núcleo Colonial Cleveland was transformed into a camp during the presidency of Artur Bernardes (1922–1926). Many Brazilian anarchist militants were sentenced to hard labour here. Of the 946 prisoners interned at Clevelândia between 1924 and 1927, 491 died. Many of the survivors returned to São Paulo and Rio de Janeiro permanently sickened with malaria.

== Geography ==
Oiapoque is bordered to the west by its long frontier with French Guiana. It is bordered to the north by the Atlantic Ocean. On its eastern and southern sides it borders the municipalities of Calçoene, Serra do Navio, Pedra Branca do Amapari, and Laranjal do Jari.

The municipality contains 24.15% of the 2,369,400-hectare (5,855,000-acre) Amapá State Forest, a sustainable use conservation unit established in 2006. The Cape Orange National Park is located on the coast of the municipality, and covers 6,573 square kilometres (2,538 sq mi) of rainforest on the coast line.

Oiapoque can be accessed by air via the Oiapoque Airport.

=== Climate ===
Oiapoque has a tropical monsoon climate (Am) with moderate to little rainfall from August to November and heavy to very heavy rainfall in the remaining months.

Climate data for Oiapoque
Month	Jan	Feb	Mar	Apr	May	Jun	Jul	Aug	Sep	Oct	Nov	Dec	Year
Mean daily maximum °C (°F)	29.2 (84.6)	28.6 (83.5)	29.8 (85.6)	29.3 (84.7)	29.5 (85.1)	30.0 (86.0)	31.0 (87.8)	31.9 (89.4)	32.6 (90.7)	33.0 (91.4)	32.3 (90.1)	30.3 (86.5)	30.6 (87.1)
Daily mean °C (°F)	25.4 (77.7)	25.0 (77.0)	25.7 (78.3)	25.6 (78.1)	25.8 (78.4)	25.8 (78.4)	26.0 (78.8)	26.4 (79.5)	26.5 (79.7)	26.5 (79.7)	26.3 (79.3)	25.7 (78.3)	25.9 (78.6)
Mean daily minimum °C (°F)	21.6 (70.9)	21.5 (70.7)	21.6 (70.9)	22.0 (71.6)	22.1 (71.8)	21.6 (70.9)	21.0 (69.8)	20.9 (69.6)	20.5 (68.9)	20.0 (68.0)	20.4 (68.7)	21.2 (70.2)	21.2 (70.2)
Average rainfall mm (inches)	395 (15.6)	345 (13.6)	396 (15.6)	450 (17.7)	537 (21.1)	370 (14.6)	193 (7.6)	102 (4.0)	48 (1.9)	44 (1.7)	116 (4.6)	313 (12.3)	3,309 (130.3)
Source: Climate-Data.org

== Kuahí Museum ==
The Kuahí Museum was opened in 2007 by the four indigenous groups living the municipality: the Palikur, the Galibi Marworno, the Galibi do Oiapoque, and the Karipuna do Amapá. The museum contains more than 400 objects used by the Amerindians. The project was conceived in the 1990s to promote and transmit the knowledge of the indigenous community. The museum is a public not-for-profit entity linked to the Amapá State Secretariat of Culture.

== Subdivisions ==
The municipality of Oiapoque contains three districts:

Name / Main settlement	Other settlements
The town of Oiapoque	
Clevelândia do Norte	Ilha Bela, Vila Brasil
Vila Velha	

There are four indigenous tribes in the municipality located in indigenous territories:

Tribe	Main settlement	Other settlements
Galibi Marworno	Kumarumã	
Galibi do Oiapoque	São José dos Galibi	
Karipuna do Amapá	Manga	Espírito Santo, Santa Isabel
Palikur	Kumenê	Flecha, Kamuywa

== Gallery ==
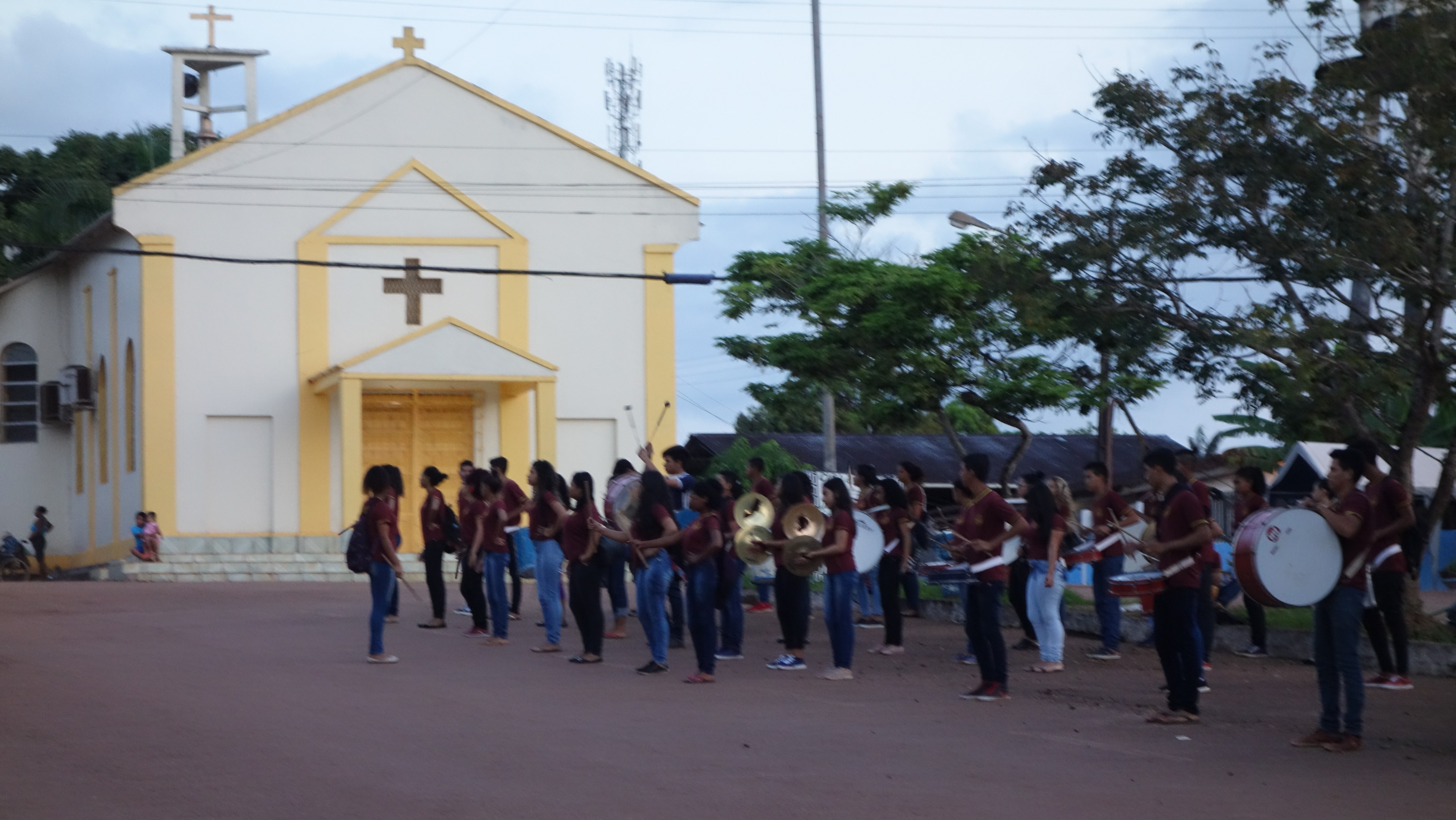

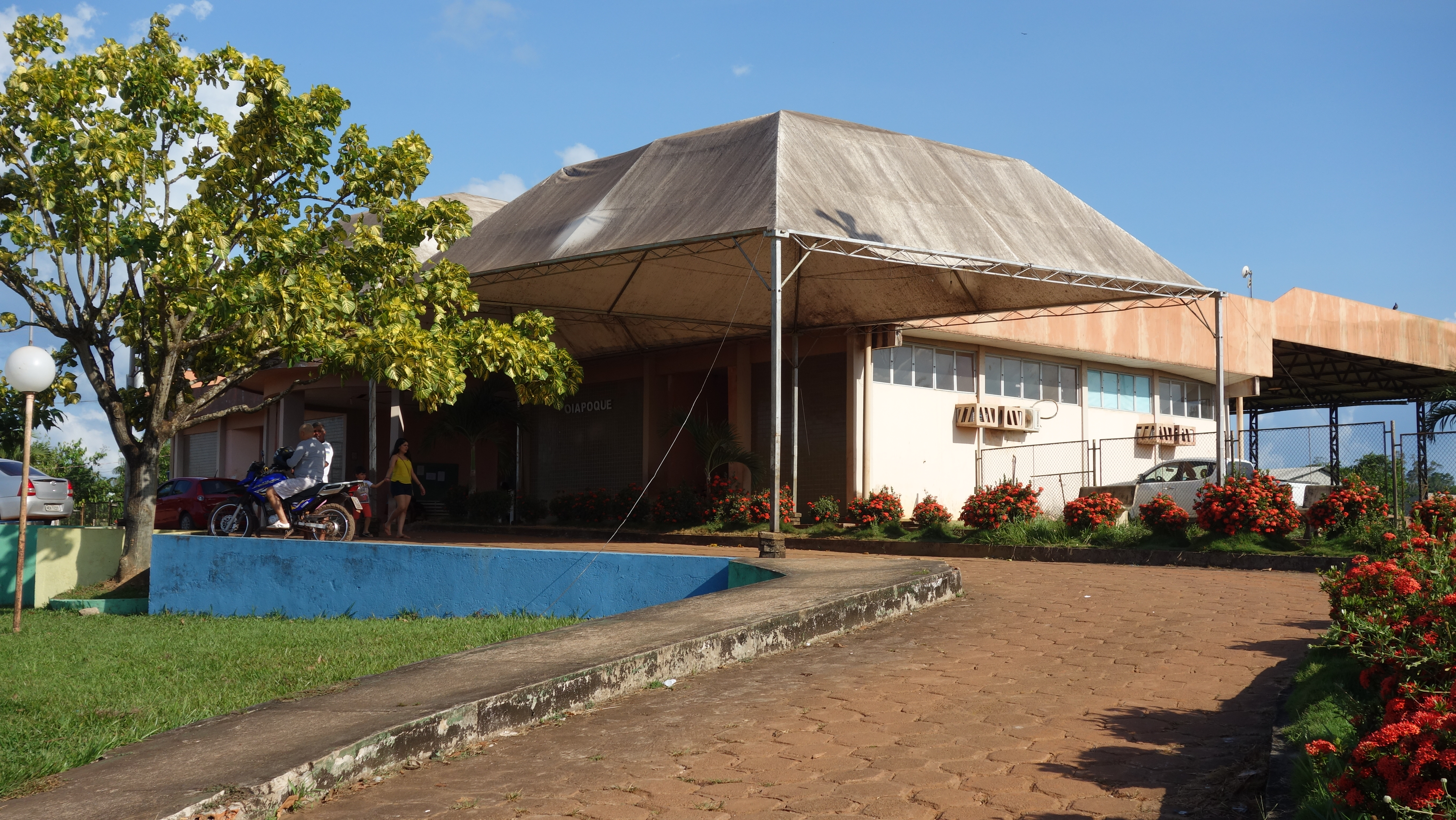

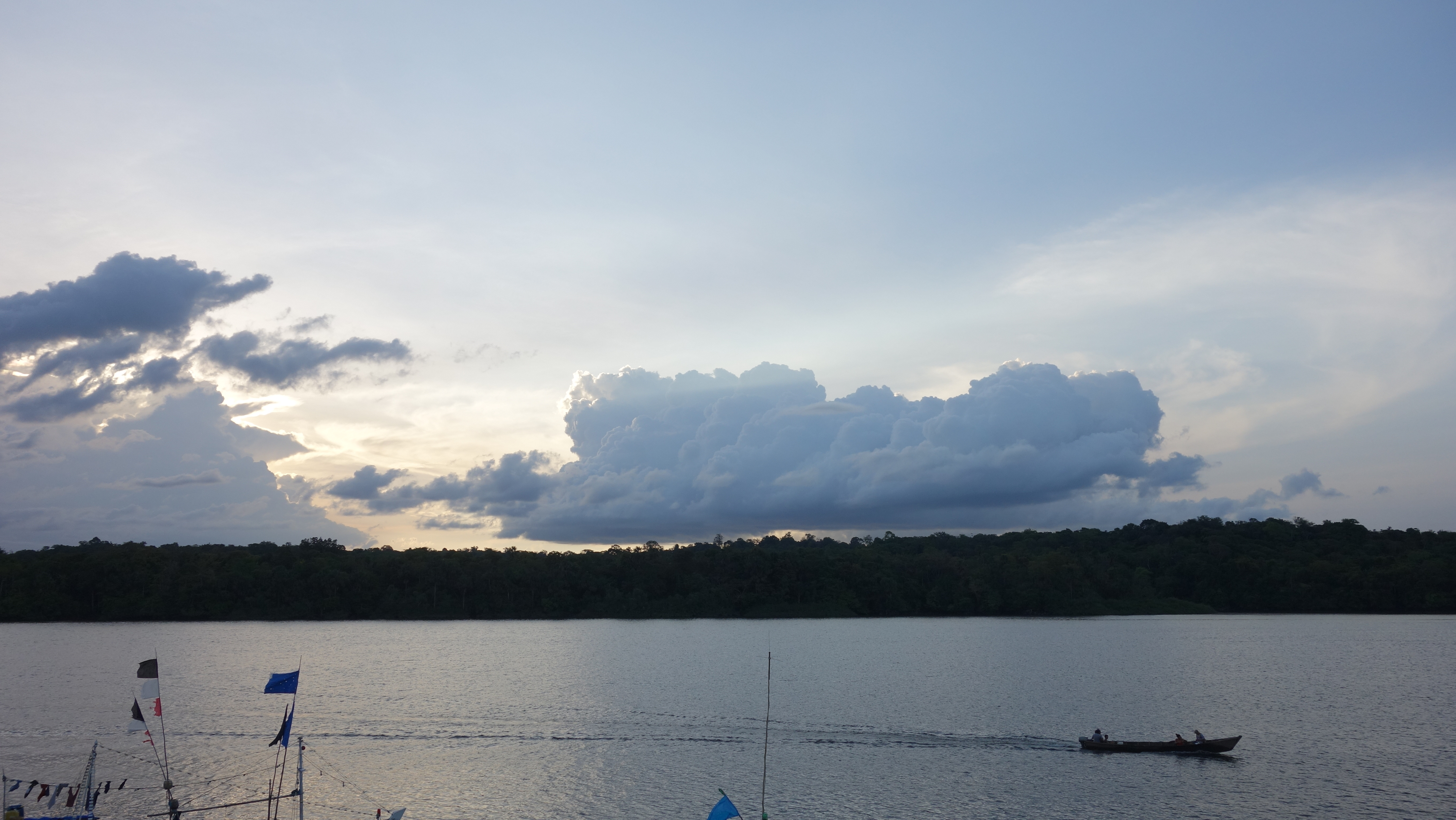

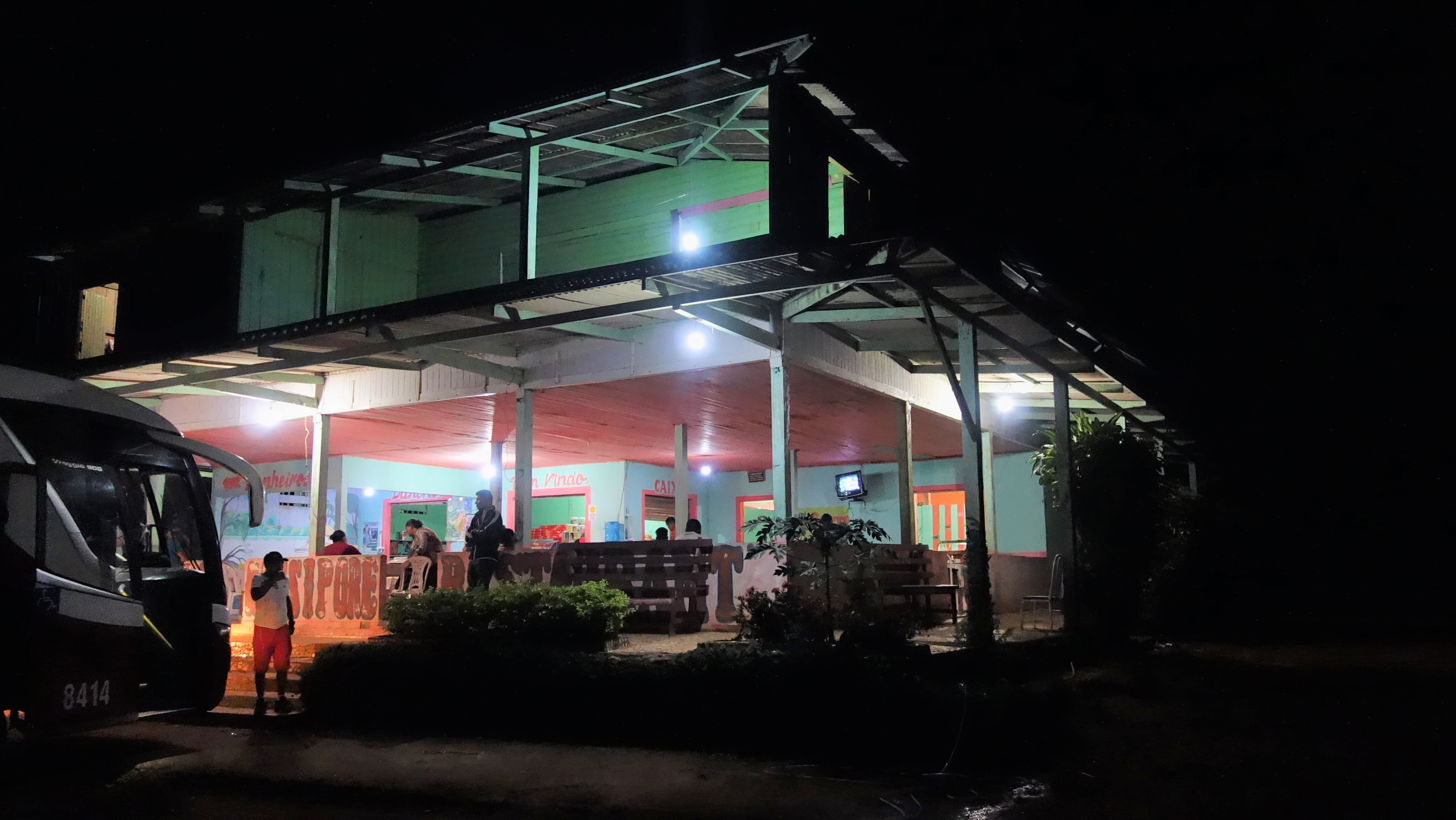
