= Cajari River =

Cajari River may refer to:

- Cajari River (Amapá), a river in the Brazilian state Amapá
- Cajari River (Marajó), a river on the island Marajó in the Brazilian state Pará
