= Kumenê =

Kumenê Ukumene
- Location in Brazil Kumenê (Brazil)
- Coordinates: 3.4881°N 51.4846°W
- Country: Brazil
- Region: North
- State: Amapá
- Municipality: Oiapoque

Population (2016)
  - Total: 1,056
- Time zone: UTC-3

Kumenê (also Ukumene) is a Palikur Amerindian village in the Brazilian municipality of Oiapoque, Amapá. It is the largest village of the tribe. Kumenê is located on the Urucaua River in the Uaçá Indigenous Territory.

== Overview ==
The area around the Urucaua River is the ancestral territory of the Palikur. In 1965, two linguists of the Summer Institute of Linguistics arrived in Kumenê to learn the language. They stayed for about 11 years, and founded the first school.

[n the 1980s, pastors from the Assembly of God of Macapá arrived and started to convert the population. They built a church and banned shamanism, traditional dances, nudism, and caxixi, a local alcoholic beverage. Nowadays, the village is Pentecostal.

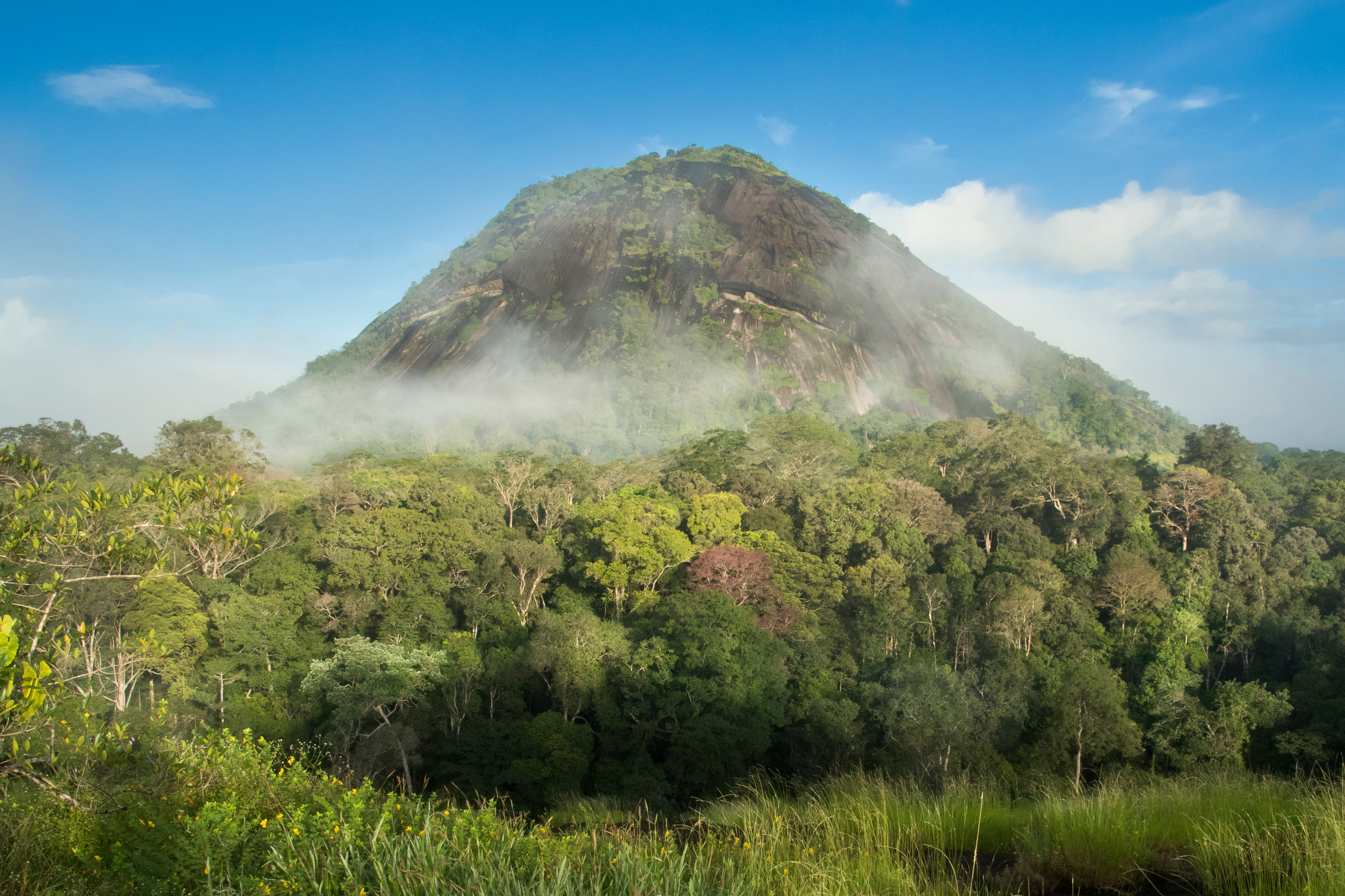
Monte Carupina

The village contains the health centre for the region. The houses in the village are built on stilts. In 2017, there was a malaria outbreak in the region.

Kumenê can only be reached by boat, and is located about seven hours from Oiapoque. Monte Carupina, a 325 metres (1,066 ft) high mountain, is located near the village.
