= Oiapoque Airport =

Airport in Oiapoque, Brazil

Oiapoque Airport Aeroporto de Oiapoque
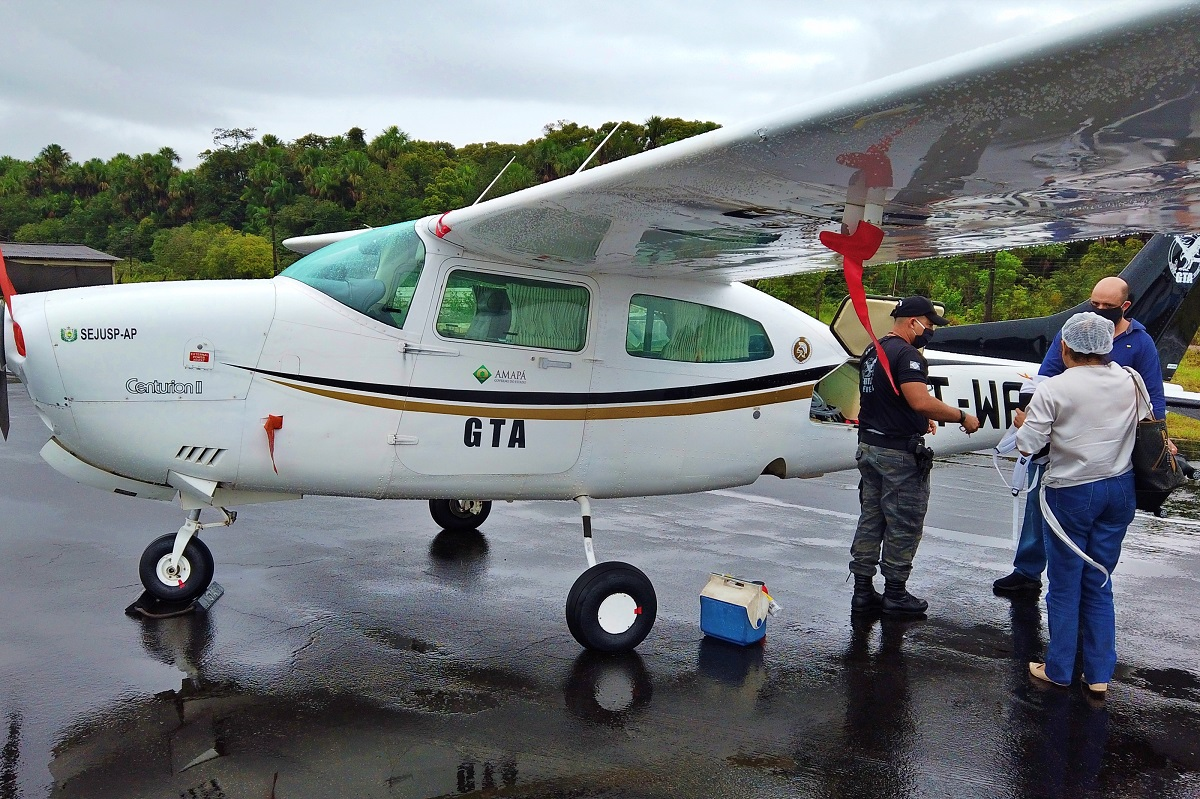
- Arrival of a medical flight during the COVID-19 pandemic (2020)
- IATA: OYK; ICAO: SBOI; LID: AP0002

Summary
- Airport type: Public
- Serves: Oiapoque
- Time zone: BRT (UTC−03:00)
- Elevation AMSL: 16 m (52 ft)
- Coordinates: 03°51′41″N 051°47′46″W

Map
- Location in Brazil OYK (Brazil)

Runways
Direction	Length		Surface
Direction	m	ft	Surface
03/21	1,500	4,921	Asphalt
- Sources: ANAC, DECEA

Oiapoque Airport (IATA: OYK, ICAO: SBOI) is the airport serving Oiapoque, Brazil.

== History ==
Oiapoque Airport, located by the French Guiana border, does not allow for instrument approach. The nearest airport with instrument approach is Cayenne – Félix Eboué Airport at a distance of 66.5 kilometres.

== Airlines and destinations ==
Airlines	Destinations
Azul Brazilian Airlines	Charter: Macapá

== Access ==
The airport is located 5 km (3 mi) from downtown Oiapoque.

== Accidents ==
- 4 June 2002: a Marco Zero Táxi Aéreo EMB-721 Sertanejo registration PT-EPH flying from Oiapoque to Macapá International Airport crashed near the Cassiporé River killing all five occupants. The accident was probably caused by poor weather.

== See also ==
- List of airports in Brazil
