= Karipuna do Amapá =

Ethnic group

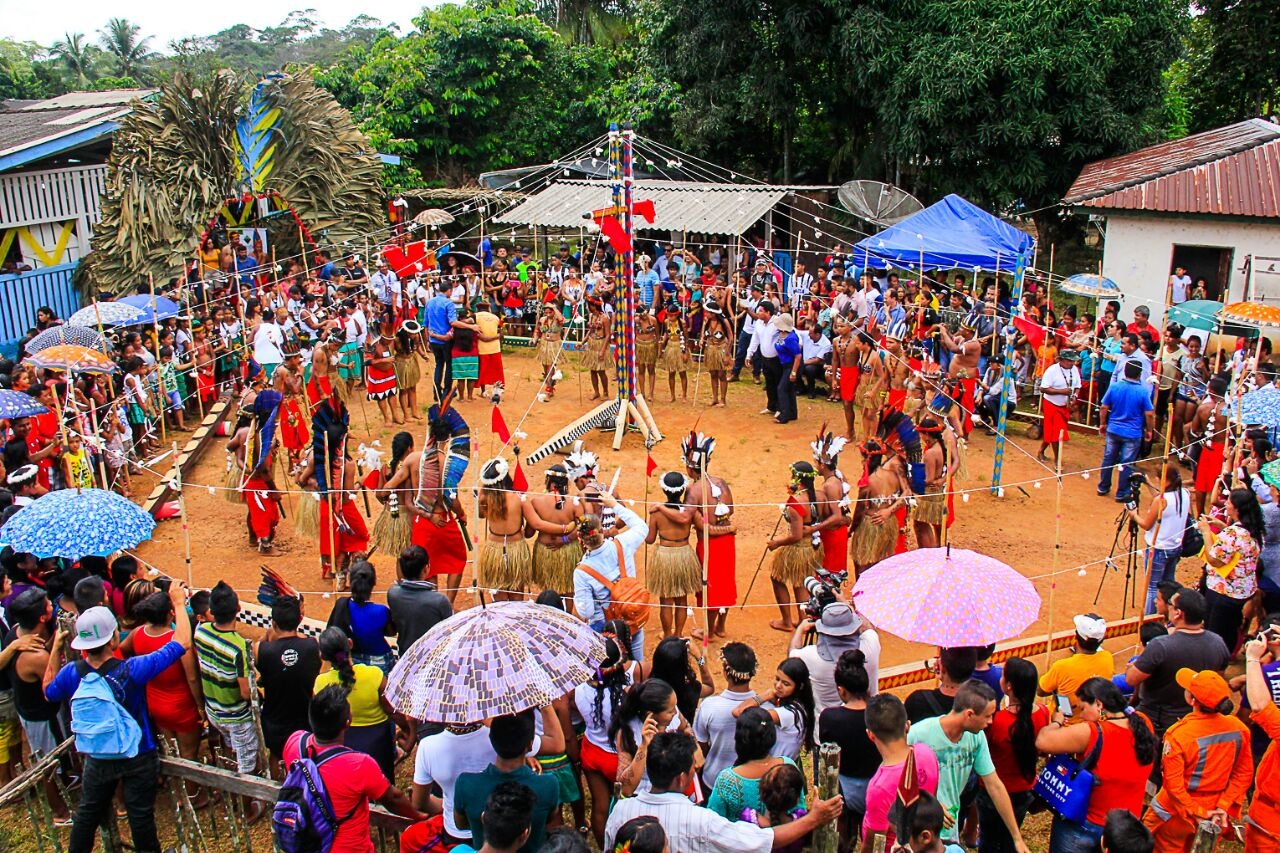
- Indian Day in Manga (2017)

Total population
- ca. 2,922 (2014)

Regions with significant populations
- Brazil (Amapá)

Languages
- Karipúna French Creole, Portuguese

Religion
- Animism (traditionally)

The Karipuna do Amapá (also: Karipúna) are an Indigenous people located in the riverine areas of the Brazilian state of Amapá, particularly around the Caripi River. In 2014, the population was estimated at 2,922 people.

== History ==
The Amerindians use the term Karipuna, because they are mixed or civilized Amerindians. The tribe is the result of several migrations, and mixing with non-Indigenous people. The main groups being Amerindian, French Guianese, Saint Lucian Arabs, and Chinese. In 1830, the Cabanagem Revolt resulted in the migration from the mouth of the Amazon River to the region. The Karipuna had long been in contact with French Guianese which intensified during the gold rush of 1854 in Approuague. They used to speak the now extinct Karipúna do Uaçá language, but by 1900, Karipúna French Creole had taken over.

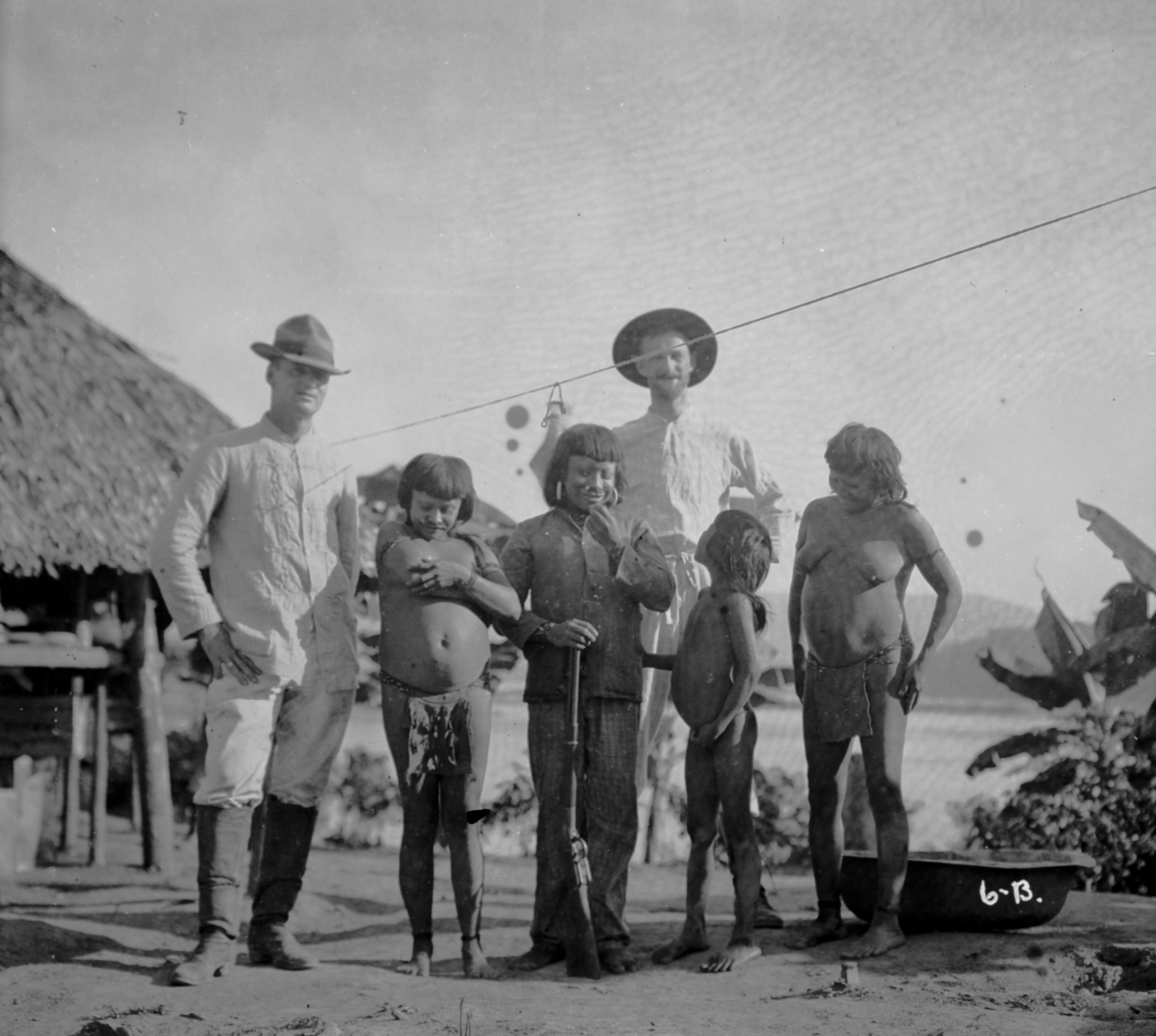
Karipuna in 1910

The borders between French Guiana and Brazil were not clear, and therefore, the area between the Amazon and the Oiapoque was considered a neutral territory. In 1886, the unrecognised Republic of Independent Guiana was proclaimed in the disputed area. In 1897, France and Brazil asked Switzerland to settle the border dispute. In 1900, the Swiss awarded most of the territory to Brazil.

At the start of the 20th century, there were about 150 Karipuna. In the 1920, the Brazilian government started to exert control over the "frenchified" Amerindians in the Oiapoque region, and embarked on a colonization program which failed in 1925. In 1934, a teacher was sent to the Caripi River to establish a school. In the 1970s, the Amerindians in the Oiapoque banded together, and formed a political action groups. This resulted in the demarcation by FUNAI of a common area of 5,181 km^{2} for the Palikur, the Uaçá Galibi, and the Karipuna do Amapá. In 1992, Apoio was established as a political association for all tribes in the region.

== Settlements ==
Location of the Karipuna settlements on the map of Amapá, Brazil. Santa Isabel is next to Espírito Santo. Shared settlements are marked in green.

The Karipuna are spread over 16 settlements. Most of the settlements are along the Caripi River. Some villages like Piquiá and Curipi have been established along the BR-156 highway. The largest settlements are Manga (1,075), Espírito Santo (657) and Santa Isabel (382). The villages of Kunanã and Uahá are shared with the Galibi Marworno. There is an unpaved road from Manga to the BR-156.

Karipuna have started to migrate to Oiapoque. The opening of the Oyapock River Bridge has accelerated the migration to the urban area around Cayenne, and led to the founding of Résidence Arc-en-ciel.

== Language ==
The main languages spoken by the Karipuna are Karipúna French Creole and Portuguese. French Creole is also used as a common language with the Palikur and the Uaçá Galibi. The language originally spoken by the Karipuna was Palikúr.

== Economy ==
The economy is mainly based on fishing and subsistence farming.

== Bibliography ==
- Anonby, Stan (2007). "A report on the creoles of Amapá". Journal of Language Survey Reports.
- Ferreira, Jo-Anne; Alleyne, Mervyn C (2015). Synchronic and Diachronic Perspectives on Contact Languages. John Benjamins. doi:10.1075/cll.32.19fer.
