= Cachaço, Brazil =

Cachaço
- Location in Brazil Cachaço (Brazil)
- Coordinates: 0.8759°N 52.0180°W
- Country: Brazil
- Region: North
- State: Amapá
- Municipality: Serra do Navio

Population (2010)
  - Total: 922
- Time zone: UTC−3 (BRT)

Cachaço is a district in the Brazilian municipality of Serra do Navio in the state of Amapá. It is located along the Amapari River.

== Overview ==
Cachaço was founded by gold miners during the late 19th century gold rush. The village is named after cachaça, a distilled spirit made from sugarcane. Cachaço became a district of Serra do Navio in 2001. In the 21st century, the discovery of gold in the neighbouring town of Pedra Branca do Amapari has resulted in the return of garimpeiros (illegal gold prospectors) to Cachaço.

Cachaço has a school, a health care centre, and a police station. The village is connected to the BR-210 highway.
