= Vila Velha (disambiguation) =

Vila Velha may refer to:

- Vila Velha, a coastal city in Espírito Santo, Brazil
- Vila Velha de Ródão, a Portuguese town
- Vila Velha do Cassiporé, a village in Amapá, Brazil
- Battle of Vila Velha, a 1762 battle at Vila Velha de Ródão
- Pereira (Bahia), a lost colony in Salvador, Bahia, Brazil later known as Vila Velha
- Vila Velha State Park, a Park in Paraná, Brazil
- Vila Velha Theater, a theater in Salvador, Bahia, Brazil
