= Palikur =

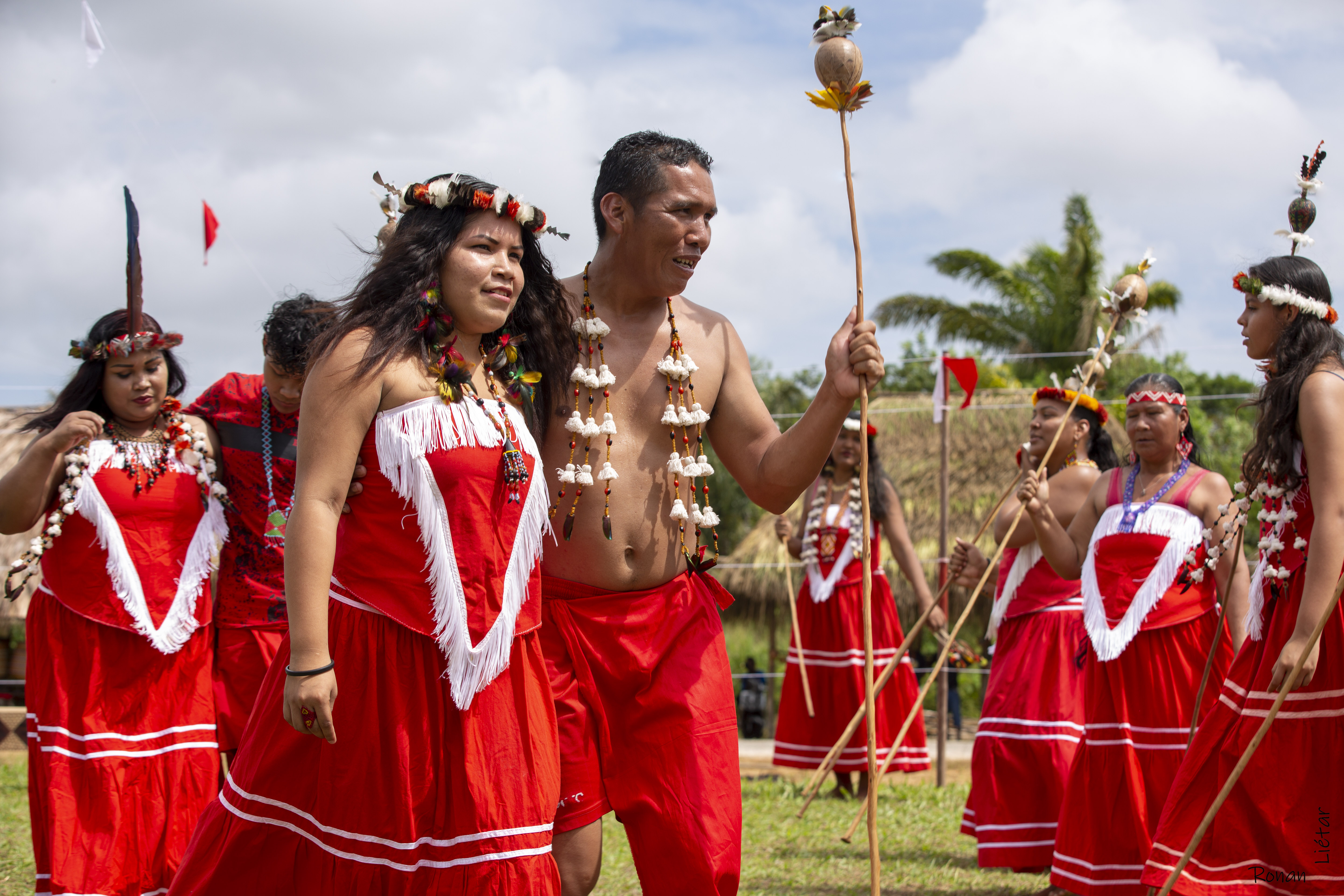
- Traditional dance of the Palikur (2019)

Total population
- ca. 2,300 (2015)

Regions with significant populations
- Brazil (Amapá): ca. 1,400
- French Guiana: ca. 900

Languages
- Pa’ikwaki language, French Guianese Creole

Religion
- Animism (traditionally) and Pentecostalism

The Palikur are an Indigenous people located in the riverine areas of the Brazilian state of Amapá and in French Guiana, particularly in the south-eastern border region, on the north bank of the Oyapock River. The Palikur Nation, or naoné, is Arawak-speaking and socially organized in clans. In 2015, the estimated population was 2,300 people of which 1,400 lived in Brazil and 900 in French Guiana.

== Names ==
The Palikur people are also known as the Paricuria, Paricores, Palincur, Parikurene, Parinkur-Iéne, Païkwené, Pa'ikwené, Aricours, Aukuyene, Karipúna-Palikúr, Palicur, Palijur, Palikour, Paricura, Paricuri, or Parucuria people.

== History ==
The location of the Palikur near the mouths of the Amazon made them one of the first Amazonian tribes ever encountered by Europeans. As early as 1507 their name was recorded by the Spanish explorer Vicente Yañez Pinzón. By the middle of the 17th century, there was an estimated 1,200 Palikur population, of which were 400 bowmen, about one third of their total population living between the Cassiporé and Maroni rivers. They were engaged in a century-long war with the Galibi, and resisted missionary activities. The Palikur were also embroiled in the protracted colonial rivalry between Portugal and France for control of the region, extending south of Ile de Cayenne (French Guiana) into what today constitutes the Brazilian state of Amapá. A Portuguese expedition of the late 18th century burned all Indian villages in the territory, which was then under French influence, and deported the Palikur, who had become allies with the French, into the interior of Brazil. Consequently, the Palikur remained isolated for much of the next century. After Amapá was finally conceded to Brazil in 1900, some 200 to 300 Palikur chose to move from Brazil to French Guiana, where they had long enjoyed good relations with the Créole population.

Prejudice against Indigenous peoples of Brazil was strong among non-natives. The Palikur had not forgotten their ancestors' enslavement by the Portuguese. In 1942 the Brazilian Indian Protection Service (SPI) installed a Nationalization Service in the area with the purpose of integrating the natives, but with limited success. As an example, the Palikur elders refused schooling to their people because they perceived it as a form of slavery. In the early 1960s, a community schism following a shamanic war caused part of the Brazilian Palikur community to relocate to French Guiana. Successive waves of migrants have continued to replenish the French Guianese Palikur community. Not until the late 1960s, with the creation of FUNAI, and as they began converting to Pentecostalism, did the Palikur became more responsive to the Brazilian government.

== Settlements ==
Location of the Palikur settlements on the map of Amapá, Brazil. Green are minority settlements.

The area around the Urucaua River is their ancestral territory. Between 1982 and 1991 FUNAI demarked a common area of 5181 km^{2} for the Palikur, the Uaçá Galibi, and the Karipuna do Amapá.

The main settlement of the Palikur is Kumenê. Other settlements in Brazil are Kuahi, Ywawka, Flecha, Mangue 1, Mangue 2, Tawari, Amomni, Kwikwit, Pwaytyeket, Kamuywa, and Urubu.

The Palikur in French Guiana mainly live on the Oyapock River in the village of Trois-Palétuviers, and the main town of Saint-Georges. A part of the population moved to Régina, Roura, Lamirande near Balata, and the neighbourhood of l’îlet Malouin in Cayenne.

== Language ==
The main language is the Palikúr language, both on the Brazilian and French side, French Guianese Creole is used as the common language between tribes or with the local population. Knowledge of French and Portuguese is common. Palikúr is considered endangered in French Guiana, and vulnerable in Brazil.

== Economy ==
The Palikur subsist largely on bow and arrow fishing, supplemented by hunting and horticulture. Manioc, roasted, or used for the preparation of flat cakes and beer, is the main cultivated plant. Sweet potatoes, sugarcane, peppers, gourds, cotton, and papayas, which the Palikur have adopted from the Europeans, along with mangoes, coffee, and citrus trees, are also cultivated. Commercial relations between the Palikur and the Europeans began to intensify in the early 18th century; river and forest products were exchanged for tools, harpoons, clothes and glass beads. Until the end of the 19th century, the main commercial surplus was roasted manioc flour. In the 1940s and 1950s an intense commerce with alligator skins took place, until the alligator population was depleted. The Palikur manufacture objects of wood, bone, feathers, and cotton seed. They are also regionally famous for their basket-ware. Shotguns for hunting and harpoons and cotton fishing lines are being widely used at the present. In French Guiana particularly, a growing number of Palikur are engaging in the market-economy.
