= Macari River =

River in Amapá, Brazil

- Location of mouth

Location
- Country: Brazil

Physical characteristics
- Source
  - location: Amapá state
- Mouth
  - location: Atlantic Ocean
  - coordinates: 1°52′N 50°31′W

Macari River is a river of Amapá state in north-eastern Brazil.

== See also ==
- List of rivers of Amapá
