= Cricou River =

Coordinates: 3°43′13″N 51°55′29″W

Location
- Country: Brazil

Physical characteristics
- Source
  - location: Amapá state

Cricou River is a river of Amapá state in north-eastern Brazil.

== See also ==
- List of rivers of Amapá
