= Urucaua River =

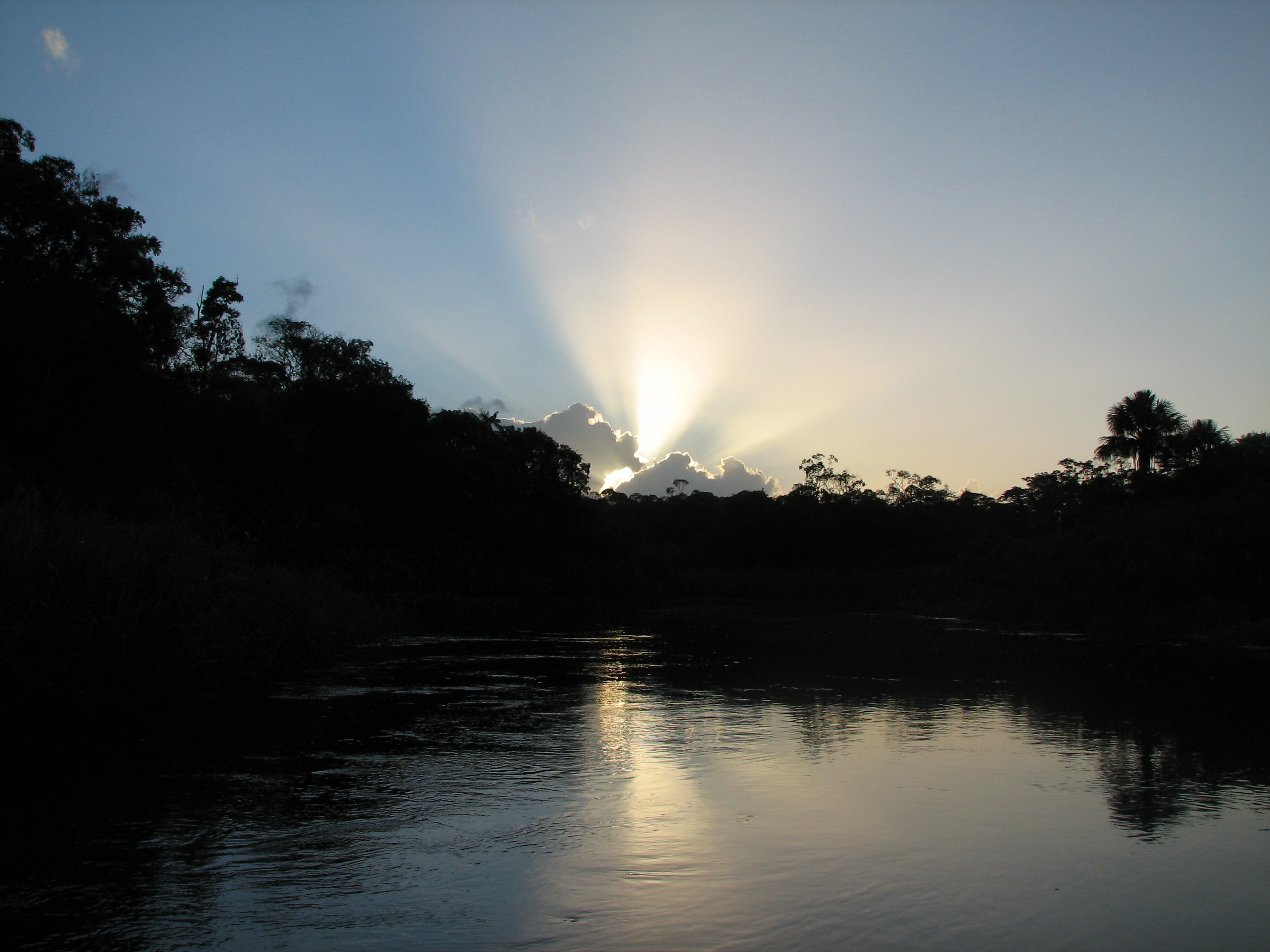
- Sunset on the Urucaua

Location
- Country: Brazil

Physical characteristics
- Source
  - location: Amapá state
- Mouth
  - coordinates: 3°46′N 51°22′W

Urucaua River is a river in the state of Amapá in north-eastern Brazil. The area around the Urucaua River is the ancestral territory of the Palikur. The village of Kumenê is located on the Urucaua River.

== See also ==
- List of rivers of Amapá
