= Falsino River =

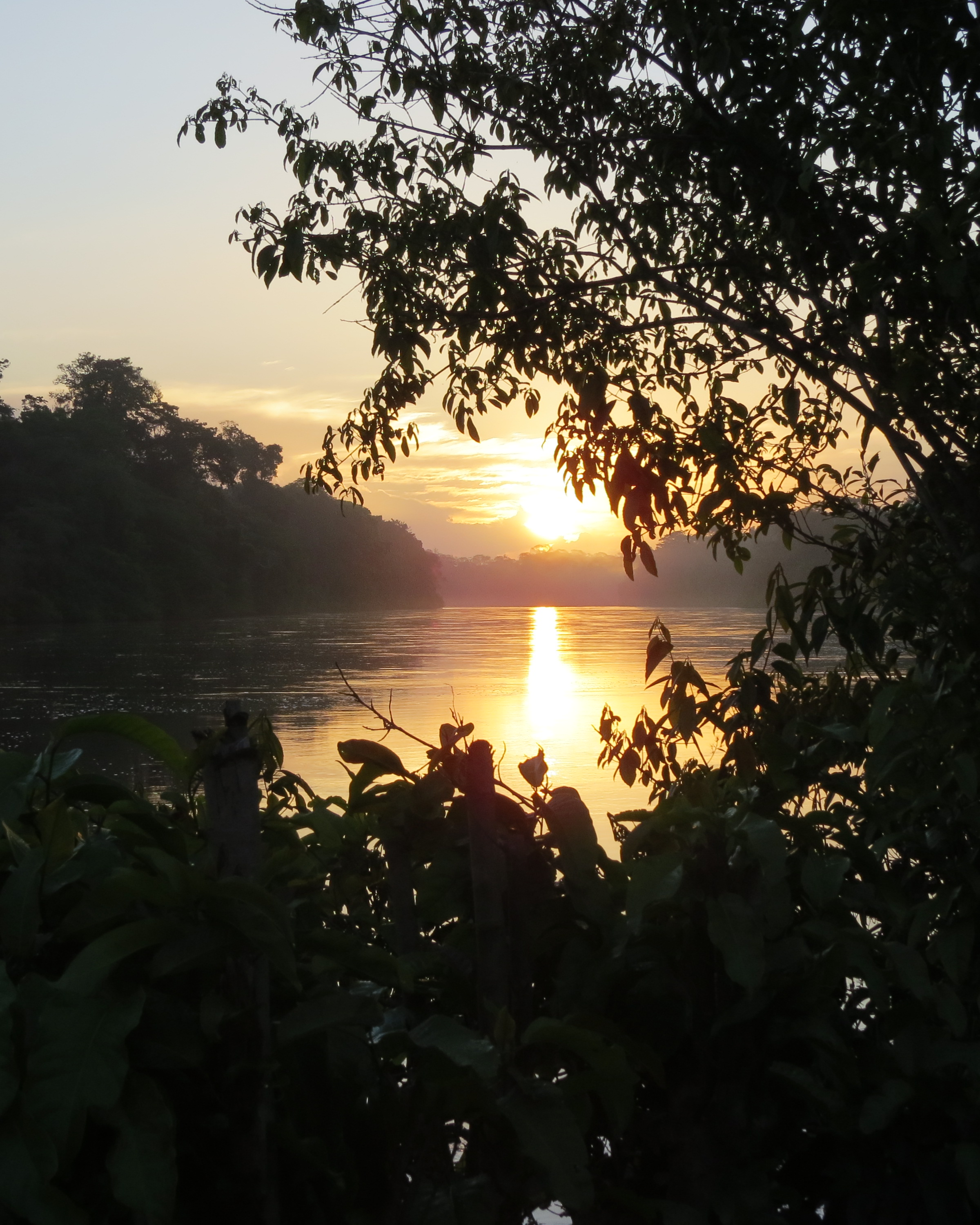

- Location within Brazil
- Native name: Rio Falsino (Portuguese)

Location
- Country: Brazil

Physical characteristics
- Source
  - location: Amapá state
- Mouth
  - coordinates: 0.924699°N 51.594898°W

Basin features
- River system: Araguari River

The Falsino River (Portuguese: Rio Falsino) is a river of Amapá state in north-eastern Brazil. It is a tributary of the Araguari River.

The river defines the eastern boundary of the 460,353 hectares (1,137,560 acres) Amapá National Forest, a sustainable use conservation unit created in 1989.

== See also ==
- List of rivers of Amapá
