= Tacunapi River =

Coordinates: 1°11′04″N 52°22′14″W

Location
- Country: Brazil

Physical characteristics
- Source
  - location: Amapá state

Tacunapi River is a river of Amapá state in north-eastern Brazil.

== See also ==
- List of rivers of Amapá
