= Résidence Arc-en-ciel =

Village in French Guiana

Résidence Arc-en-ciel BP 134
- Village
- Location in French Guiana
- Coordinates: 4.8931°N 52.2867°W
- Country: France
- Overseas region: French Guiana
- Arrondissement: Cayenne
- Commune: Remire-Montjoly

Population (2009)
  - Total: 3,250−4,000
- Time zone: UTC-3

Résidence Arc-en-ciel (English: rainbow residence) or BP 134 is a Brazilian village in the commune of Remire-Montjoly in French Guiana, France. A large part of the population are Karipuna do Amapá Amerindians.

== Overview ==
The Karipuna do Amapá Amerindians used to live in a disputed territory between French Guiana and Brazil. In 1900 their territory was awarded to Brazil, however their primary language is Karipúna French Creole due to prolonged contact with French Guianese.

A group of Karipuna squatted an area near Remire-Montjoly on the outskirts of Cayenne. The village was originally known as BP 134. Other Amerindians joined them, and were followed by people from other parts of Brazil. By 2009, the population of Résidence Arc-en-ciel including illegal residents was estimated between 3,250 and 4,000 people.

In 2000, the inhabitants of Résidence Arc-en-ciel formed DAAC, an organisation for rights, health care and general support for the community. In 2013, the commune of Remire-Montjoly announced the demolition and clearing of the village. In 2017, a program of urban and social development was started.

== Bibliography ==
- Serges, Dorothée (2009). "Informalités normalisées : facteurs d'intégration économique et sociale des Brésiliennes en Guyane française ?" (PDF). Inégalités et Informalités dans les Amériques (in French).
