= Manga, Amapá =

Indigenous village in Oiapoque, Brazil

Manga
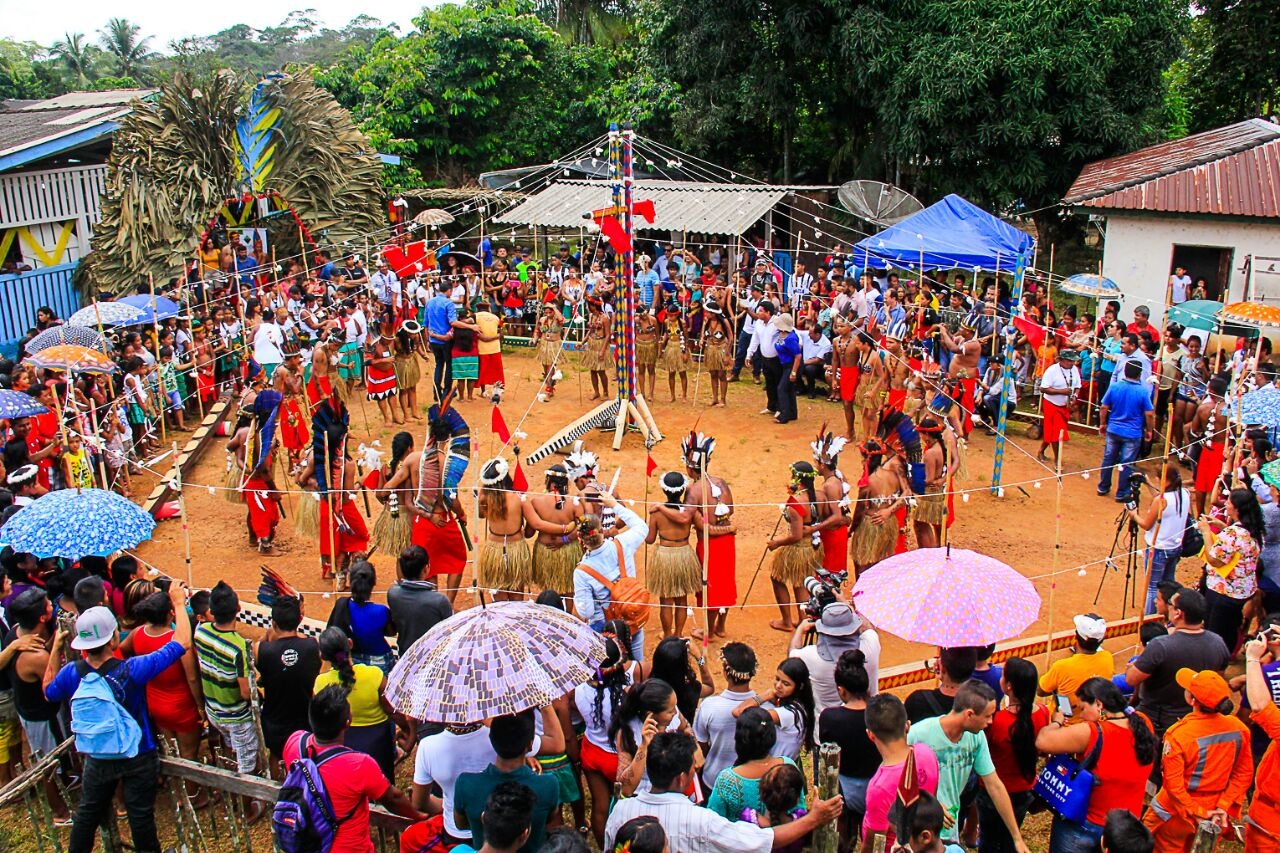
- Indian Day in Manga (2017)

- Location in Brazil Manga (Brazil)
- Coordinates: 3.7242°N 51.7214°W
- Country: Brazil
- Region: North
- State: Amapá
- Municipality: Oiapoque

Government
  - Cacique: Luciano Iaparrá

Population (2016)
  - Total: 1,075
- Time zone: UTC-3

Manga is an Amerindian village of the Karipuna do Amapá people in the Brazilian municipality of Oiapoque, Amapá. It is the largest village of the tribe. Manga is located on the Caripi River in the Uaçá Indigenous Territory.

== Overview ==
Manga is located in an area which was disputed between French Guiana and Brazil. In the 19th century, Amerindian people from several tribes and non-indigenous people settled in the neutral territory. In 1900, the territory was awarded to Brazil, however the main language spoken in Manga is Karipúna French Creole.

In 1976, a school was established in Manga where the children were taught in Portuguese In 1996, bilingual education was provided. The village has a clinic, and a community house.

Manga can be accessed via an unpaved road which connects to the BR-156 highway. Electricity is provided using Diesel generators. In 2015 work started on a hydro-electric power station in Oiapoque which will also supply electricity for Manga. In 2018, Manga hosted a three-day meeting of the indigenous people in the Brazilian, French Guianan and Surinamese region.

== Bibliography ==
- Gonçalves Fonseca, Mary (2019). Currículo e construção da identidade Karipuna na Aldeia Manga, Amapá (Thesis). São Paulo: Pontifical Catholic University of São Paulo.
