= Cupixi River =

Coordinates: 0°37′22″N 51°45′34″W

Location
- Country: Brazil

Physical characteristics
- Source
  - location: Amapá state

Cupixi River is a river of Amapá state in north-eastern Brazil.

== See also ==
- List of rivers of Amapá
