= Caripi River =

- Caripi River near Santa Isabel

Location
- Country: Brazil

Physical characteristics
- Source
  - location: Amapá state
- Mouth: Uaçá River
  - coordinates: 3°56′N 51°27′W

The Caripi River (also Curupi) is a river of Amapá state in north-eastern Brazil. The Karipuna do Amapá Amerindians are located on along the river. Manga is the main settlement on the river.

== See also ==
- List of rivers of Amapá
