= Inipaco River =

Coordinates: 1°14′N 53°02′W

Location
- Country: Brazil

Physical characteristics
- Source
  - location: Amapá state

Inipaco River is a river of Amapá state in north-eastern Brazil.

== See also ==
- List of rivers of Amapá
