= Cutias =

Municipality in Amapá, Brazil

- Municipality
- Cutias do Araguari; Município de Cutias do Araguari (Portuguese)
- Flag Coat of arms

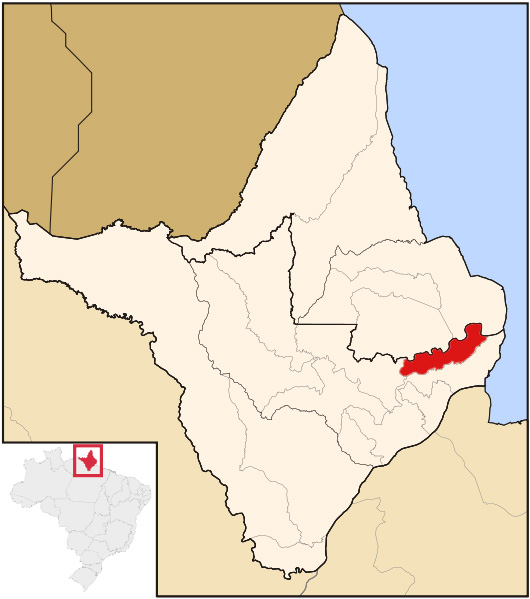
- Cutias do Araguari in the state of Amapá

- Location within Brazil
- Coordinates: 00°59′09″N 50°48′07″W
- Country: Brazil
- Region: North
- State: Amapá
- Established: 1 May 1992

Government
  - Mayor: Raimundo Barbosa Amanajás Filho (PROS)

Area
  - Land: 2,115 km^{2} (817 sq mi)
- Elevation: 6 m (20 ft)

Population (2020)
  - Total: 6,101
  - Density: 2.885/km^{2} (7.471/sq mi)
- Time zone: UTC−3 (BRT)

Cutias, formally known as Cutias do Araguari (Brazilian Portuguese: [kuˈtʃi.ɐz du aɾɐɡwaˈɾi]), is a municipality located in the southeast of the state of Amapá, Brazil. Its population is 6,101 and its area is 2,115 square kilometres (817 mi^{2}). The name of the municipality comes from a rodent of the same name, known in English as the agouti. Cutias do Araguari was elevated to the level of municipality on 1 May 1992.

== Geography ==
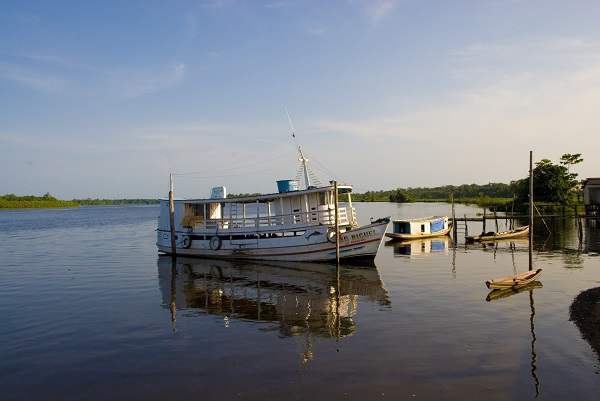
Araguari River in Cutias

Cutias is bordered by Pracuúba and Amapá to the north, Macapá to the south, Macapá to the east, and Ferreira Gomes to the west. It is 120 metres (390 ft) from the state capitol of Macapá. Cutias is dominated by the Araguari River and its tributaries, which partially submerges the area for nearly half the year. It is very flat, with the highest point reaching only 3 metres (9.8 ft) above sea level. Cutias has a wet, tropical climate; it averages 2,800 mm of rain per year, and has an average humidity of 80%.

== Economy ==
The economy is based on maize and manioc production, raising livestock, and fishing. In 2016, Cutias had the second largest amount of buffalos in Brazil. Cutias do Araguari is the largest exporter of pirarucú (arapaima) in Brazil, an endangered fish noted for its boneless steaks. The common agouti, from which the municipality takes its name, is also used in local cuisine.

== Tourism ==
The town became known during the pororoca craze which attracted surfers to the Araguari River which has large tidal bores.

== See also ==
- List of municipalities in Amapá
