= Flechal River =

River in Amapá, Brazil

- Location of mouth

Location
- Country: Brazil
- State: Amapá

Physical characteristics
- Source
  - location: Amapá state
- Mouth
  - coordinates: 2°8′N 50°42′W

Flechal River is a river of Amapá state in north-eastern Brazil.

== See also ==
- List of rivers of Amapá
