= Tangararé River =

Location
- Country: Brazil

Physical characteristics
- Source
  - location: Amapá state
- Mouth
  - coordinates: 2°22′N 52°40′W

Tangararé River is a river of Amapá state in north-eastern Brazil.

== See also ==
- List of rivers of Amapá
