= Estrada de Ferro do Amapá =

Amapá Railway
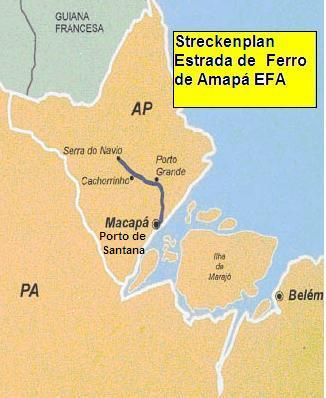
- Map of the line

Overview
- Native name: Estrada de Ferro do Amapá
- Status: Ceased operation
- Owner: Bethlehem Steel / MMX Mineração e Metálicos
- Locale: Amapá, Brazil
- Termini: Serra do Navio; Port of Santana
- Stations: 5

Service
- Type: Freight rail & Passenger rail

Technical
- Line length: 194 kilometres (121 mi)
- Character: At-grade
- Track gauge: 4 ft 8 1/2 in (1,435 mm) standard gauge

The Amapá Railway is a former rail line built by Bethlehem Steel to exploit the manganese deposits in the territory of Amapá (now a state), Brazil. It is 4 ft 8 1/2 in (1,435 mm) standard gauge, the only railway in the country to use this gauge aside from Lines 4-6 of the São Paulo Metro. The line was also in use for passenger transport.

The line was about 194 kilometres (121 mi), spanning from mines near Serra do Navio to the port city of Santana. The rail line stopped transporting ore in 2014, and as of 2020, remains derelict.

== See also ==
- Rail transport in Brazil
