= Mutum River (Amapá) =

- Location within Brazil
- Native name: Rio Mutum (Portuguese)

Location
- Country: Brazil

Physical characteristics
- Source
  - location: Amapá state
- Mouth
  - location: Araguari River
  - coordinates: 1.317789°N 51.989536°W

Basin features
- River system: Araguari River

The Mutum River (Portuguese: Rio Mutum) is a river of Amapá state in north-eastern Brazil. It is a left tributary of the Araguari River.

The river defines the northern boundary of the 460,353 hectares (1,137,560 acres) Amapá National Forest, a sustainable use conservation unit created in 1989.

== See also ==
- List of rivers of Amapá
