= São Luís River (Amapá) =

Location
- Country: Brazil

Physical characteristics
- Source
  - location: Amapá state
- Mouth
  - coordinates: 0°57′S 52°7′W

São Luís River is a river of Amapá state in north-eastern Brazil.

== See also ==
- List of rivers of Amapá
