= Tartarugalzinho River =

Coordinates: 1°32′N 50°54′W

Location
- Country: Brazil

Physical characteristics
- Source
  - location: Amapá state

Tartarugalzinho River is a river of Amapá state in north-eastern Brazil.

== See also ==
- List of rivers of Amapá
