= Anotaié River =

Coordinates: 3°29′58″N 52°04′21″W

Location
- Country: Brazil

Physical characteristics
- Source
  - location: Amapá state

Anotaié River is a river of Amapá state in north-eastern Brazil.

== See also ==
- List of rivers of Amapá
