= Calçoene River =

Coordinates: 2°30′25″N 50°49′15″W

Location
- Country: Brazil

Physical characteristics
- Source
  - location: Amapá state

Calçoene River is a river of Amapá state in north-eastern Brazil.

In 1894, the river was at the heart of gold rush with there were 6,000 to 10,000 gold miners active in and around the river.

== See also ==
- List of rivers of Amapá
