= Macapá International Airport =

Macapá−Alberto Alcolumbre International Airport Aeroporto Internacional de Macapá−Alberto Alcolumbre
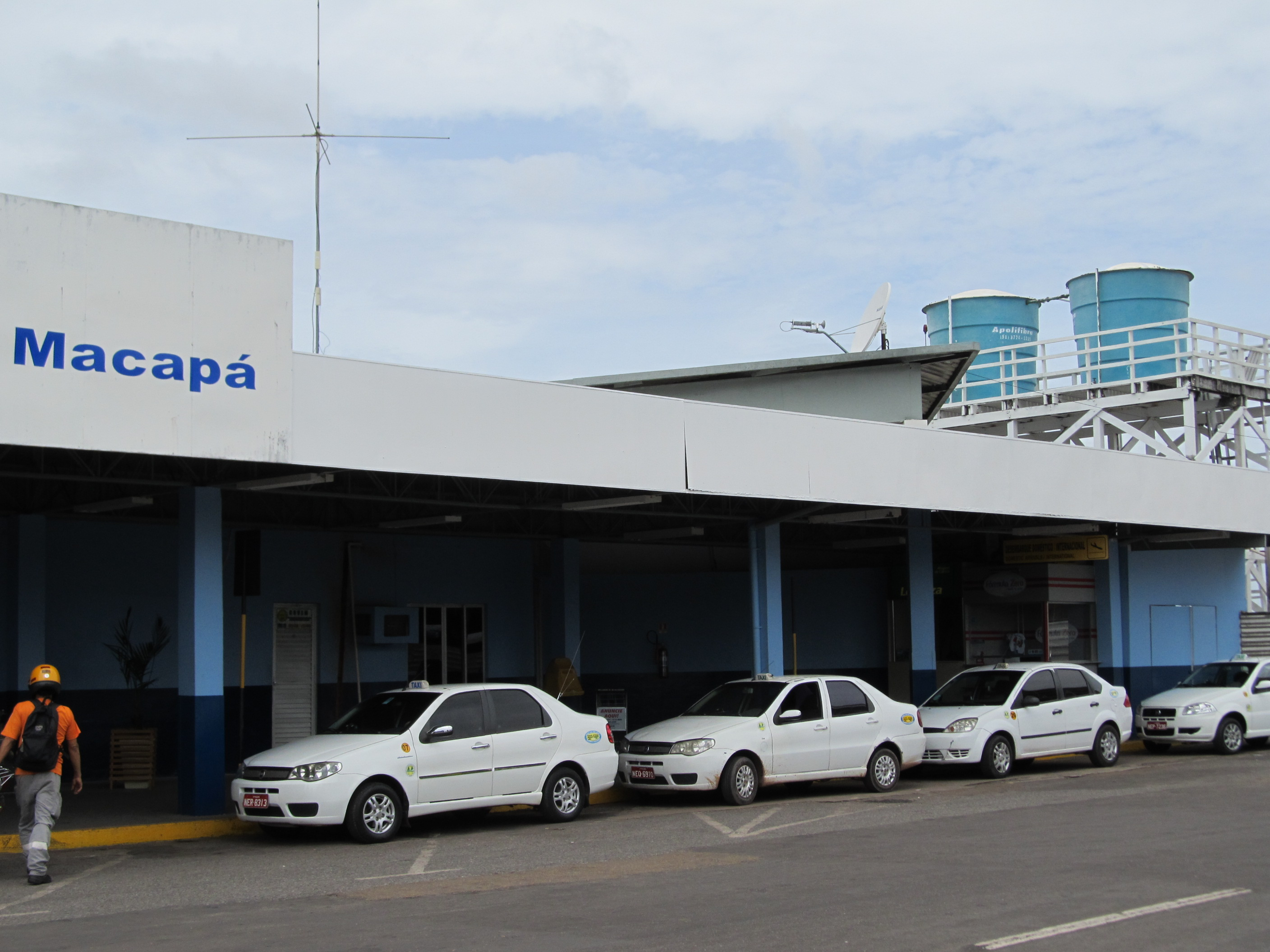
- IATA: MCP; ICAO: SBMQ; LID: AP0001

Summary
- Airport type: Public
- Operator: Infraero (1979–2022); NOA (2022–present)
- Serves: Macapá
- Time zone: BRT (UTC−03:00)
- Elevation AMSL: 17 m (56 ft)
- Coordinates: 00°03′02″N 051°04′20″W

Map
- Location in Brazil MCP (Brazil)

Runways
Direction	Length		Surface
Direction	m	ft	Surface
08/26	2,100	6,890	Asphalt

Statistics (2025)
- Passengers: 577,943 ▲3%
- Aircraft Operations: 9,878 ▲9%
- Statistics: NOA; Sources: ANAC, DECEA

Macapá−Alberto Alcolumbre International Airport (IATA: MCP, ICAO: SBMQ) is the airport serving Macapá, Brazil. Since April 22, 2009 the airport is named after Alberto Alcolumbre, a local businessman.

The airport is operated by Consortium Novo Norte (NOA).

== History ==
The airport was opened in 1970.

Because of the Free Trade Zone of Macapá and Santana, regulated by the Federal Law 8.387, of December 30, 1991 at Macapá International Airport anyone, passengers (domestic and international) or visitors, can purchase goods at the Duty Free Shops.

On April 12, 2019, a new terminal was opened replacing an older facility. Following its closure, the old terminal was demolished to make room for an enlarged apron.

Previously operated by Infraero, on August 18, 2022, the consortium Novo Norte formed by the Brazilian companies Socicam and Dix won a 30-year concession to operate the airport.

== Airlines and destinations ==
Airlines	Destinations
Azul Brazilian Airlines	Belém, Belo Horizonte–Confins; Charter: Oiapoque
Gol Linhas Aéreas	Belém, Rio de Janeiro–Galeão
LATAM Brasil	Belém, Brasília, São Paulo–Guarulhos

== Statistics ==
Following is the number of passenger, aircraft and cargo movements at the airport, according to Infraero (2007-July 2023) and NOA (August 2023-2025) reports:

Year	Passenger	Aircraft	Cargo (t)
2025	577,943 ▲3%	9,878 ▲9%	
2024	547,375 ▼9%	8,254 ▼13%	
2023	604,775 ▲4%	9,455 ▲3%	
2022	584,266 ▲27%	9,168 ▲15%	2,761 ▲15%
2021	458,372 ▲24%	8,005 ▲13%	2,409 ▲37%
2020	370,411 ▼39%	7,104 ▼10%	1,755 ▼37%
2019	605,765 ▲11%	7,916 ▼6%	2,773 ▼8%
2018	546,030 ▼5%	8,411 ▼7%	3,002 ▲13%
2017	576,257 ▲1%	9,087 ▼4%	2,653 ▲6%
2016	568,873 ▼15%	9,488 ▼10%	2,506 ▲1%
2015	667,230 ▼11%	10,508 ▼23%	2,482 ▼31%
2014	748,480 ▲13%	13,606 ▼2%	3,579 ▲1%
2013	663,524 ▲16%	13,924 ▲11%	3,554 ▲19%
2012	573,560 ▲2%	12,572 ▼1%	2,986 ▼11%
2011	560,317 ▲3%	12,752 ▼7%	3,364 ▲3%
2010	542,053 ▲15%	13,653 ▲13%	3,264 ▼15%
2009	469,836 ▼5%	12,059 ▼11%	3,847 ▲2%
2008	493,999 ▼6%	13,613 ▲6%	3,778 ▲2%
2007	526,570	12,821	3,704

== Incident ==
- 4 July 1970: a Cruzeiro do Sul NAMC YS-11 en route from Belém-Val de Cans to Macapá was hijacked by 1 person and flown to Cayenne, Georgetown, Trinidad and Tobago, Antigua and Jamaica.

== Access ==
The airport is located 3 km (2 mi) from downtown Macapá.

== See also ==
- List of airports in Brazil
