= Cunani River =

Coordinates: 2°48′38″N 50°56′22″W

Location
- Country: Brazil

Physical characteristics
- Source
  - location: Amapá state

Cunani River is a river of Amapá state in north-eastern Brazil.

== See also ==
- List of rivers of Amapá
