= Mutura River =

Coordinates: 2°35′42″N 52°31′49″W

Location
- Country: Brazil

Physical characteristics
- Source
  - location: Amapá state

Mutura River is a river of Amapá state in north-eastern Brazil.

== See also ==
- List of rivers of Amapá
