= Amapá Grande River =

Coordinates: 2°07′11″N 50°45′00″W

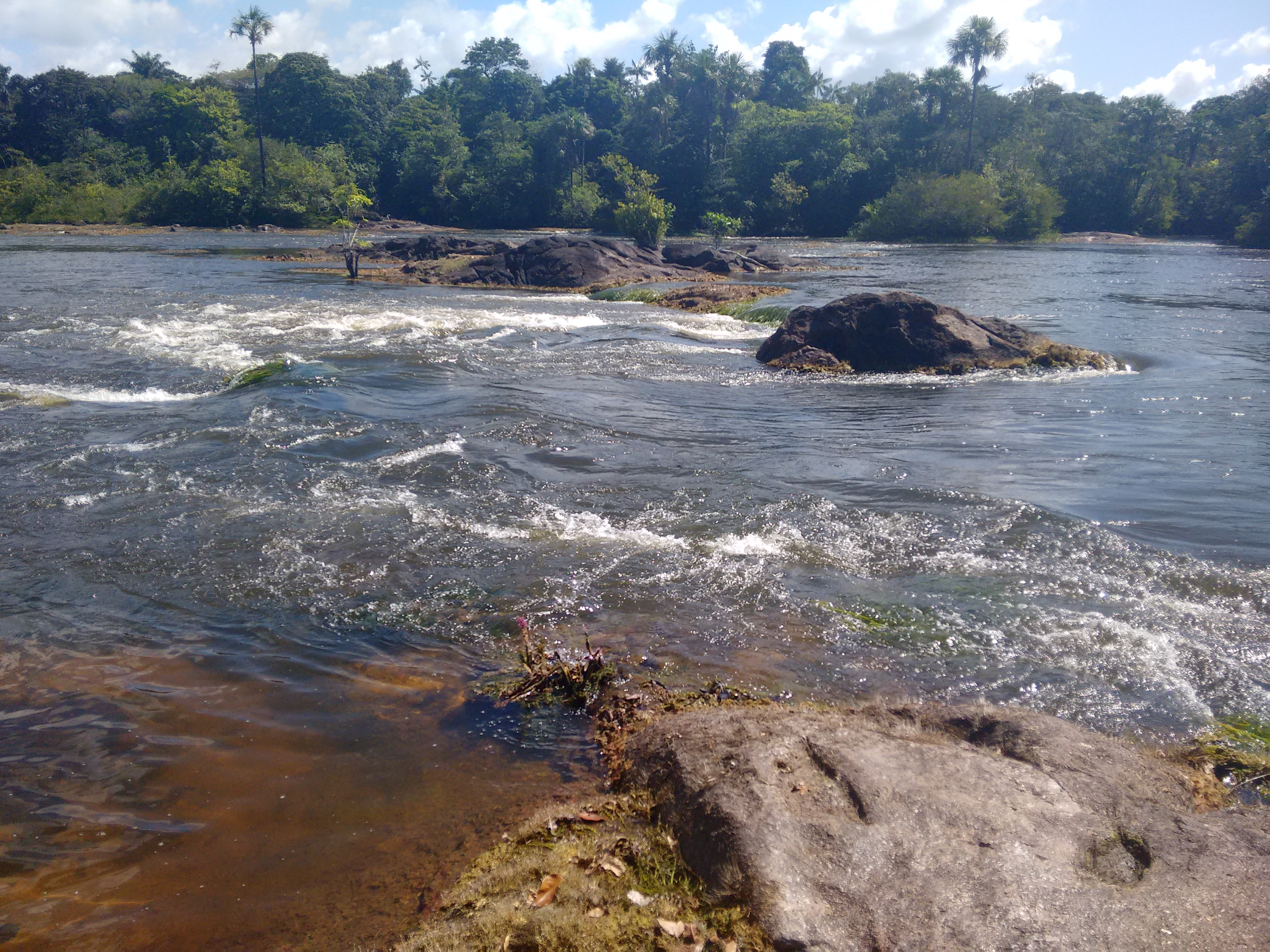
- Cachoeira Grande waterfalls

Location
- Country: Brazil

Physical characteristics
- Source
  - location: Amapá state

Amapá Grande River is a river of Amapá state in eastern Brazil.

== See also ==
- List of rivers of Amapá
