= Aporema River =

Coordinates: 1°14′10″N 50°53′31″W

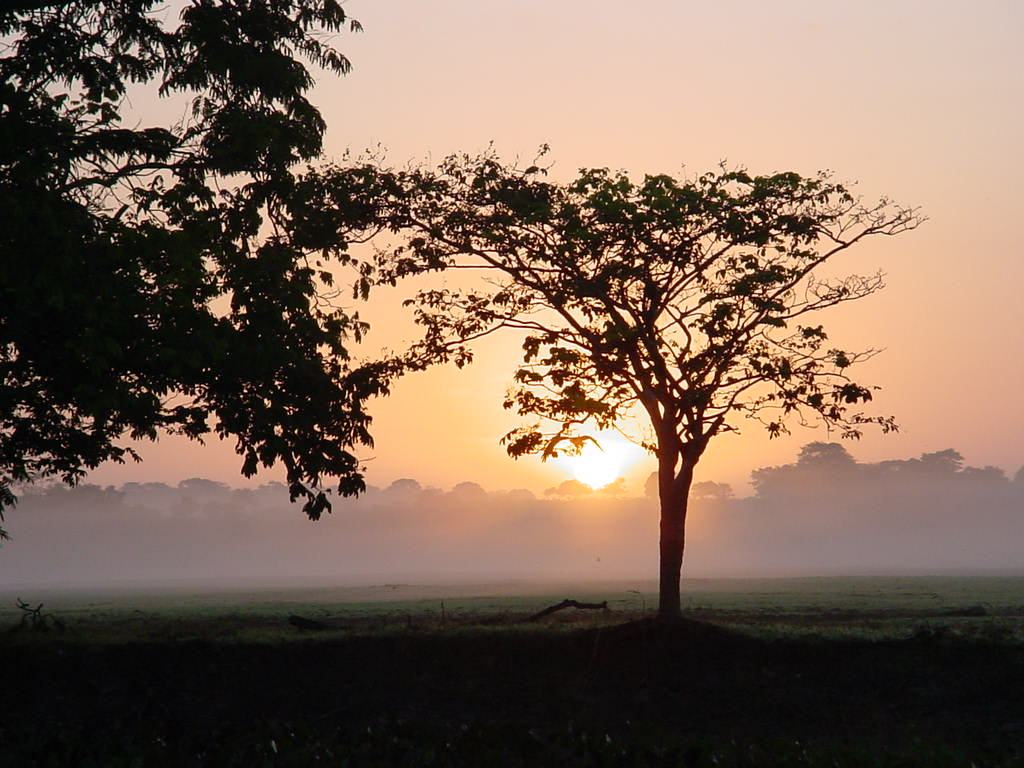

Location
- Country: Brazil

Physical characteristics
- Source
  - location: Amapá state

Aporema River is a river of Amapá state in north-eastern Brazil.

== See also ==
- List of rivers of Amapá
