= Iaué River =

Location
- Country: Brazil

Physical characteristics
- Source
  - location: Amapá state
- Mouth: Oyapock River
  - coordinates: 2°54′N 52°22′W

Iaué River is a river of Amapá state in north-eastern Brazil.

== See also ==
- List of rivers of Amapá
