= Camaipi River do Maracá River =

Coordinates: 0°1′N 51°57′W

Location
- Country: Brazil

Physical characteristics
- Source
  - location: Amapá state

Camaipi River do Maracá River is a river of Amapá state in north-eastern Brazil.

== See also ==
- List of rivers of Amapá
