= Araguari River (Amapá) =

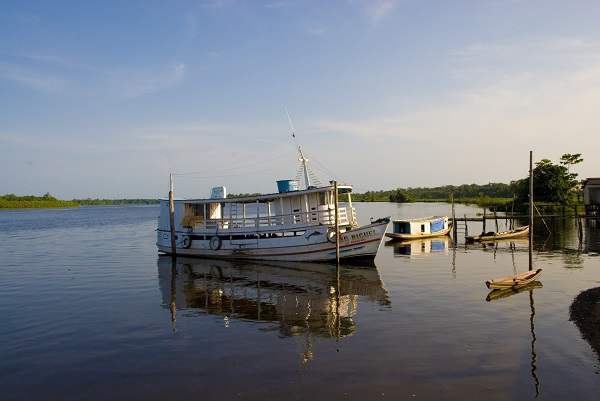
- Araguari River in Cutias

- Location within Brazil
- Native name: Rio Araguari (Portuguese)

Location
- Country: Brazil

Physical characteristics
- Source
  - location: Amapá state
- Mouth
  - location: Atlantic Ocean
  - coordinates: 1.25°N 49.916667°W
- Length: 560 kilometres (350 mi)
- Basin size: 42,712 square kilometres (16,491 sq mi)

Basin features
- Tributaries
  - left: Mutum River, Falsino River

The Araguari River (Portuguese: Rio Araguari) is the primary river of Amapá state in north-eastern Brazil. It became famous among surfers when some decided to ride its constant pororoca tidal bore, characterizing waves that can last for several minutes. In 2013, three dams were built in the river to generate hydroelectricity. The dams ended the tidal bore which altered the flow of water in the Amazon, and caused significant land erosion and damage to the Bailique Archipelago.

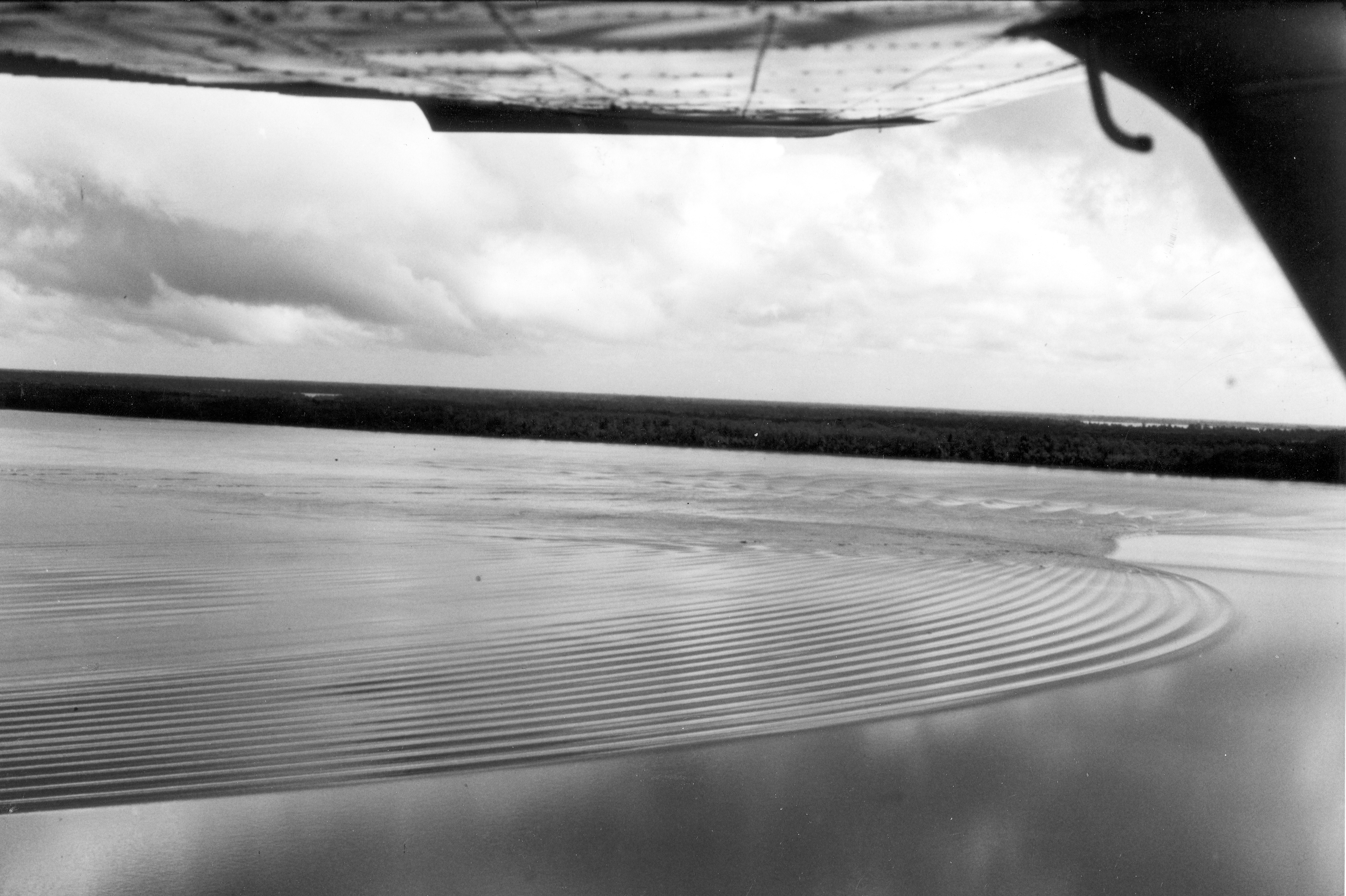
Undular bore and whelps near the mouth of Araguari River. View is oblique toward mouth from airplane at approximately 100 ft (30 m) altitude.

The river flows through the Uatuma-Trombetas moist forests ecoregion. The river defines the western boundary of the 460,353 hectares (1,137,560 acres) Amapá National Forest, a sustainable use conservation unit created in 1989.

== See also ==
- List of rivers of Amapá
