= Vila Velha do Cassiporé =

District of Oiapoque, Brazil

- Location in Brazil Vila Velha do Cassiporé (Brazil)
- Coordinates: 3.2094°N 51.2308°W
- Country: Brazil
- Region: North
- State: Amapá
- Municipality: Oiapoque

Area
  - Total: 8,509 km^{2} (3,285 sq mi)

Population (2010)
  - Total: 2,723
  - Density: 0.3200/km^{2} (0.8288/sq mi)
- Time zone: UTC−3 (BRT)

Vila Velha do Cassiporé (or Vila Velha) is a village and district in the Brazilian municipality of Oiapoque, Amapá. It is located on the Cassiporé River. Vila Velha is in a protected area near the Cabo Orange National Park. In 2016, it was recognised as a Quilombo (escaped slaves) settlement.

== Overview ==
Vila Velha do Cassiporé is located in a territory which was disputed between France and Brazil. The region attracted escaped Brazilian slaves. In the 19th century, gold was discovered in the Cassiporé River. In 1900, the territory was awarded to Brazil.

In 1951, Vila Velha do Cassiporé became a district of the municipality of Oiapoque. In 1957, the population of the village was estimated at about 250 people. In 1999, INCRA established an agricultural community in Vila Velha. In 2016, the village was recognised as a Quilombo settlement, and has been allocated a territory comparable to the indigenous territories.

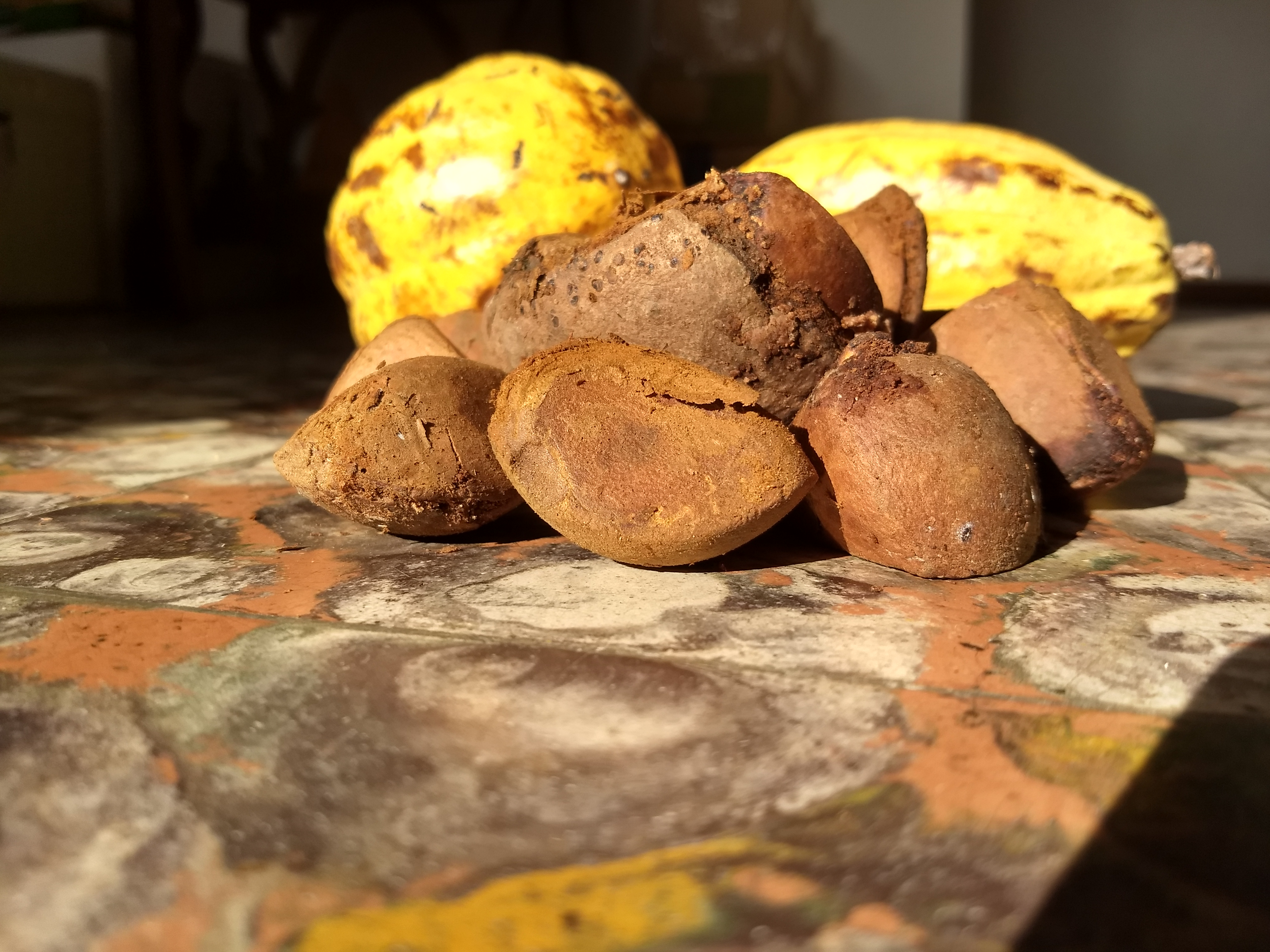
Cocao and andiroba from the Cassiporé region

Vila Velha do Cassiporé has a school and a clinic, however a 2018 investigation revealed that both were not meeting basic requirements. The village used to accessible by boat only which amounted to a day's journey from Oiapoque. In 2015, a road opened connecting the village to the BR-156 highway. The economy is mainly based on agriculture. The main export products are watermelons and cocoa.

Near the village, archaeological items such as ceramic burial jars, rock axes, and copper jingle bells were discovered dating from before 1500. In 2017, a plan was developed by National Institute of Historic and Artistic Heritage and the local community to investigate and protect the site.
