= Culari River =

River in Amapá, Brazil

Coordinates: 1°25′42″N 53°42′44″W

Culari River is a river of Amapá state in Brazil. It is a tributary of the Jari River which is part of the Amazon River basin.
