= Jupati River =

Coordinates: 0°41′N 50°25′W

Jupati River is a river of Amapá state in Brazil. It is a tributary of the Amazon River.
