= Maruanum River =

River in Amapá, Brazil

Coordinates: 0°09′17″N 51°11′19″W

Maruanum River is a river of Amapá state in Brazil. It is a tributary of the Amazon River.
