= Mapiri River =

River in Amapá, Brazil

Coordinates: 0°42′N 53°7′W

Mapiri River is a river of Amapá state in Brazil. It is a tributary of the Jari River which is part of the Amazon River basin.
