= Matapi River =

River in Amapá, Brazil

Coordinates: 0°3′S 51°12′W

Matapi River is a river of Amapá state in Brazil. It is a tributary of the Amazon River.
