= Palikúr language =

Arawakan language spoken in Brazil and French Guiana

Palikúr
- Karipuna
- Pa'ikwaki
- Native to: Brazil, French Guiana
- Ethnicity: Palikur, formerly Karipuna do Amapá
- Native speakers: (1,500 cited 2000–2010)
- Language family: Arawakan: Northern; Palikuran; Palikúr

Language codes
- ISO 639-3: plu – inclusive code Individual code: kgm – Karipúna (retired)
- Glottolog: pali1279
- ELP: Palikur

Palikúr (Brazilian Portuguese: Palicur, French: Palikur) is an Arawakan language of Brazil and French Guiana, spoken by the Palikur and formerly the Karipuna do Amapá. Knowledge of French and Portuguese is common among the Palikur, and French Guianese Creole is used as the common language among the tribes in the area and with the local population. Palikúr is considered endangered in French Guiana and vulnerable in Brazil.

== History ==
The name "Palikur" is first mentioned in 1513 as "Paricura" by Vicente Yáñez Pinzón. However, regular mention of the Palikur only began around the mid-17th century, starting with the expedidition of Father Antoine Biet in 1653.

== Phonology ==
=== Consonants ===
		Labial	Alveolar	Palatal	Velar	Glottal
Plosive	voiceless	p	t		k	
Plosive	voiced	b	d		ɡ	
Fricative			s	ʃ		h
Sonorant		m	n	j	w	

- The plosives are unreleased [p̚, t̚, k̚, b̚, d̚, ɡ̚] word-finally.
- /p/ may be realized as [v] or [β] before /i, u/ or intervocalically.
- /n, t, d/ are palatalized [ɲ, tʃ, dʒ] before /i, ĩ/.

=== Vowels ===
	Front		Central		Back	
	oral	nasal	oral	nasal	oral	nasal
Close	i	ĩ			u	ũ
Mid	e	ẽ			o	õ
Open			a	ã		

- /e, o/ are heard as open-mid [ɛ, ɔ] within different positions.
- /a/ is heard as nasal and near-open [ɐ̃] when preceding a nasal consonant.

== Pronouns ==
Palikúr has dependent and independent personal pronouns. The verb marks the object by using suffixes, but not the subject, which must appear in the form of a nominal group or as an independent pronoun. This affixation of only the object and not of the subject is linguistically very rare: the norm is the affixation for both or for only the subject. The noun complement is marked by a possessive prefix.

Palikúr	English	Prefixes Noun, Relation, Subject of Verb	Suffixes Object of verb	Independent Pronouns
1sg	I	n(u)-	-(u)n	náhu
2sg	you (singular)	pi-	-pi	písu
3msg	he	ri-	-ri	irV
3fsg	she	ru-	-ru	erV
1pl.incl	we (inclusive)	u-	-wi	wísu
1pl.excl	we (exclusive)	w(a)-		u-su
2pl	you (plural)	ji-	-ji	jí-su
3pl	they	ri-...-kisV, ru-...-kisV	-rikisV, rukisV	irV-kisV

== Loanwords ==
Palikúr has several loanwords, many of which are wildlife-related, from the Carib language, including:

English	Palikúr	Carib
Sloth	waikuli	waikore
Anteater	tamanua	tamaanuwa
Giant armadillo	malulaima	manuraimo
Paca	urana	urana
Agouti	kuʃiwai	akusiwai
Peccary	pakira	pakiira
Coati	kuwaʃ	kuwasi
Otter	saruru	sarooro
Squirrel monkey	akarma	akarima
Pied tamarin	kusiri	kusiri
Spider monkey	kuwata	kuwata
Hummingbird	tukusi	tukuʔsi
Juruti	wilusi	werusi
Thrush	kuwaswi	kurasiwai
Southern American bushmaster	urukru	urukuku
Tortoise	wajamu	wajaamu
Giant Amazonian ants	irakrĩ	irako
