= Curapi River =

Coordinates: 1°24′23″N 53°51′21″W

Curapi River is a river of Amapá state in north Brazil. It is a tributary of the Jari River which is part of the Amazon River basin. It is 2,000km north of Brasilia.

The area around the Rio Curapi is mainly covered in evergreen broadleaf forest. The area around the Rio Curapi is almost unpopulated, with less than two inhabitants per square kilometer.
