= Piaçaca River =

River in Amapá, Brazil

Coordinates: 0°27′N 51°33′W

Piaçaca River is a river of Amapá state in Brazil. It is a tributary of the Vila Nova River which in turn is part of the Amazon River basin.
