= Iratapina River =

Location
- Country: Brazil

Physical characteristics
- Source
  - location: Amapá state
- Mouth: Jari River
  - coordinates: 0°17′S 52°41′W

Iratapina River is a river of Amapá state in Brazil. It is a tributary of the Jari River, which is part of the Amazon River basin.
