= Preto River (Amapá) =

River in Amapá, Brazil

Coordinates: 0°19′S 51°21′W

The Preto River is a river of Amapá state in Brazil. It is a tributary of the Amazon River.

== See also ==
- List of rivers of Amazonas
