= Pedreira River =

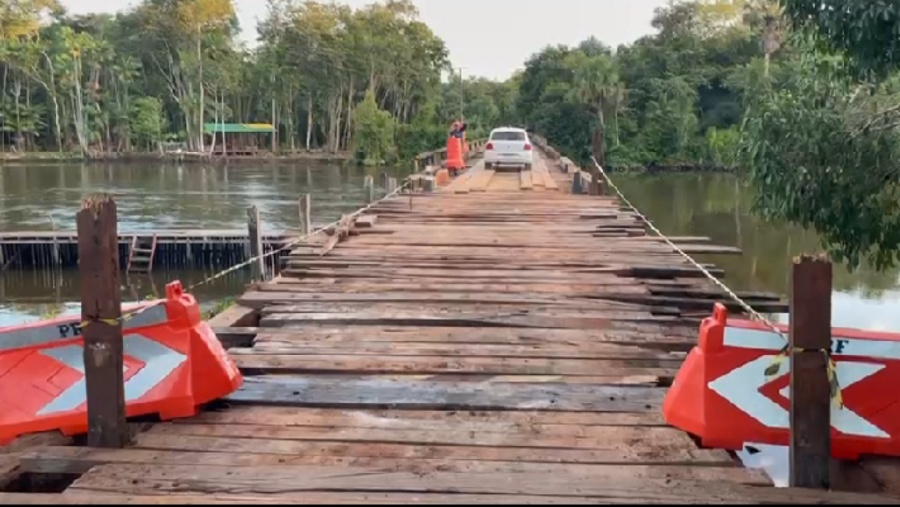
- Santo Antônio da Pedreira Bridge over the Pedreira River

Location
- Country: Brazil

Physical characteristics
- Source
  - location: Amapá state
  - coordinates: 0°13′02″N 50°46′12″W
- Mouth
  - elevation: Amazon River

Pedreira River is a river of Amapá state in Brazil. It is a tributary of the Amazon River.
