= Indigenous Peoples Day (Brazil) =

Annual Brazilian celebration

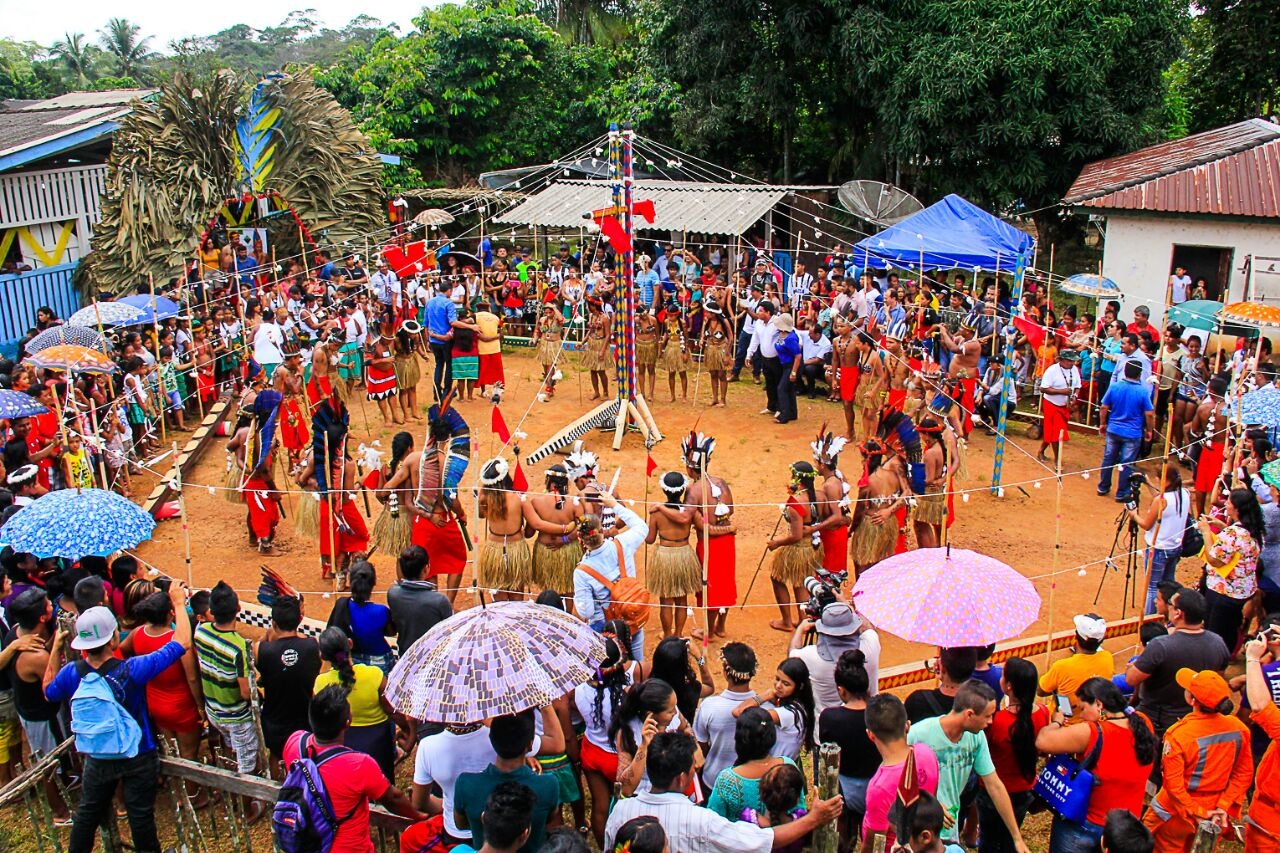
- Celebration of Indigenous Peoples Day in Manga, Amapá (2017)
- Official name: Indigenous People's Day; Dia dos Povos Indígenas
- Observed by: Native Brazilians
- Celebrations: festivities centered in Indigenous reservations
- Date: April 19
- Next time: 19 April 2027
- Frequency: annual
- Related to: Indigenous people of Brazil

In Brazil Indigenous Peoples Day (Portuguese: Dia dos Povos Indígenas), observed annually on April 19, recognizes and honours the Indigenous peoples of Brazil. The date was created by President Getúlio Vargas by a decree in 1943 and recalls the day (April 19) in 1940, in which several Indigenous leaderships of the Americas decided to attend the First Inter-American Indian Congress, held in Mexico. The observance name was changed from "Indian Day" (Portuguese: Dia do Índio) in 2022.

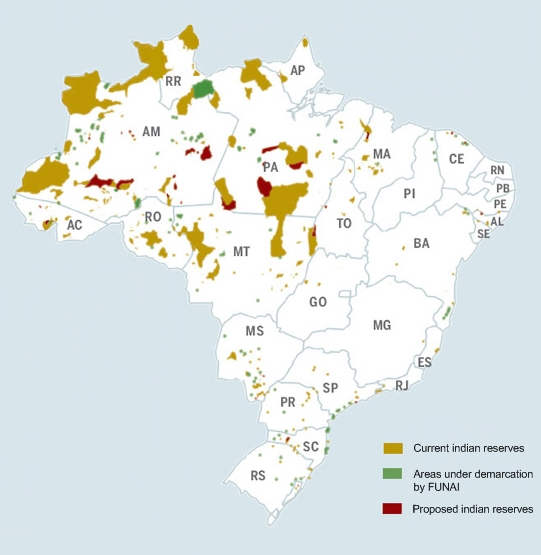
Map of Indigenous reserves in Brazil.

Nowadays most part of the cities does not celebrate the date, however it is very common for schoolchildren across Brazil to dress up like Natives and visit Museums to learn more about the first Brazilians. It is common to see celebrations in states with a relatively large Indigenous population, such as Mato Grosso, Mato Grosso do Sul, Pará, Goiás, Rondônia and Amazonas.

== Festivities ==
The National Indian Festival is held yearly in Bertioga, São Paulo to celebrate the Indigenous People's Day. It is considered the largest Indigenous cultural event in the world, which takes place on April 19.

The festival is seen as an opportunity to learn about Brazilian Indigenous peoples, since traveling to most tribal areas and reservations in Brazil is restricted and must be authorized by the national foundation FUNAI. It is also seen as an opportunity for Native Brazilians to perform celebrations, such as Indigenous rituals, body art, music, dance, food, crafts and sports.

== Similar days celebrating racial groups in Brazil ==
The "Day of the Caboclo" (Dia do Caboclo) is observed annually on June 24, in celebration of the contributions and identity of the original caboclos and their descendants. This date is an official public holiday in the State of Amazonas.

"Mixed Race Day" (Dia do Mestiço) is observed annually on June 27, three days after the Day of the Caboclo, in celebration of all mixed-race Brazilians, including the caboclos. The date is an official public holiday in three Brazilian states.

"Black Awareness Day" (Dia da Consciência Negra) is observed annually on November 20 as a day "to celebrate a regained awareness by the black community about their great worth and contribution to the country". The date is an official public holiday in five Brazilian states.
