= Camaipi do Vila Nova River =

Location
- Country: Brazil

Physical characteristics
- Source
  - location: Amapá state
- Mouth: Vila Nova River
  - coordinates: 0°9′N 51°35′W

The Camaipi do Vila Nova River is a river of Amapá state in Brazil. It is a tributary of the Vila Nova River which in turn is part of the Amazon River system.
