= Arapari River (Amapá) =

Location
- Country: Brazil

Physical characteristics
- Source
  - location: Amapá state
- Mouth
  - coordinates: 2°56′N 51°26′W

Arapari River is a river of Amapá state in north-eastern Brazil.

== See also ==
- List of rivers of Amapá
