= Jari River =

Jari River Jary River
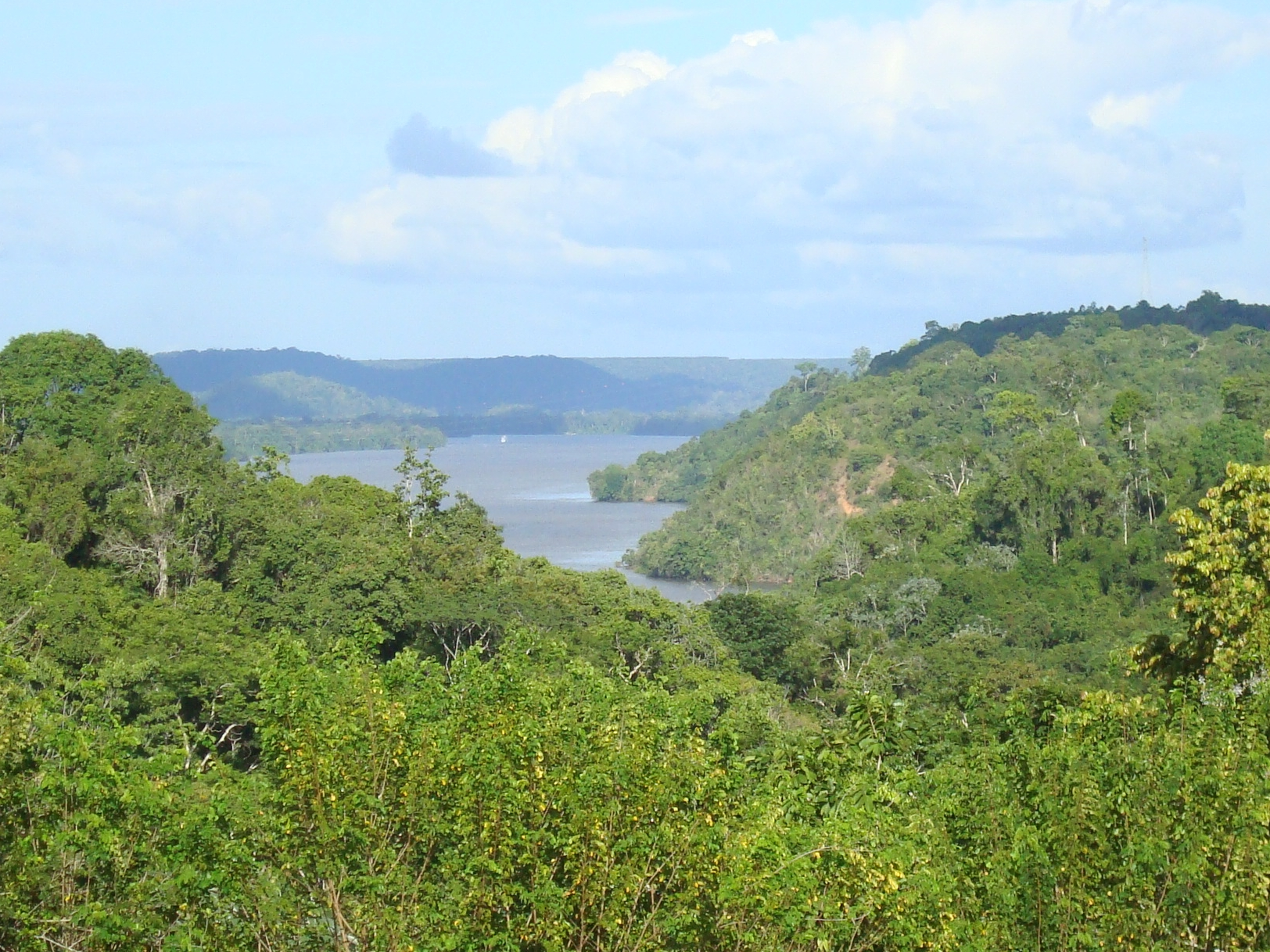
- Jari River near Monte Dourado

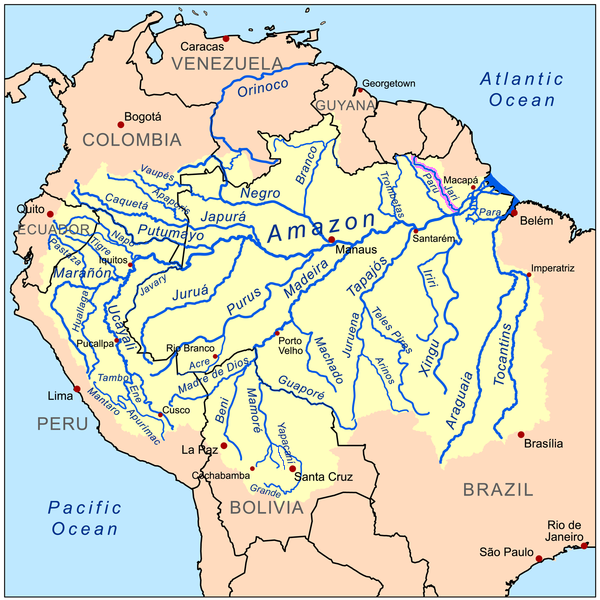
- Amazon Basin with Jari River in the northeast
- Native name: Rio Jari (Portuguese)

Location
- Country: Brazil
- State: Amapá, Pará

Physical characteristics
- Mouth: Amazon River
  - location: Brazil
  - coordinates: 1°9′S 51°54′W
- Length: 790 km (490 mi)
- Basin size: 60,000 km^{2} (23,000 sq mi)
- Discharge
  - average: 1,005–1,880 m^{3}/s (35,500–66,400 cu ft/s)

The Jari River, or Jary River (Portuguese: Rio Jari), is a northern tributary of the Amazon River on the border between the states of Pará and Amapá in northeastern Brazil. It is in the most downstream regions of the Amazon Basin and borders the Guiana Highlands and the Guianas to the northwest.

== Course ==
The river flows through the Uatuma-Trombetas moist forests ecoregion. The source of the Jari is in the south of the Tumuk Humak Mountains, and its mouth is at the Amazon River between the municipalities of Almeirim in Pará and Vitória do Jari in Amapá. Ilha Grande de Gurupá, the second-largest island of the Amazon River Delta, is opposite of the mouth of the Jari River. Part of the river's basin is in the Maicuru Biological Reserve.

The Jari River forms the western boundary of the Tumucumaque Mountains National Park. Below the park it forms the western boundary of the 806,184 hectares (1,992,120 acres) Rio Iratapuru Sustainable Development Reserve, created in 1997. For part of its course it runs through the Jari Ecological Station. Small numbers of people have settled along the river here, built houses, and cleared fields.

== Tributaries ==
- Iratapuru River
- Iratapina River
- Noucouru River
- Mapiri River
- Cuc River
- Culari River
- Curapi River
- Ximim-Ximim River
- Mapaoni River

== See also ==
- Jari project
