= Cuc River =

River in northern Brazil

Coordinates: 1°20′56″N 53°33′13″W

Cuc River (also known as the Kuu, Cuu, or Kouc) is a river in the Amapá state in Brazil.

It is a tributary of the Jari River, which is part of the Amazon River basin. The Wayampi people lived along the river until around 1970, when dysentery broke out after contact with outside people, after which the Wayampi people along the Cuc largely moved to French Guiana.
