= Noucouru River =

River in Amapá

Coordinates: 0°11′S 52°48′W

The Noucouru River is a river of Amapá state in Brazil. It is a tributary of the Jari River which is part of the Amazon River basin.
