= Macacoari River =

River in Amapá, Brazil

Coordinates: 0°17′58″N 50°42′15″W

Macacoari River is a river in Amapá, a state of Brazil. It is a tributary of the Amazon River.
