= Mapaoni River =

River in Amapá, Brazil

Coordinates: 1°39′56″N 54°10′49″W

Mapaoni River is a river of Amapá state in Brazil. It is a tributary of the Jari River, which is part of the Amazon River basin.
