= Guarijuba River =

River in Amapá, Brazil

Coordinates: 0°52′00″N 50°16′45″W

Guarijuba River is a river of Amapá state in Brazil. It is a tributary of the Amazon River.
