= Ximim-Ximim River =

Coordinates: 1°32′N 54°0′W

The Ximim-Ximim River is a river of Amapá state in Brazil. It is a tributary of the Jari River which is part of the Amazon River basin.
