= Cajari River (Amapá) =

- Location within Brazil
- Native name: Rio Cajari (Portuguese)

Location
- Country: Brazil

Physical characteristics
- Mouth
  - coordinates: 0.801229°S 51.707852°W

Basin features
- River system: Amazon River

The Cajari River (Portuguese: Rio Cajari) is a river of Amapá state in Brazil. It is a tributary of the Amazon River.

== Course ==
The Cajari River drains the center of the 501,771 hectares (1,239,900 acres) Rio Cajari Extractive Reserve, created in 1990. The upper and middle course of the Cajari form flooded terraces. In the lower course the river merges with other water bodies, which form meanders, lakes and channels.

== See also ==
- List of rivers of Amapá

== Sources ==
- RESEX do Rio Cajari (in Portuguese), ISA: Instituto Socioambiental
- "Rio do Cajari, Amazon - Cruise Masters", www.cruisemasters.co.za
- Unidade de Conservação: Reserva Extrativista Rio Cajari (in Portuguese), MMA: Ministério do Meio Ambiente
