= Serra do Navio =

Municipality in Amapá, Brazil

- Municipality
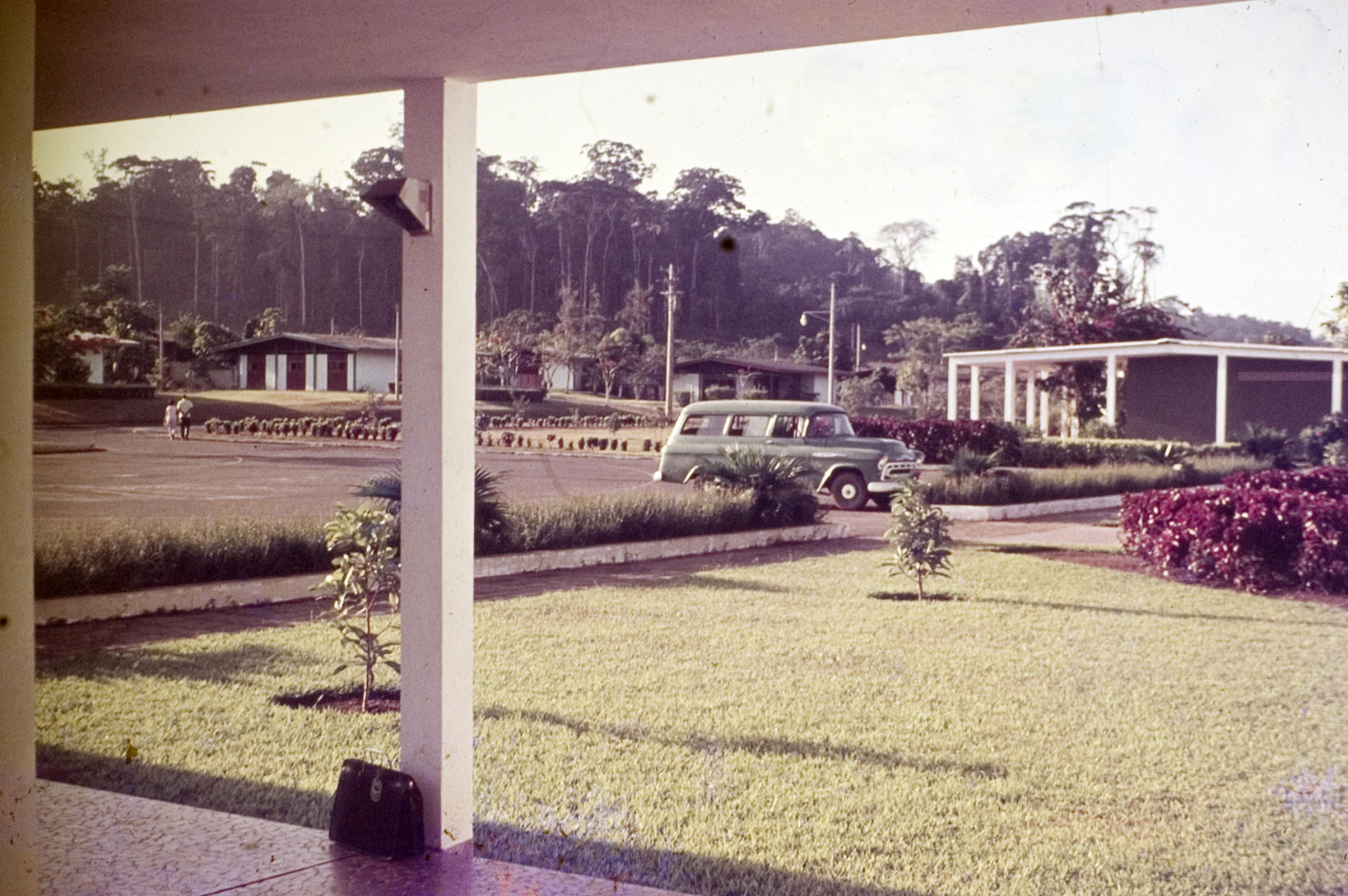
- Serra do Navio in 1965

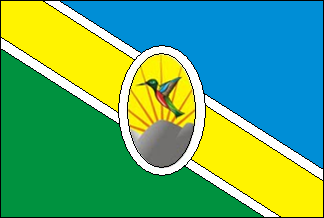
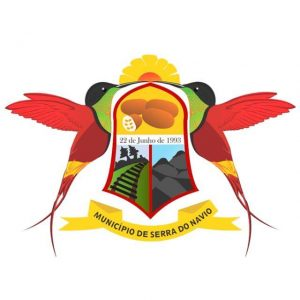
- Flag Coat of arms

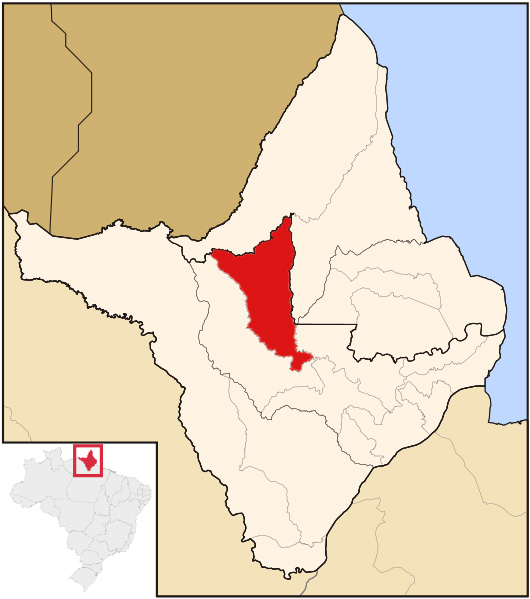
- Location in Amapá state

- Location in Brazil
- Coordinates: 0°53′45″N 52°0′7″W
- Country: Brazil
- Region: North
- State: Amapá

Government
  - Mayor: Elson Belo Lobato (AVANTE)

Area
  - Total: 7,713 km^{2} (2,978 sq mi)

Population (2020)
  - Total: 5,488
  - Density: 0.7115/km^{2} (1.843/sq mi)
- Time zone: UTC−3 (BRT)

Serra do Navio (Brazilian Portuguese: [ˈsɛʁɐ du naˈviw]; 'Mountain range of the Ship') is a municipality located in the center of the state of Amapá, Brazil. Its population is 5,488 (2020 est.) and its area is 7,713 km^{2}. In 1947, manganese was discovered in the area. Serra do Navio was built as a planned city to house the workers. On 22 June 1993, the capital of the municipality was changed from Água Branca do Amapari to Serra do Novio.

== History ==
In 1947, manganese was discovered in the area. ICOMI was given the concession to exploit the mines, however the scale of the operation was such, that Bethlehem Steel was given a 49% stake in 1950. The Amapá Railway, and two towns for the workers were constructed: Serra do Navio and Vila Amazonas near Santana where a harbour was built. Serra do Navio was built according to North-American standards and was considered a model town.

During the 1980s, the mine produced about 1,000,000 tons of ore, however Bethlehem Steel wanted to end the cooperation, because the deposits were being exhausted. The contract was originally set to end in 2003, however in 1996, Bethlehem Steel decided to end the contract.

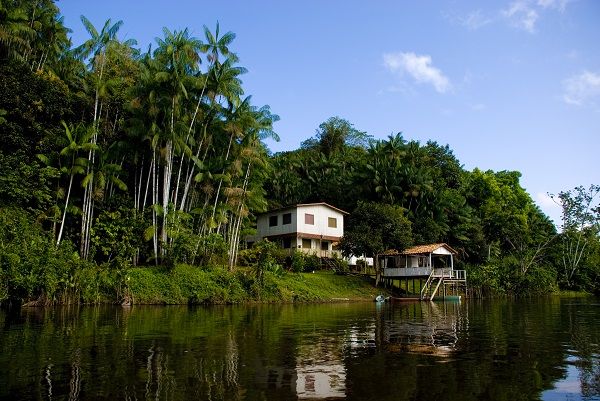

The closing of the main mine, led to a steep decrease in population, and the appearance of a ghost town. Smaller mines still operate in the region. Other economic activities include agriculture, and forestry.

Serra do Navio is located on the BR-210 highway. The municipality is subdivided in two districts: The town of Serra do Navio and Cachaço.

== Geography ==
=== Nature ===
The municipality contains 7.83% of the 2,369,400-hectare (5,855,000-acre) Amapá State Forest, a sustainable use conservation unit established in 2006.

=== Climate ===
Climate data for Serra do Navio (1981–2010)
Month	Jan	Feb	Mar	Apr	May	Jun	Jul	Aug	Sep	Oct	Nov	Dec	Year
Mean daily maximum °C (°F)	29.9 (85.8)	29.5 (85.1)	30.0 (86.0)	30.1 (86.2)	29.8 (85.6)	30.2 (86.4)	30.8 (87.4)	31.4 (88.5)	32.2 (90.0)	32.5 (90.5)	32.1 (89.8)	30.8 (87.4)	30.8 (87.4)
Mean daily minimum °C (°F)	21.3 (70.3)	21.7 (71.1)	21.6 (70.9)	21.6 (70.9)	21.8 (71.2)	21.4 (70.5)	21.1 (70.0)	21.4 (70.5)	21.6 (70.9)	21.6 (70.9)	21.4 (70.5)	21.7 (71.1)	21.5 (70.7)
Average precipitation mm (inches)	238.4 (9.39)	311.2 (12.25)	304.6 (11.99)	273.0 (10.75)	282.5 (11.12)	206.0 (8.11)	168.1 (6.62)	135.1 (5.32)	81.6 (3.21)	78.6 (3.09)	96.4 (3.80)	167.3 (6.59)	2,342.8 (92.24)
Average precipitation days (≥ 1.0 mm)	22	21	22	22	24	20	18	15	10	9	11	17	211
Mean monthly sunshine hours	113.2	92.7	96.2	97.7	121.3	144.0	185.9	211.7	221.0	234.7	194.3	151.7	1,864.4
Source: Instituto Nacional de Meteorologia

== Notable people ==
- Fernanda Takai (1975), singer and guitarist
