= Amapari River =

Coordinates: 0°43′22″N 51°32′29″W

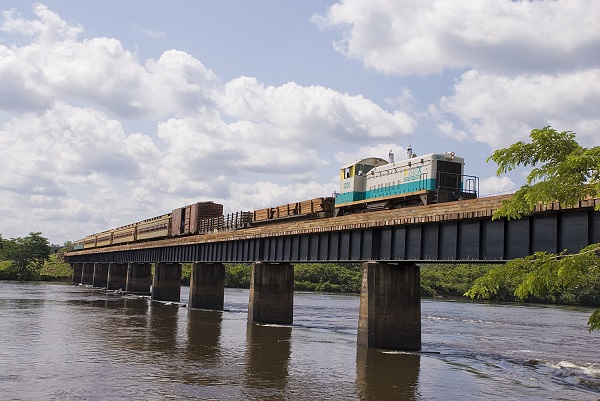
- Railway bridge

Location
- Country: Brazil

Physical characteristics
- Source
  - location: Amapá state

Amapari River is a river in Amapá state in north-eastern Brazil.

== See also ==
- List of rivers of Amapá
