= Cassiporé River =

- Mouth location in Brazil
- Native name: Rio Cassiporé (Portuguese)

Location
- Country: Brazil

Physical characteristics
- Source
  - location: Amapá state
- Mouth
  - coordinates: 3°54′03″N 51°09′22″W

The Cassiporé River is a river of Amapá state in north-eastern Brazil.

== Course ==
Cabo Cassiporé is a low promontory about 6 miles (9.7 km) east of the wide entrance to the river. The land from Cabo Orange to the north and Cabo Cassiporé is low and often flooded, with shallow water up to 12 miles (19 km) from the shore.

The Cassiporé river can be navigated by boats drawing under 2 metres (6 ft 7 in) as far as the village of Japa, 24 miles inland. The tidal range at the river mouth is less than 4 metres (13 ft). The Cassiporé River runs through the most northern part of the Amapá mangroves ecoregion along the bay where it flows into the Atlantic Ocean.

== See also ==
- List of rivers of Amapá
- Vila Velha do Cassiporé, a village and Quilombo settlement on the river.

== Sources ==
- Eisma, Doeke (21 January 1998), Intertidal Deposits: River Mouths, Tidal Flats, and Coastal Lagoons, CRC Press, ISBN 978-0-8493-8049-5
- Prostar (1 January 2004), Prostar Sailing Directions 2004 East Coast of South America Enroute, ProStar Publications, ISBN 978-1-57785-550-7
- Tognetti, Sylvia S.; Burdette, Christine, Northern South America: Northern Brazil (NT1402), WWF: World Wildlife Fund
