= Mazagão Velho =

District of Mazagão, Brazil

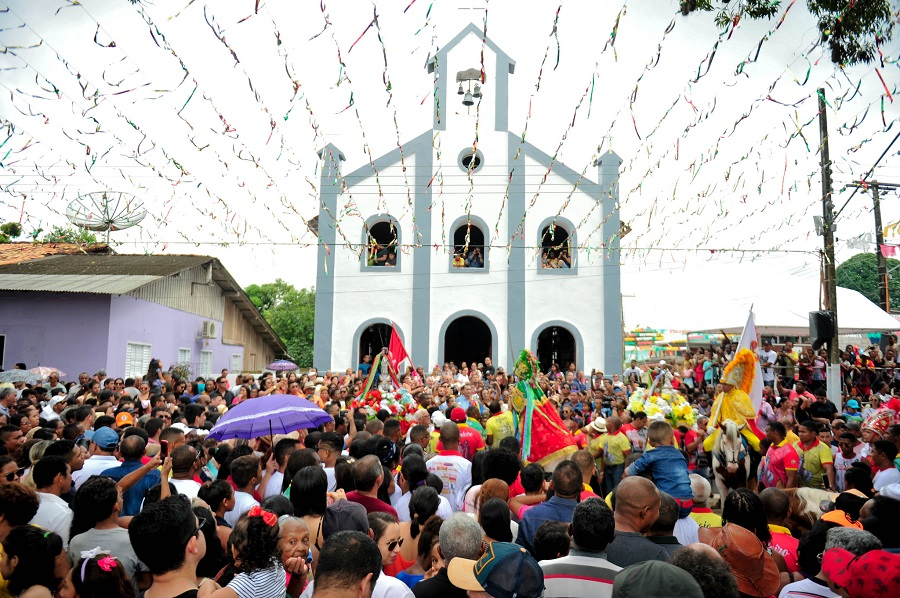
- Festival of São Tiago in Mazagão Velho

- Location in Brazil Mazagão Velho (Brazil)
- Coordinates: 0.2252°S 51.4325°W
- Country: Brazil
- Region: North
- State: Amapá
- Municipality: Mazagão
- Founded: 1773

Area
  - Total: 8,939 km^{2} (3,451 sq mi)

Population (2010)
  - Total: 7,598
  - Density: 0.8500/km^{2} (2.201/sq mi)
- Time zone: UTC-3

Mazagão Velho is a district and town in the Brazilian municipality of Mazagão, in the state of Amapá. The town was founded in 1773 by refugees from the former colony of Mazagão in Morocco. Mazagão Velho is known for the Festival of São Tiago which takes place between 16 and 28 July, and re-enacts the war between the Moors and the Christians.

== History ==
In 1769, the Portuguese colony of Mazagão in Morocco (nowadays called El Jadida) was abandoned. A total of 2,092 inhabitants of the colony were resettled, and 1,855 were sent to Belém, Brazil where they arrived in 1770. In 1773, the town of Mazagão Velho was founded in the interior of Amapá to house the refugees. By 1777, only 343 had remained in Belém. The economy of the town was centred around rice and cotton production using Amerindian slave labour.

The settlement did not prosper. The isolation in the middle of the Amazon rainforest, epidemics, and failed rice harvests led to a large part of the population leaving the town. In 1831, Mazagão Velho was removed from the list of villages. In 1841, Mazagão Velho became the capital of the municipality, however in 1915, the capital was moved to Nova do Anauerapucú which was renamed Mazagão Novo or simply Mazagão. Mazagão Velho became a district of Mazagão in 1960.

== Festival of São Tiago ==
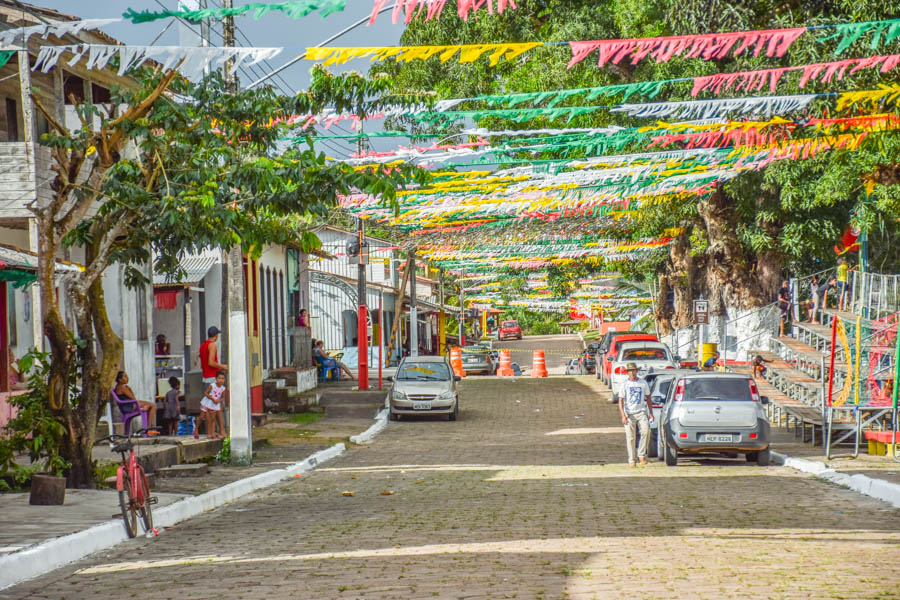

The Festival of São Tiago is held annually between 16 and 28 July, and re-enacts the war between the Moors and the Christians. The festival starts in church with a public mass, afterwards the party and re-enactment of the battle spreads throughout the village. The festival attracted a crowd of 50,000 people in 2017. In 2020, the festival was cancelled for the first time in history due to the COVID-19 pandemic, and a documentary about the festival was aired on television instead.

== Transport ==
Mazagão Velho can be reached by the AP-010 road from Santana and Macapá.

== Bibliography ==
- Cardeira da Silva, Maria; Silva Tavim, José Alberto (2013). Marrocos no Brasil: Mazagão (Velho) do Amapá em festa – a festa de São Tiago (PDF) (in Portuguese). Etnográfica Press.
