= Professora Marcivânia =

Brazilian politician (born 1973)

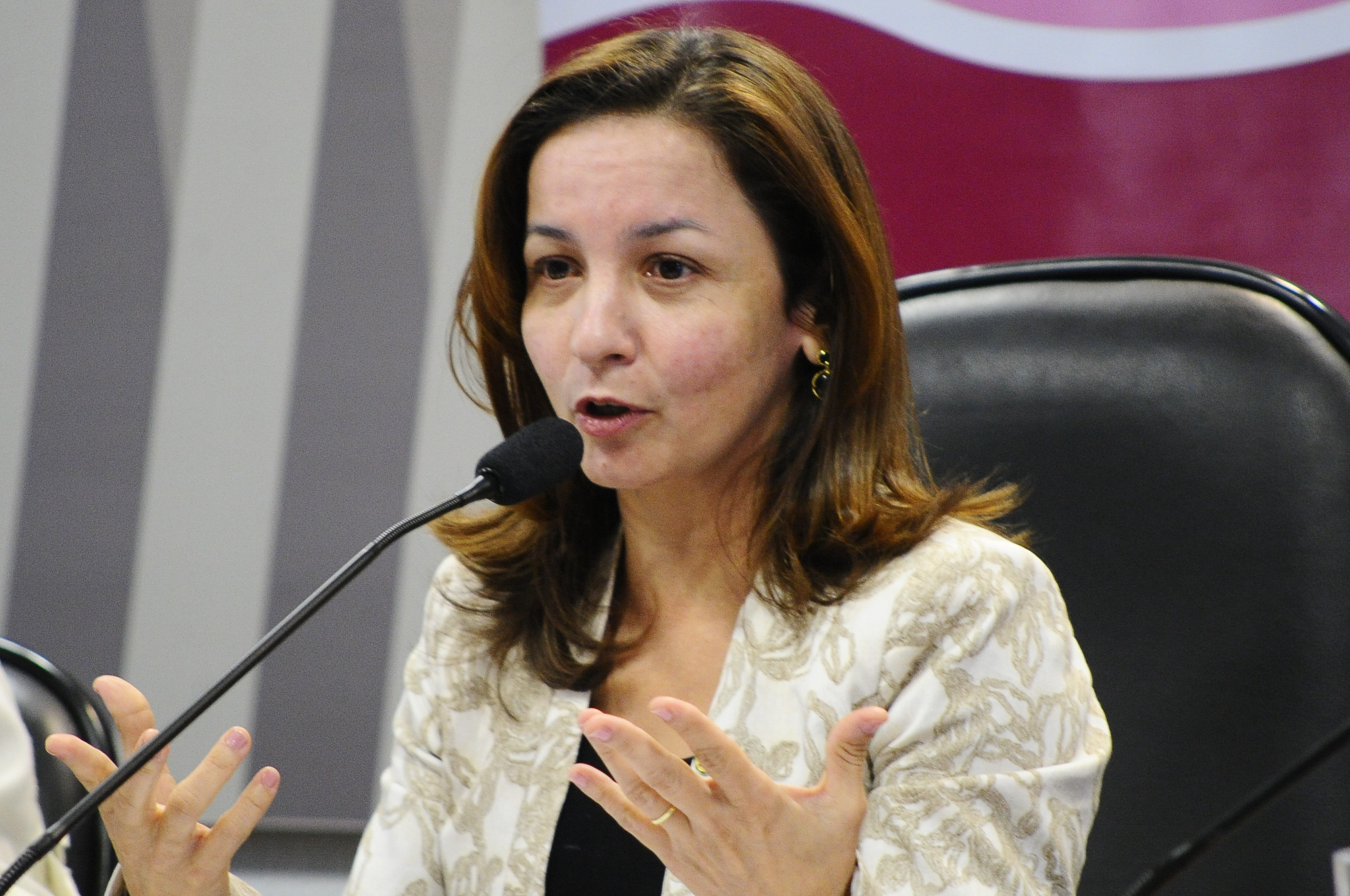
- Marcivânia in 2017

Member of the Chamber of Deputies
- Incumbent
- Assumed office 1 August 2025
- Constituency: Amapá
- In office 1 February 2015 – 1 February 2023
- Constituency: Amapá
- In office 1 February 2011 – 12 July 2011
- Constituency: Amapá

Personal details
- Born: Marcivânia do Socorrro da Rocha Flexa; 21 June 1973 (age 53) Santana, Amapá, Brazil
- Party: PCdoB (since 2016)
- Other political affiliations: PT (2003–2016)
- Education: Federal University of Amapá
- Profession: Teacher

Marcivânia do Socorro da Rocha Flexa (born 21 June 1973), better known as Professora Marcivânia, is a Brazilian politician. She has been a member of the Chamber of Deputies since 2025, having previously served from February to July 2011 and from 2015 to 2023. In 2009, she served as secretary social action of Santana.
