= Dorinaldo Malafaia =

Brazilian politician (born 1976)

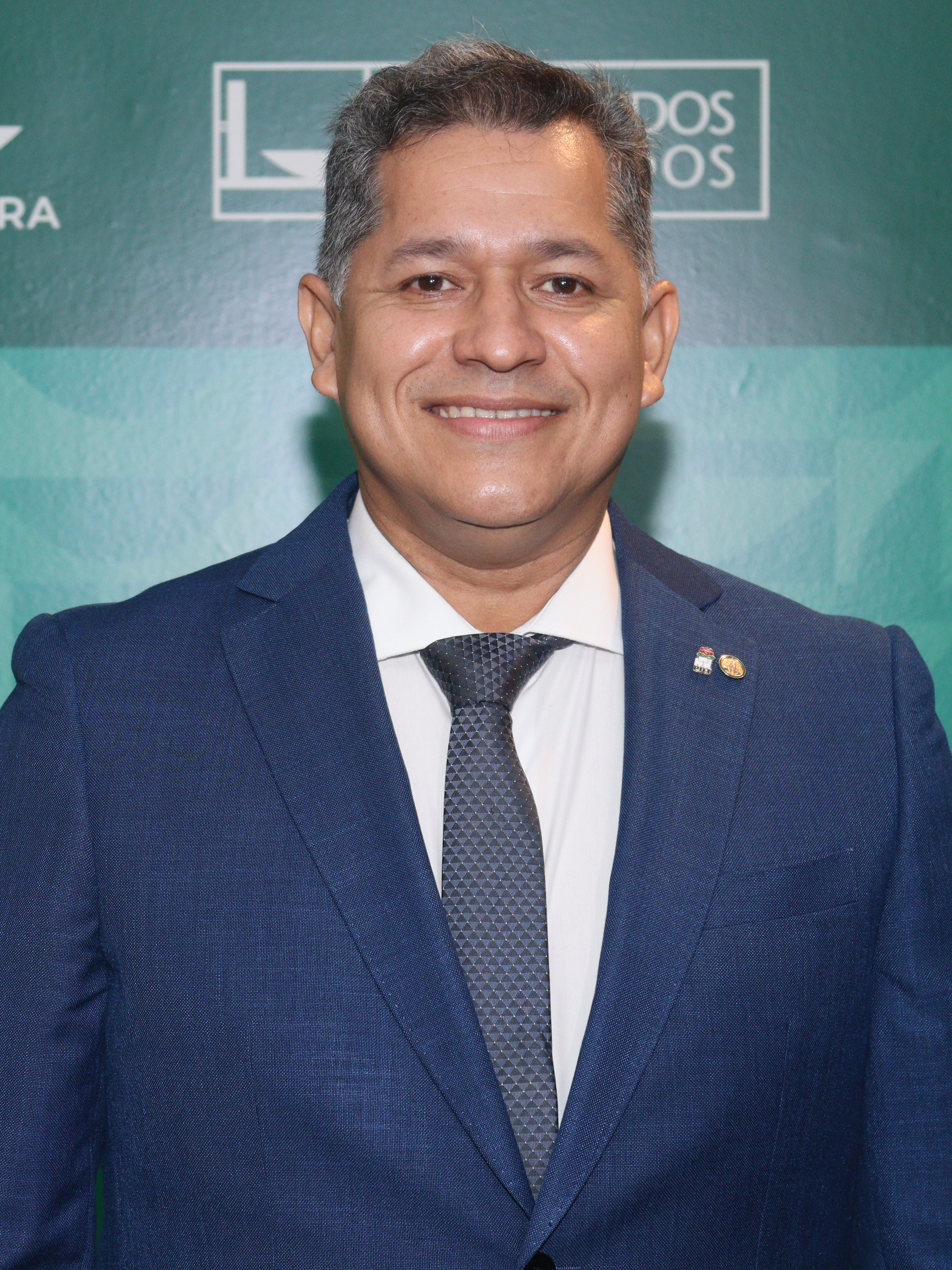
- Malafaia in 2023

Member of the Chamber of Deputies
- Incumbent
- Assumed office 1 February 2023
- Constituency: Amapá

Personal details
- Born: Dorinaldo Barbosa Malafaia; 23 February 1976 (age 50) Macapá, Amapá, Brazil
- Party: PDT (since 2021)
- Other political affiliations: PT (2004–2006); PSOL (2006–2021)
- Education: Federal University of Amapá
- Profession: Teacher, nurse

Dorinaldo Barbosa Malafaia (born 23 February 1976) is a Brazilian politician serving as a member of the Chamber of Deputies since 2023. He has served as deputy government leader since 2023.
