= Carvão =

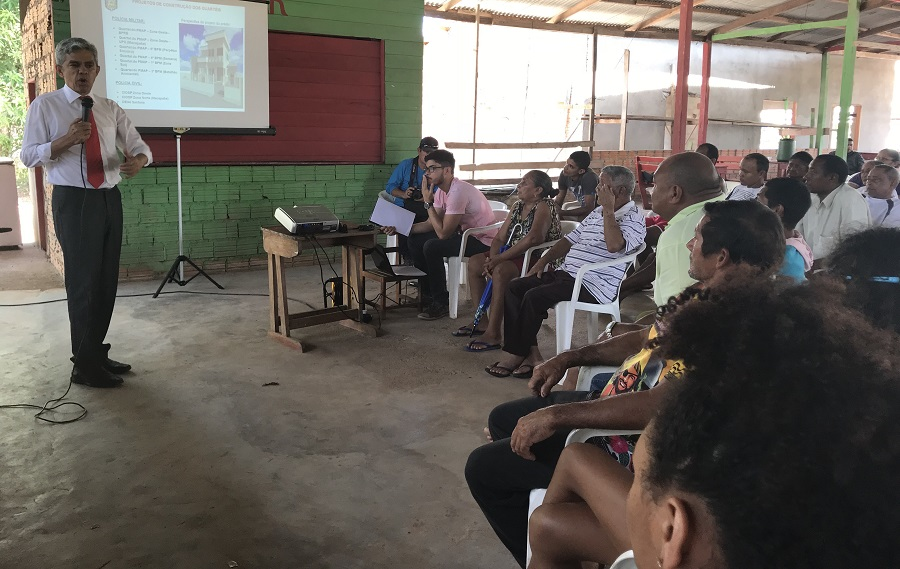
- Public meeting in Carvão

- Location in Brazil Carvão (Brazil)
- Coordinates: 0.1821°S 51.3571°W
- Country: Brazil
- Region: North
- State: Amapá
- Municipality: Mazagão
- Founded: 1914

Population (2010)
  - Total: 1,097
- Time zone: UTC−3 (BRT)

Carvão is a district in the Brazilian municipality of Mazagão, in the state of Amapá. It is located along the Mutuacá River.

== Overview ==
Carvão was founded in 1914 as a coal miners community. It developed into an agricultural community, however the public sector and wage labour have become the backbone of the economy in the 21st century, and agriculture has become limited to subsistence farming.

The village is connected to the AP-010 road which provides access to Santana and Macapá. The village has a school, and has received access to clean drinking water. In 1995, Carvão became a district of Mazagão.
