= Fazendinha =

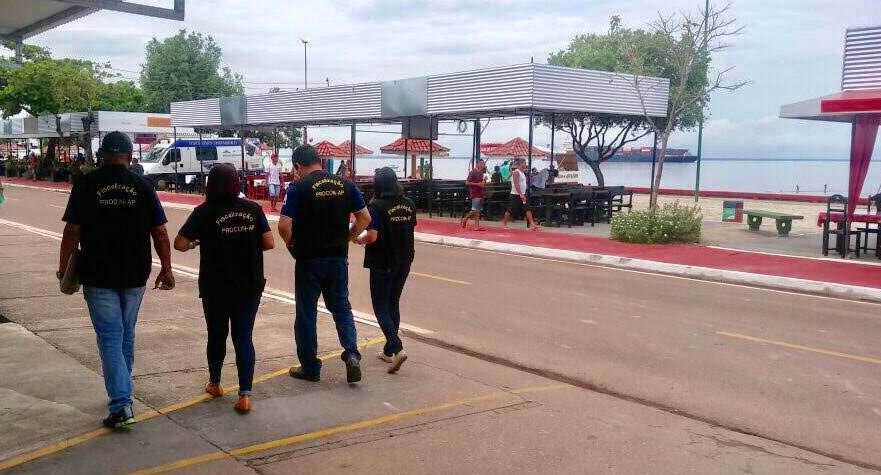

- Location in Brazil Fazendinha (Brazil)
- Coordinates: 0.0441°S 51.1171°W
- Country: Brazil
- Region: North
- State: Amapá
- Municipality: Macapá

Population (2010)
  - Total: 9,226
- Time zone: UTC−3 (BRT)

Fazendinha is a district in the Brazilian municipality of Macapá in the state of Amapá. It is the main beach for the capital Macapá.

== Overview ==
Fazendinha is a suburb located between Macapá and Santana on the AP-010 road. The town is home to the main beach for the capital, and is known for its carnival celebration.

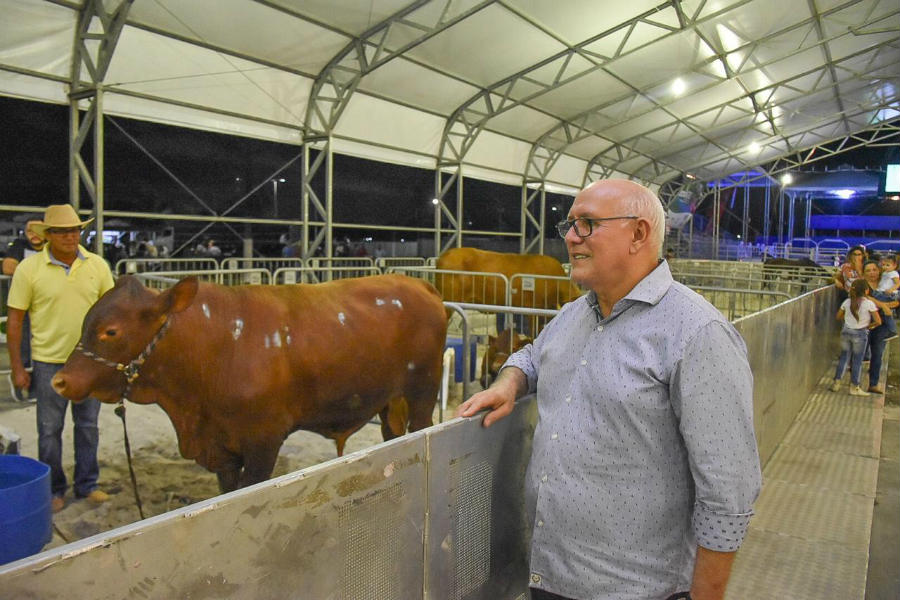

The Fazendinha Exhibition Park is located in the town. It is mainly used as a livestock market. ExpoBúfalo is an annual livestock show of buffalos, and the highlight of the show is a rodeo.

In 1988, Fazendinha became a district of Macapá.

== Nature ==
The Fazendinha Environmental Protection Area, the oldest protected area of Amapá, is located in the district. The protected area was created in 1974, and received its current extend in 2004. The protected area contains floodplain forests, and is home to agoutis, sloths, giant anteaters, and giant armadillos.
