= André Abdon =

Brazilian politician (born 1970)

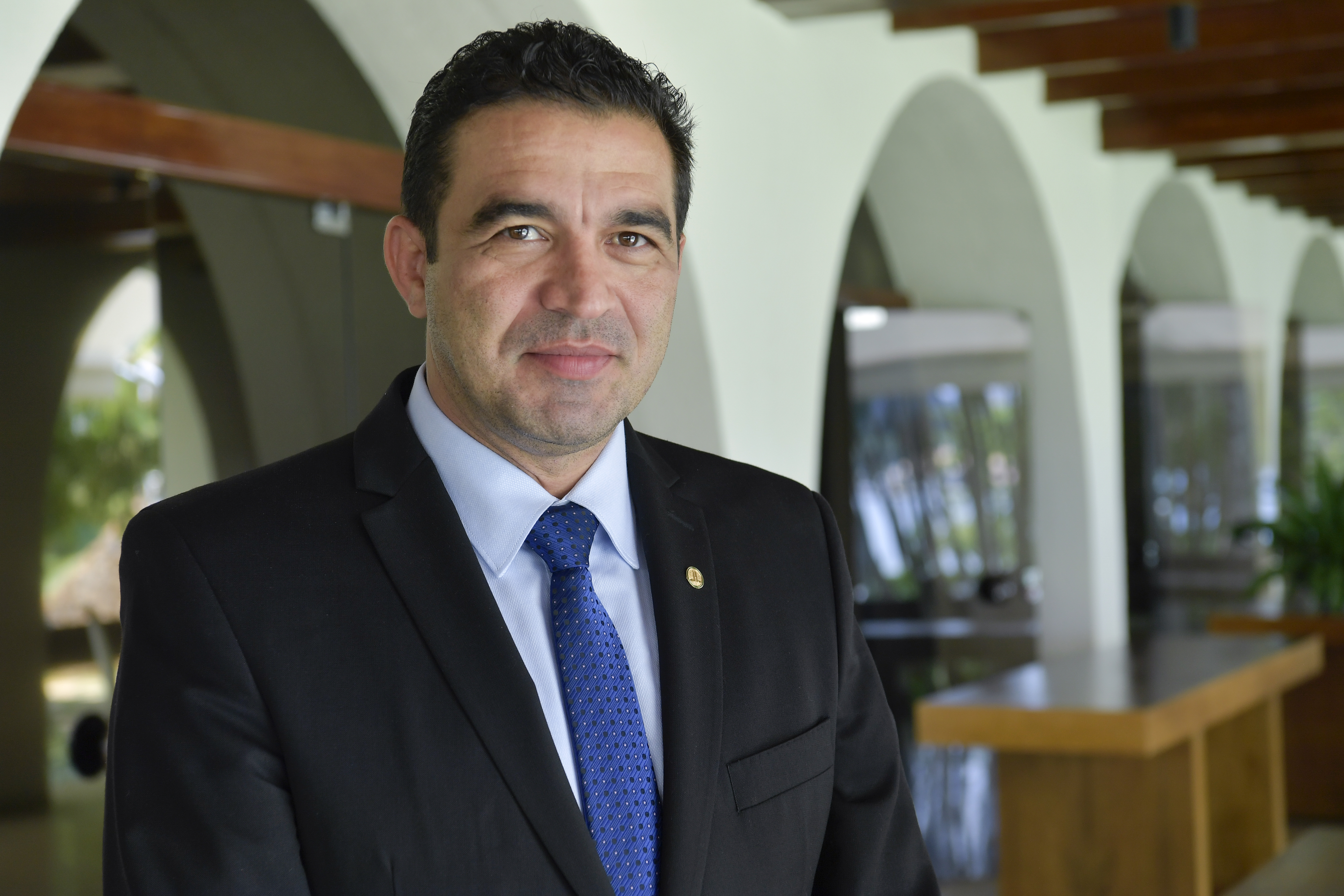
- Abdon in 2019

Member of the Chamber of Deputies
- Incumbent
- Assumed office 1 August 2025
- Preceded by: Augusto Puppio
- Constituency: Amapá
- In office 1 February 2015 – 31 January 2023
- Constituency: Amapá

Personal details
- Born: 10 November 1970 (age 55)
- Party: Progressistas (since 2016)

André dos Santos Abdon (born 10 November 1970) is a Brazilian politician. He has been a member of the Chamber of Deputies since 2025, having previously served from 2015 to 2023. In 1998, he served as secretary of environment of Macapá.
