= Fortaleza de São José de Macapá =

- Macapá, Amapá in Brazil
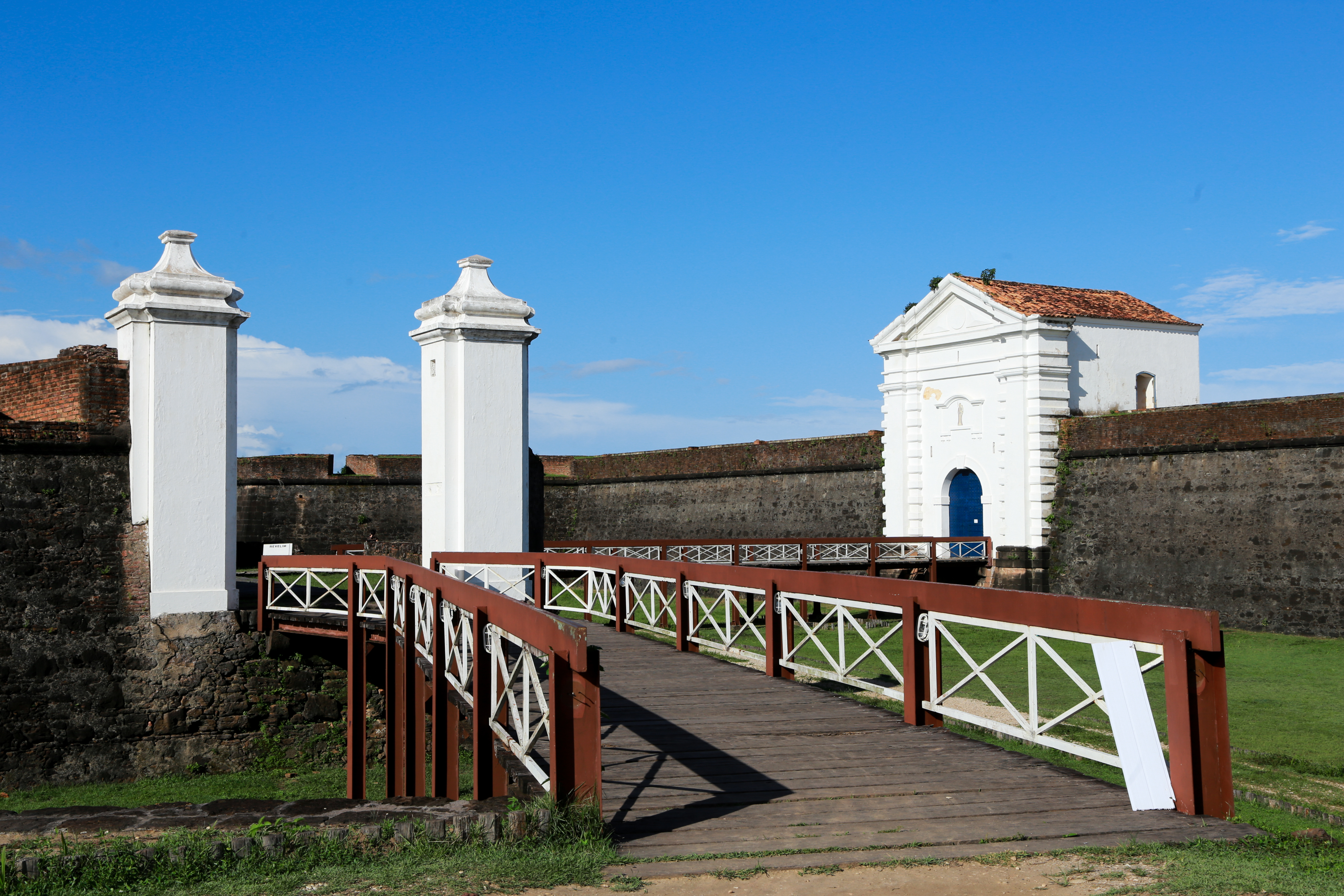

Site information
- Type: Fort
- Open to the public: Yes
- Condition: Good

Location
- Location of Fortaleza de São José in Brazil Fortaleza de São José (Amapá)
- Coordinates: 0.031058°N 51.049133°W

National Historic Heritage of Brazil
- Designated: 1950
- Reference no.: 269

Fortaleza de São José de Macapá is a fort located in Macapá, Amapá in Brazil.

== See also ==
- Military history of Brazil
- Central Market of Macapá
