= Astrothelium lineatum =

Scientific classification
- Kingdom: Fungi
- Division: Ascomycota
- Class: Dothideomycetes
- Order: Trypetheliales
- Family: Trypetheliaceae
- Genus: Astrothelium
- Species: A. lineatum

Binomial name
- Astrothelium lineatum Aptroot & M.Cáceres (2016)
- Holotype: Maracá Extractive Reserve, Brazil

Species of lichen-forming fungus

Astrothelium lineatum is a species of corticolous (bark-dwelling) crustose lichen in the family Trypetheliaceae. This lichen was discovered in the Brazilian Amazon, where it grows on tree bark in savanna areas. It is distinguished by its bright orange coloring and the linear patterns formed by its ascospore-producing structures.

== Taxonomy ==
Astrothelium lineatum was described as new to science in 2016 by André Aptroot and Marcela da Silva Cáceres from material collected in Amapá, northern Brazil. The holotype was gathered on tree bark in savanna vegetation near the Maracá Extractive Reserve (municipality of Mazagão, Amapá). The specific epithet refers to the species' often linear pseudostromata.

In their notes, the authors indicated that it keys near Astrothelium condoricum, but that species lacks the red pigmentation in the pseudostroma and has shorter, wider spores without a gelatinous sheath.

== Description ==
The thallus of A. lineatum is dull ochraceous and entirely suffused with bright orange pigment. It lacks a distinct prothallus and appears to induce gall-like swelling of the host bark. Ascomata (fruiting structures) are roughly spherical (globose) to pear-shaped (pyriform), 0.5–0.8 mm in diameter, and occur deeply immersed in and beneath the pseudostromata in groups of 3–15. Pseudostromata are only weakly differentiated from the thallus, ellipsoid to elongated or branched (sometimes forming a reticulum), and orange on the surface but unpigmented internally. The ostioles are apical, pale brown, and encircled by a roughly 0.1 mm whitish ring. The hamathecium is not inspersed. Asci contain eight ascospores; the spores are hyaline, regularly muriform, long-ellipsoid, 45–55 × 11–13 μm, without a distinctly thickened median septum, and are surrounded by a 10–13 μm-wide gelatinous sheath. Pycnidia were not observed to occur in this species.

In terms of spot test reactions, the thallus and pseudostroma are UV+ (pink) and K+ (blood red); thin-layer chromatography detected an anthraquinone, probably parietin.

== Habitat and distribution ==
The species grows on tree bark in savanna vegetation and is known to occur only in Amapá, Brazil.

== See also ==
- List of lichens of Brazil
