= Central Market of Macapá =

Brazilian public market

- Mercado Central de Macapá
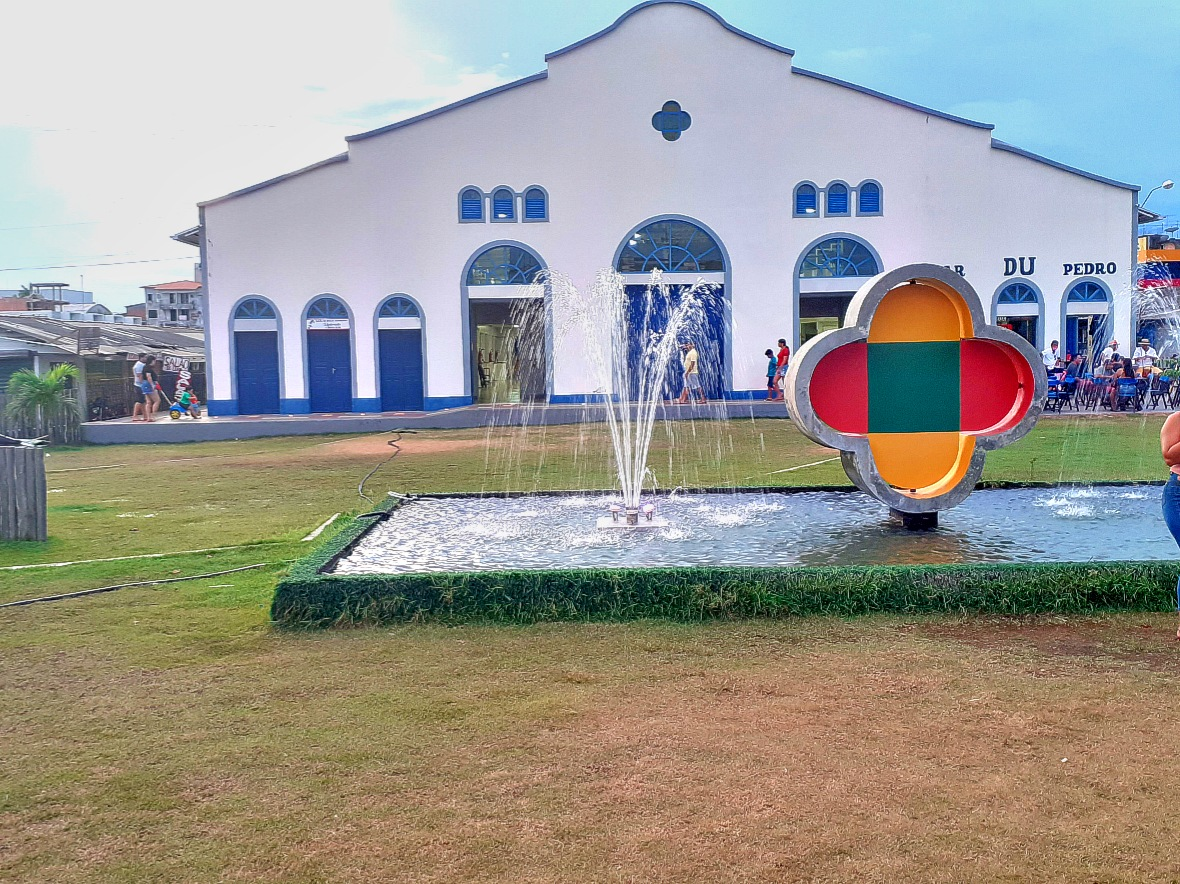
- View of the Central Market in 2021.
- Interactive map of the Central Market of Macapá area

General information
- Architectural style: Colonial Style
- Location: Macapá, Amapá; Brazil
- Coordinates: 0°01′51″N 51°3′13″W
- Construction started: 1952
- Completed: 1953
- Owner: City Hall of Macapá

The Central Market of Macapá (Portuguese: Mercado Central de Macapá) is a public market in the city of Macapá that was considered the shopping stronghold of the families of Amapá in the 1950s. Nowadays, the place still preserves some services such as the sales of vegetables and shoe repairs, along with snack bars, fishmongers, and butchers.

The inauguration took place on September 13, 1953, an emblematic date since this was the anniversary of the creation of the Federal Territory of Amapá. The building is located in a place of historical importance in the city, right in front of the Fortress of São José de Macapá.

Governor Janary Nunes and Mayor Claudomiro de Moraes inaugurated the Central Market with the proposal of being a space for the commercialization of the produce that was landed on the Eliezer Levy Pier, which, at the time, was the main landing site in Macapá. Japanese families came to the city to work in the market, along with the locals.

Currently, the building has 63 stalls, with activities focused on the food segment. The market still preserves some commercial activities and invests in programs that rescue the culture of Amapá and northern Brazil.

== History ==
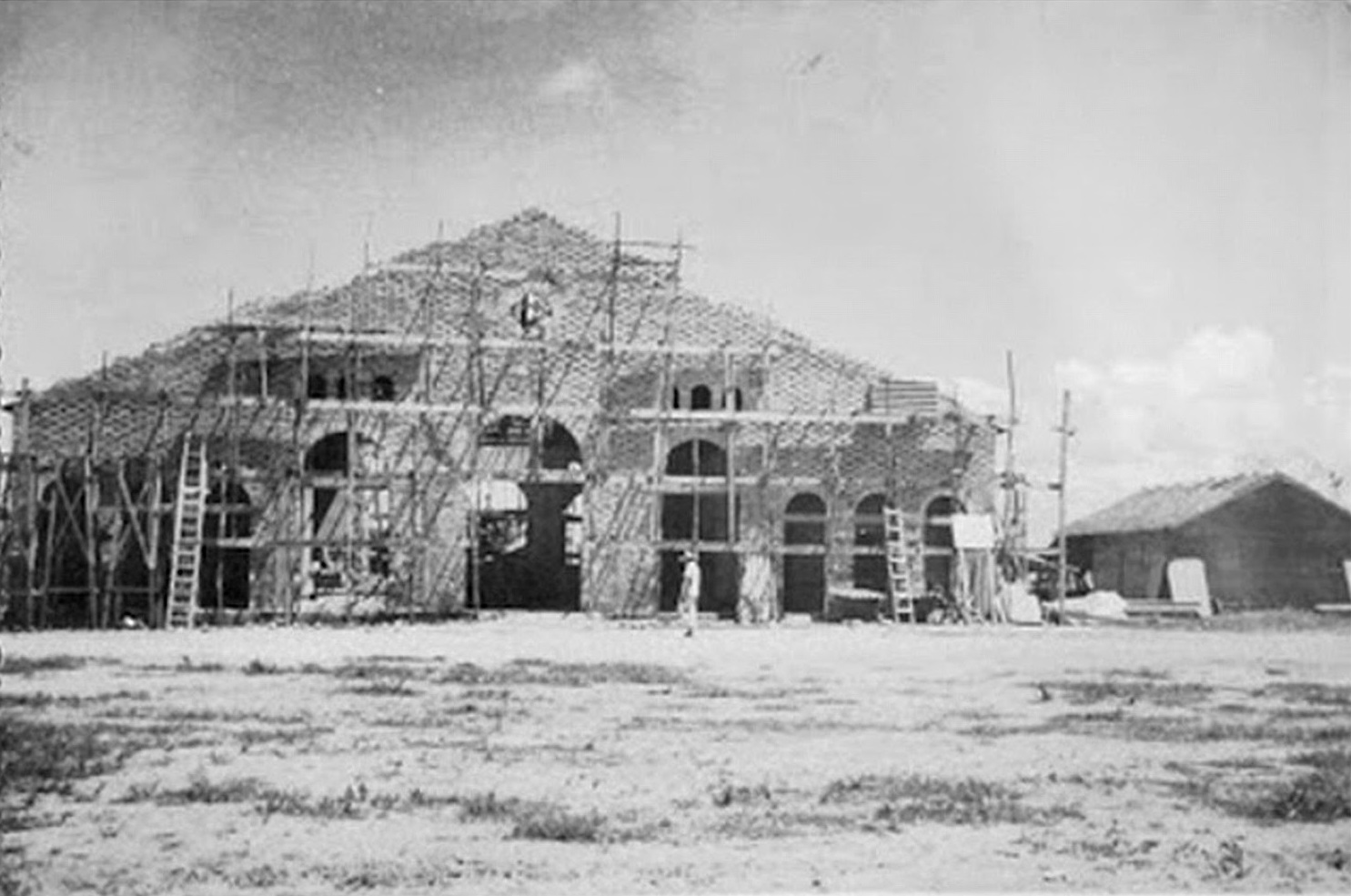
Construction of the market in 1952.

=== Creation and inauguration of the market (1952–1953) ===
The Central Market was built during Janary Gentil Nunes' government, in 1952, designed by master Júlio, and inaugurated in 1953, ten years after the Territory's creation. At that time, the commercial area of Macapá was restricted to the Fortress Dock and Cândido Mendes Street. It is located in the only protected part of the city of Macapá, which encompasses the area around the Fortress of São José. The building was built facing Cândido Mendes Street, the main road of local commerce, in front of Theodoro Mendes Square. The name of the square pays homage to the former mayor of Macapá, who was in power for 20 years (1896-1916).

=== Early days ===
Before the market was built, there was already a bus stop on the site known as the Clip Bar, which served as a shelter for passengers using the city's circular buses..

In 1953, Japanese immigration to the state of Amapá began when 29 families arrived directly from Japan on a ship. They were attracted by the rubber extraction industry but ultimately decided to settle and engage in agricultural activities, contributing to the development of the Central Market.

=== Bar Du Pedro ===
Outside, on Antonio Coelho de Carvalho Avenue, stands Bar Du Pedro, the oldest establishment in operation. The bar was inaugurated together with the market and belonged to a merchant named Pedro, originally from Rio Grande do Norte, who lived in Amapá in the 1950s. When he died in the 1990s, his son Luiz Gonzaga took over the family business.

== Restoration and revitalization ==
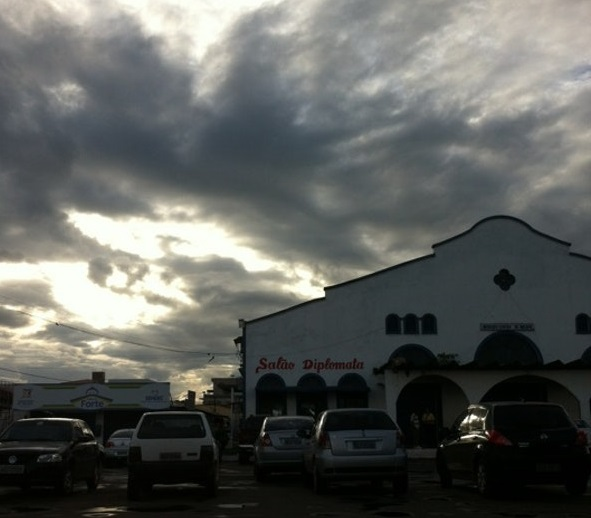
View of the Central Market at sunset.

=== Resources and Deadline ===
In November 2015, the renovation work began. The Municipal Department of Works (Semob) executed the first part of the services within the estimated period, guaranteeing completion by March 2016, but it was halted due to a lack of federal funds, since the economic situation at the time in the country ended up preventing the capture of new resources.

On May 1, 2018, the construction work was resumed. The cost is approximately R$2.5 million, with resources from the federal program Calha Norte. The market was reopened on January 16, 2020, with 63 stalls.

=== Renovation ===
The restoration project includes the services of expansion, revitalization, and removal of the current roof to build a new metallic and acoustic structure in the building. After the end of the works, the place will have a mezzanine, a stage for presentations, an administration room, a totally new electrical part, reformed boxes, a thermo-acoustic roof, painting, reorganized spaces, reformed bathrooms, with a special one with accessibility for people with disabilities.

== Commerce ==
In the internal part, there are 16 boxes for the commercialization of green and brown meat, salted meat and vegetables in general. The other 20 indoor stalls are for the sale of foodstuffs, from fruit and vegetables, fishing and other products. The place is very busy with restaurants, snack bars, cultural attractions, and handicraft sales on the outskirts of the market.
