= Ilha de Santana =

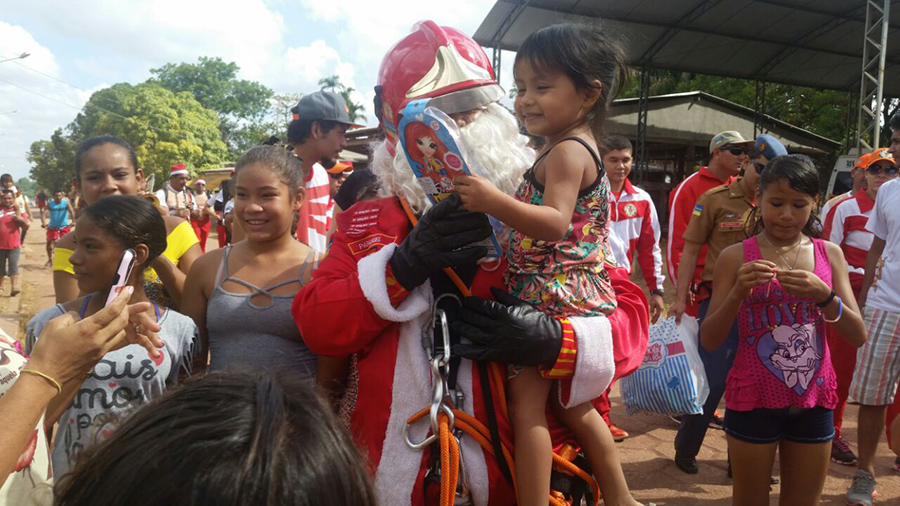
- Christmas party in Ilha de Santana (2016)

- Location in Brazil Ilha de Santana (Brazil)
- Coordinates: 0.0740°S 51.1736°W
- Country: Brazil
- Region: North
- State: Amapá
- Municipality: Santana

Population (2010)
  - Total: 2,689
- Time zone: UTC-3

Ilha de Santana is an island and district in the Brazilian municipality of Santana, in the state of Amapá. It is located in the Amazon River across the city of Santana. The island measures 2,005 hectares (4,950 acres).

== Overview ==
The island was settled by Portuguese and mestizos who were joined by the Tucuju Amerindians of Francisco Portilho de Melo's expedition. In 1753, Ilha de Santana became an official settlement by the order of Francisco Xavier de Mendonça Furtado, and dedicated to Saint Anne. In 1940, a German U-boat was spotted near the island. Ilha de Santana became a district of Santana in 1987. In 2018, the islanders complained of neglect of the infrastructure on the island by the municipality.

The island consists of 1,008 hectares (2,490 acres) of highlands. The remainder are floodplains of a more recent history. Ilha de Santana can be reached by ferry from Santana.
