= Rio Curiaú Environmental Protection Area =

Protected area in Amapá, Brazil

- Área de Proteção Ambiental do Rio Curiaú
- IUCN category V (protected landscape/seascape)
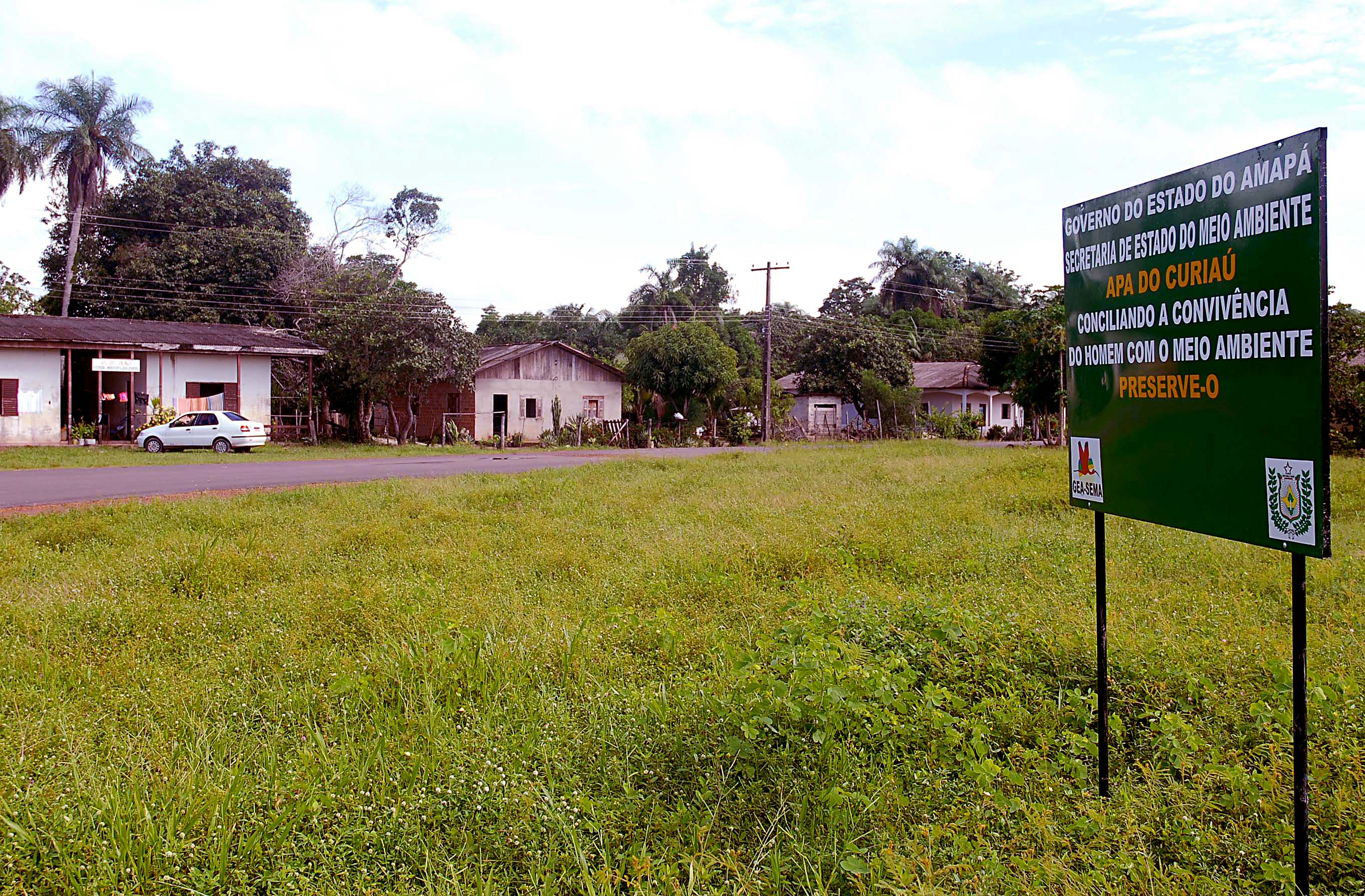
- The village of Curiaú

- Location within Amapá Location within Brazil
- Nearest city: Macapá, Amapá
- Coordinates: 0°09′29″N 51°02′00″W
- Area: 21,676 hectares (53,560 acres)
- Designation: Environmental protection area
- Created: 28 September 1992

The Rio Curiaú Environmental Protection Area (Portuguese: Área de Proteção Ambiental do Rio Curiaú) is an environmental protection area in the state of Amapá, Brazil. It attempts to protect the environment of a region of forest and flooded fields close to the state capital, Macapá, and also to preserve the values and culture of the traditional population, which is of African descent. It is threatened by urban expansion.

== Location ==
The Rio Curiaú (Note: The name of Rio Curiaú, or Curiaú River, comes from the words cria (create) and mú (cattle), forming Criamú, which evolved into Curiaú.) Environmental Protection Area (APA) is in the municipality of Macapá, Amapá, about 5 kilometres (3.1 mi) from the city center, and has an area of 21,676 hectares (53,560 acres). The Curiaú River, which gives its name to the APA, rises in the APA and flows southeast into the Amazon. The EAP-070 highway from Macapá runs through the APA from south to north. The APA is bounded to the east by the Amazon River, to the north by the Pescada stream and the road linking the EAP-070 highway to BR-210, to the west by the Amapá railroad, and to the south by an E-W line that divides it from the urban area of Macapá to the south.

== History ==
One account says the settlement was founded about three centuries ago by a settler of African origin, Sr. Miranda, his wife and seven slaves, all brothers, who decided this would be a good place to raise cattle. Another says the Vila do Curiaú and other communities in the region were settled in the 18th century by slaves who revolted and fled from construction of the fortress of São José de Macapá. There may be truth in both stories, since escaped slaves may have found refuge with the original settlers. The traditional population of quilombolas is of African descent.

The APA was created by Amapá state decree 1417 of 28 September 1992, and by decree 1418 the Vila do Curiaú was recognized as Cultural Heritage of Amapá due to the popular culture of the African Brazilians in the communities. The goal was to prevent damage to the ecosystems of the Curiaú River basin due to the unplanned urban expansion of Macapá, and to preserve the social values and culture of the quilombo residents. On 15 September 1998 law 0431 repealed decree 1417 and recreated the Rio Curiaú APA with changed boundaries, reducing its area by about 1,324 hectares (3,270 acres). The management board of the APA was created by state decree 3099 in 2001, and includes representatives of public authorities and of organized civil society. The APA was made part of the Amapá Biodiversity Corridor, created in 2003.

== Environment ==
The Köppen climate classification is Af (humid tropical). Average annual temperatures are around 27 °C (81 °F) and average annual rainfall about 2,500 millimetres (98 in). Relative humidity averages 85%. Vegetation includes várzea and cerrado forests and fields. The Curiaú River basin is about 584.47 square kilometres (225.67 sq mi) of which about 40% is in the APA. The river is influenced by tides and by storms. It runs through the center of the APA in the region of flooded fields, which are completely flooded for much of the year.

There are three soil types, oxisol, gleysol and alluvial soil. Oxisols, mostly associated with the cerrado ecosystem, cover about 44% of the APA in flat or gently rolling terrain. They are poorly drained, high in clay and low in fertility. The gleysols are found in the várzea forest and flooded fields, covering 43% of the APA. They have poor drainage but constantly receive fresh sediments during periods of flooding, and are suitable for growing rice and natural pastures. Alluvial soils cover 6% of the APA in the gallery forest environment, and have good fertility.

== Economy ==
The Vila do Curiaú is considered a Historical and Ecological Site. The main economic activities are subsistence agriculture and plant and animal extraction. As of 1999 there were about 1,500 people in five communities, Curiaú de Dentro, Curiaú de Fora, Casa Grande, Curralinho and Mocambo. Rapid population growth in Macapá is causing the urban area to extend into the APA. The communities are responding to economic and cultural pressures by abandoning their traditional occupations and knowledge in favor of other ways of making a living.

== Sources ==
- "Amapá, Área de Proteção Ambiental de Curiaú", Portal Amazônia (in Portuguese), Grupo Amazônia Cabo, 25 January 2005
- Corredor de Biodiversidade do Amapá Biodiversity Corridor (PDF) (in Portuguese), Belém: CI-Brasil, Governo do Amapá, Fundação Lee & Gund, 2007, archived from the original (PDF) on 2019-04-14
- Lima e Silva, Raullyan Borja; Freitas, João da Luz; Moreira dos Santos, João Ubiratan; Picanço Souto, Raimundo Nonato (2013), "Caracterização agroecológica e socioeconômica dos moradores da comunidade quilombola do Curiaú" (PDF), Biota Amazônia (in Portuguese), 3 (3), Macapá, ISSN 2179-5746
- Novos conselheiros da Area de Protecao Ambiental do Rio Curiau sao empossados (in Portuguese), SEMA: Secretaria de Estado de Meio Ambiente (AP), 9 December 2013
