= Pirativa =

District in Santana, Amapá, Brazil

- Location in Brazil Pirativa (Brazil)
- Coordinates: 0.0596°N 51.2995°W
- Country: Brazil
- Region: North
- State: Amapá
- Municipality: Santana

Population (2010)
  - Total: 591
- Time zone: UTC-3

Pirativa is a district in the Brazilian municipality of Santana, in the state of Amapá. It is located along the Pirativa River. São Raimundo do Pirativa, a village in the district, has been recognized as a quilombo, a settlement by escaped slaves.

== Overview ==
Pirativa is an agricultural area. The main products are cassava and pineapples. The district is known for the annual Cassava Festival. Pirativa has a school, but no clinic. The district can only be accessed by boat. In 2001, Pirativa became a district of Santana.

== São Raimundo do Pirativa ==
São Raimundo do Pirativa was recognised as a quilombo in 2013, and has its own territory of 23.4 hectares (58 acres) similar to the indigenous territories. The neighbouring village of Alto do Pirativa has also applied for recognition, but as of 2021, it has not been certified.

== Malaria trial ==
In 2003, a clinical trial by the University of Florida was launched in São Raimundo do Pirativa. 10 healthy volunteers were subjected to 100 mosquito bites in a malaria trial, and were paid R$ 108 for participation. Not only did all cases contract malaria, the number of malaria cases in the region went up from four to 30 cases. The University of Florida has denied that people caught malaria as a result of the project, and claimed that the allegations were unproven. The trial has been suspended, and an investigation into the ethics of the trial was launched.
