= Carapanantuba =

District of Macapá, Brazil

- Municipal district
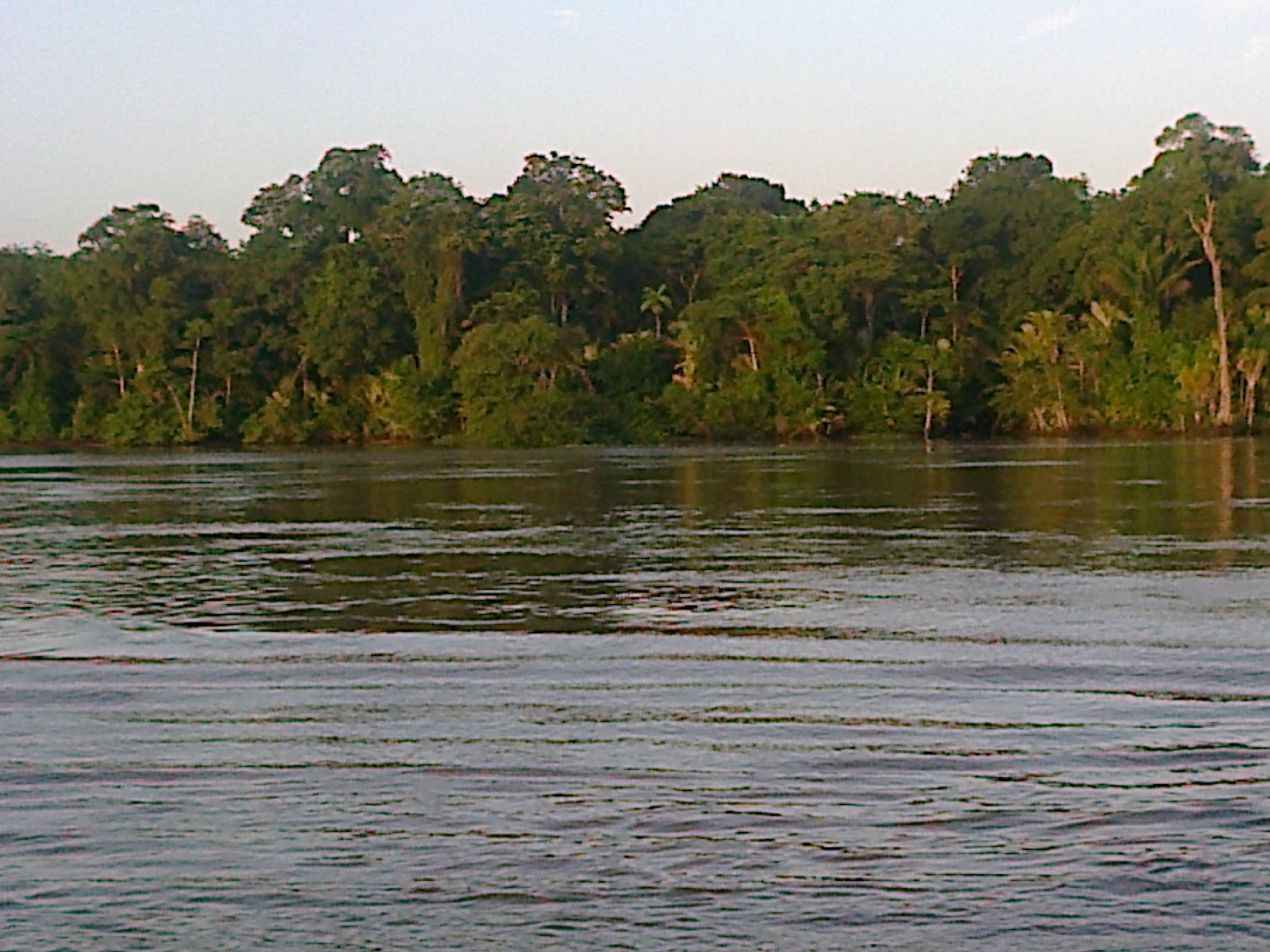
- Forest along the shore of the Amazon River, in the east of the district

- Location within Amapá Location within Brazil
- Coordinates: 0°11′25″N 50°49′18″W
- Country: Brazil
- State: Amapá
- Municipality: Macapá
- Established: 2005

Area
  - Total: 580 km^{2} (220 sq mi)
- Elevation: 2 m (6.6 ft)

Population (2010)
  - Total: 726
  - Density: 1.3/km^{2} (3.2/sq mi)
- Time zone: UTC-3 (BRT)

Carapanantuba is a district on the southern part of Macapá, Amapá, Brazil. It was created in the year 2005.

== Geography ==
It is situated on the Amazon Delta, north bank of the Amazon River, and has an average elevation of 2 meters above the sea level.

== Demographics ==
According to the Brazilian Institute of Geography and Statistics (IBGE), in 2010 the municipal district has 726 inhabitants, of which 365 are men and 361 are women, living within 175 households.
