= Marco Zero =

Monument in Macapá, Brazil

Coordinates: 0°00′02″N 51°04′42″W

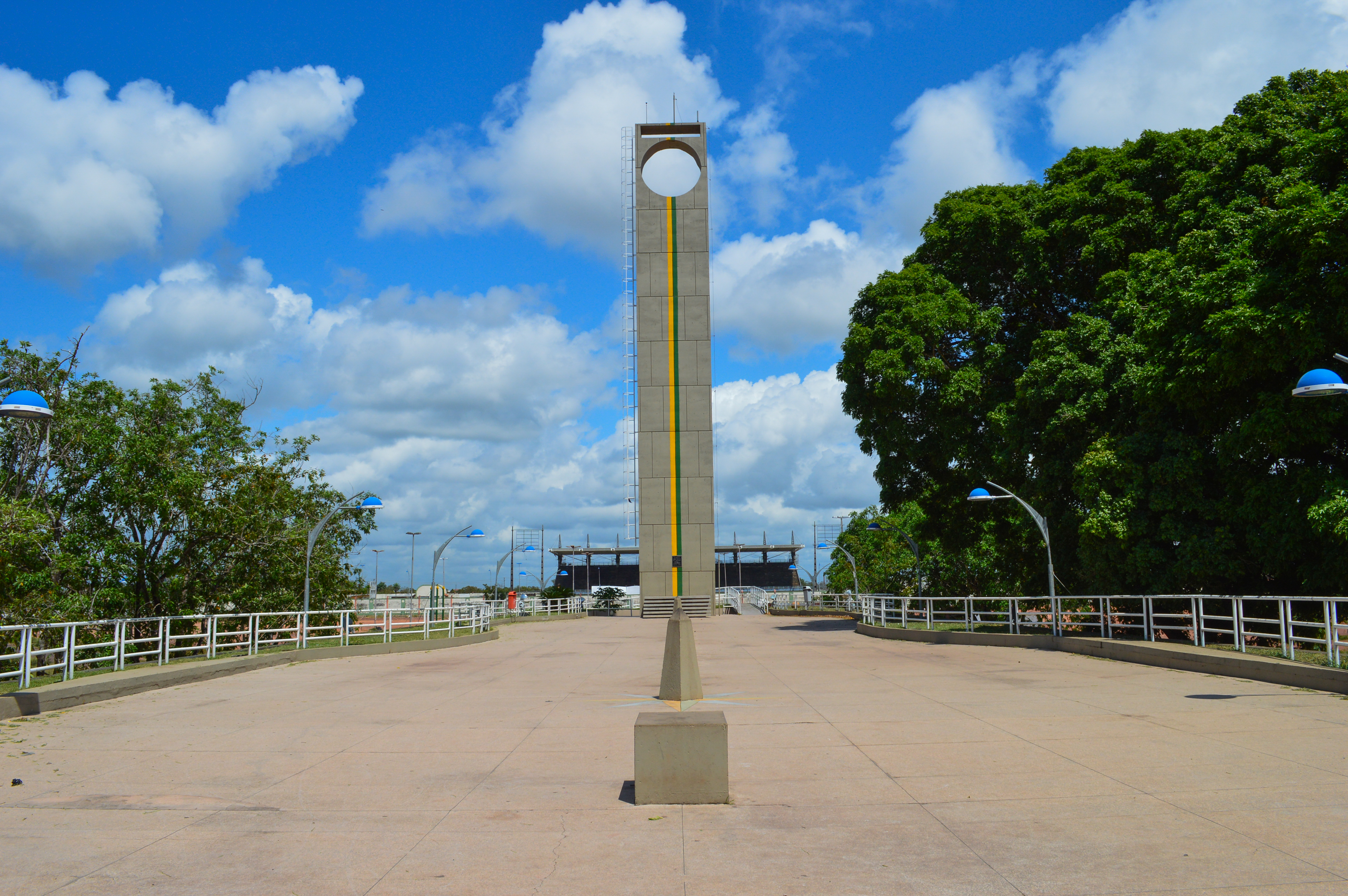
- Interactive map of Marco Zero
- Location: Macapá, Amapá, Brazil
- Opening date: 1987

Marco Zero (translatable into English as Zero Mark) is a monument located in Macapá, capital of the state of Amapá, in Brazil. Built to mark the exact passage of the equator over the city, it was inaugurated in 1987.

The monument is the most famous tourist attraction in Macapá, featuring an obelisk of 30 meters (98 ft) of height. In March and September, during the equinox, the sun fills the circular opening at the top of the obelisk, whose shadow is projected onto the ground. Equinox celebrations at the monument include attractions such as performances, workshops, and fairs.
