= Fazendinha Environmental Protection Area =

Brazilian environmentally protected area

- Área de Proteção Ambiental da Fazendinha
- IUCN category V (protected landscape/seascape)
- Location within Brazil
- Nearest city: Macapá, Amapá
- Coordinates: 0.051858°S 51.129141°W
- Area: 137 hectares (340 acres)
- Designation: Environmental protection area
- Created: 31 December 2004
- Administrator: Secretaria de Estado do Meio Ambiente do Amapá

The Fazendinha Environmental Protection Area (Portuguese: Área de Proteção Ambiental da Fazendinha) is an environmental protection area in the state of Amapá, Brazil. There has been ongoing conflict between the residents and the state agency responsible for preserving the environment and developing the ecotourism potential.

== Location ==
The Fazendinha Environmental Protection Area (APA) is in the municipality of Macapá, Amapá. It has an area of 137 hectares (340 acres). It is on the north shore of the mouth of the Amazon River on the border with the municipality of Santana, 15 kilometres (9.3 mi) from the state capital, Macapá. The APA lies between the Salvador Diniz highway to the north and the Amazon river to the south, bounded by the Igarapé Paxicu to the east and the Igarapé Fortaleza to the west.

== Environment ==
Average annual temperature is about 28 °C (82 °F). The APA is scenically beautiful, has diverse fauna and flora and has potential as a quality ecotourism destination. The main ecosystem is Várzea forest, estuarine wetlands that are often flooded. Flora includes açaí palm (Euterpe oleracea), Pentaclethra macroloba, Hevea brasiliensis, Carapa guianensis, lianas, bromeliads and orchids. There is a varied fauna of birds, reptiles and fish.

== History ==
The area was made the Macapa Forest Park in 1974. The Fazendinha Biological Reserve was created by state decree 020 of 14 December 1984 to fully preserve and protect the ecosystem and natural resources of the area. Law 873 of 31 December 2004 created the APA in the same area, with the objective of reconciling environmental protection with rational and sustainable economic use of natural resources by the local population. Law 873 did not mention the former biological reserve. The APA is part of the Amapá Biodiversity Corridor, created in 2003.

== Population ==
The 2004 census recorded 267 families in the APA with a total of 1,332 people in 192 houses. Most are illiterate or poorly educated. The first report by the Amapá Secretariat of the Environment (SEMA) on the process of occupation, use and degradation of the biological reserve was issued in 1995, updated in 1998, 2003 and 2009. A 2011 thesis said the APA was still the scene of land disputes and conflicts over socio-environmental issues. A study published in 2012 concluded that there was still no well-defined framework for environmental management in the APA.

== Sources ==
- APA da Fazendinha (in Portuguese), ISA: Instituto Socioambiental
- Corredor de Biodiversidade do Amapá Biodiversity Corridor (PDF), Belém: CI-Brasil, Governo do Amapá, Fundação Lee & Gund, 2007
- Pantoja Ferreira, Glauciela Sobrinho Cunha (2011), RELAÇÕES SOCIOAMBIENTAIS: ocupação, uso e degradação na territorialidade da APA da Fazendinha (Amapá-Amazônia – 1974 a 2010) (PDF) (Thesis), Macapá: Universidade Federal do Amapá- Unifap
- Rodrigues Menezes, Cristiane; Monteiro, Marta (January–June 2013), "Área de Proteção Ambiental da Fazendinha, Macapá–AP: análise de indicadores de efetividade do monitoramento e conservação da biodiversidade" (PDF), Estação Científica (UNIFAP) (in Portuguese), 3 (1), Macapá, ISSN 2179-1902
