= Anauerapucu =

District in Amapá, Brazil

- District
- Location within Amapá Location within Brazil
- Coordinates: 00°04′02″S 51°15′48″W
- Country: Brazil
- State: Amapá
- Municipality: Santana
- Created in: 2001

Area
  - Total: 70 km^{2} (27 sq mi)
- Elevation: 6 m (20 ft)

Population (2021)
  - Total: 810
  - Density: 12/km^{2} (30/sq mi)
- Postal code: 68925-000

Anauerapucu is a district of the Brazilian municipality of Santana in the state of Amapá. It is located on the northern shore of Vila Nova River, about 10 kilometres west of Santana. The district covers an area of 70 square kilometers, and has an average elevation of 6 meters above the sea level.

Anauerapucu was established as a district in 2001. As of the year 2021, it had a population of 810.
