= Igarapé do Lago =

District in Santana, Amapá, Brazil

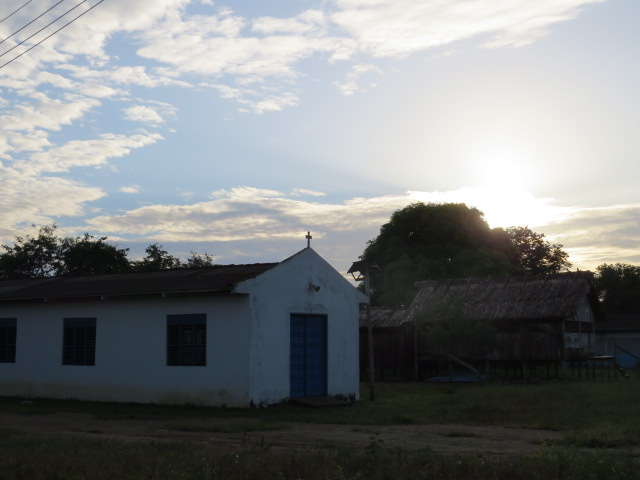
- Church of Igarapé do Lago

- Location in Brazil Igarapé do Lago (Brazil)
- Coordinates: 0.0718°N 51.4461°W
- Country: Brazil
- Region: North
- State: Amapá
- Municipality: Santana
- Founded: 1888

Population (2010)
  - Total: 651
- Time zone: UTC-3

Igarapé do Lago is a district in the Brazilian municipality of Santana, in the state of Amapá. It is located along the Igarapé do Lago River, a tributary of the Vila Nova River. The village has been recognized as a quilombo, a settlement by escaped slaves.

== Overview ==
Igarapé do Lago was founded in 1888 after the emancipation of slavery in Brazil when slaves built a settlement on the higher grounds in front of the plantation of Joana Barreto. The village is known for the annual festival of Nossa Senhora da Piedade which begins on 27 June. Every winter, the lands around the river are flooded giving the area the appearance of a lake. Igarapé do Lago became a district of Santana in 1987.

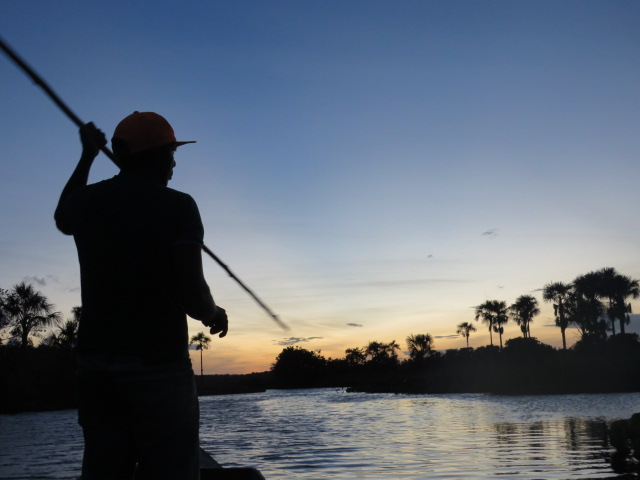
Sunset on the river near Igarapé do Lago

Igarapé do Lago has a school, a community centre, and a police station. Since 2018, Igarapé do Lago has a health care centre and an ambulance. In 2011, the village was certified as a quilombo, and has been given its own territory similar to the indigenous territories.

The economy is based on subsistence farming and fishing. The village is connected to the BR-156 highway.

The area around Igarapé do Lago is home to several archaeological sites. In 1896, three indigenous burial sites were discovered with funerary urns which are shaped like seated figures with an anthropomorphic face.
