= Augusto Puppio =

Brazilian politician (born 1982)

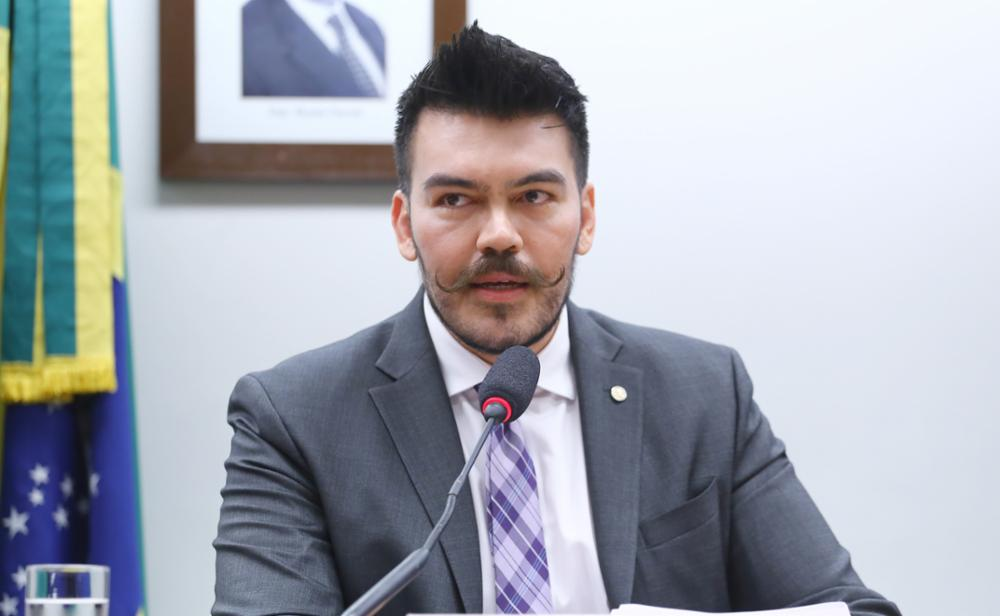
- Puppio in 2024

Member of the Chamber of Deputies
- In office 1 February 2023 – 31 July 2025
- Succeeded by: André Abdon
- Constituency: Amapá

Personal details
- Born: 9 August 1982 (age 43)
- Party: Brazilian Democratic Movement (since 2022)

José Augusto Puppio Reis Júnior (born 9 August 1982) is a Brazilian politician. From 2023 to 2025, he was a member of the Chamber of Deputies. He previously worked as a plastic surgeon.
