= Federal University of Amapá =

Public university in Brazil

Coordinates: 0.0063°S 51.0826°W

- Universidade Federal do Amapá
- University's Logo
- Other name: UNIFAP
- Type: Public
- Established: 1990
- Affiliations: ANDIFES e RENEX
- Budget: R$ 172.440.990,00 (2017)
- Chancellor: Júlio César Sá de Oliveira
- Vice-Chancellor: Simone de Almeida Delphim Leal
- Location: Macapá, Amapá, Brazil
- Campus: Macapá, Santana, Oiapoque, and Mazagão
- Website: www.unifap.br

The Federal University of Amapá (Portuguese: Universidade Federal do Amapá, UNIFAP) is a Brazilian public institution which is located in Macapá, Brazil.

== See also ==
- List of federal universities of Brazil
