= Mazagão =

Municipality in Amapá, Brazil

Mazagão Nova do Anauerapucú
- Municipality
- Município de Mazagão
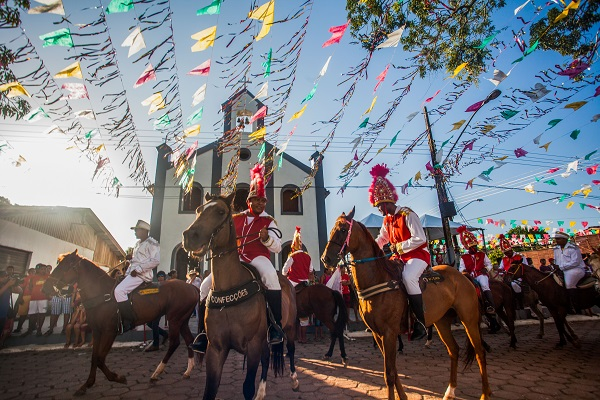
- Festival of São Tiago in Mazagão Velho

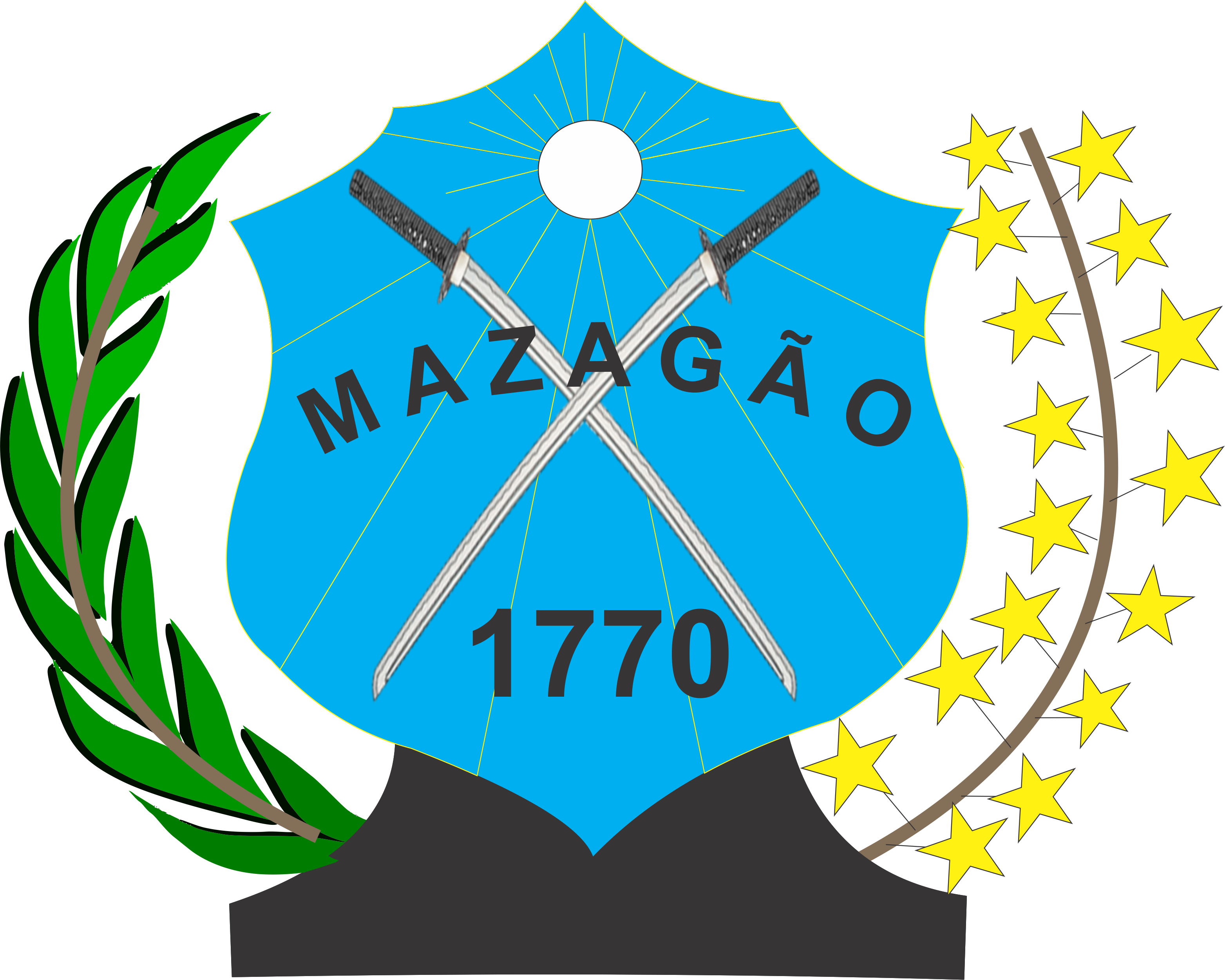
- Flag Coat of arms

- Mazagão in the state of Amapá

- Location within Brazil
- Coordinates: 00°06′54″S 51°17′20″W
- Country: Brazil
- Region: North
- State: Amapá
- Established: 15 November 1915

Government
  - Mayor: João da Silva Costa (PPL)

Area
  - Land: 13,131 km^{2} (5,070 sq mi)

Population (2020)
  - Total: 22,053
- Time zone: UTC−3 (BRT)

Mazagão (Portuguese: Município de Mazagão, [mazaˈɡɐ̃w]) is a municipality located in the south of the state of Amapá, Brazil. Its population is 22,053 and its area is 13,131 square kilometres (5,070 mi^{2}). Mazagão Velho located in the municipality of Mazagão is known for the Festival of São Tiago which takes place between 16 and 28 July, and re-enacts the war between the Moors and Christians.

== Overview ==
The city was named after the Portuguese colony Mazagão in North Africa, now El Jadida (Morocco), in which the Portuguese got kicked in 1769 after some 250 years of occupation. Many of its inhabitants were evacuated to Brazil, where they founded a new settlement Nova Mazagão, now known as Mazagão Velho. A total of 340 families arrived in the city of Belém in 1770 and in 1773 went to Nova Mazagão. One of the main theories on the origin of the name of Mazagaon - one of the original Seven Islands of Bombay and still a historic neighborhood of Mumbai, India - derives this name, too, from the Moroccan city, since both were under Portuguese rule in the same time.

Mazagão Velho started to decline and Novo do Anauerapucú started become the bigger town. The town of Anauerapucú became the capital of an independent municipality in 1915, and was renamed Mazagão. Mazagão can be reached by the AP-010 from Santana and Macapá.

== Geography ==
The municipality contains 44% of the 501,771-hectare (1,239,900-acre) Rio Cajari Extractive Reserve, created in 1990. It contains 19% of the 806,184-hectare (1,992,120-acre) Rio Iratapuru Sustainable Development Reserve, created in 1997. It contains part of the Jari Ecological Station. It also contains 8.56% of the 2,369,400-hectare (5,855,000-acre) Amapá State Forest, a sustainable use conservation unit established in 2006.

== Economy ==
Mazagão is known for its pottery and ceramics. A major part of the economy is based on livestock in particular cattle and buffalo, and forestry centred around the Brazil nut and rubber tree.

== Subdivions ==
The municipality of Mazagão is subdivided in three districts:

- The town of Mazagão
- Carvão
- Mazagão Velho
