= Santana, Amapá =

Municipality in Amapá, Brazil

Santana
- Municipality
- The Municipality of Santana
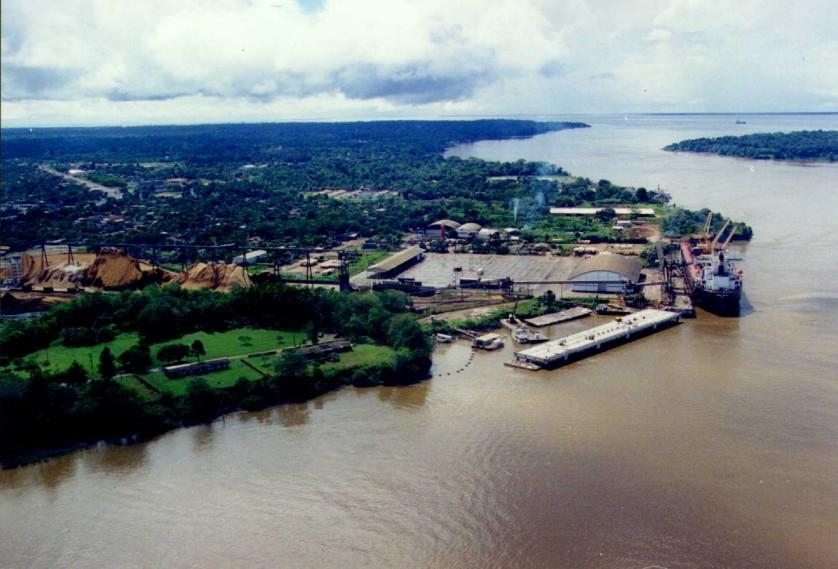
- Port of Santana

- Flag Coat of arms

- Location of Santana in the State of Amapá

- Location within Brazil
- Coordinates: 00°02′06″S 51°51′10″W
- Country: Brazil
- Region: North
- State: Amapá
- Founded: 1 January 1982

Government
  - Mayor: Ofirney Sadala (PSDC)

Area
  - Total: 1,541 km^{2} (595 sq mi)
- Elevation: 4.6 m (15 ft)

Population (2022 Census)
  - Total: 107,373
  - Estimate (2025): 118,803
  - Density: 69.68/km^{2} (180.5/sq mi)
- Time zone: UTC−3 (BRT)
- HDI (2000): 0.742 – medium
- Website: santana.ap.gov.br

Santana (Portuguese pronunciation: [sɐ̃ˈtɐnɐ]) is a municipality located in the southeast of the state of Amapá, Brazil. Its population is 107,373 (2022 Census) and its area is 1,541 square kilometres (595 square miles), which makes it the smallest municipality of Amapá. Santana is a suburb of Macapá, the state capital, and the two cities make up the Metropolitan Area of Macapá. Its location is nearly on the equator. The planet's second longest river, the Amazon is to the south.

Santana was historically a part of Macapá. In 1981 it was elevated to the category of a District of Macapá. It became a separate municipality in the state of Amapá on 1 January 1982.

== History ==
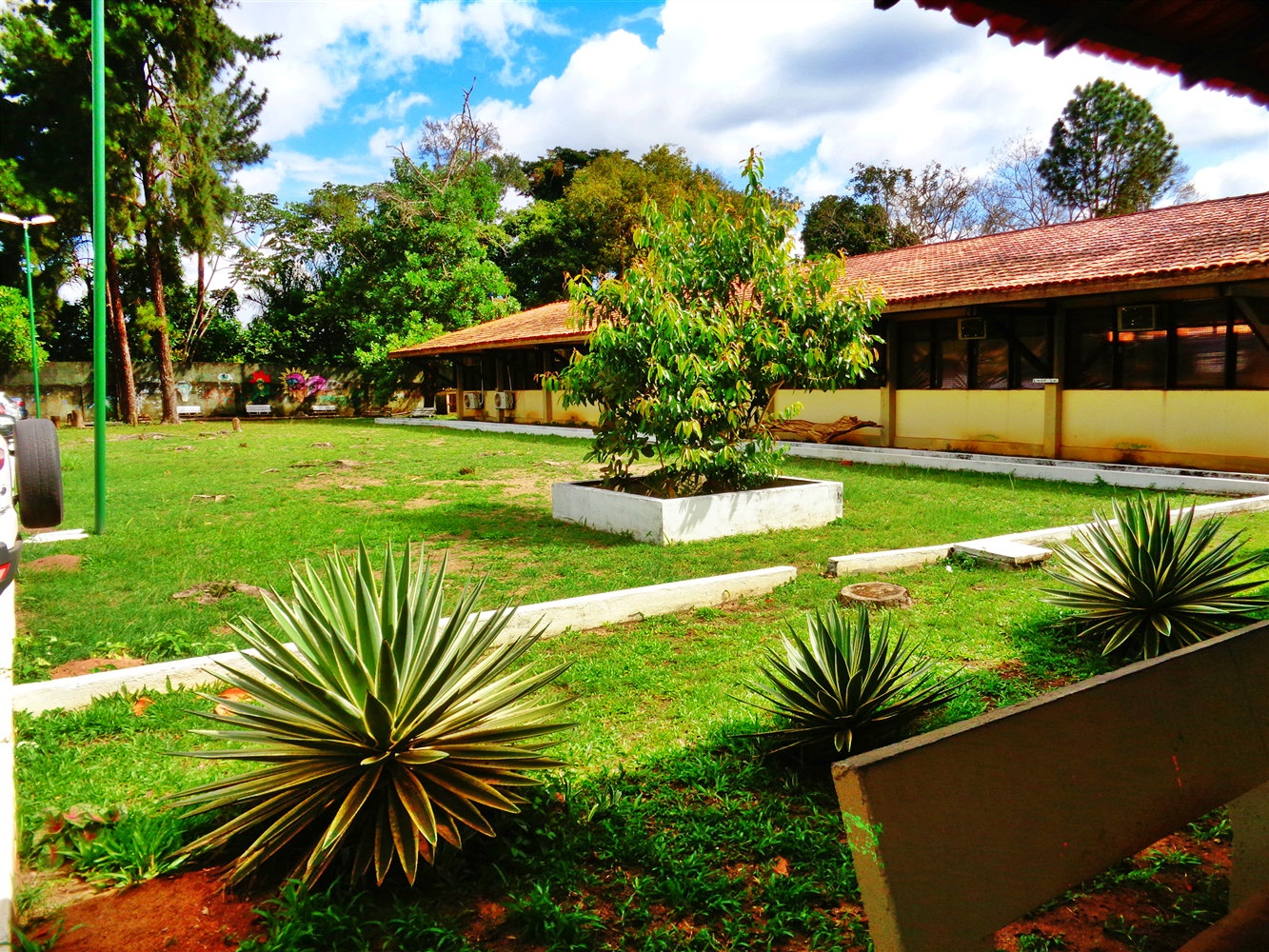
Campus of the university

The history of Santana began in 1753 when Ilha de Santana, an island in the Amazon River in front of the city of Santana, became an official settlement. The settlement on the coast started to develop in the 1950s when manganese was discovered in Serra do Navio. Santana has developed into the main harbour and industrial centre for the state, and has become the second most populous city. In 1990, a campus of the Federal University of Amapá was opened in Santana.

== Geography ==
=== Neighbouring municipalities ===
- Macapá, north and east
- Mazagão, southwest
- Porto Grande, northwest

=== Port of Santana ===
The Port of Santana was built in 1980. It was originally intended for river transport, but due to its favourable position, it quickly developed into a main harbour for international transport to and from the Caribbean, United States and European Union. The harbour was inaugurated on 6 May 1982, and became a public company in 2002.

The Port of Santana also provides ferry services. In 2020, the ferry between Santana and Belém was the largest ferry of Brazil measuring 115 metres (377 ft).

=== Districts ===
In 2001 Santana was officially divided into six districts:

- The city of Santana
- Anauerapucu
- Igarapé do Lago
- Ilha de Santana
- Piaçacá
- Pirativa

== Sports ==
Independente Esporte Clube and Santana Esporte Clube are the football clubs based in the city of Santana.

== Notable people ==
- Fabrício Guerreiro (1990), mixed martial artist
- Raulian Paiva (1995), mixed martial artist
