= Macapá =

Capital city of Amapá, Brazil

- Municipality
- Municipality of Macapá
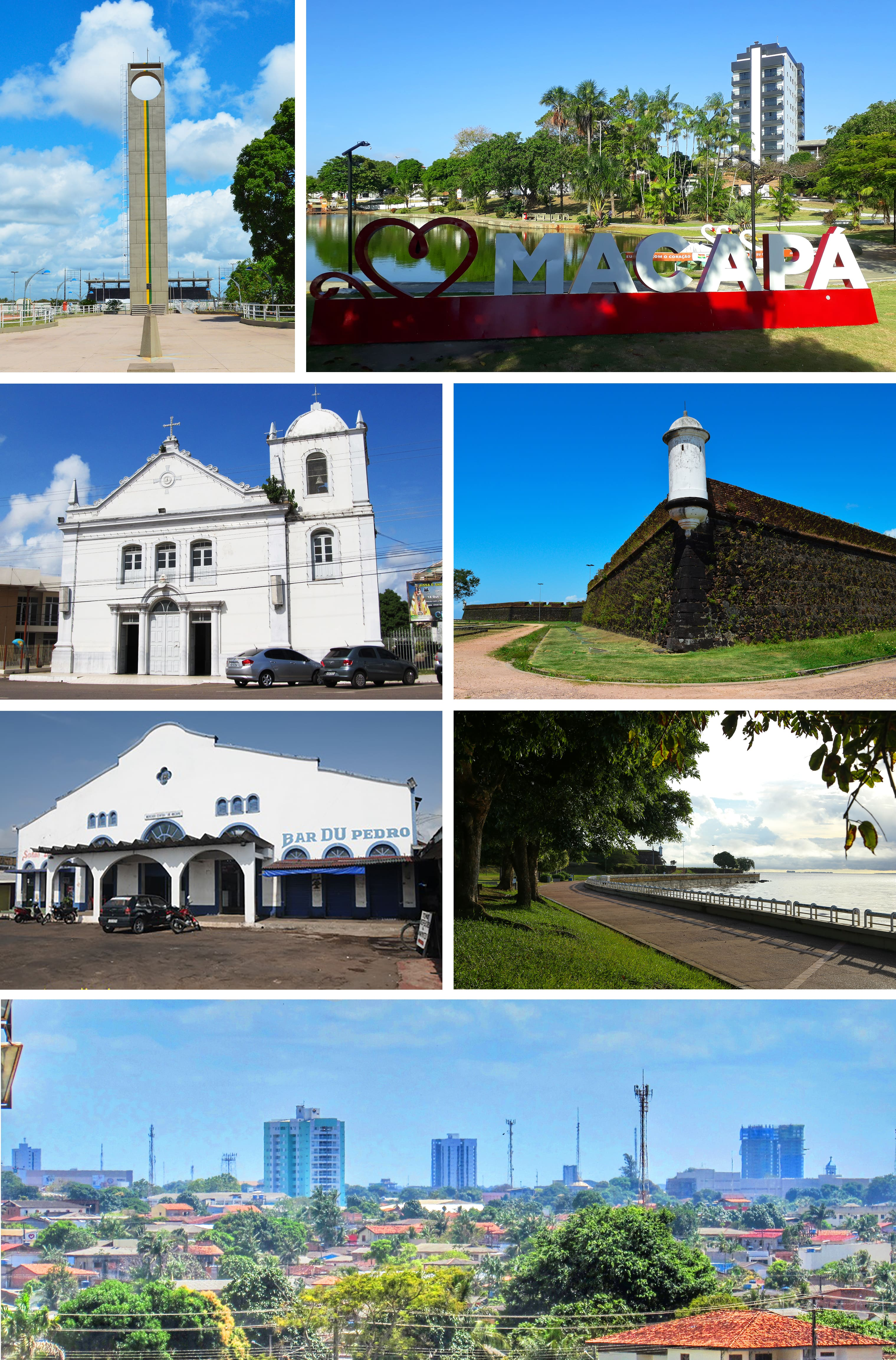
- From the top, clockwise: Marco Zero of Ecuador; Floriano Peixoto Square; Main Church of São José de Macapá; Fortress of São José de Macapá; Trapiche Eliezer Levy and Central Market; Rim of Macapá; city center view.

- Flag Coat of arms
- Nickname: "A Capital do Meio do Mundo" ("The Capital of the Middle of the World")
- Motto(s): "Macapá, cidade forte" ("Macapá, fortress city")
- Location of Macapá in the State of Amapá

- Location in Brazil
- Coordinates: 0°0′0″N 51°3′59″W
- Country: Brazil
- Region: North
- State: Amapá
- Founded: February 4, 1758

Government
  - Mayor: Pedro DaLua (acting)

Area
  - Total: 6,407.12 km^{2} (2,473.80 sq mi)
- Elevation: 12 m (39 ft)

Population (2025)
  - Total: 489,676
  - Density: 76.4269/km^{2} (197.945/sq mi)
- Demonym: macapaense (Portuguese)
- Time zone: UTC−3 (BRT)
- Postal code: 68900-001 a 68914-999
- Area code: +55 96
- HDI (2010): 0.733 – high
- Website: www.macapa-ap.com.br

Macapá (Brazilian Portuguese pronunciation: [makaˈpa]) is the capital of the Brazilian state of Amapá, in the country's North Region, located on the northern channel of the Amazon Delta near its mouth on the Atlantic Ocean. Its population is estimated to be 512,902 (2020). The city is on a small plateau on the Amazon in the southeast of the state of Amapá. The only access by road from outside the province is from the overseas French department of French Guiana, although there are regular ferries to Belém, Brazil. Macapá is linked by road with some other cities in Amapá. The equator runs through the middle of the city, leading residents to refer to Macapá as "The capital of the middle of the world." It covers 6,407.12 square kilometres (2,473.80 mi^{2}) and is located northwest of the large inland island of Marajó and south of the border with French Guiana.

== History ==
Macapá, 1968. National Archives of Brazil.

Macapá is a corruption of the Tupi word macapaba, or "place of many bacabas", the fruit of the local palm tree. The Spaniard Francisco de Orellana claimed the region in 1544 and called it Nueva Andalucía (New Andalusia). The modern town began as the base of a Portuguese military detachment, stationed there in 1738. On February 4, 1758, Sebastião Veiga Cabral, the illegitimate child of the military governor of Trás-os-Montes, Sebastião Veiga Cabral, founded the town of São José de Macapá, under the authority of the governor of Pará, Francisco Xavier de Mendonça Furtado. The fortress of São Joselito de Macapá was first laid out in 1764, but took 18 years to complete, due to illness among the Indian workers, and numerous escapes made by black slaves. Macapá experienced an intense hurricane in the Summer of 1811 causing extensive damage to the fortifications there but leaving much of the city intact. Around 1834 Macapá a strange, month-long storm caused flooding upwards of six inches a day for the region. Macapá was elevated to city status in 1854.

Macapá gained international notoriety in December 2001 when international yachtsman Peter Blake, from New Zealand, was murdered while anchored on his explorer yacht Seamaster in Macapá port. According to Business Insider, Macapá is the 69th most violent city in the world, with 26.06 homicides per 100,000 people.

== Demography ==
Macapá has a population of 499,163 in its metropolitan area, the 3rd largest in the North Region. The city alone accounts for sixty percent of the population of state of Amapá and 3.50% of the population of the entire northern region of Brazil. According to the 2010 census, the city has a population of 397,913, of which 97.92% live in urban areas and 2.08% live in rural districts. With an area of 6,563 square kilometres (2,534 mi^{2}), the population density of Macapá is approximately 60.62 inhabitants per km^{2}.

== Transportation ==
Macapá has a few roads to other cities in Brazil but is mainly connected to the rest of the country by air and sea. Macapá is located 345 kilometres (214 mi) from Belém, but the cities are separated by the large inland island of Marajó and have no direct highway connections; the city is accessible only by boat or airplane. Macapá is connected to French Guiana by the Brazilian federal highway BR-156, which runs north of the city through the Amazonian jungle. The city is connected with the rest of the North Region via the following highways: the AP-010, linking Macapá to Santana to the southwest; the AP-030, linking to the city of Mazagão; the BR-156, linking the south of Amapá and Laranjal do Jari to the northern town of Oiapoque. The Oyapoque River Bridge has been open to traffic since March 20, 2017, linking Brazil and French Guiana by road for the first time.

=== Airport ===
Macapá International Airport (officially: Aeroporto Internacional de Macapá – Alberto Alcolumbre) is located 3 kilometres (1.9 mi) from the city center and serves as a vital link between Macapá and other cities in Brazil. Commercial flights connect Macapá to Belém, Brasília, Fortaleza, Recife Airport, Rio de Janeiro, Salvador, and São Paulo. The airport traces its history to a small air base built by the United States during World War II to secure strategic bases in the South Atlantic region.

== Economy ==
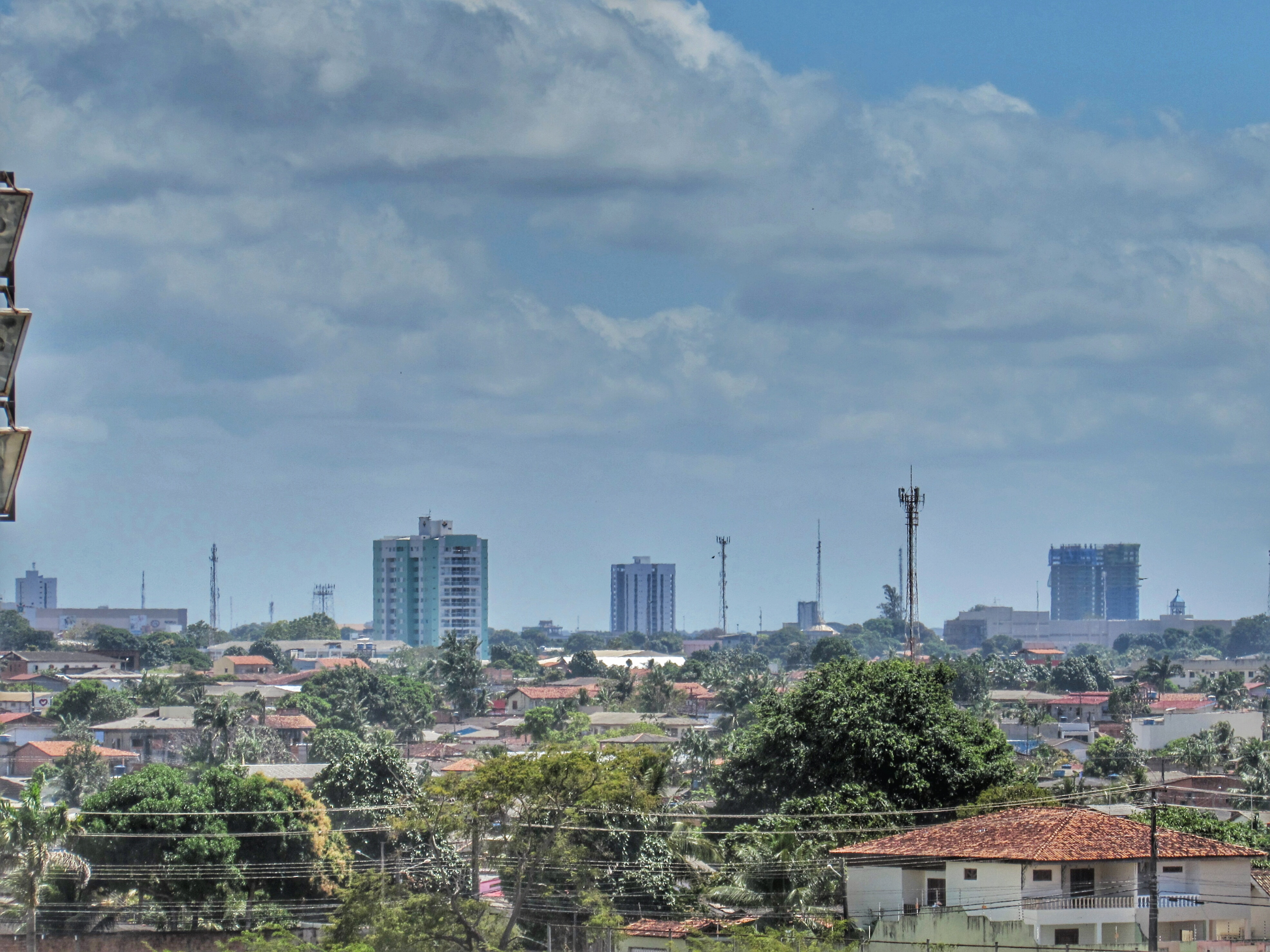
Macapá's Skyline

Macapá is an economic center of northern Brazil and serves as a commercial hub of the state of Amapá. Gold, iron, lumber, manganese, oil, timber, and tin ore from the interior of the state pass through Amapá on to Port of Santana in the neighboring municipality of Santana.

It is the fifth wealthiest city in northern Brazil, with a GDP of R$2,826,458,000 (2005). The city has a notably high rate of economic growth and a per capita income of R$7,950 (2005).

== Education ==
Portuguese is the official national language, and the primary language taught in schools. English and French are also part of the official high school curriculum.

=== Educational institutions ===
- Universidade Federal do Amapá (UNIFAP)
- Universidade Estadual do Amapá (UEAP)
- Instituto Federal do Amapá (IFAP)
- Faculdade de Macapá (Fama)
- Faculdade de Tecnologia do Amapá (META)
- Instituto Macapaense do Melhor Ensino Superior (IMMES)
- Faculdade Seama

== Landmarks ==
=== Fortress of St. Joseph ===
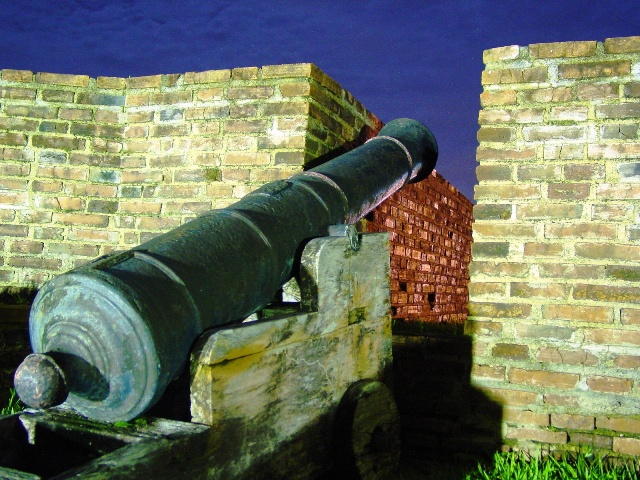
Fortress of St. Joseph

The fortress of St. Joseph is a Vauban-style star fort built between 1764 and 1782 to replace two previous fortifications located in the city. It was built to safeguard the northern extremity of Brazil and to control the Amazon Delta. It is one of the main sights of the city of Macapa.

=== Marco Zero monument ===
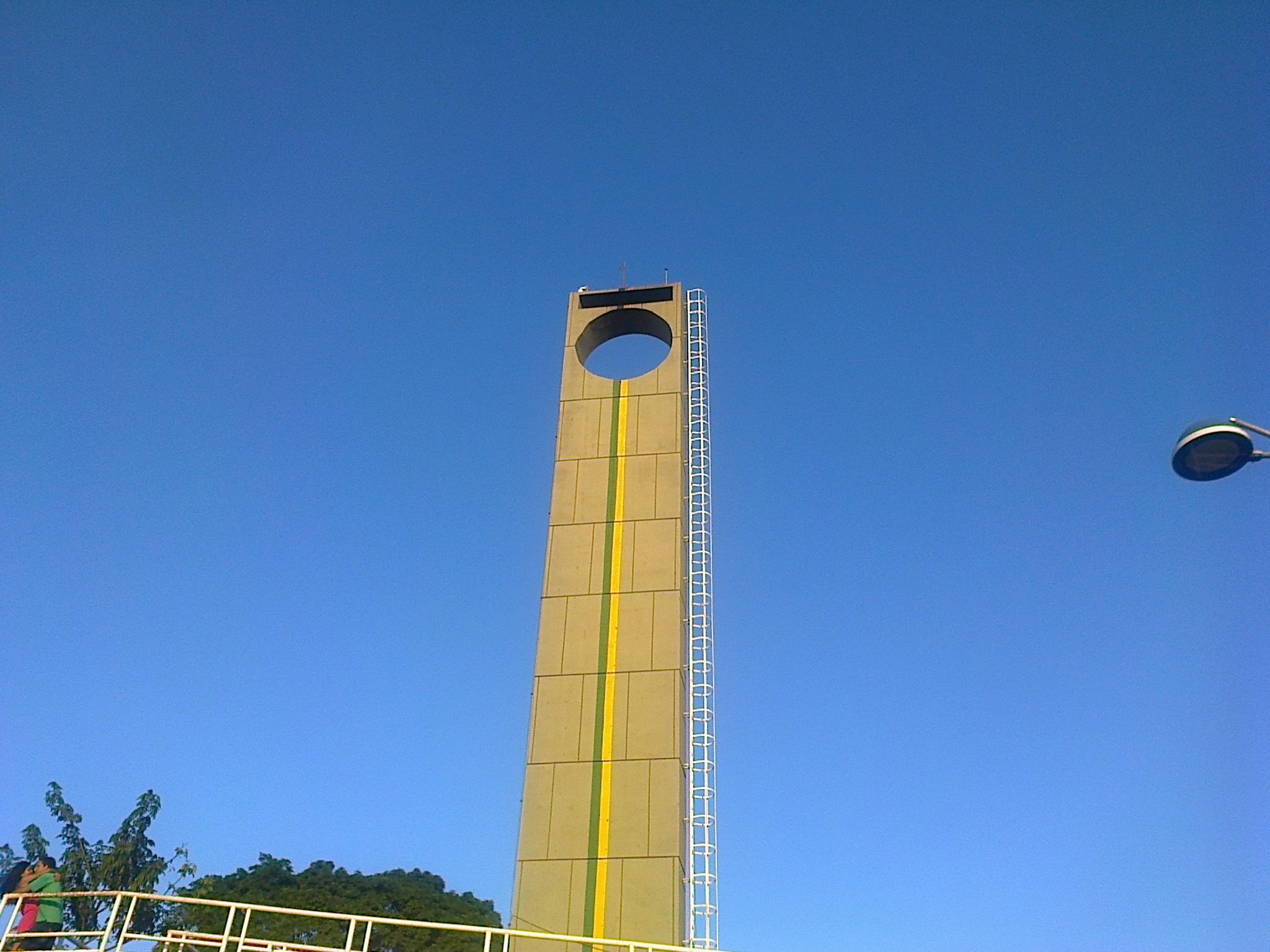
The Marco Zero Monument marks the equator line

The Marco Zero monument was built to mark the position of the equator in the city and to show the passage of the sun. At the spring and the autumn equinox the sun rises and sets on the line of the equator and shines on the monument along the Avenue Equatorial, which runs for a mile due east of it.

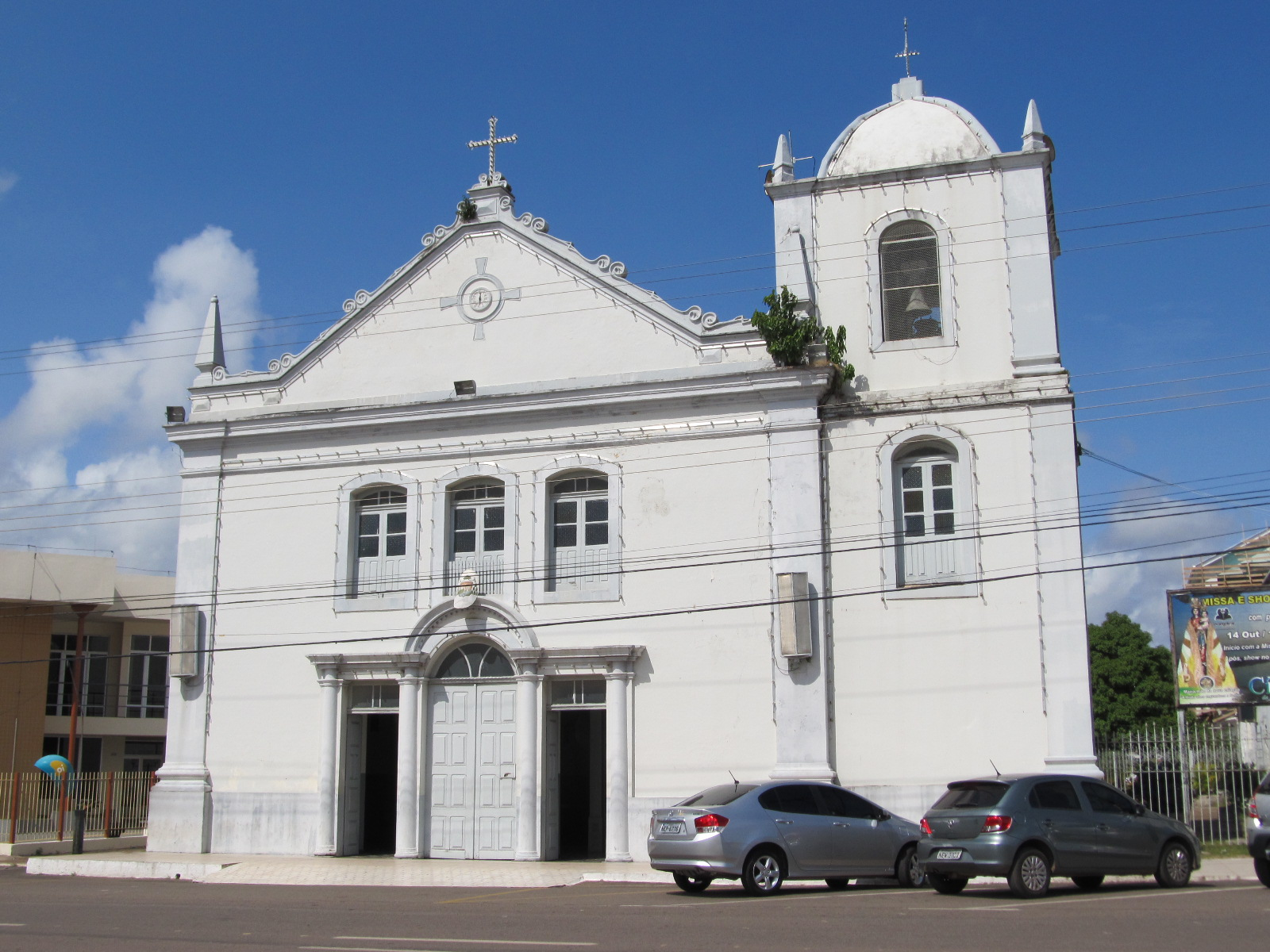
St. Joseph's Church

=== Milton Corrêa stadium ===
The Estádio Milton Corrêa, usually known as the Zerão ("Big Zero", from its position with the midfield line exactly on the equator), is a multi-purpose stadium located in central Macapá on the R. Ilvaldo Alves Veras east of the university (UNIFAP). The stadium has a maximum capacity of 10,000 people and was built in 1990. It is used mostly for football matches and hosts the home matches of several local teams.

== Geography ==
The municipality contains the 111-hectare (270-acre) Parazinho Biological Reserve, created in 1985 to protect an island in the Amazon River. It contains the 21,676-hectare (53,560-acre) Rio Curiaú Environmental Protection Area, created in 1992 to protect an area near the urban center from city sprawl, and to protect the culture of the traditional inhabitants. It contains the 137-hectare (340-acre) Fazendinha Environmental Protection Area, created in 2004.

=== Climate ===
The Macapá region includes large tracts of tropical rainforest and experiences relatively high rainfall. Macapá features a tropical monsoon climate (Am) under the Köppen climate classification, with a lengthy wet season from December through July, and a relatively short dry season that covers the remaining four months. However, a noticeable amount of rain is observed even during the dry season, a trait common to a number of other areas with this climate. Average temperatures are relatively consistent throughout the year, hovering around 23 °C (73 °F) in the mornings and 31 °C (88 °F) in the afternoon.

Climate data for Macapá (1991–2020 normals, extremes 1967–present)
Month	Jan	Feb	Mar	Apr	May	Jun	Jul	Aug	Sep	Oct	Nov	Dec	Year
Record high °C (°F)	36.0 (96.8)	35.0 (95.0)	39.3 (102.7)	38.3 (100.9)	36.0 (96.8)	36.0 (96.8)	37.0 (98.6)	37.0 (98.6)	37.0 (98.6)	36.6 (97.9)	39.6 (103.3)	38.0 (100.4)	39.6 (103.3)
Mean daily maximum °C (°F)	30.9 (87.6)	30.2 (86.4)	30.4 (86.7)	30.7 (87.3)	31.3 (88.3)	31.8 (89.2)	32.1 (89.8)	32.8 (91.0)	33.4 (92.1)	33.8 (92.8)	33.4 (92.1)	32.4 (90.3)	31.9 (89.5)
Daily mean °C (°F)	26.6 (79.9)	26.2 (79.2)	26.4 (79.5)	26.6 (79.9)	27.0 (80.6)	27.1 (80.8)	27.2 (81.0)	27.9 (82.2)	28.5 (83.3)	28.8 (83.8)	28.7 (83.7)	27.8 (82.0)	27.4 (81.3)
Mean daily minimum °C (°F)	23.6 (74.5)	23.5 (74.3)	23.7 (74.7)	24.0 (75.2)	24.2 (75.6)	24.0 (75.2)	23.9 (75.0)	24.3 (75.7)	24.3 (75.7)	24.4 (75.9)	24.3 (75.7)	24.0 (75.2)	24.0 (75.2)
Record low °C (°F)	19.6 (67.3)	20.4 (68.7)	21.1 (70.0)	20.2 (68.4)	21.4 (70.5)	21.0 (69.8)	20.2 (68.4)	21.0 (69.8)	21.0 (69.8)	21.0 (69.8)	21.0 (69.8)	20.4 (68.7)	19.6 (67.3)
Average precipitation mm (inches)	268.1 (10.56)	369.3 (14.54)	400.1 (15.75)	376.4 (14.82)	308.4 (12.14)	252.4 (9.94)	203.9 (8.03)	96.3 (3.79)	25.4 (1.00)	22.7 (0.89)	58.1 (2.29)	144.6 (5.69)	2,525.7 (99.44)
Average precipitation days (≥ 1 mm)	16.6	19.5	22.3	21.3	20.5	18.2	16.3	9.1	3.2	2.0	3.9	9.4	162.3
Average relative humidity (%)	84.5	87.1	87.2	87.2	86.2	84.1	82.1	78.0	73.1	71.0	72.5	78.1	80.9
Average dew point °C (°F)	24.2 (75.6)	24.2 (75.6)	24.3 (75.7)	24.6 (76.3)	24.8 (76.6)	24.7 (76.5)	24.4 (75.9)	24.5 (76.1)	24.1 (75.4)	23.9 (75.0)	24.0 (75.2)	24.2 (75.6)	24.3 (75.8)
Mean monthly sunshine hours	158.1	117.1	120.9	125.8	164.5	198.9	234.3	267.6	273.6	285.3	254.9	215.0	2,416
Mean daily daylight hours	12.1	12.1	12.1	12.1	12.1	12.1	12.1	12.1	12.1	12.1	12.1	12.1	12.1
Average ultraviolet index	6	6	6	6	7	7	7	7	7	7	7	6	7
Source 1: Instituto Nacional de Meteorologia (sun 1981–2010)
Source 2: Meteo Climat (record highs and lows) and Weather Atlas (UV index)

=== Subdivisions ===
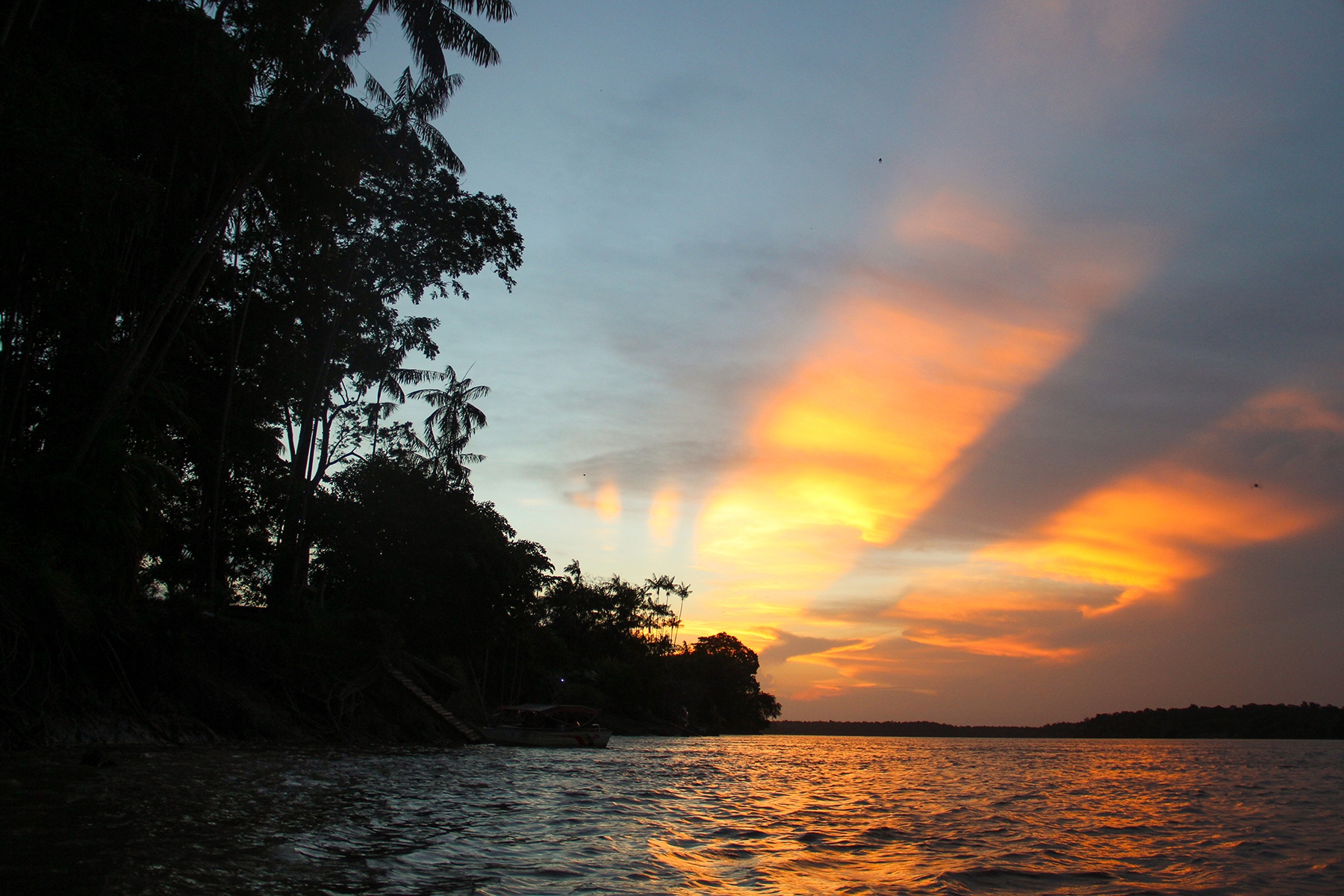
Sunset in Vila Progresso, Bailique

The municipality is subdivided in five districts:

- Macapá, the city proper
- Bailique
- Carapanantuba
- Fazendinha
- São Joaquim do Pacuí

In 1992, the villages of Curiaú de Dentro, Curiaú de Fora, Casa Grande, Curralinho and Mocambo in the municipality of Macapá were recognised as quilombos, settlements by escaped slaves, resulting in the establishment of the Rio Curiaú Environmental Protection Area.

== See also ==
- Central Market of Macapá
