= 2016 Republican Party presidential candidates =

Republican Party presidential candidates, 2016
- November 8, 2016

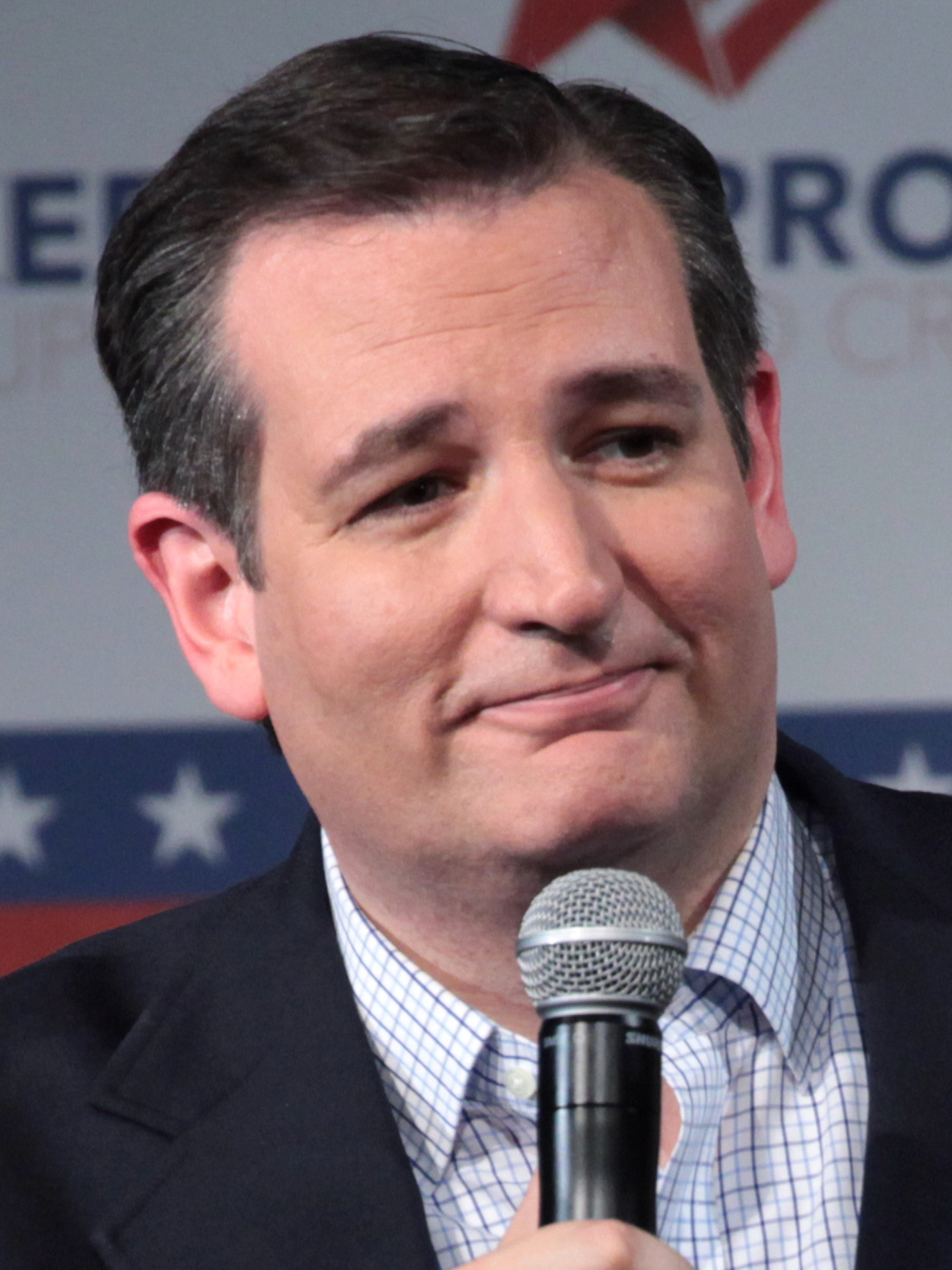
Candidate	Donald Trump	Ted Cruz
Home state	New York	Texas
Estimated delegate count	1,441	551

This article contains the list of candidates associated with the 2016 Republican Party presidential primaries for the 2016 United States presidential election.

== Candidates ==
Individuals included in this section have their own Wikipedia page and either formally announced their candidacy or filed as a candidate with Federal Election Commission (FEC) (for other than exploratory purposes).

=== Nominee ===
Name	Born (Note: Age computed on election day)	Current/previous positions	State	Announced	Candidate Logo and campaign link	Ref
Donald Trump	June 14, 1946 (age 70); Queens, New York	Chairman & President of The Trump Organization (1971–2017); Reform Party presidential candidate in 2000	New York	June 16, 2015	(Campaign • Positions • Website); FEC filing	

=== Withdrew during the primaries ===
The following individuals participated in at least two presidential debates. They withdrew or suspended their campaigns at some point after the Iowa caucuses on February 1, 2016. They are listed in order of exit, starting with the most recent.

Name	Born	Current/recent	State	Announced	Withdrew	Candidacy	Endorsed	Ref
John Kasich	May 13, 1952 (age 64); McKees Rocks, Pennsylvania	69th Governor of Ohio (2011–2019)	Ohio	July 21, 2015	May 4, 2016	(Campaign • Positions • Website); FEC filing	No endorsement (wrote in John McCain)	
Ted Cruz	December 22, 1970 (age 45); Calgary, Alberta, Canada	United States Senator from Texas (2013–present)	Texas	March 23, 2015	May 3, 2016	(Campaign • Positions • Website); FEC filing	Donald Trump	
Marco Rubio	May 28, 1971 (age 45); Miami, Florida	United States Senator from Florida (2011–2025)	Florida	April 13, 2015	March 15, 2016 (ran for re-election)	(Campaign • Positions • Website); FEC filing	Donald Trump	
Ben Carson	September 18, 1951 (age 65); Detroit, Michigan	Director of Pediatric Neurosurgery, Johns Hopkins Hospital (1984–2013)	Maryland	May 4, 2015	March 2, 2016	(Campaign • Positions • Website); FEC filing	Donald Trump	
Jeb Bush	February 11, 1953 (age 63); Midland, Texas	43rd Governor of Florida (1999–2007)	Florida	June 15, 2015	February 20, 2016	(Campaign • Positions • Website); FEC filing	Ted Cruz, then no endorsement	
Jim Gilmore	October 6, 1949 (age 67); Richmond, Virginia	68th Governor of Virginia (1998–2002)	Virginia	July 30, 2015	February 12, 2016	(Campaign • Positions • Website); FEC filing	Donald Trump	
Chris Christie	September 6, 1962 (age 54); Newark, New Jersey	55th Governor of New Jersey (2010–2018)	New Jersey	June 30, 2015	February 10, 2016	(Campaign • Positions • Website); FEC filing	Donald Trump	
Carly Fiorina	September 6, 1954 (age 62); Austin, Texas	CEO of Hewlett-Packard (1999–2005)	California	May 4, 2015	February 10, 2016	(Campaign • Positions • Website); FEC filing	Ted Cruz, then Donald Trump, later rescinded endorsement	
Rick Santorum	May 10, 1958 (age 58); Winchester, Virginia	United States Senator from Pennsylvania (1995–2007)	Pennsylvania	May 27, 2015	February 3, 2016	(Campaign • Positions • Website); FEC filing	Marco Rubio, then Donald Trump	
Rand Paul	January 7, 1963 (age 53); Pittsburgh, Pennsylvania	United States Senator from Kentucky (2011–present)	Kentucky	April 7, 2015	February 3, 2016 (ran for re-election)	(Campaign • Positions • Website); FEC filing	Donald Trump	
Mike Huckabee	August 24, 1955 (age 61); Hope, Arkansas	44th Governor of Arkansas (1996–2007)	Arkansas	May 5, 2015	February 1, 2016	(Campaign • Positions • Website); FEC filing	Donald Trump	

=== Withdrew before the primaries ===
The following individuals participated in at least one authorized presidential debate but withdrew from the race before the Iowa caucuses on February 1, 2016. They are listed in order of exit, starting with the most recent.

Name	Born	Current/recent	State	Announced	Withdrew	Candidacy	Endorsed	Ref
George Pataki	June 24, 1945 (age 71); Peekskill, New York	53rd Governor of New York (1995–2006)	New York	May 28, 2015	December 29, 2015	(Campaign • Positions • Website); FEC filing	Marco Rubio, then John Kasich, then no endorsement	
Lindsey Graham	July 9, 1955 (age 61); Central, South Carolina	United States Senator from South Carolina (2003–2026)	South Carolina	June 1, 2015	December 21, 2015	(Campaign • Positions • Website); FEC filing	Jeb Bush, then Ted Cruz, then Evan McMullin	
Bobby Jindal	June 10, 1971 (age 45); Baton Rouge, Louisiana	55th Governor of Louisiana (2008–2016)	Louisiana	June 24, 2015	November 17, 2015	(Campaign • Positions • Website); FEC filing	Marco Rubio, then Donald Trump	
Scott Walker	November 2, 1967 (age 49); Colorado Springs, Colorado	45th Governor of Wisconsin (2011–2019)	Wisconsin	July 13, 2015	September 21, 2015	(Campaign • Positions • Website); FEC Filing	Ted Cruz, then Donald Trump	
Rick Perry	March 4, 1950 (age 66); Haskell, Texas	47th Governor of Texas (2000–2015)	Texas	June 4, 2015	September 11, 2015	(Campaign • Positions • Website); FEC Filing	Ted Cruz, then Donald Trump	

=== Other candidates ===
The following notable individuals filed as candidates with FEC by November 2015.

Name	Born	Current/previous positions	State	Announced	Candidacy	Ballot status	Ref
Jack Fellure	October 3, 1931 (age 85); Midkiff, West Virginia	Perennial candidate Prohibition Party nominee in 2012	West Virginia	November 7, 2012	FEC Filing	none	
Andy Martin	October 31, 1945 (age 71); Middletown, Connecticut	Perennial candidate Birther activist vexatious litigant.	New York	August 16, 2015	(Website); FEC Filing	169 votes NH	

Additionally, Peter Messina was on the ballot in Louisiana, New Hampshire, and Idaho. Tim Cook was on the ballot in Louisiana, New Hampshire and Arizona. Walter Iwachiw was on the ballot in Florida and New Hampshire.

=== Other withdrawn candidates ===
Individuals in this section formally announced a bid for the nomination of the Republican Party, and filed with the FEC to be a candidate, but were not featured in any major opinion polls, and were not invited to any televised presidential primary debates.

Name	Born	Current/previous positions	State	Announced	Withdrew	Candidacy	Ref
Dennis Michael Lynch	August 28, 1969 (age 47)	Businessman; Documentary film maker Conservative commentator	New York	April 22, 2015	May 3, 2015	FEC filing	
Mark Everson	September 10, 1954 (age 62); New York City, New York	Commissioner of Internal Revenue (2003–2007)	Mississippi	March 5, 2015	November 5, 2015	(Website); FEC Filing	
Jimmy McMillan	December 1, 1946 (age 69); New Smyrna Beach, Florida	Chairman and leader of the Rent Is Too Damn High Party (2005–2015)	New York	August 22, 2015	December 9, 2015	(Website); FEC Filing	

== Potential candidates who did not run ==
=== Previous ===
The following people were the focus of presidential speculation in multiple media reports during the 2016 election cycle but did not enter the race.

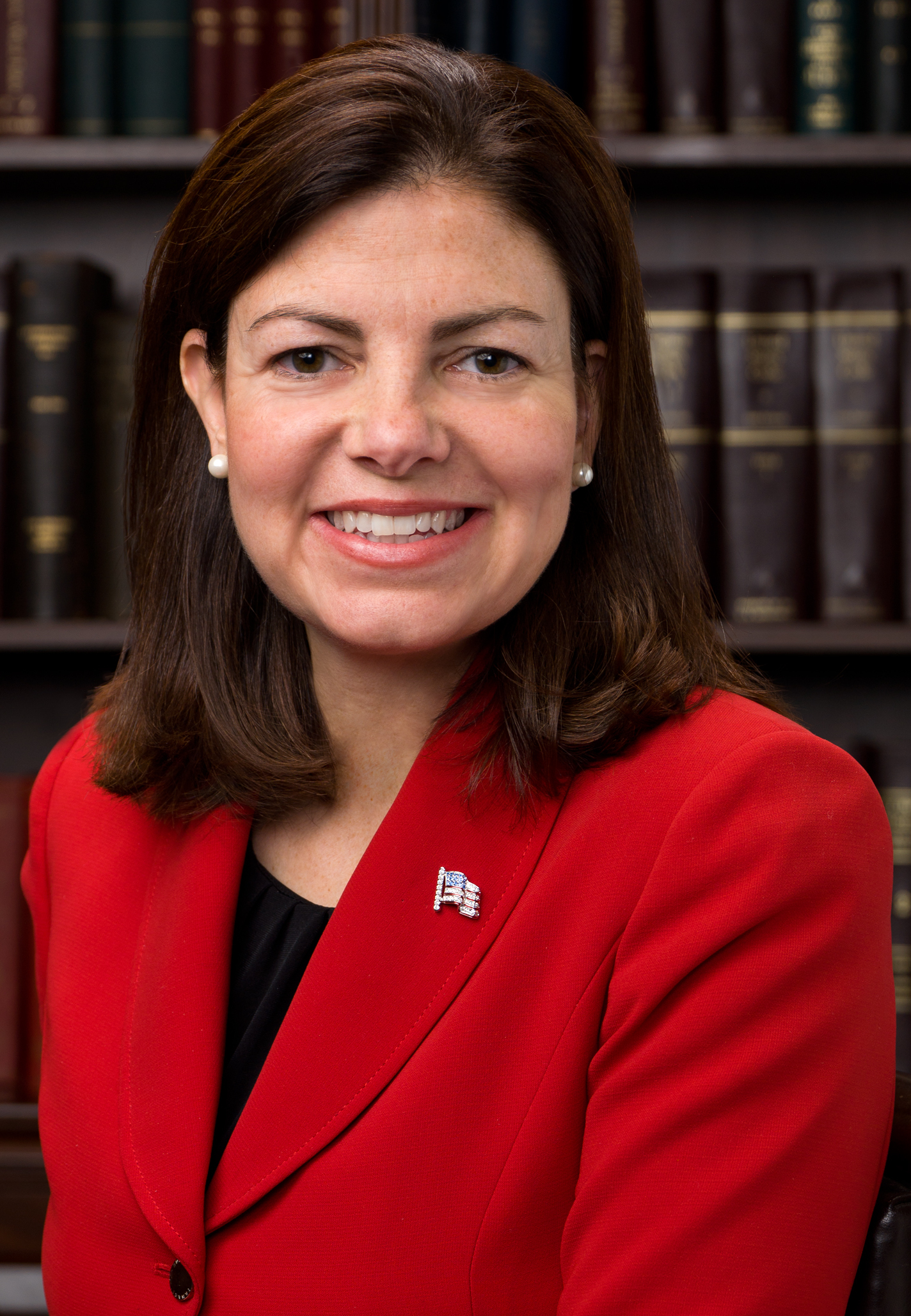
Kelly Ayotte
U.S. Senator from New Hampshire 2011–2017

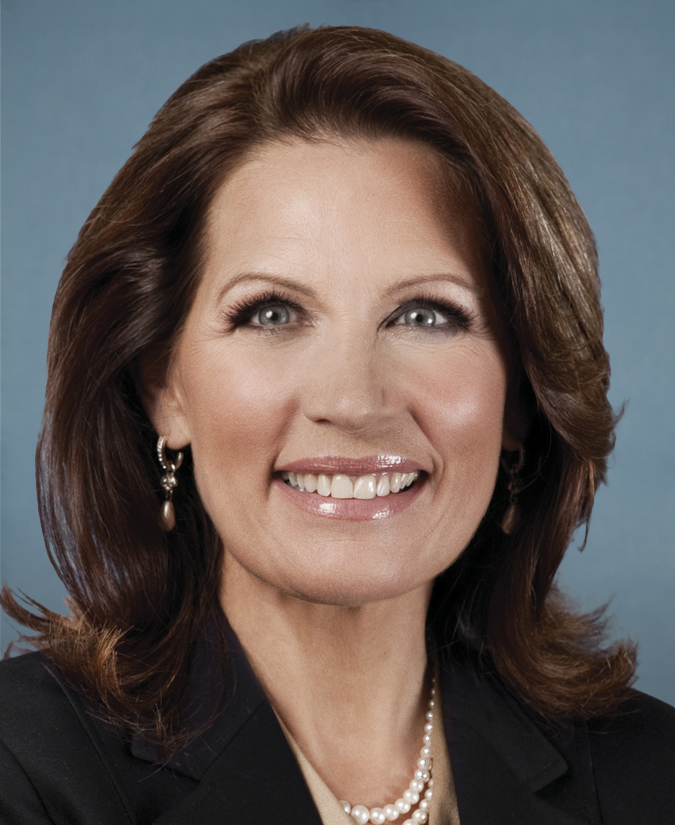
Michele Bachmann
U.S. Representative from Minnesota 2007–15, presidential candidate in 2012

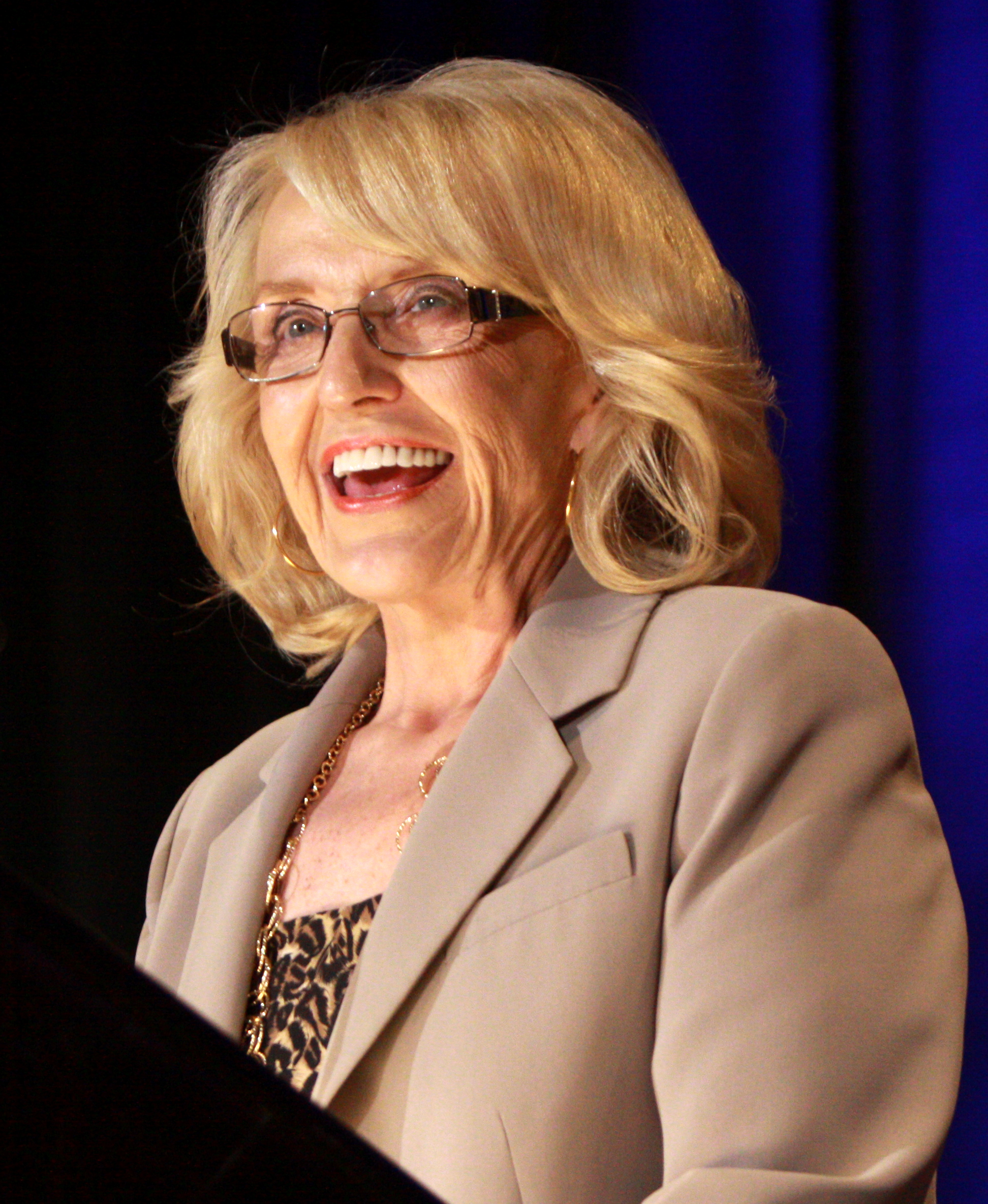
Jan Brewer
Governor of Arizona 2009–15
Endorsed Donald Trump

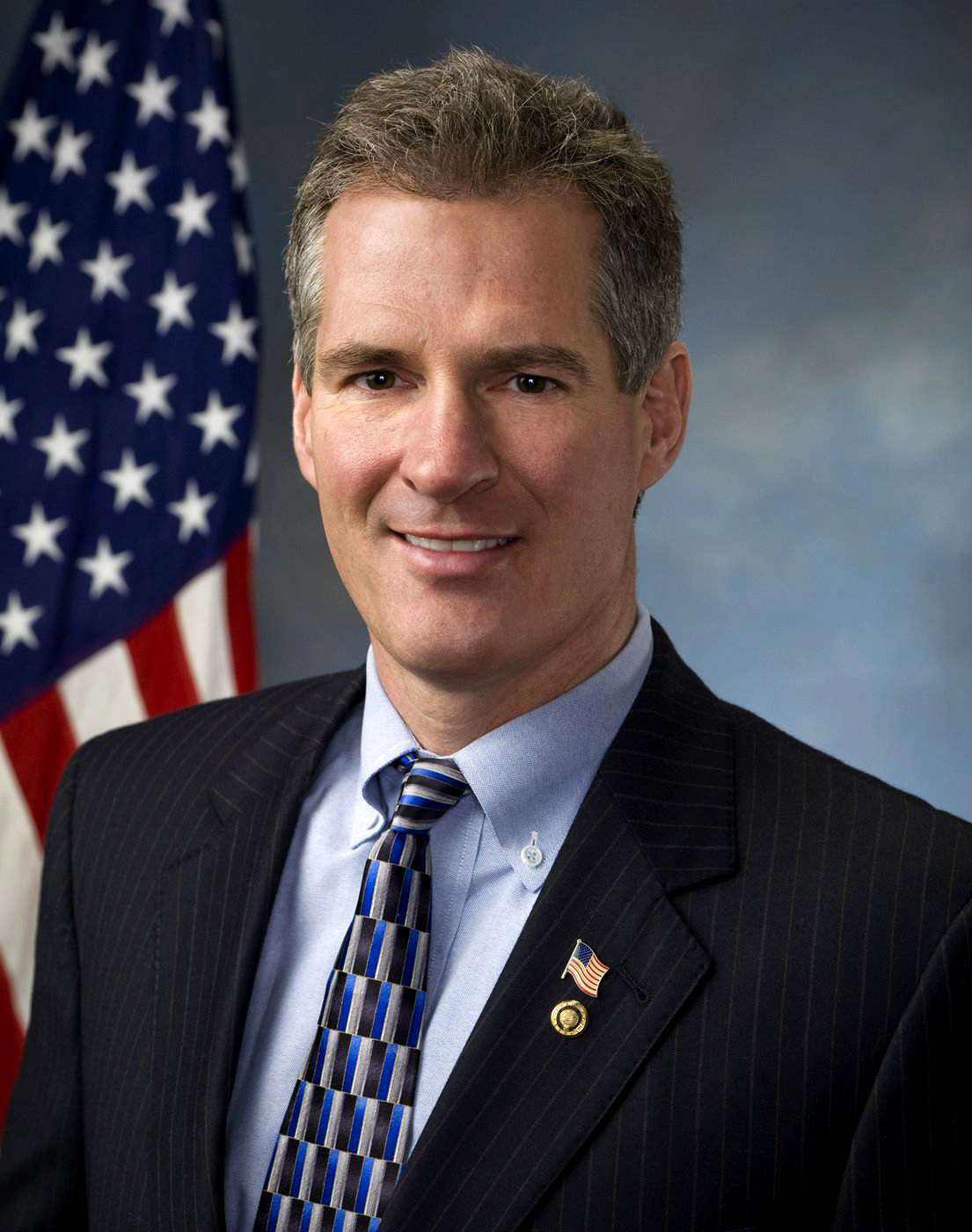
Scott Brown
U.S. Senator from Massachusetts 2010–13
Endorsed Donald Trump

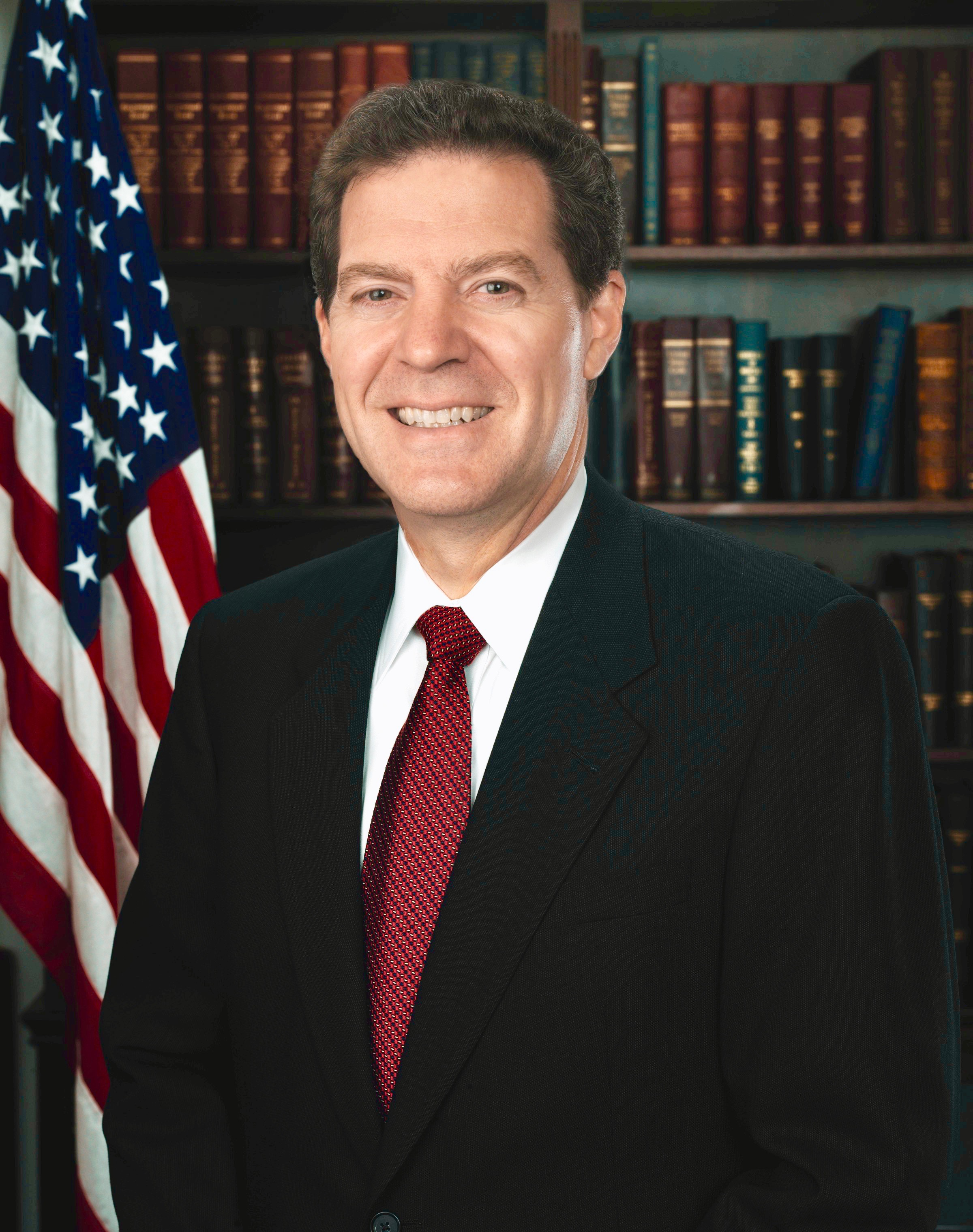
Sam Brownback
Governor of Kansas 2011–2018, presidential candidate in 2008
Endorsed Marco Rubio

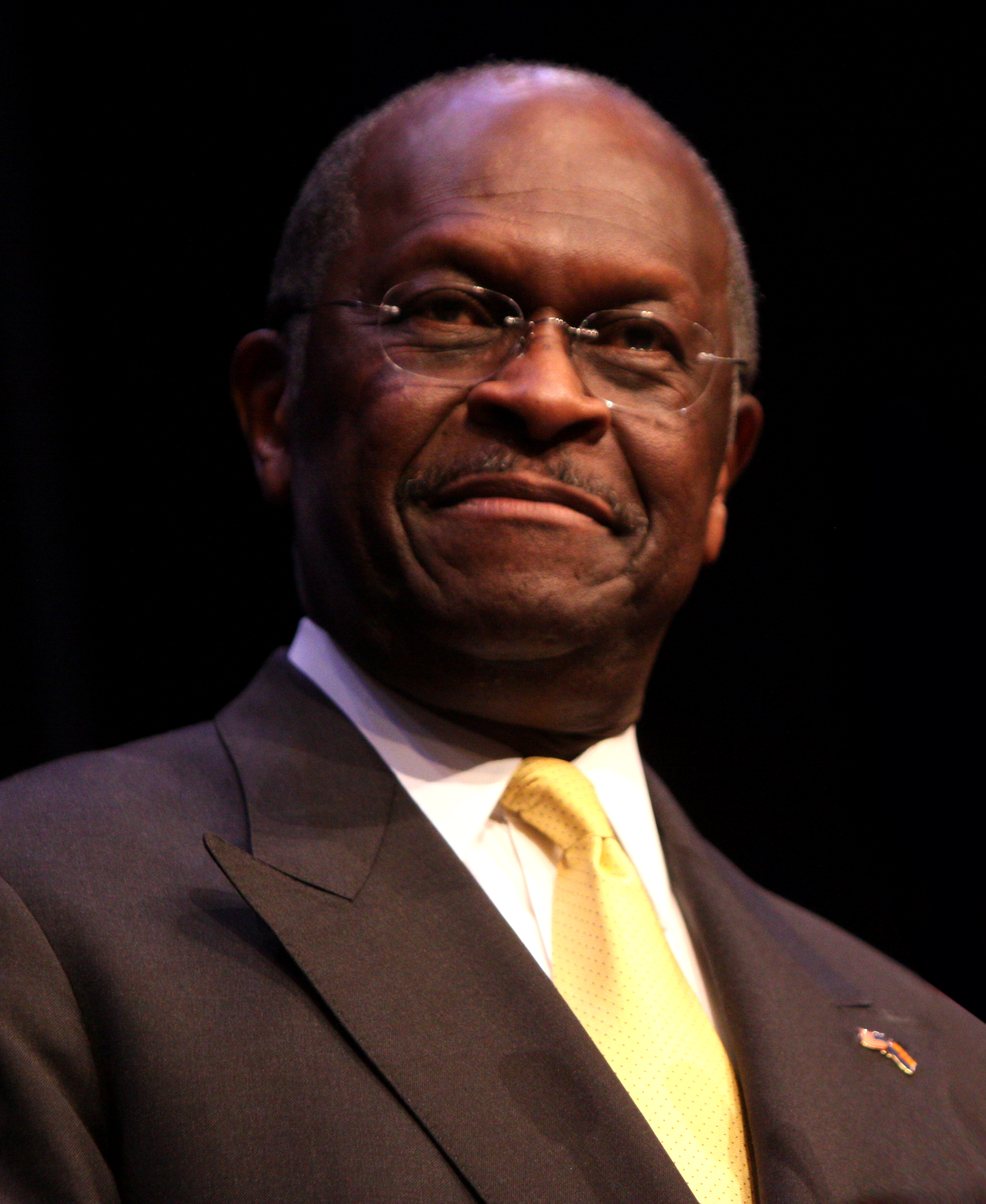
Herman Cain
President of the National Restaurant Association 1996–99; presidential candidate in 2012

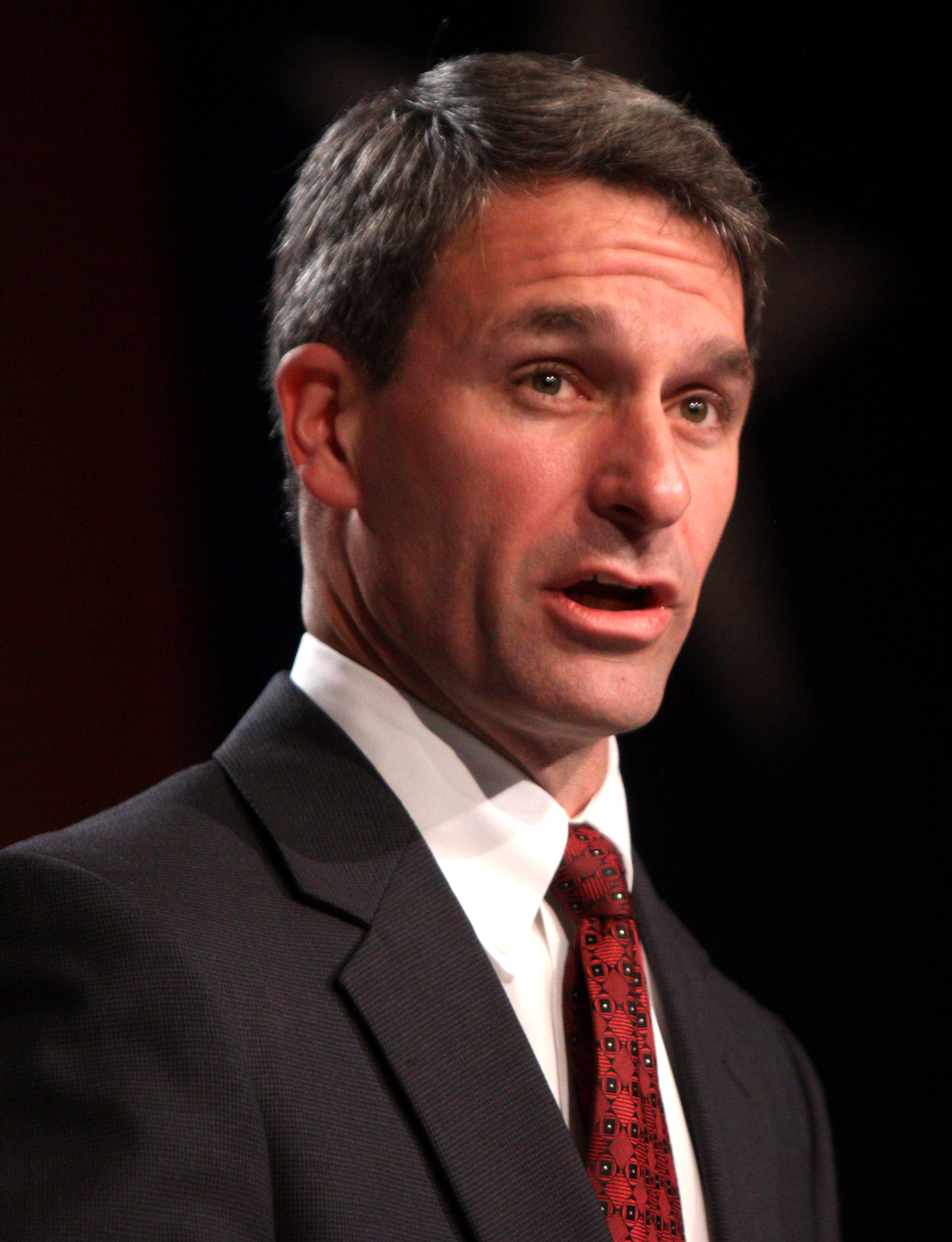
Ken Cuccinelli
Attorney General of Virginia 2010–14; nominee for Governor of Virginia in 2013
Endorsed Ted Cruz

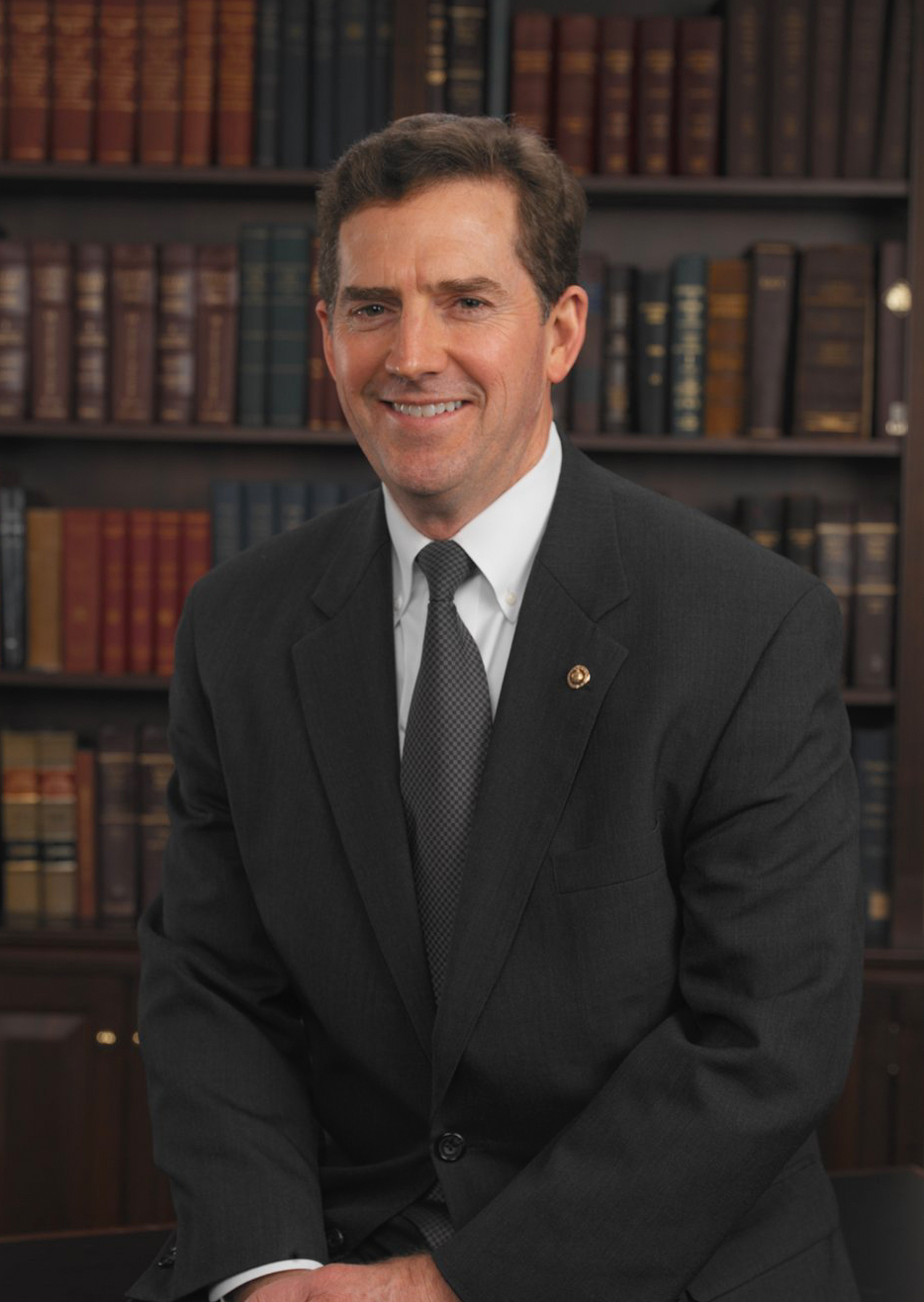
Jim DeMint
U.S. Senator from South Carolina 2005–13

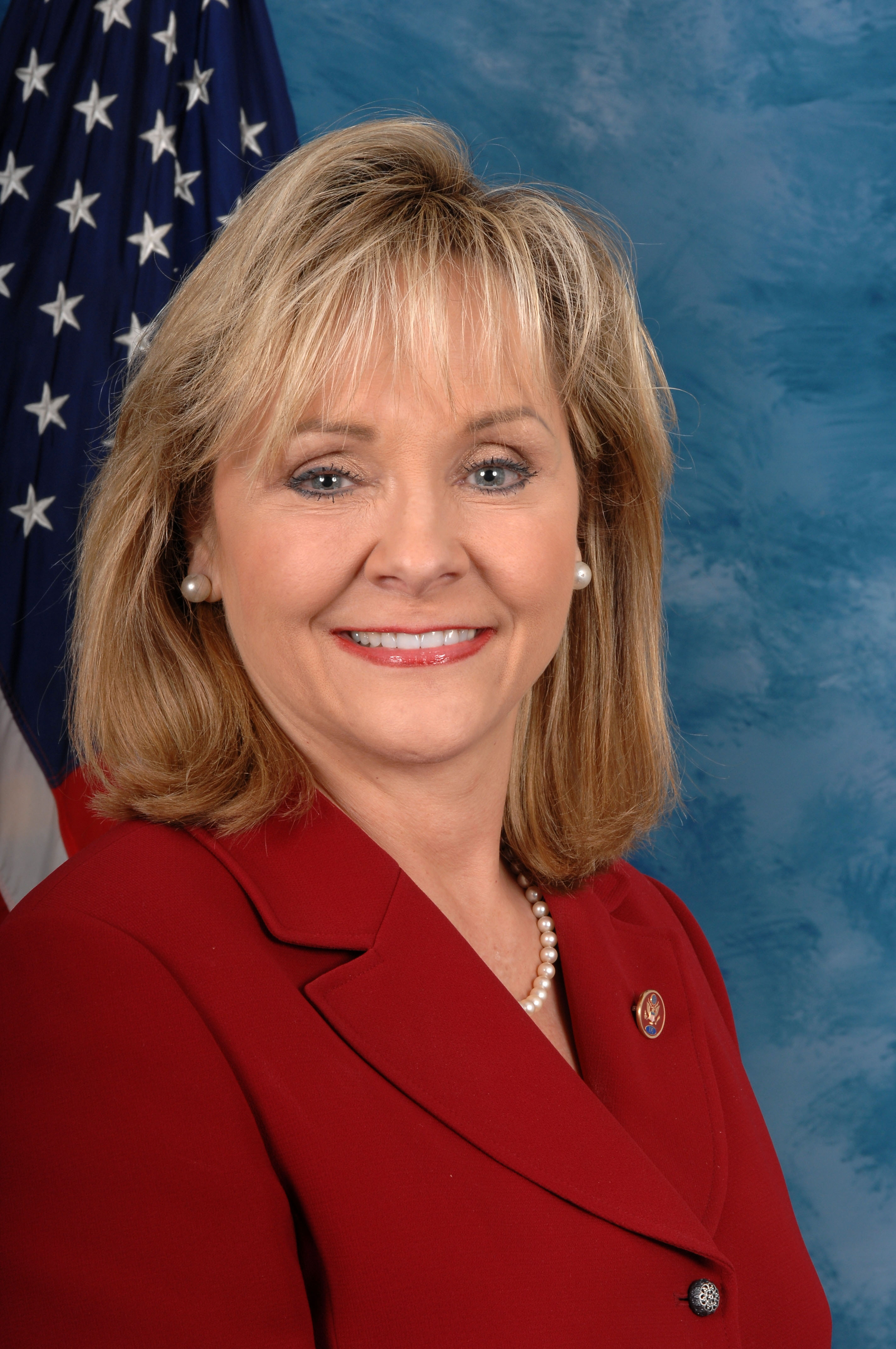
Mary Fallin
Governor of Oklahoma 2011–2019

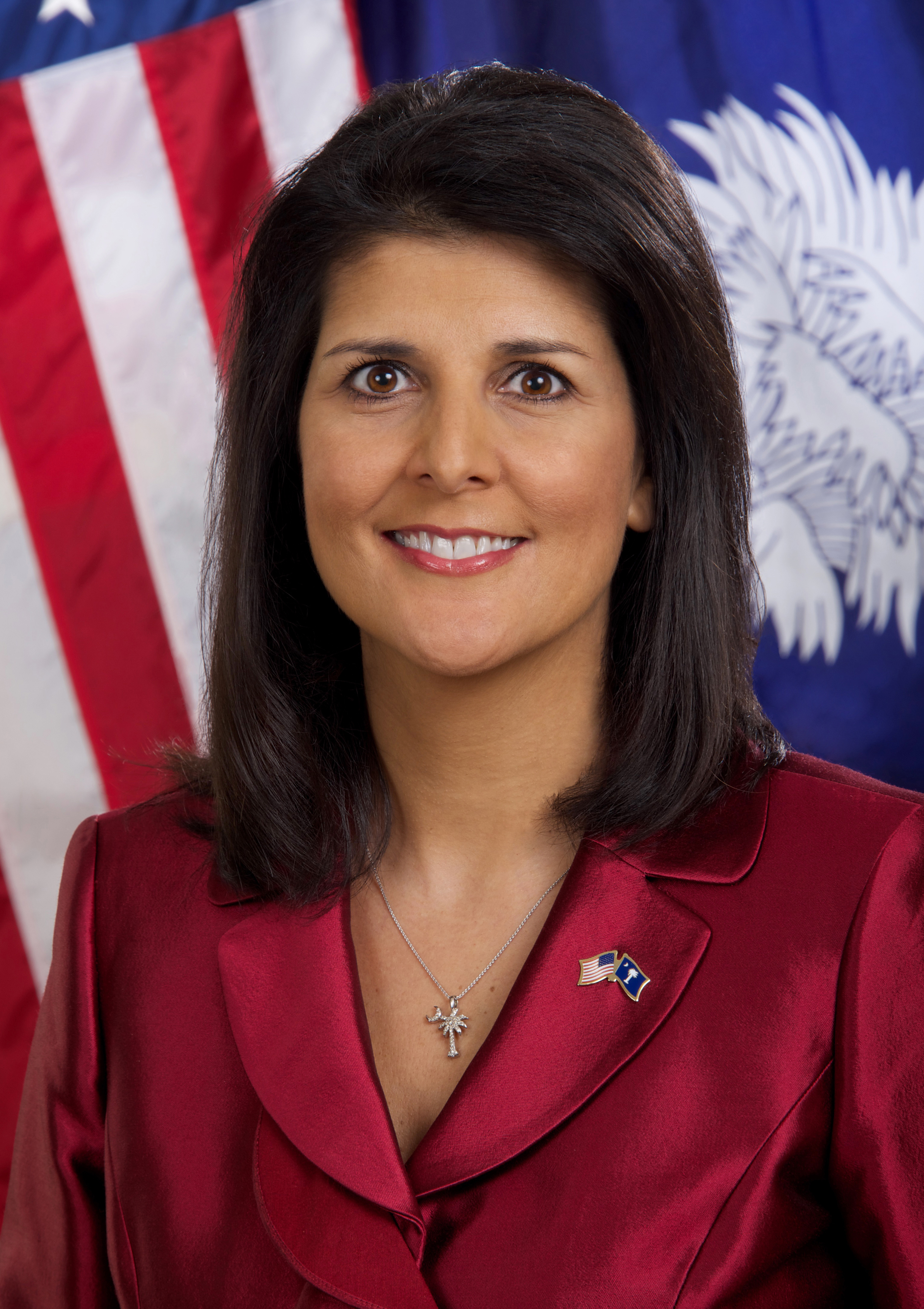
Nikki Haley
Governor of South Carolina 2011–2017
Endorsed Marco Rubio, then Ted Cruz

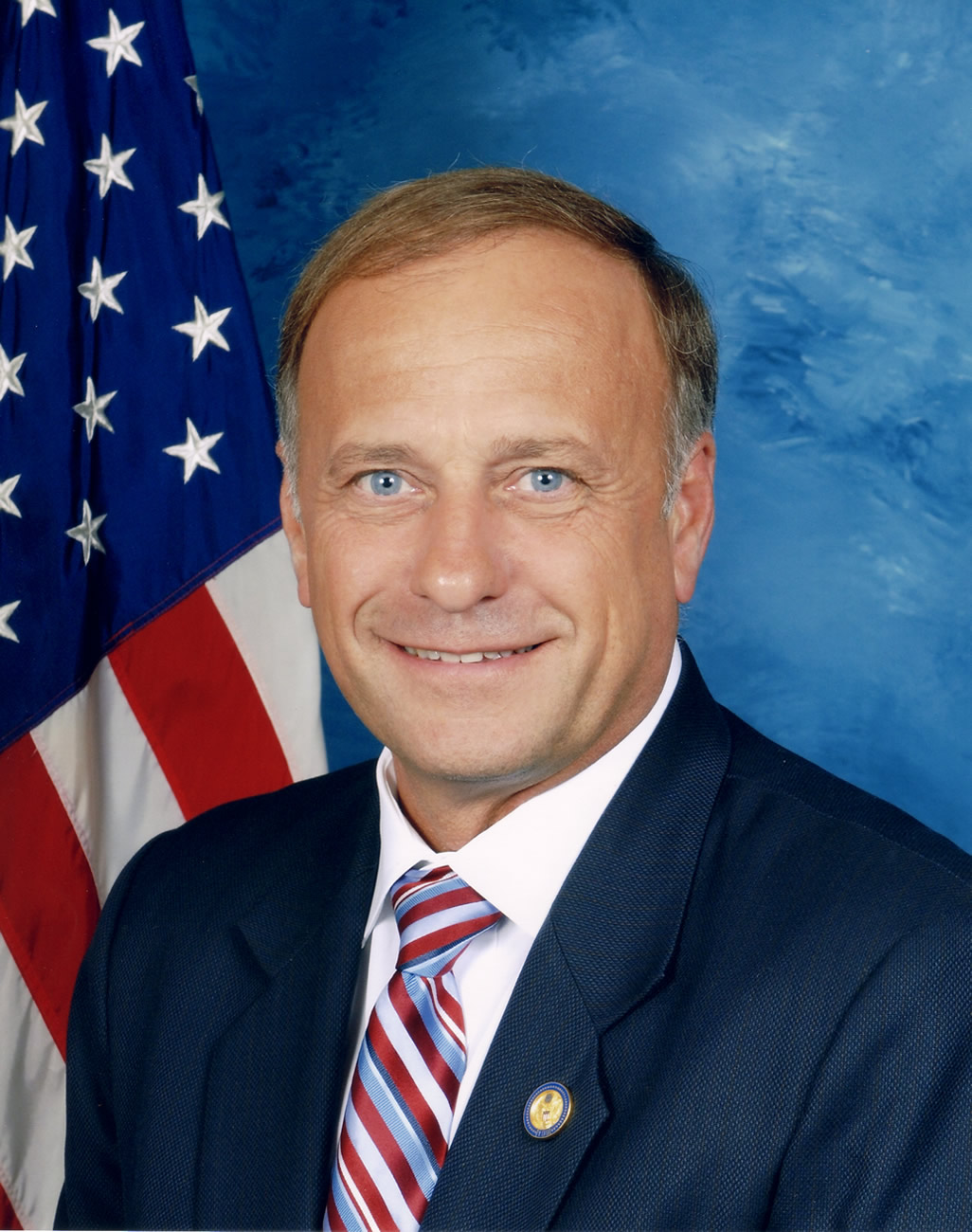
Steve King
U.S. Representative from Iowa 2003–2021
Endorsed Ted Cruz

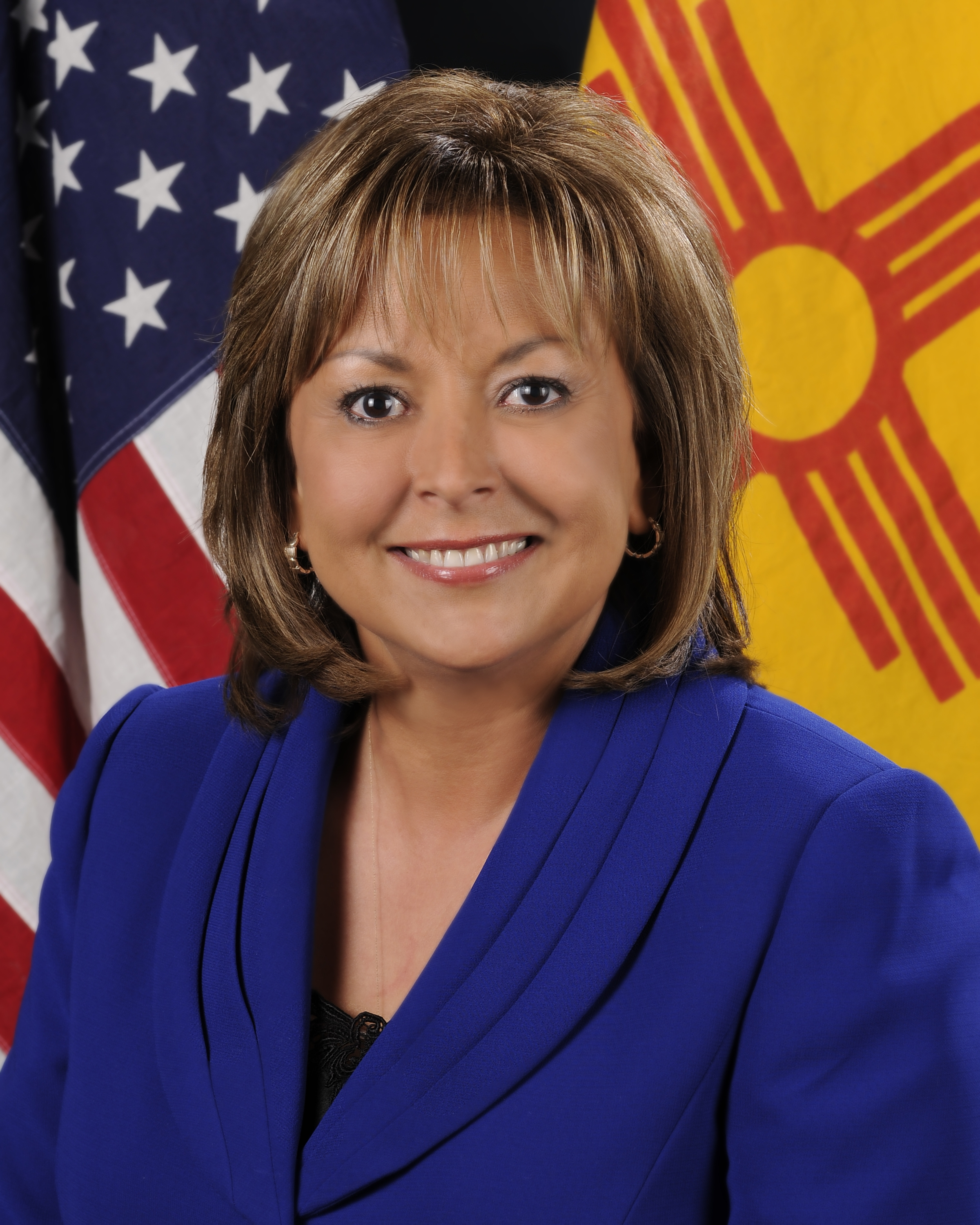
Susana Martinez
Governor of New Mexico 2011–2019;
Endorsed Marco Rubio

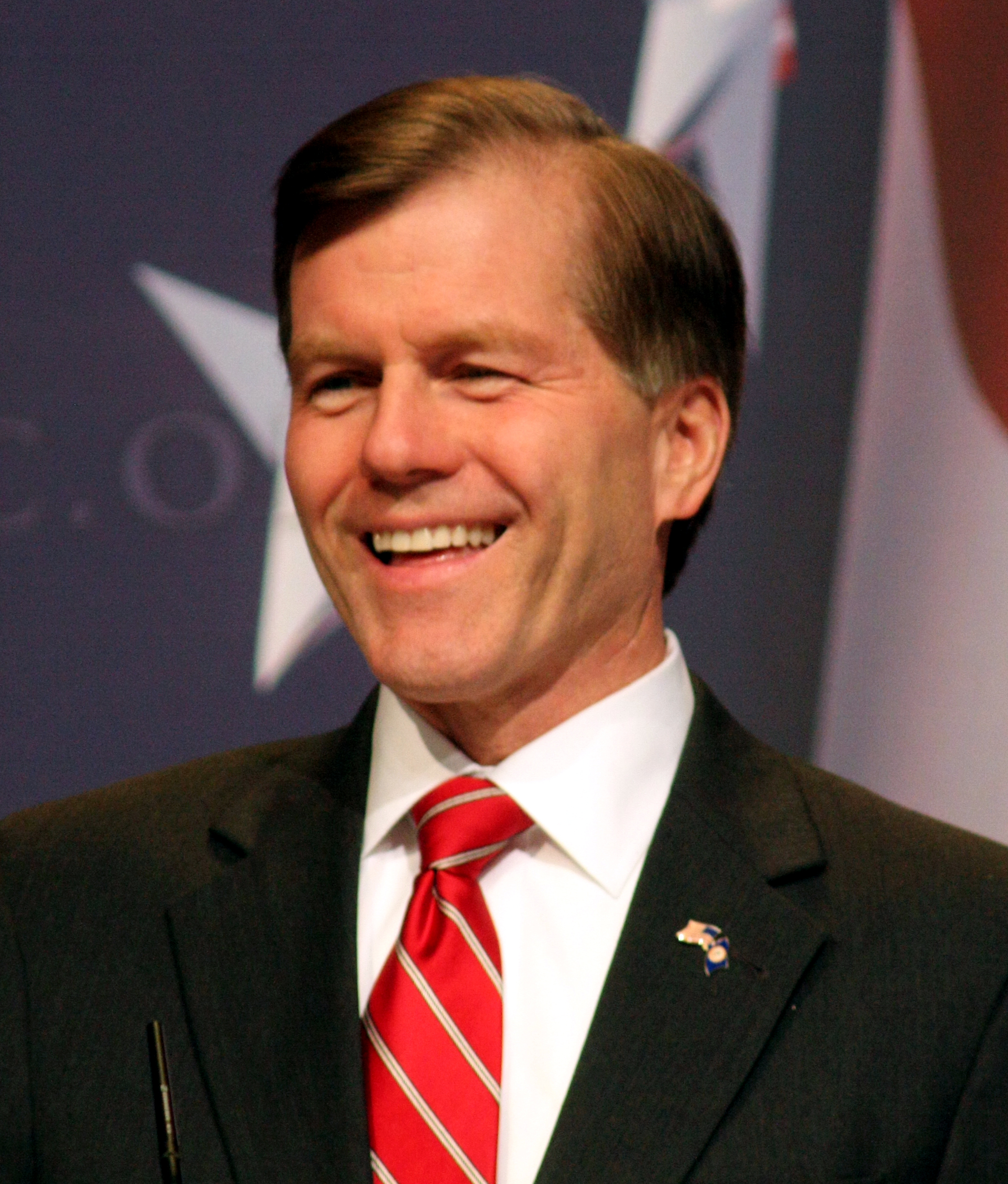
Bob McDonnell
Governor of Virginia 2010–14

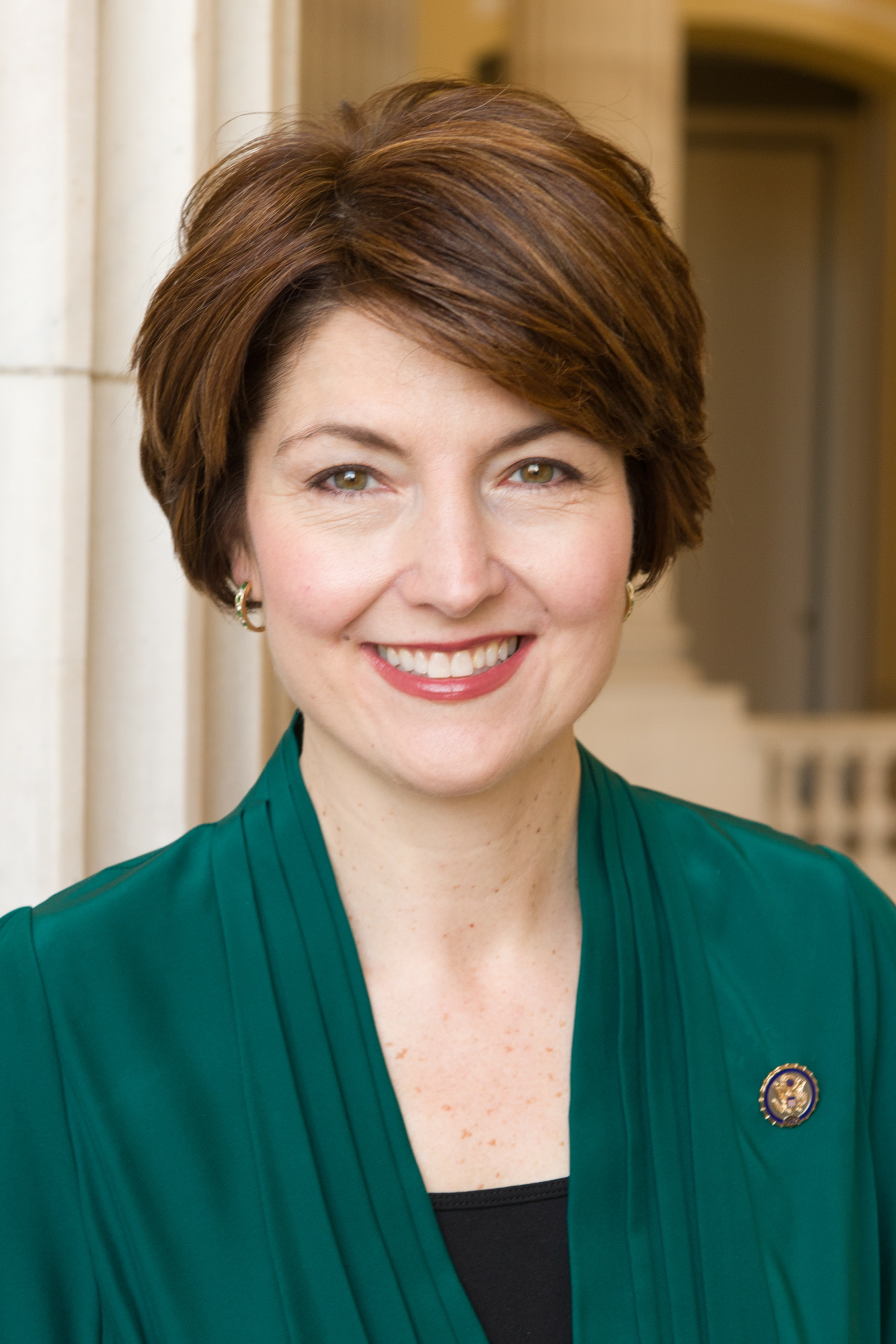
Cathy McMorris Rodgers
U.S. Representative from Washington 2005–2025

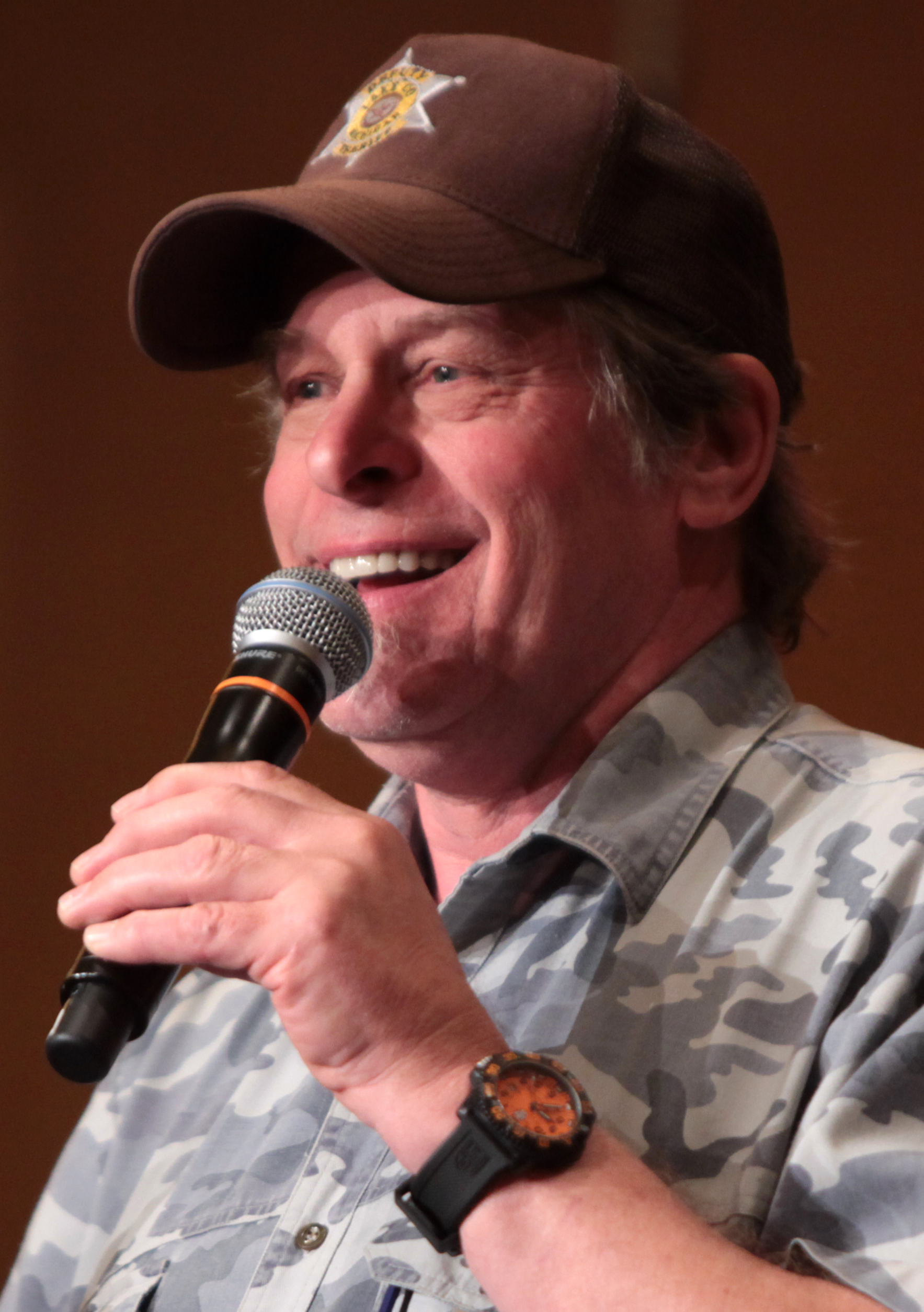
Ted Nugent
musician and civil liberties activist from Michigan
Endorsed Donald Trump

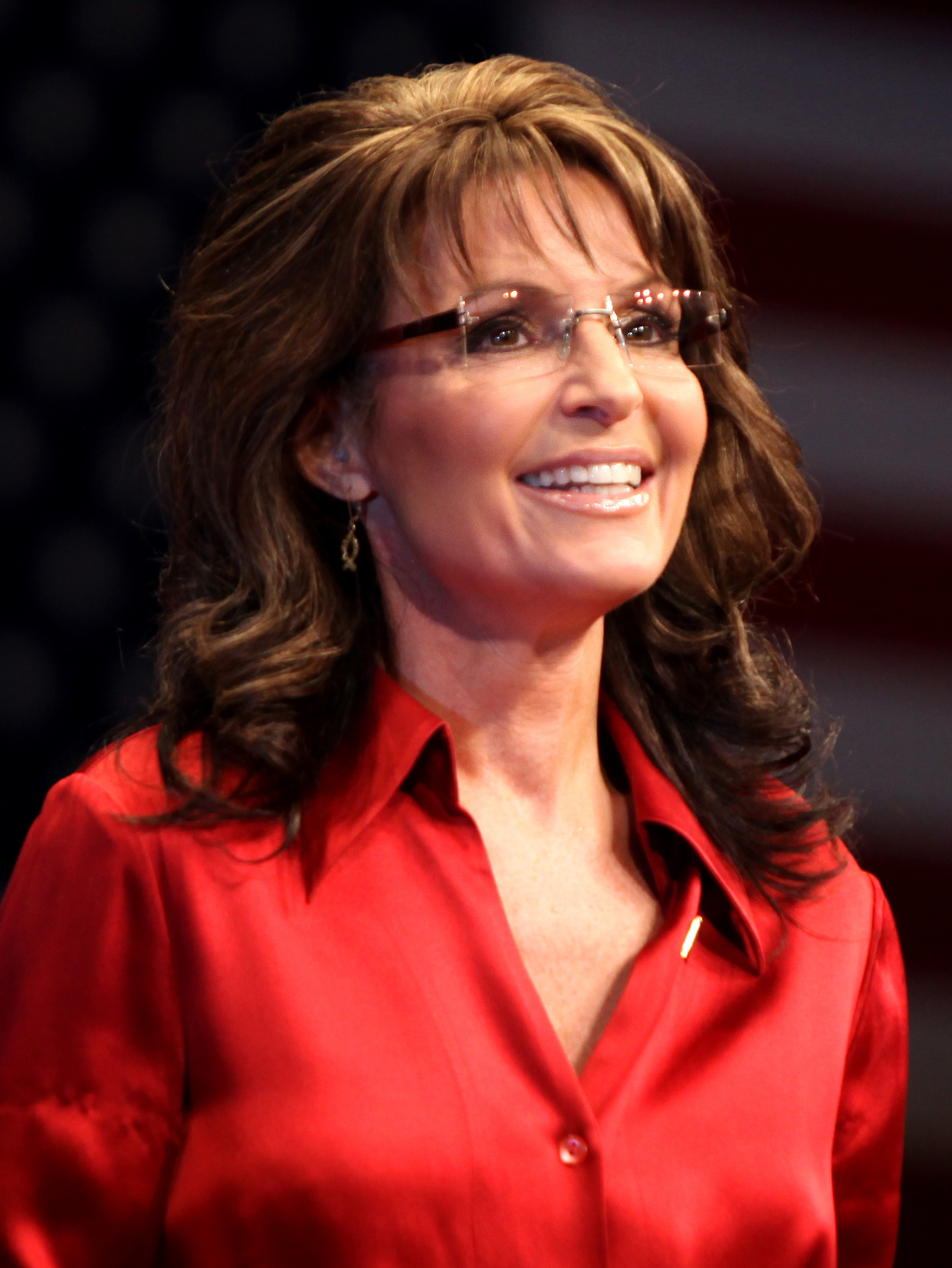
Sarah Palin
Governor of Alaska 2006–09; 2008 vice-presidential nominee
Endorsed Donald Trump

Mike Rogers
U.S. Representative from Michigan 2001–15

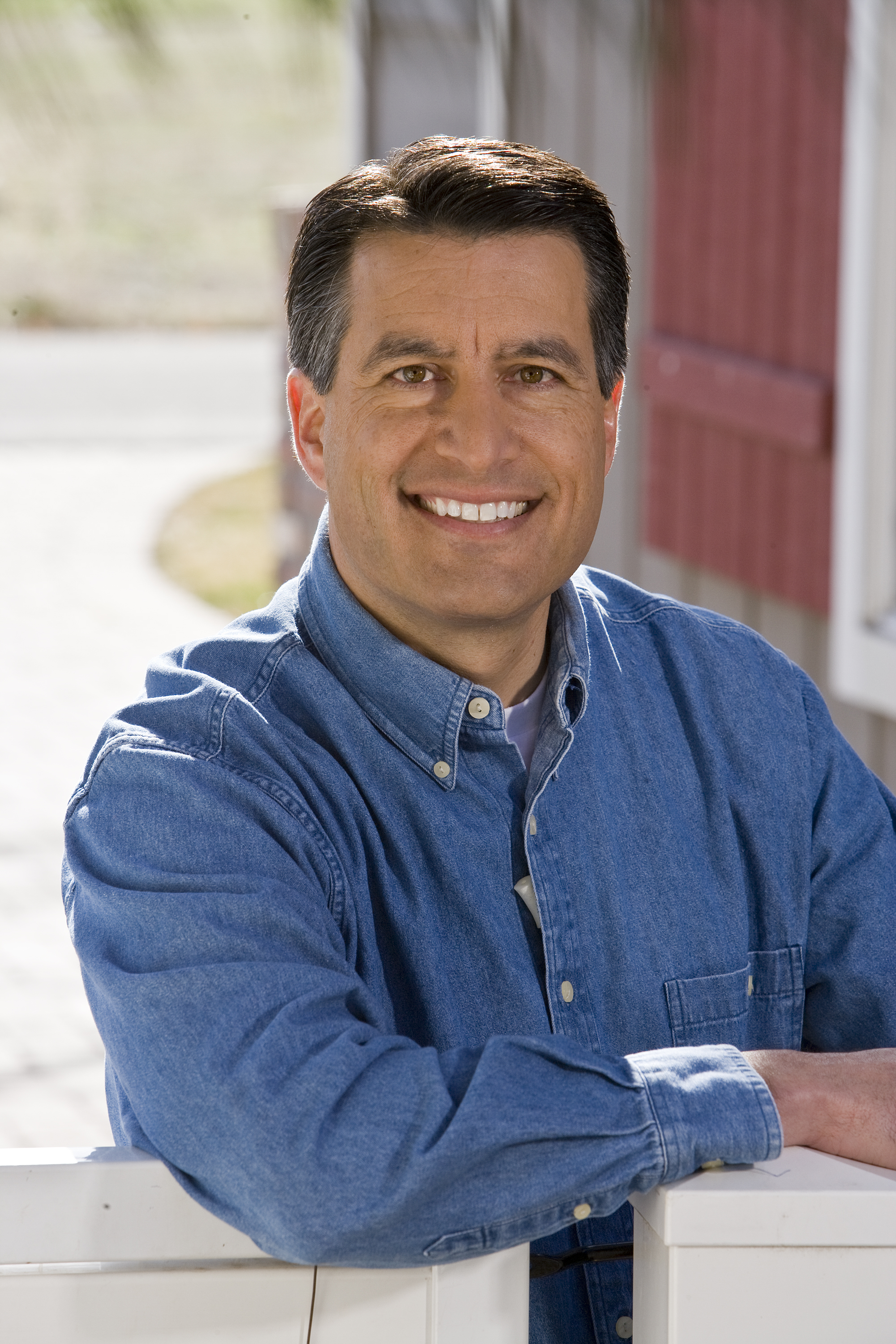
Brian Sandoval
Governor of Nevada 2011–2019
Endorsed John Kasich

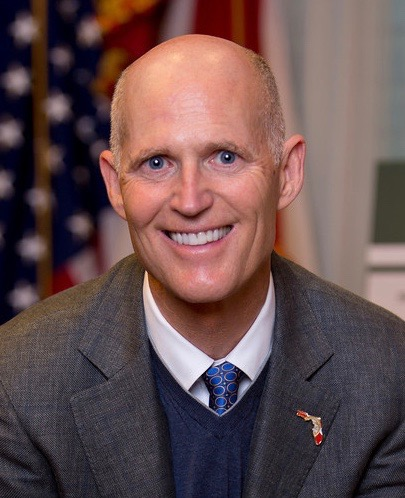
Rick Scott
Governor of Florida 2011–2019
Endorsed Donald Trump

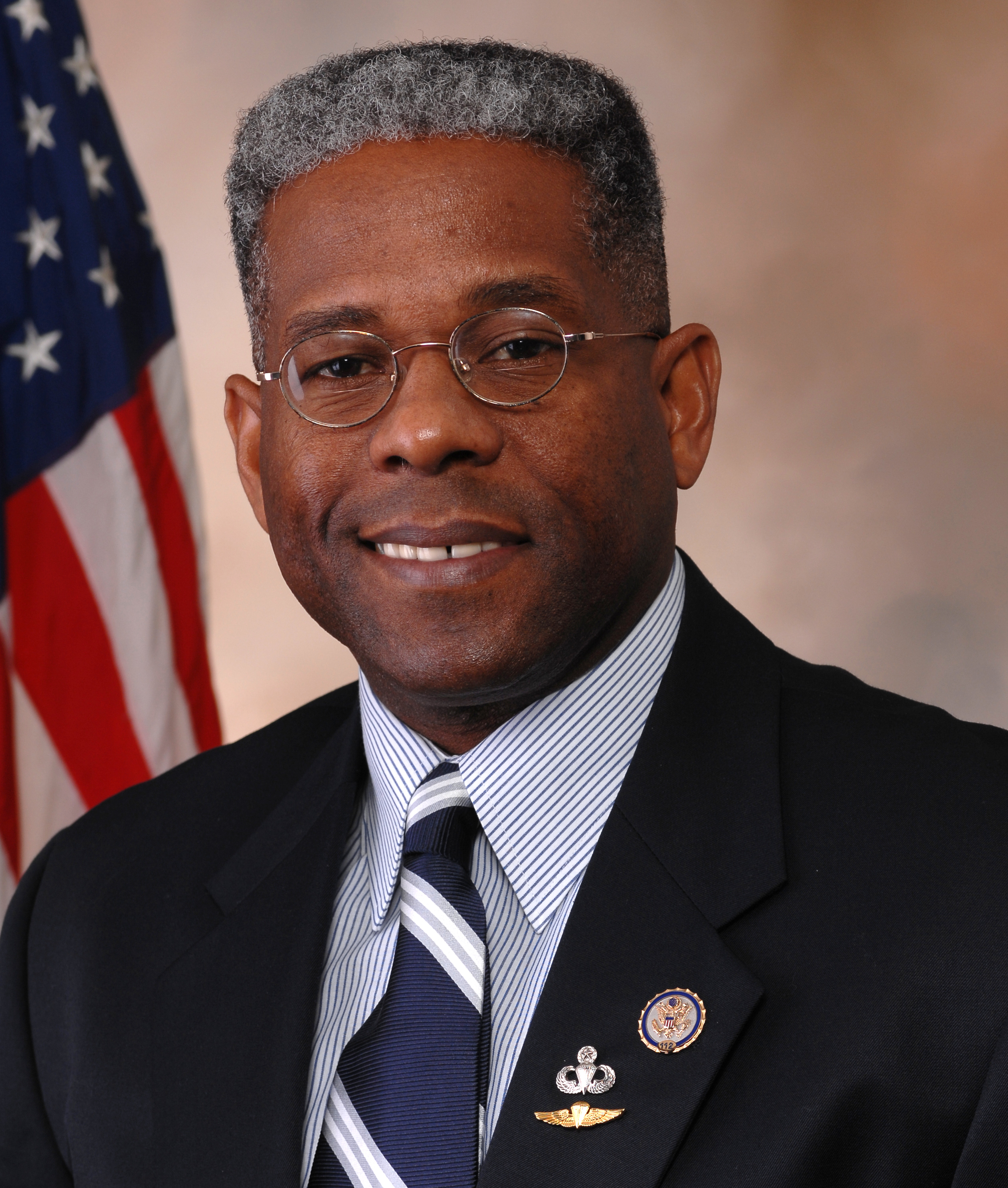
Allen West
U.S. Representative from Florida 2011–13

=== Declined ===
Individuals listed in this section were the focus of media speculation as being possible 2016 presidential candidates but publicly, and unequivocally, ruled out presidential bids in 2016.

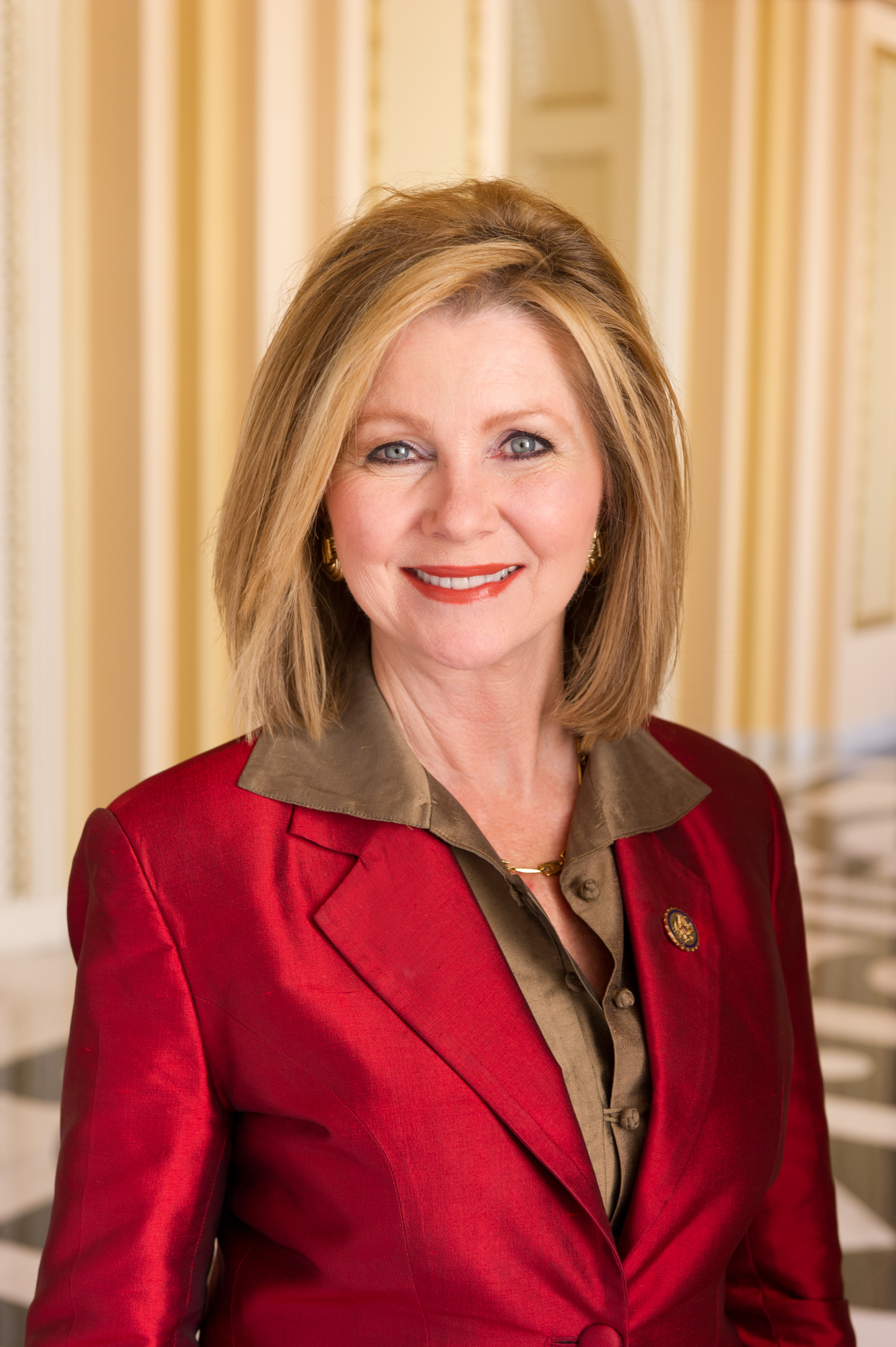
Marsha Blackburn
U.S. Representative from Tennessee 2003–2019

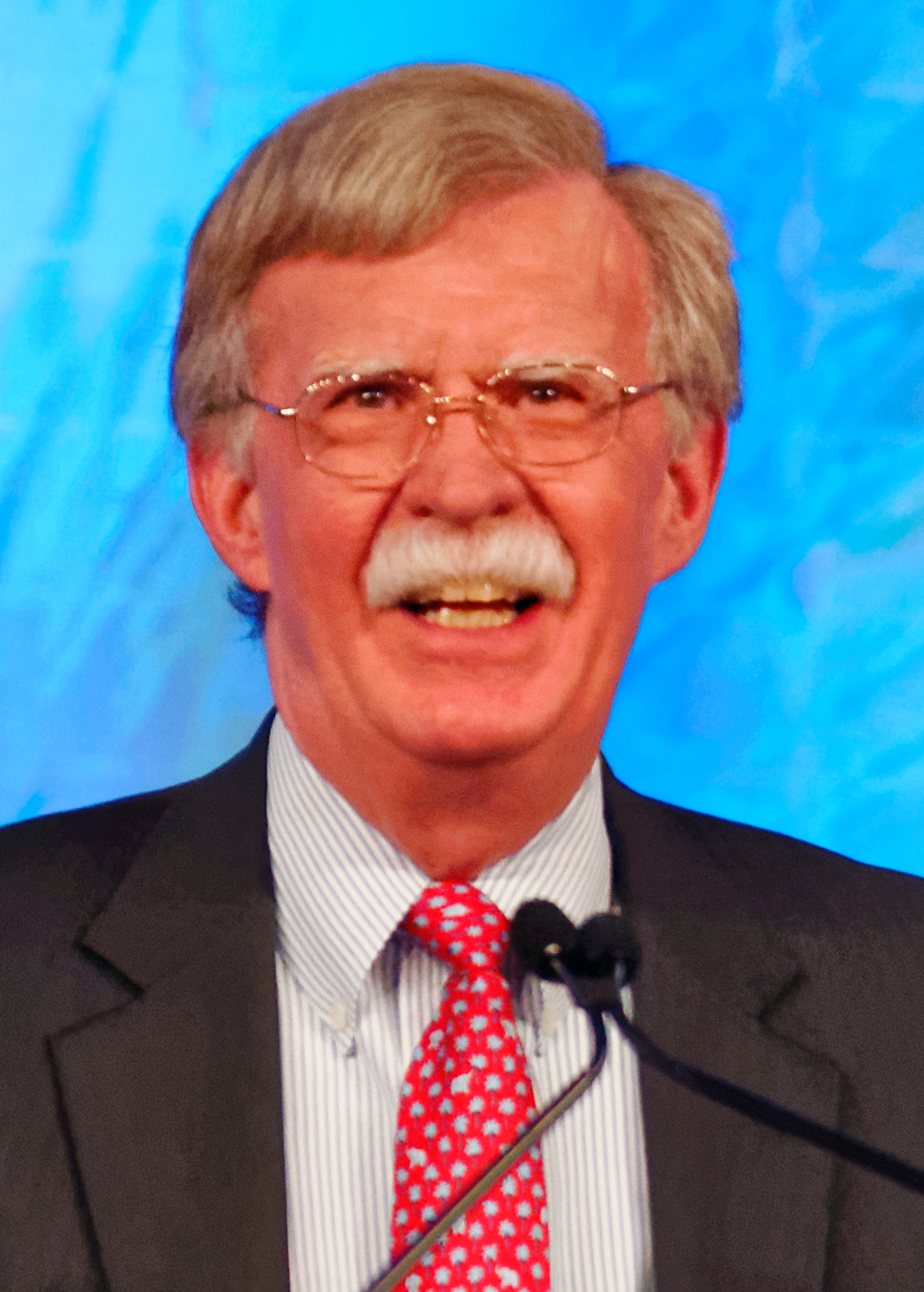
John Bolton
U.S. Ambassador to the United Nations 2005–06

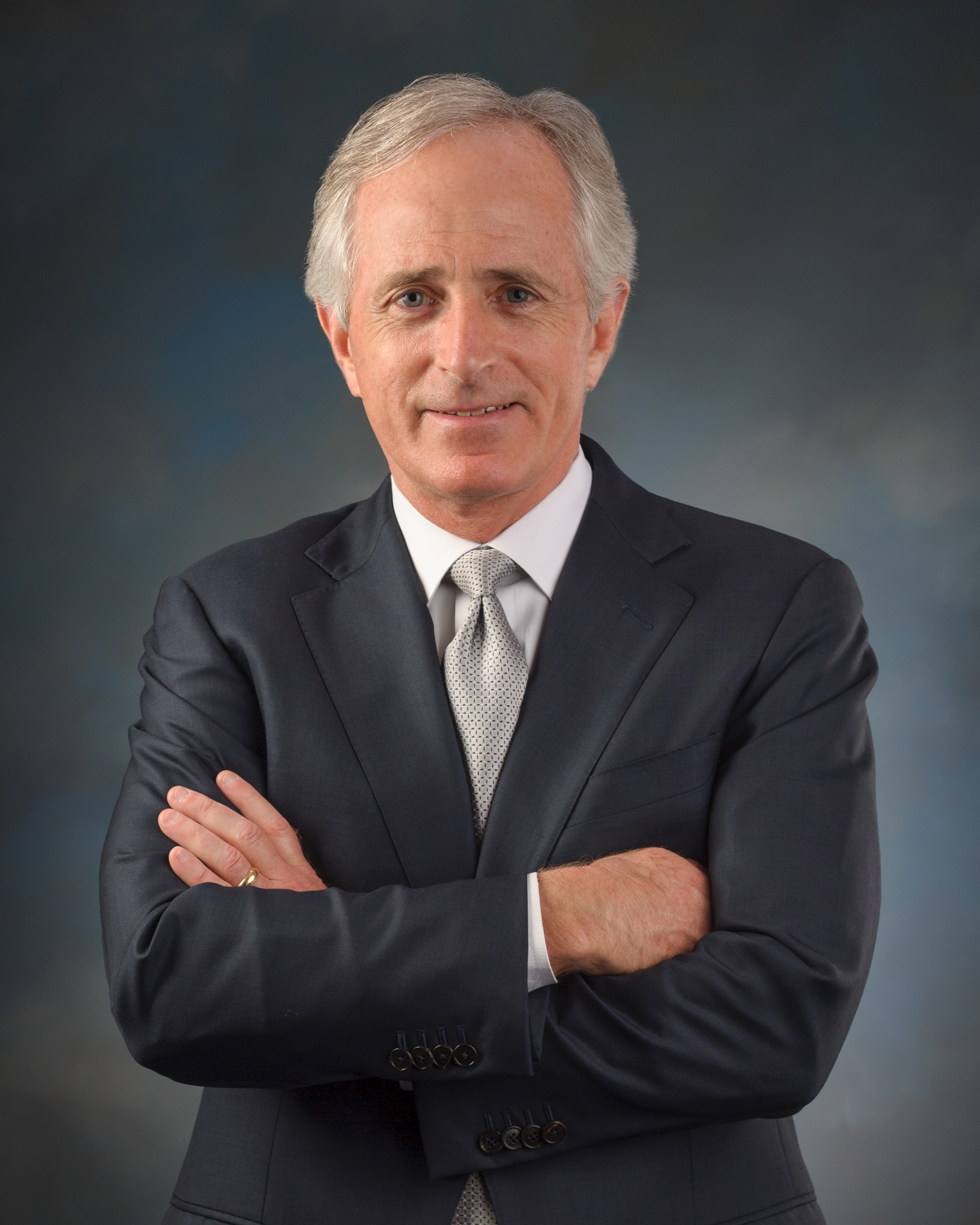
Bob Corker
U.S. Senator from Tennessee 2007–2019

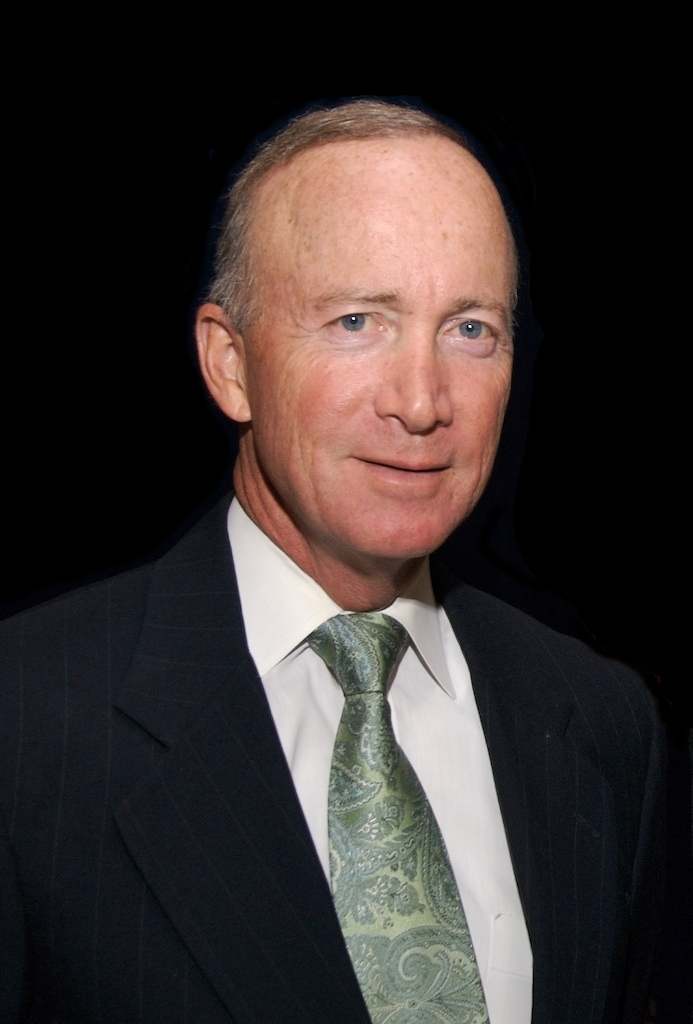
Mitch Daniels
Governor of Indiana 2005–13

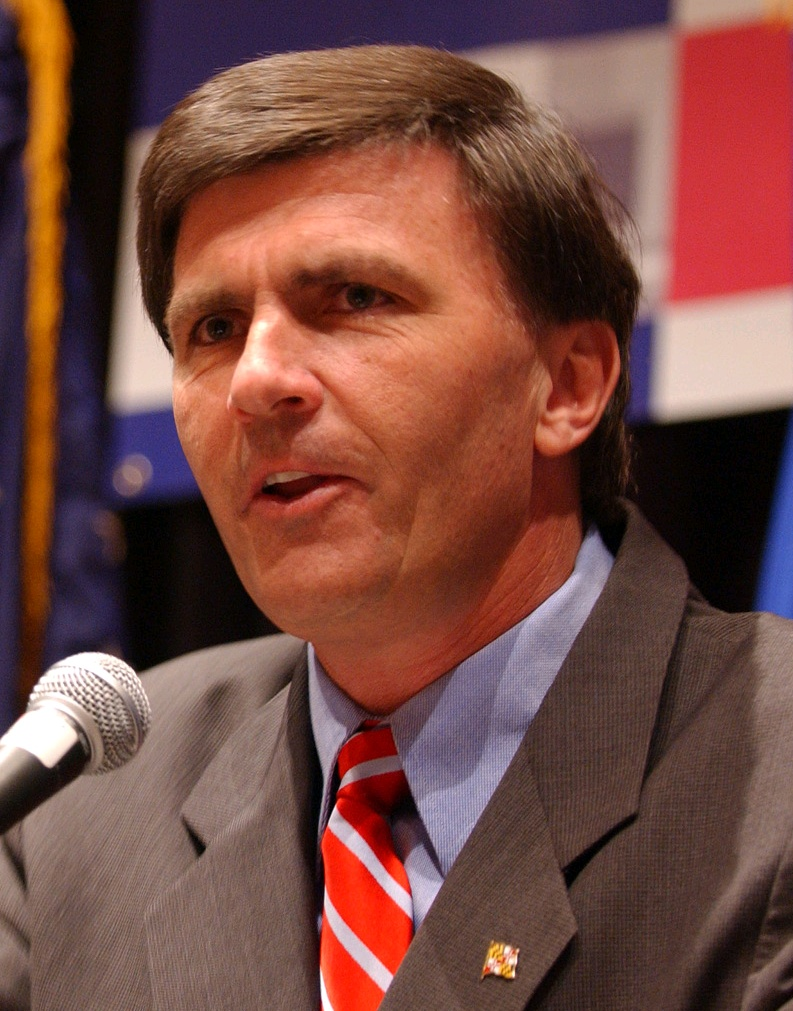
Bob Ehrlich
Governor of Maryland 2003–07

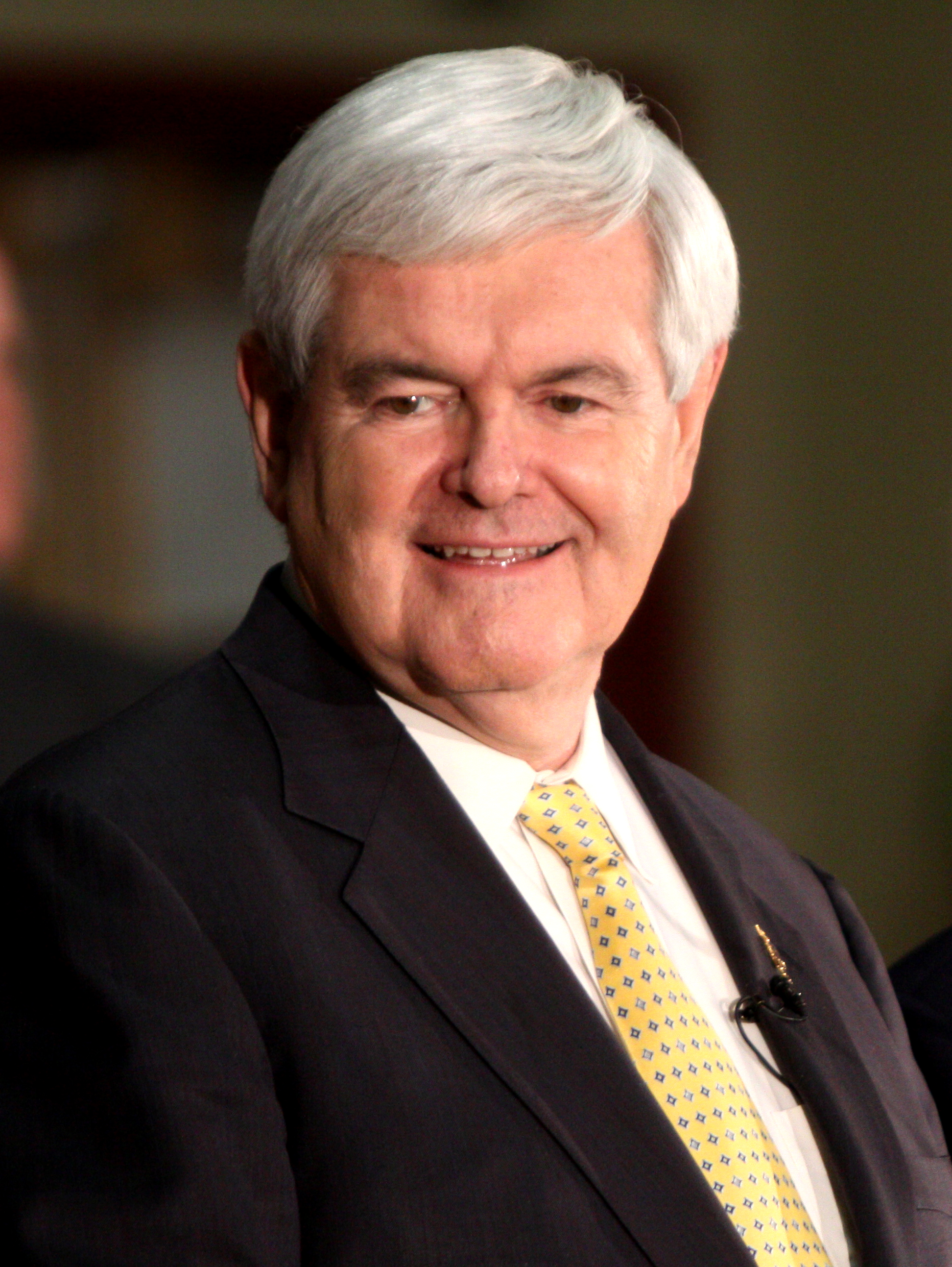
Newt Gingrich
Speaker of the House of Representatives 1995–99; presidential candidate in 2012

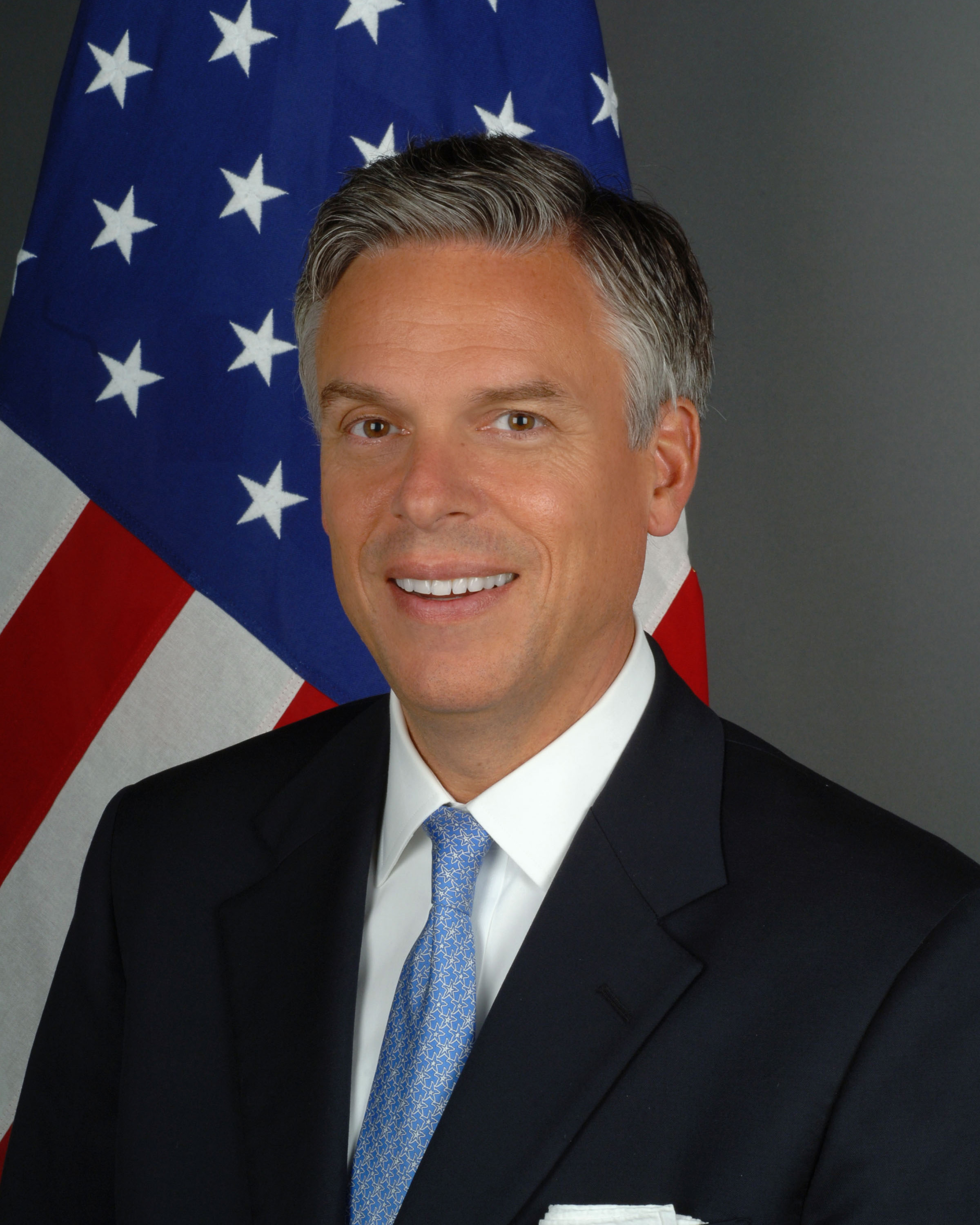
Jon Huntsman Jr.
United States Ambassador to China 2009–11; Governor of Utah 2005–09; presidential candidate in 2012

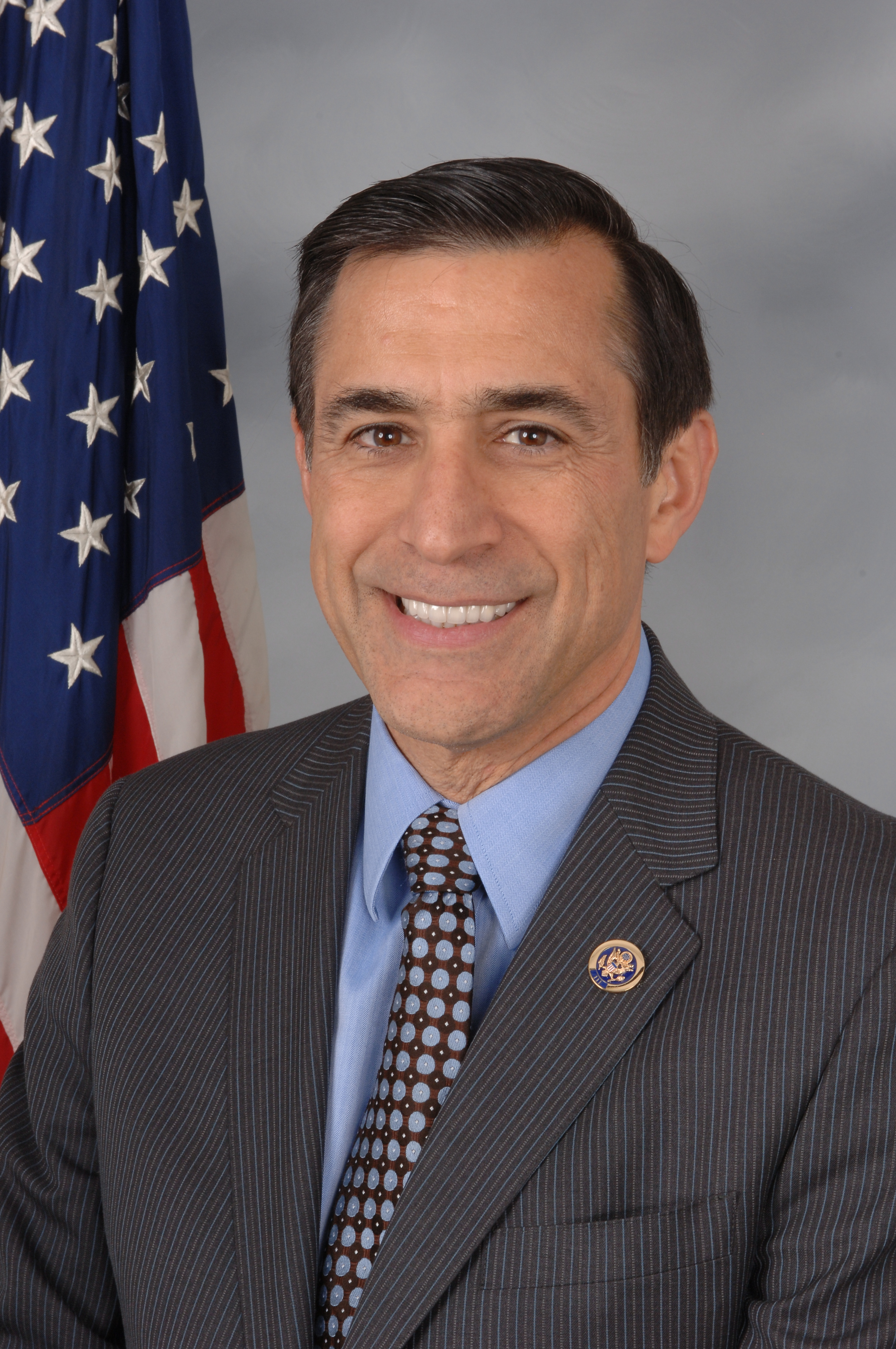
Darrell Issa
U.S. Representative from California since 2021 and from 2001 to 2019

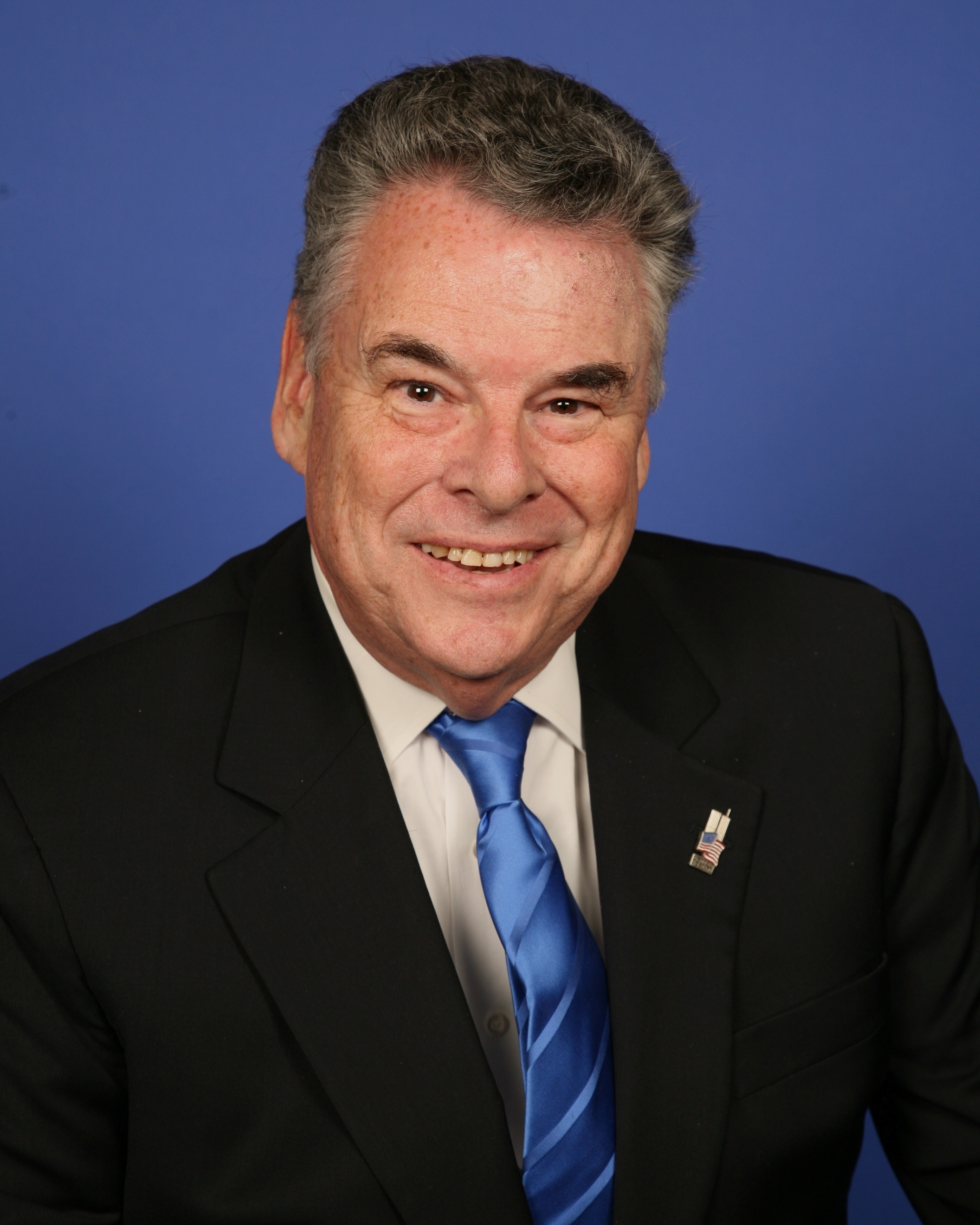
Peter King
U.S. Representative from New York 1993-2021

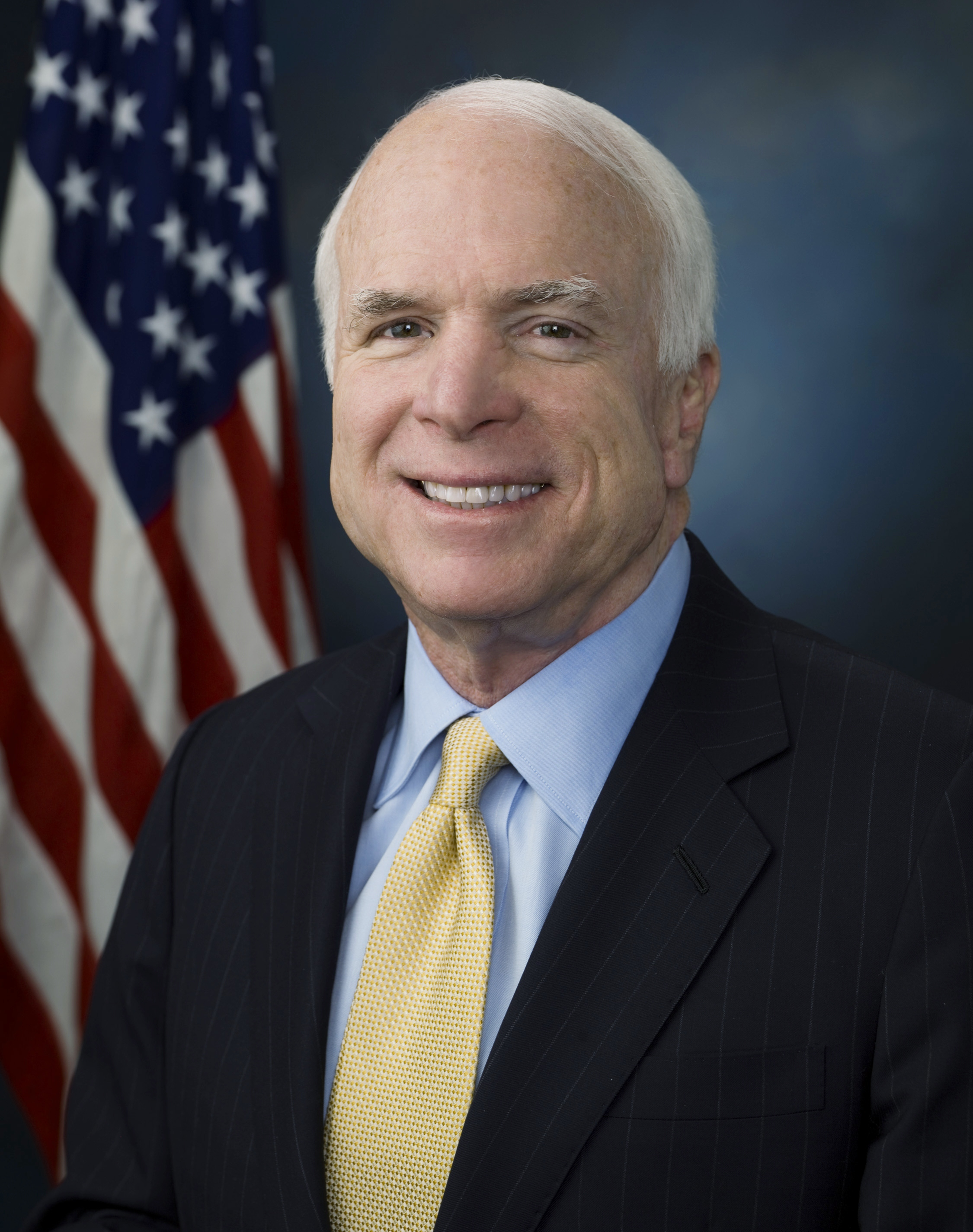
John McCain
U.S. Senator from Arizona 1987–2018; presidential candidate in 2000; presidential nominee in 2008
Endorsed Lindsey Graham

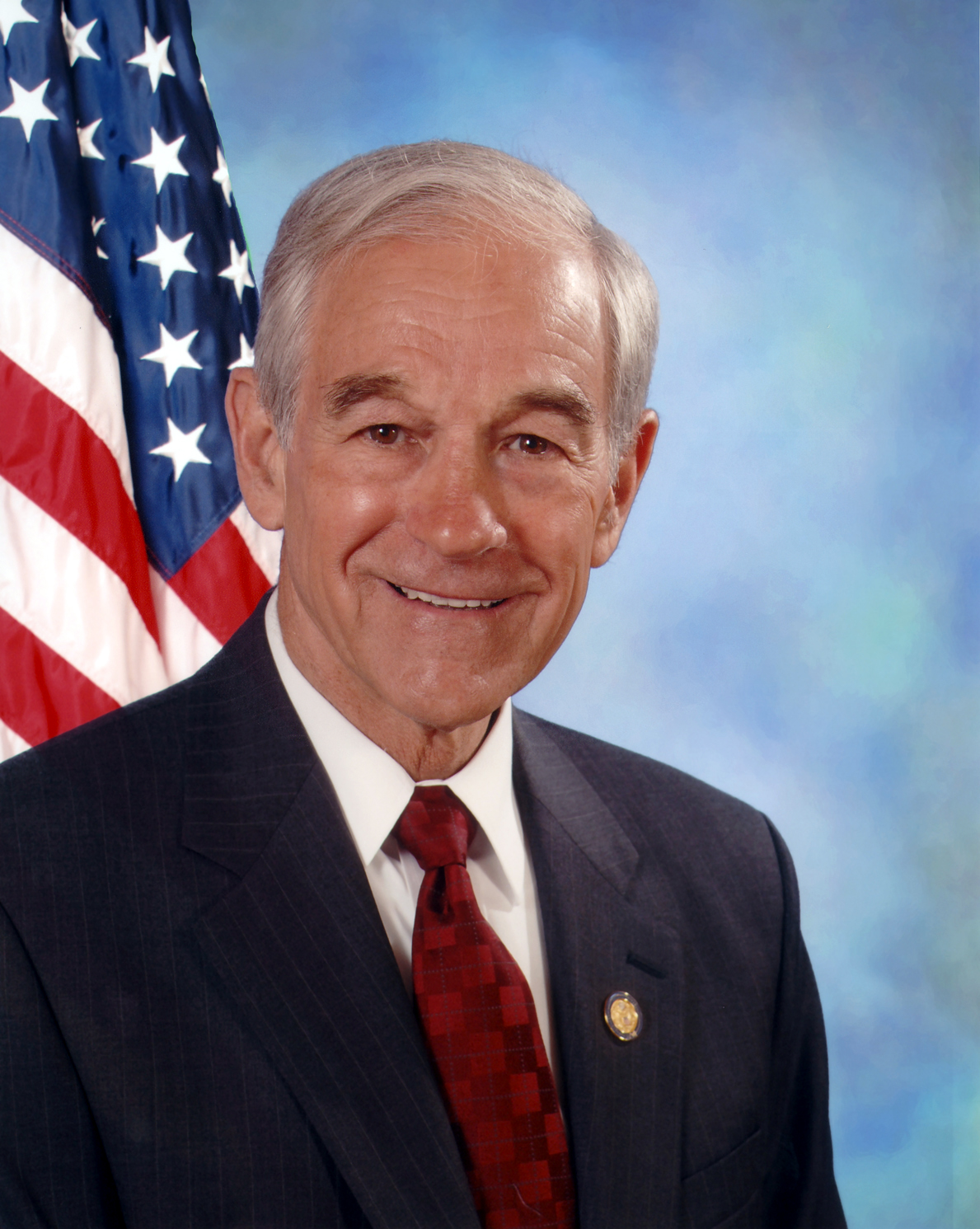
Ron Paul
U.S. Representative from Texas 1976–77, 1979–85 and 1997–2013, presidential candidate in 1988, in 2008, and in 2012
Endorsed Rand Paul

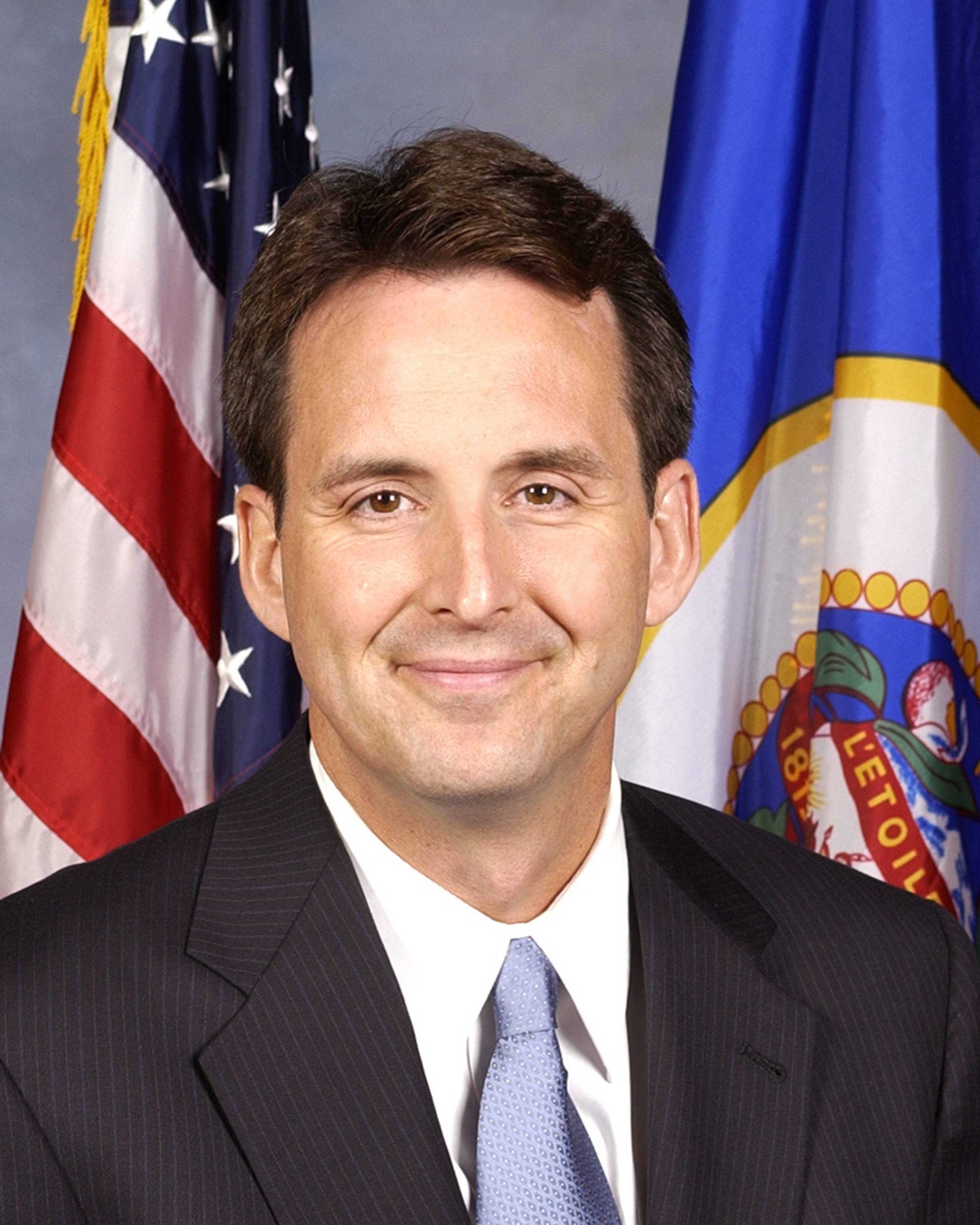
Tim Pawlenty
Governor of Minnesota 2003–11, presidential candidate in 2012
Endorsed Marco Rubio

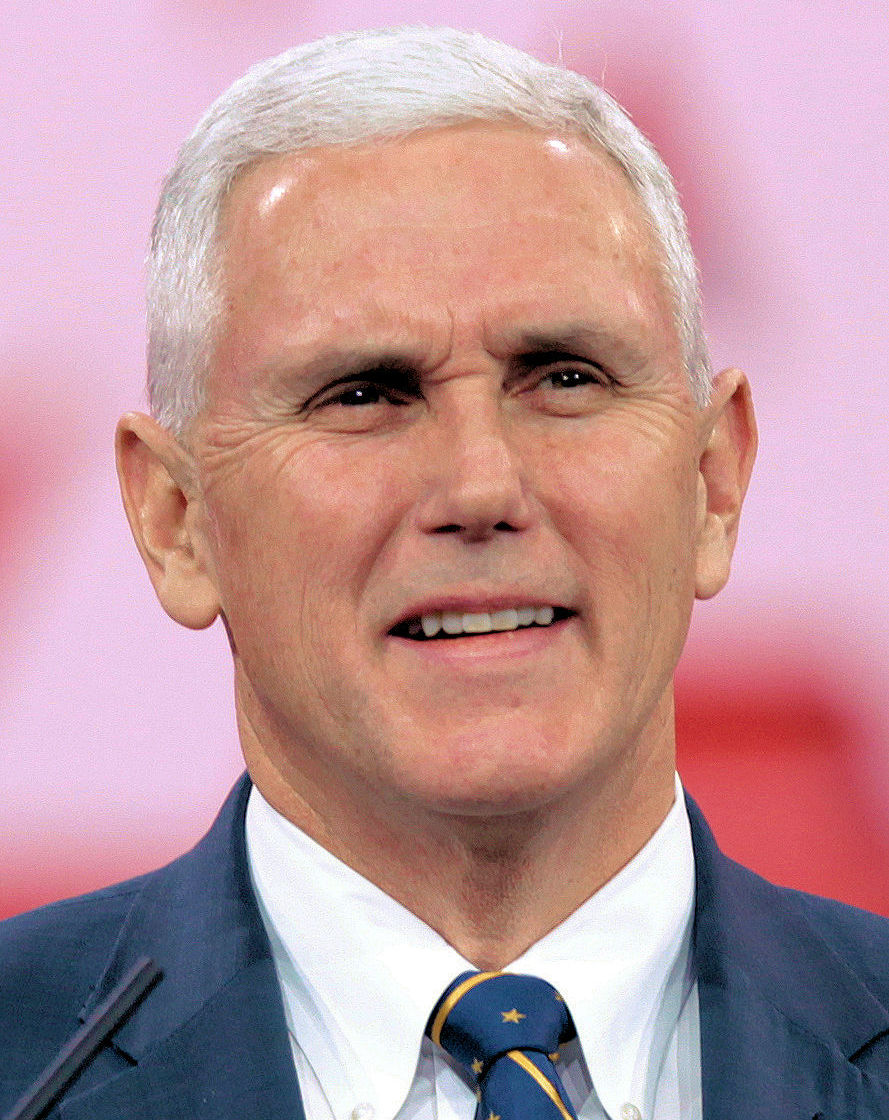
Mike Pence
Governor of Indiana 2013–2017 vice presidential nominee for Donald Trump in 2016

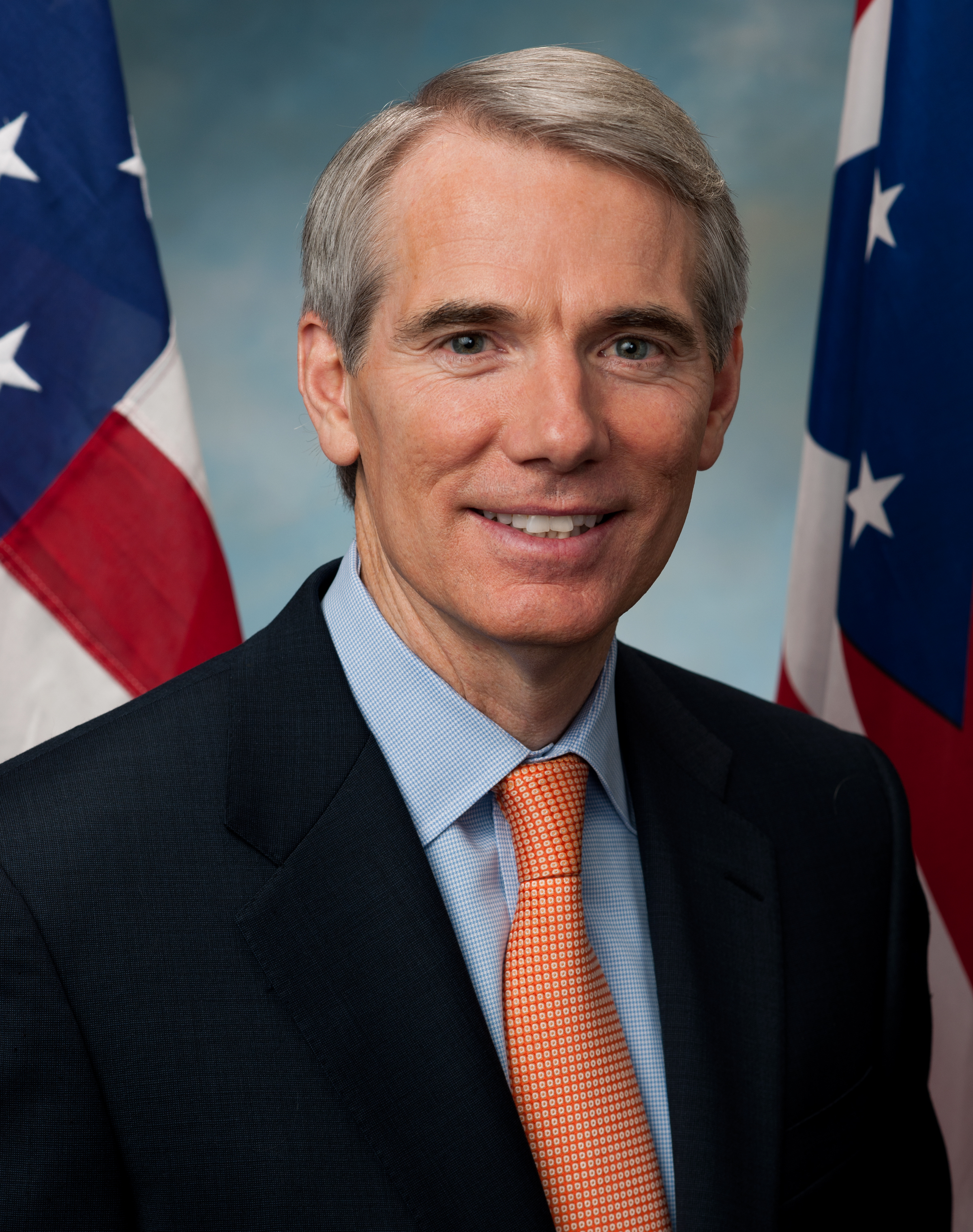
Rob Portman
U.S. Senator from Ohio 2011-2023
Endorsed John Kasich

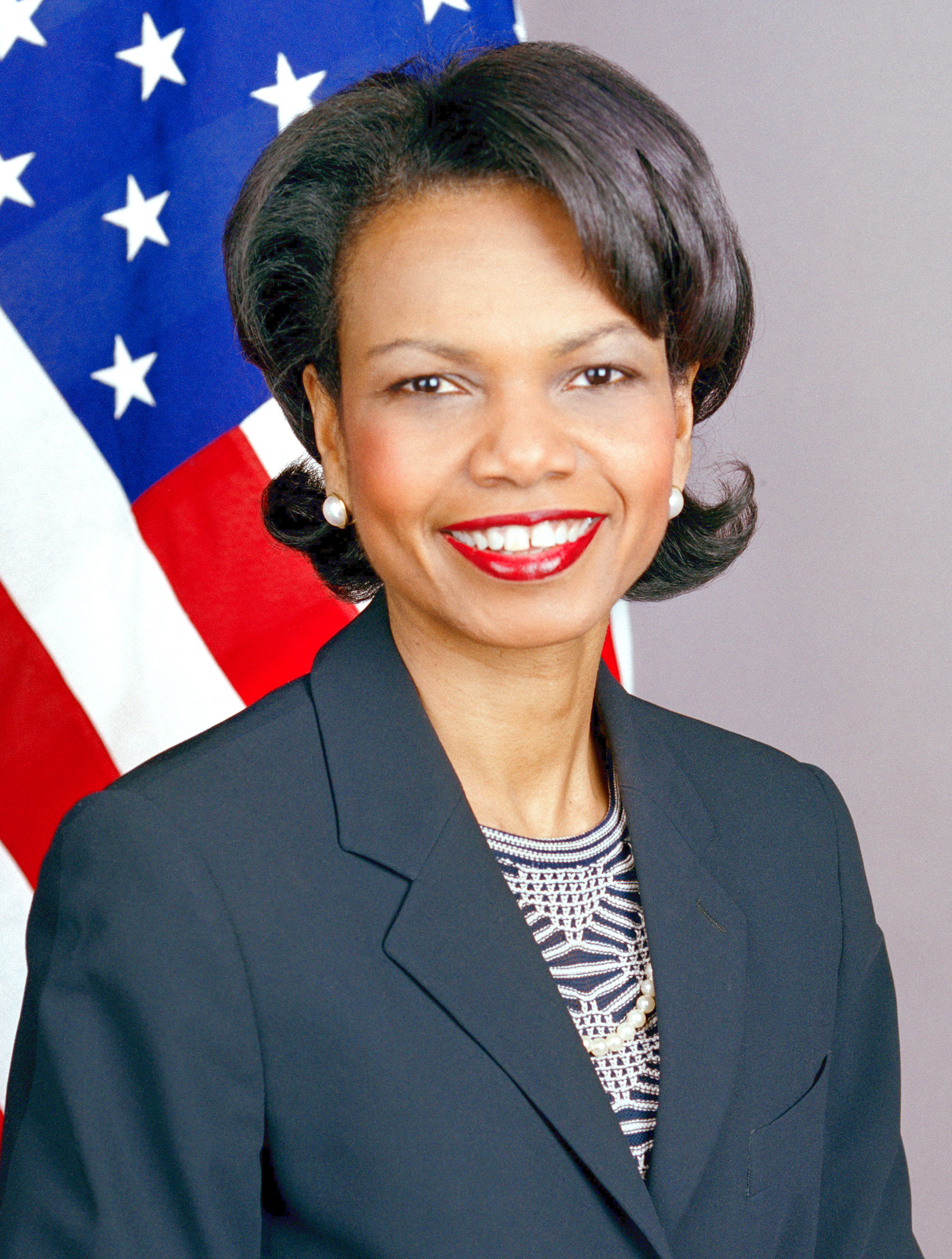
Condoleezza Rice
United States Secretary of State 2005–09

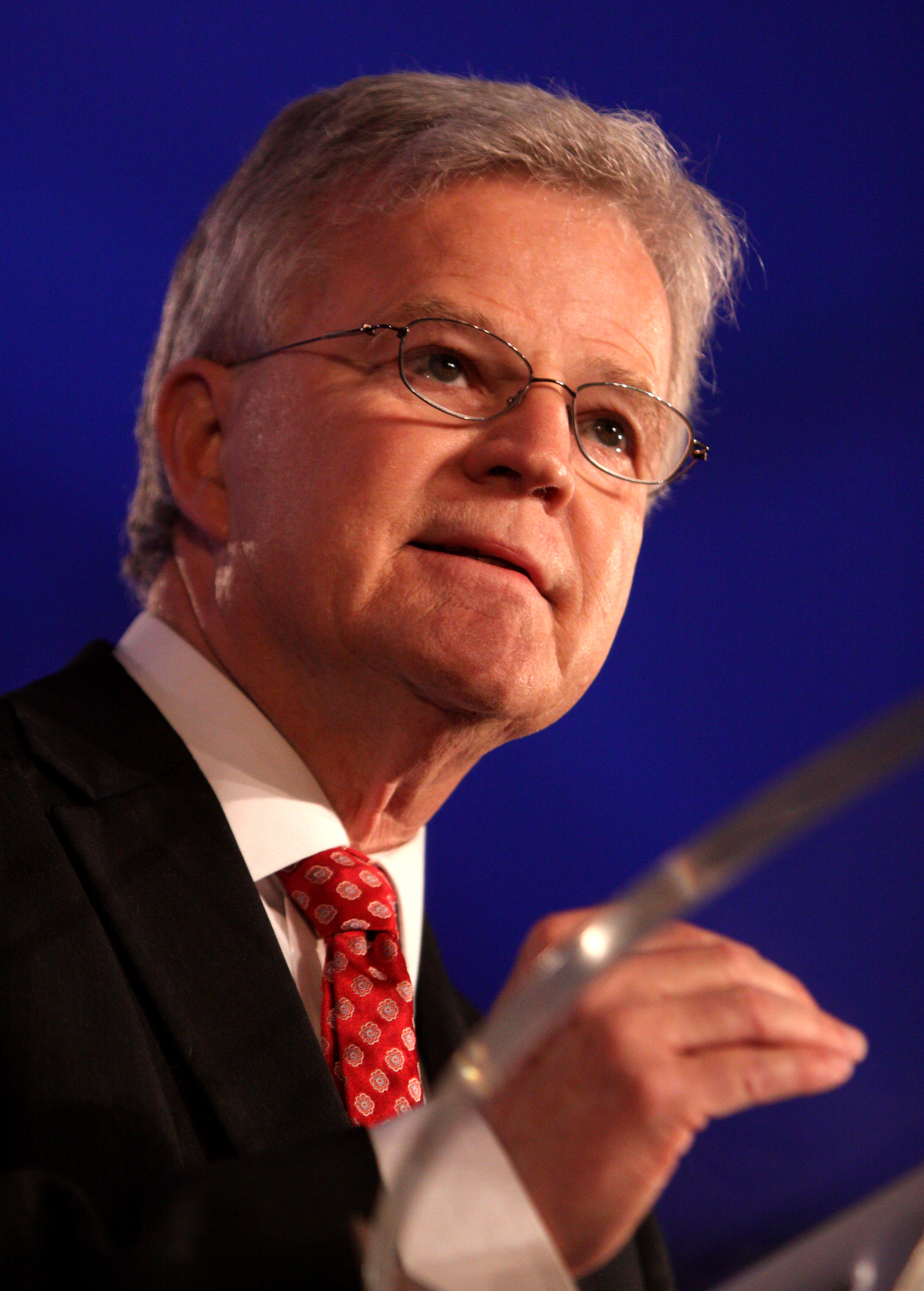
Buddy Roemer
Governor of Louisiana 1988–92; presidential candidate in 2012

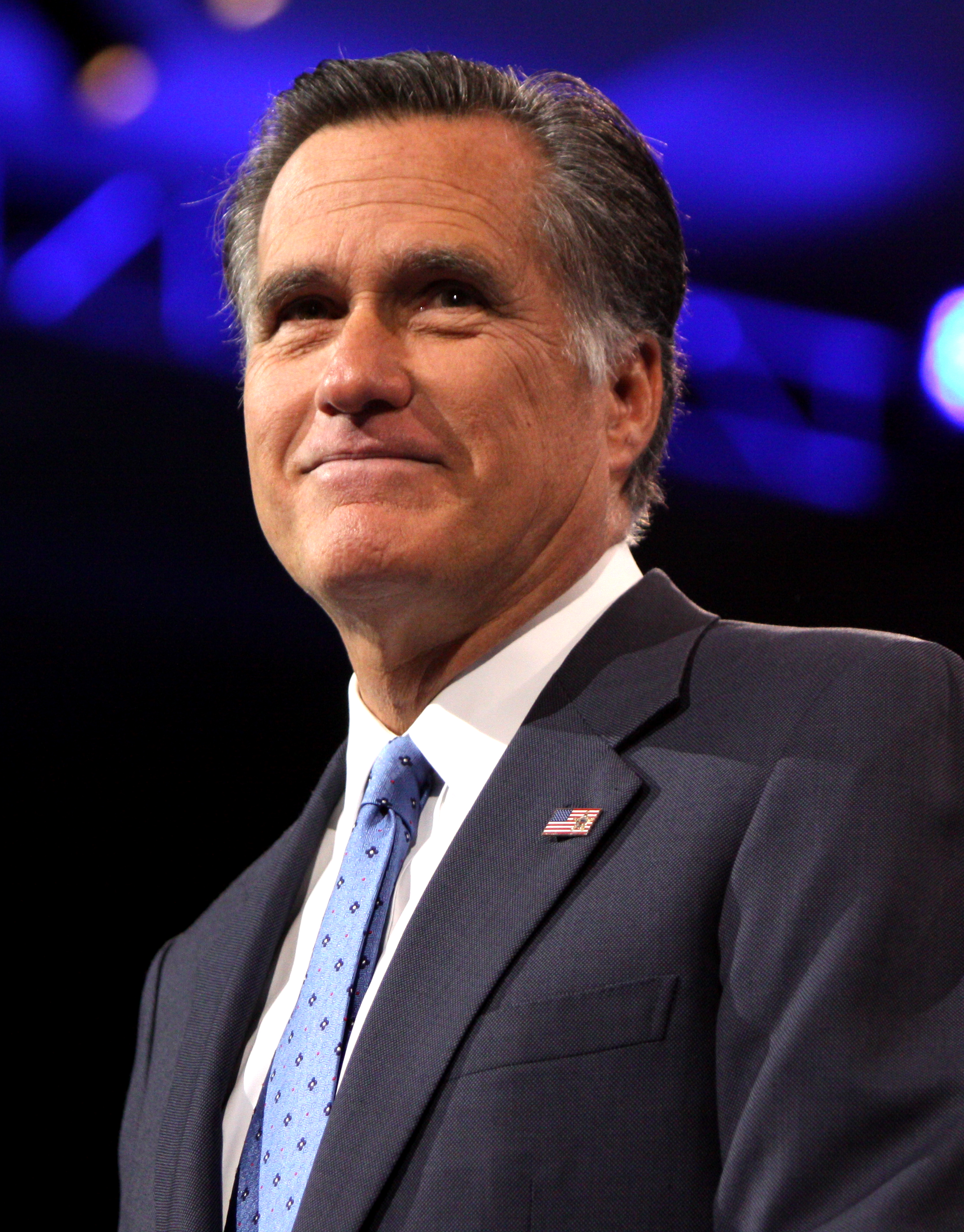
Mitt Romney
Governor of Massachusetts 2003–07; presidential candidate in 2008; presidential nominee in 2012

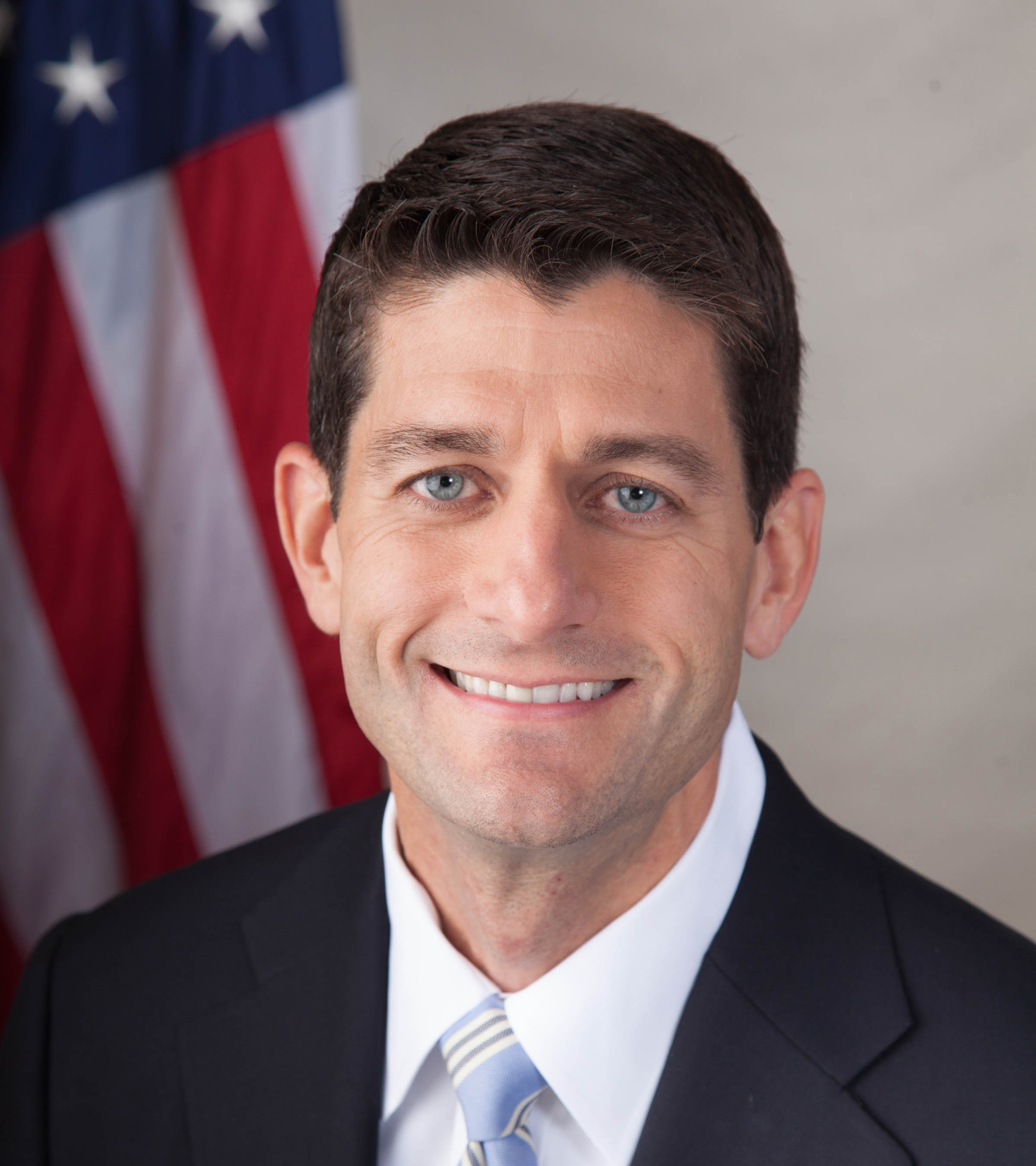
Paul Ryan
U.S. Representative from Wisconsin 1999–2019, Speaker of the United States House of Representatives 2015–19, vice presidential nominee in 2012

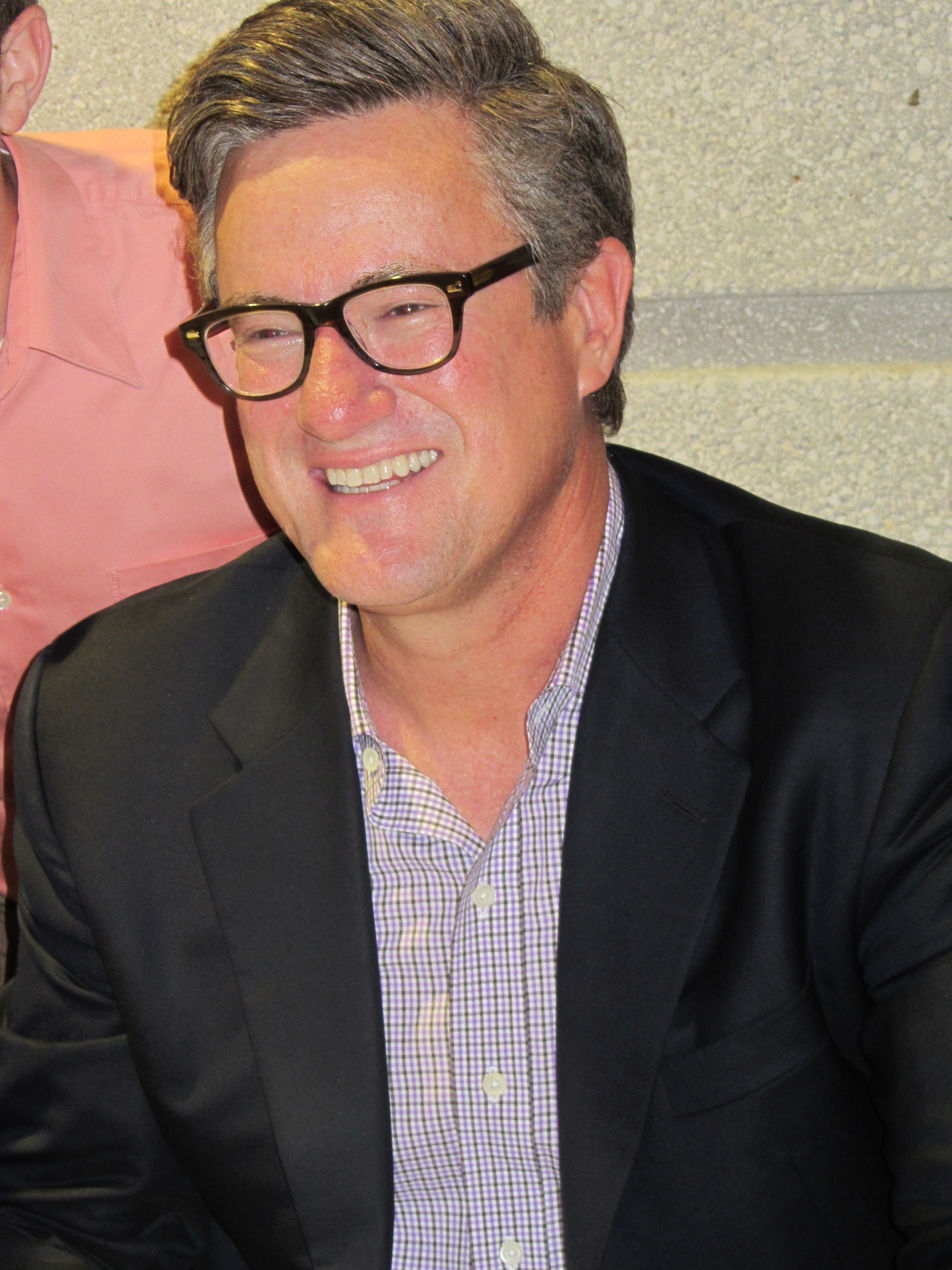
Joe Scarborough
cable news and talk radio host, U.S. Representative from Florida 1995–2001
Endorsed Jeb Bush

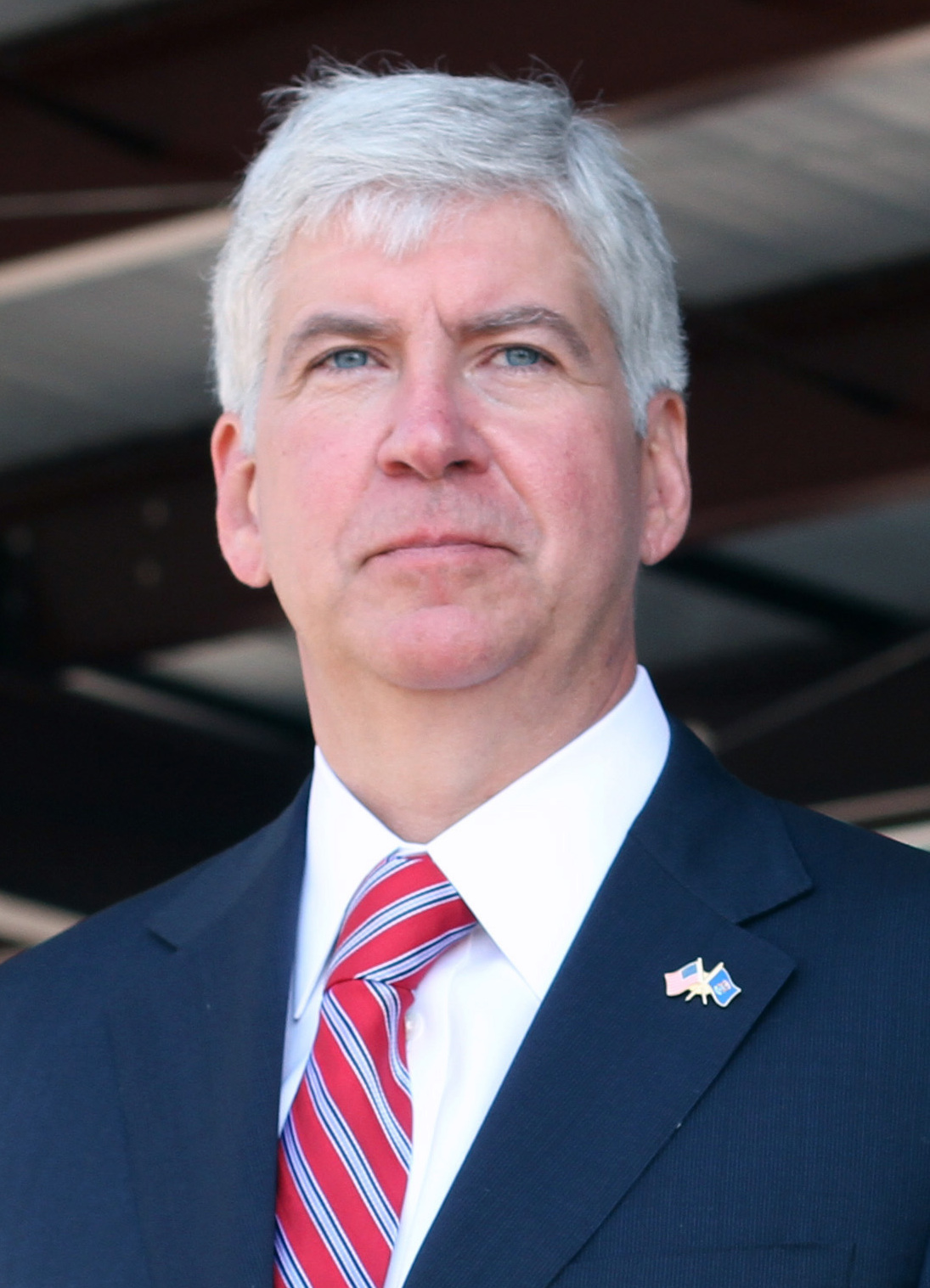
Rick Snyder
Governor of Michigan 2011–2019

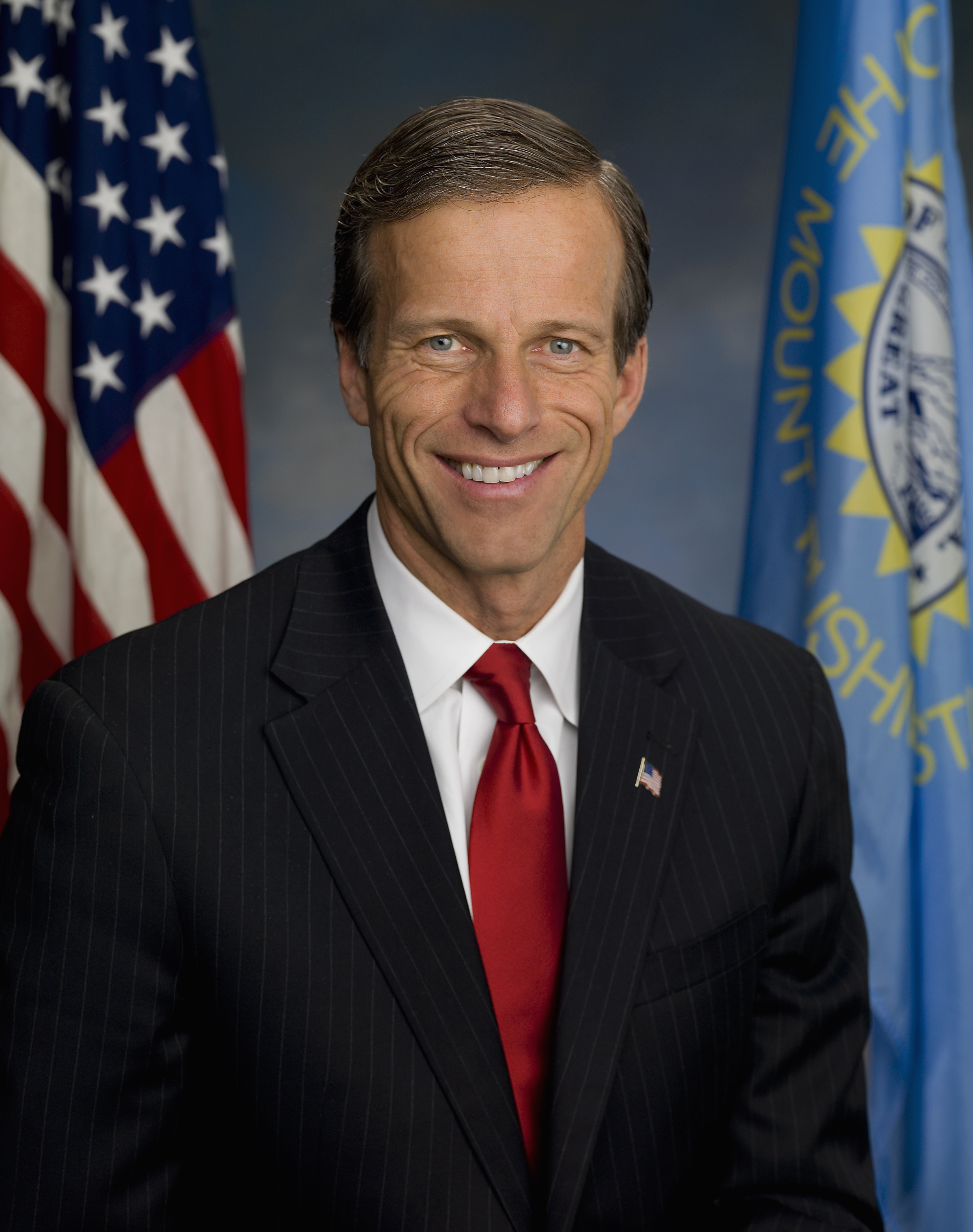
John Thune
U.S. Senator from South Dakota since 2005

== See also ==
- 2016 United States presidential election timeline

Candidates

- Democratic Party presidential candidates, 2016
- United States third party and independent presidential candidates, 2016

Primaries

- Democratic Party presidential primaries, 2016
- Republican Party presidential primaries, 2016

General election polling

- Nationwide opinion polling for the United States presidential election, 2016
- Statewide opinion polling for the United States presidential election, 2016

Democratic primary polling

- Statewide opinion polling for the Democratic Party presidential primaries, 2016
- Nationwide opinion polling for the Democratic Party 2016 presidential primaries

Republican primary polling

- Statewide opinion polling for the Republican Party presidential primaries, 2016
- Nationwide opinion polling for the Republican Party 2016 presidential primaries

Republican primary debates

- Republican Party presidential debates, 2016

Democratic primary debates

- Democratic Party presidential debates, 2016
