= Political positions of Jeb Bush =

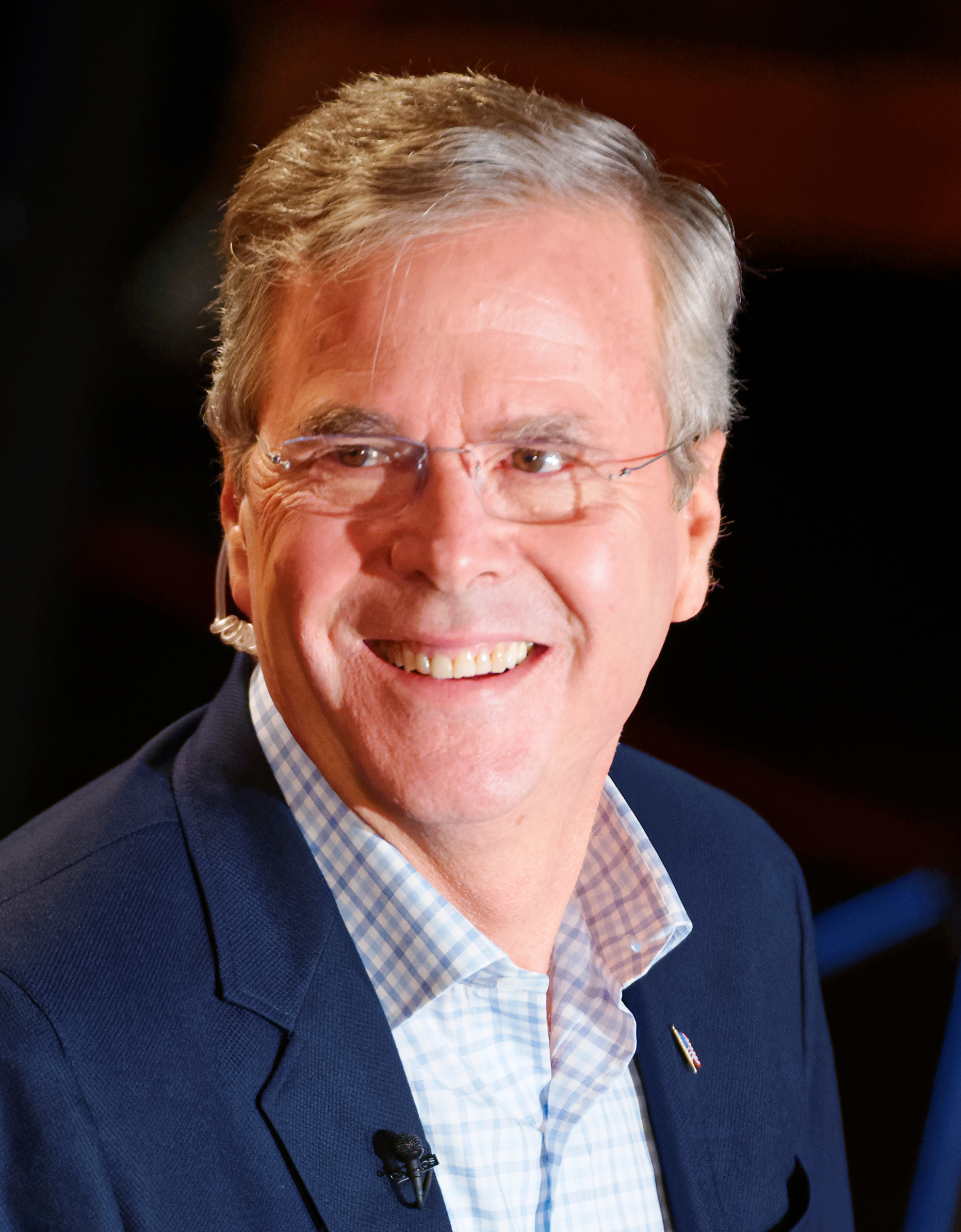
Bush during his announcement tour in June 2015

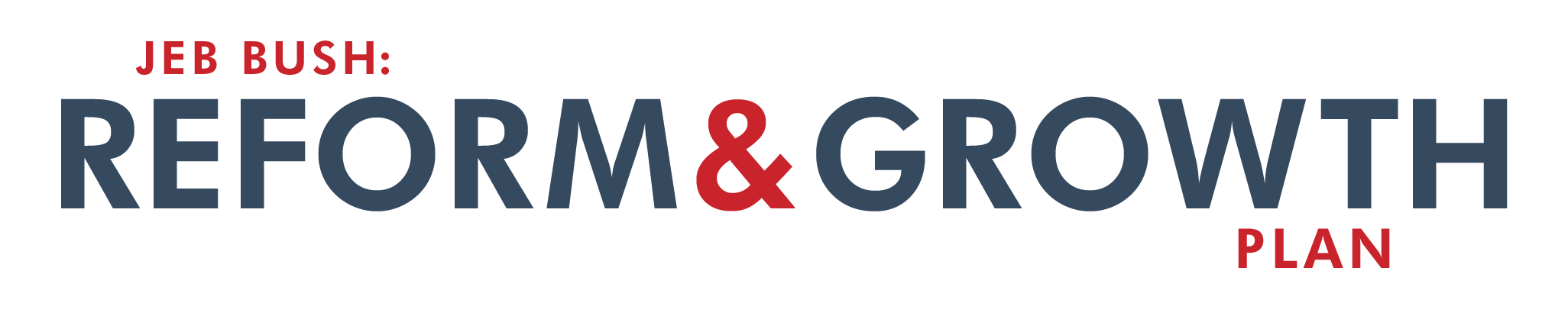
Bush's Reform & Growth Plan titlecard

Jeb Bush is a Republican politician in the United States. Bush was governor of Florida from 1999 to 2007. He was a candidate for the Republican nomination for president of the United States in the 2016 election.

== Political orientation ==
In 2013, statistician Nate Silver "constructed ideological scores for a set of plausible 2016 Republican candidates based on a combination of three statistical indices." Bush's ideological score on this scale was similar to that of previous Republican nominees John McCain and Mitt Romney. A January 2015 Bloomberg News analysis suggested that Jeb Bush is more conservative than former presidents George W. Bush (Jeb's brother) and George H. W. Bush (Jeb's father). Ramesh Ponnuru of the conservative National Review, writes that "Despite his reputation for moderation, on issue after issue Jeb has taken positions that are significantly to the right of his brother's — and of every other president in recent memory."

Before winning two terms as governor, Bush lost his first run for governor of Florida in 1994 to the incumbent Democratic Governor, Lawton Chiles. In his 1994 race, Bush "called himself a 'head-banging conservative.'" Andrew Prokop of Vox writes that after his loss in the 1994 election, Bush retained very conservative beliefs and policies, but sought to adopt a more moderate image.

Bush was subsequently elected governor for two terms in office, from 1999 to 2007. Darryl Paulson, professor emeritus of government at the University of South Florida, said: "[Bush] governed as a conservative, and everyone in the Florida Republican Party considered him a conservative." Adam C. Smith, political editor of the Tampa Bay Times, writes that "Bush was not just a successful Republican governor politically; he was a conservative activist governor who relished pushing the envelope on policy." Steve Schmidt, senior campaign advisor to McCain in the 2008 presidential campaign, stated that at the time Bush left office as governor of Florida, "he was widely, unanimously, unambiguously regarded as the most conservative governor in the United States." Political scientist Susan MacManus of the University of South Florida, said: "In Florida, [Bush is] still perceived as conservative, especially on fiscal issues and even on social issues."

In a February 2015 question-and-answer session with Sean Hannity at the CPAC conference, Bush stated: "I would describe myself as a practicing, reform-minded conservative."

Bush has been criticized by some Tea Party members as being insufficiently conservative, as he supports positions on immigration and the Common Core State Standards Initiative that are unpopular with some conservatives.

== Domestic issues ==
=== Abortion ===
Bush supports legislation to ban abortion after 20 weeks, making exceptions for the life of the mother, rape, or incest. In August 2015, Bush said: "My record as a pro-life governor is not in dispute. I am completely pro-life and I believe that we should have a culture of life." In 2003, Bush described himself as "probably the most pro-life governor in modern times."

As governor, Bush signed a parental notification act into law and supported the creation of a "Choose Life" specialty license plate. In 2003, Bush attracted national media attention after his administration sought the appointment of a guardian for the fetus of a developmentally disabled rape victim, a move which "angered women's rights groups and reignited the debate over abortion in Florida." In 2005, Bush sought to block a 13-year-old pregnant girl who had lived in a state-licensed group home from obtaining an abortion; a judge ruled against the state, and Bush decided not to appeal further.

Bush supports the defunding of Planned Parenthood. In July 2015, Bush called for a congressional investigation of Planned Parenthood in connection with an undercover video controversy. In August 2015, Bush said, "I, for one, don't think Planned Parenthood ought to get a penny ... And that's the difference because they're not actually doing women's health issues. They're involved in something way different than that." The Washington Post "Fact Checker" column said that this statement was a "false claim" and "patently incorrect," and Politifact rated it "Pants on Fire," with both noting that Planned Parenthood provides a wide array of women's health services.

In October 2015, Bush said on Fox News Sunday that he opposed shutting down the government in an attempt to defund Planned Parenthood, as some congressional Republicans have pushed for. Bush stated: "That's not how democracy works."

As governor of Florida, Bush used his line-item veto to eliminate funding for Planned Parenthood affiliates in Florida, which had previously used state funds to provide pap smears, sexually transmitted disease screening and treatment, and family planning services to poor women. Bush redirected those funds to abstinence-only sex education programs.

=== Affirmative action ===
In early 2015, Bush touted an executive order that he issued as governor of Florida which limited affirmative action. In November 1999, as governor of Florida, Bush issued a "One Florida" executive order banning affirmative action in the State University System of Florida. Bush stated that he issued the order to head off a more-restrictive Ward Connerly-backed ballot initiative. The order was controversial, particularly among Black Americans, and led to a widely publicized sit-in in Bush's Florida State Capitol office by two Democratic state legislators, Senator Kendrick Meek and Representative Tony Hill. Following the Bush executive order, black enrollment at state universities (and especially at the University of Florida and Florida State University) has declined.

=== Civil liberties and electronic surveillance ===
Bush supports the USA Patriot Act, and criticized efforts to stop its reauthorization. Bush stated that opponents of the Act's reauthorization were "wrong" and that "the Patriot Act has kept us safe, plain and simple. The metadata program has kept us safe, plain and simple. There's been no violation of civil liberties."

Bush supports the continued collection of metadata of phone calls by the National Security Agency. In a February 2015 speech, Bush said that the NSA metadata domestic-surveillance program was "hugely important" and said that he was perplexed at the opposition to the program: "For the life of me I don't understand, the debate has gotten off track." In August 2015, Bush said that he favored expanded government surveillance of Americans to "make sure that evildoers aren't in our midst." Bush said that encryption "makes it harder for the American government to do its job" and called for more cooperation between the government and U.S. technology companies. Bush stated, "There's a place to find common ground between personal civil liberties and [the National Security Agency] doing its job. I think the balance has actually gone the wrong way." In a December 2015 interview on Fox and Friends, Bush said of the bulk collection of phone call metadata, Bush said: "This is part of a comprehensive strategy to protect the homeland. Civil liberties are not being violated, and to have the NSA have this information is part of an essential tool for us to be kept safe."

In September 2015, Bush published a five-point cybersecurity plan that would establish a "command focus" on Internet security. The plan calls for increased funding, greater cooperation internationally and between the public and private sectors, and more government accountability to combat Internet security threats. Bush also reiterated his support for the NSA and argued in favor of the Cybersecurity Information Sharing Act (CISA). Privacy experts believe the proposed legislation includes loopholes which could be used to increase government surveillance.

When asked by Michael Medved in an April 2015 talk radio interview "what has been the best part of the Obama administration?" Bush responded: "I would say the best part of the Obama administration would be his continuance of the protections of the homeland using the big metadata programs, the NSA being enhanced."

In July 2015, Bush said that NSA whistleblower Edward Snowden "should be given no leniency." Bush's comment was in response to a statement made by former U.S. Attorney General Eric Holder, who suggested that some sort of deal was possible to allowing Snowden to return to the United States.

Bush condemned his primary rival Donald Trump's proposal to create a database to track American Muslims, close mosques, and possibly require American Muslims to carry special identification. Bush characterized such proposals as un-American, saying: "I find it abhorrent that Donald Trump is suggesting we register people ... You're talking about internment, you're talking about closing mosques, you're talking about registering people, and that's just wrong, I don't care about campaigns. It's not a question of toughness, it's manipulating people's angst and their fears."

=== Confederate flag ===
In early February 2001, while governor of Florida, Bush quietly ordered the removal of the Confederate "Stainless Banner" flag from the Florida State Capitol grounds.

In June 2015, Bush stated that he viewed the Confederate flag as a racist symbol. In December 2015, Bush said: "The problem with the Confederate flag isn't the Confederacy. The problem with the Confederate flag is what it began to represent later."

=== Crime and criminal justice ===
In his 1994 campaign, Bush proposed publishing the names of juvenile delinquents so the public would "know who the thugs are in their neighborhoods."

In 2002, Bush opposed a Florida ballot measure that would have allowed nonviolent drug offenders to enter treatment programs instead of prison. Bush's then-24-year-old daughter had been arrested the same year on drug-related charges and underwent treatment.

In 2016, while campaigning for the presidency, Bush spoke publicly about his family's experience with addiction and published on Medium.com a "multi-pronged" addiction policy plan, "which includes working to begin drug abuse and addiction prevention during childhood, strengthening the criminal justice response to the epidemic by helping nonviolent offenders receive treatment and increasing punishments for sales, stopping the flow of illegal drugs across the border, and improving treatment and recovery programs."

==== Capital punishment ====
In his 1994 campaign, Bush promised to sign many more death warrants as governor. One of the "central themes" of Bush's 1994 campaign was his proposal to shorten the appeals period in capital cases. Bush proposed limiting death-row inmates to a single appeal (a plan Bush called "one trial, one appeal") to speed up the execution process to "two to four years in most death cases."

During his eight-year term as governor, Bush signed and carried out the death warrants of 21 prisoners. In January 2000, several months after the botched execution via electric chair of murderer Allen Lee Davis, Bush signed a law making lethal injection the state's default method of execution, with death by electrocution available upon request for inmates who do so within 30 days of the Supreme Court of Florida's affirmation of their death sentence.

Today, Bush is a hesitant supporter of the death penalty. He is opposed to Florida's current eight of twelve supermajority rule introduced by Gov. Ron DeSantis, and believes the state should return to the unanimous jury requirement it used previously. In a November 2015 interview with Chuck Todd for NBC's Meet the Press, Bush stated that "it's hard for me, as a human being, to sign the death warrant, to be honest with you. I'm informed by my faith in many things, and this is one of them. So I have to admit that I'm conflicted about this." Aside from his religious objections as a Catholic, Bush takes issue with the effectiveness (or rather, lack thereof) of capital punishment as a deterrent, its strain on the judicial system, and the long waiting period between the sentencing and execution of death row inmates. In July 2024, Bush expressed regret for not reforming Florida's capital punishment system during his gubernatorial tenure, adding that he "certainly considered it" during his last year but "kind of ran out of time to do it."

=== Education ===
==== K-12 ====
As Florida governor, Bush placed significant emphasis on education reform, particularly in the areas of "test-based accountability, private-school vouchers, and support for improved reading instruction." A major provision of Bush's voucher plan (the Opportunity Scholarship Program) was struck down in 2006 by the Florida Supreme Court and was replaced by a different plan, which is also being challenged in courts. Bush has frequently criticized traditional public schools and teachers' unions. He has described public schools as "politicized, unionized monopolies" and "government-run monopolies run by unions." He is a proponent of charter schools, and as governor he advocated high-stakes testing in Florida, arguing that this improves accountability.

As governor of Florida, Bush oversaw the establishment of a new plan in which schools were given a letter grade (from "A" to "F"). In 2013, Bush praised outgoing New York City mayor Michael Bloomberg for instituting a similar school-grading policy, and criticized incoming Mayor Bill de Blasio for his opposition to it.

In November 2014, Bush advocated for increased pay for educators, saying, "It's too bad we can't use the money we are wasting on meeting arbitrary numbers and divert it to where it will do more good, such as rewarding our best teachers with the pay they deserve. Great teachers are critical to the success of children, and incentivizing them to stay on the job, or to teach in our most-challenging schools, is a reform that actually will produce results."

In August 2015, Bush expressed support for "total voucherization" of schools, saying that schools would benefit from "innovation."

Bush supports the Common Core State Standards Initiative, but "opposes using federal funds to motivate or force states to adopt Common Core." He has challenged opponents of Common Core to come up with an alternative with even more rigorous standards, saying: "If people don't like Common Core, fine. Just make sure your standards are much higher than they were before."

Bush was a staunch opponent of a 2002 amendment to the Florida Constitution which limited class sizes. The amendment was approved by voters over Bush's strong objections. In 2015, Bush called for the class-size amendment to be repealed.

In his 1995 book, Bush suggested that corporal punishment in schools could prevent school shootings.

In September 2024, Bush wrote an op-ed piece for The Dallas Morning News advocating for a nationwide ban on mobile phone use in K-12 education. Bush asserts that problematic social media use is a contributing factor in the prevalence of several psychiatric disorders in children and young adults, including anxiety, depression, and Internet addiction. He further contends that smartphone use in the classroom causes poor academic performance, citing a report from the Organisation for Economic Co-operation and Development (OECD) which indicated a inverse correlation between students' time spent on social media and their scores in mathematics. He commended "phone-free policy" legislation enacted by several state legislatures across the country, but opined that legislators should also enact policies promoting digital literacy education for youth.

==== Higher education ====
Bush has supported a shift from "a provider-driven model to a consumer-driven one" in higher education and has suggested "exporting U.S. post-secondary education to global consumers at scale."

In 2015, Bush criticized Democratic presidential candidates' college affordability and debt-free college proposals, characterizing such proposals as "more free stuff" without reform.

Bush is a supporter of for-profit colleges and has "close ties to for-profit online education models." He has criticized the "gainful employment rule" adopted by the Department of Education under the Obama administration. This rule aims "to hold institutions accountable for consistently leaving students with big debts and little employment prospects." Bush believes that the rule's treatment of for-profit institutions is too harsh.

As governor of Florida, Bush proposed cutting $111 million from the budgets of Florida public universities and community colleges. Bush ultimately signed a budget that cut $11 million from community college budgets, which "forced them to turn away about 35,000 students looking to enroll." By 2004, however, "Bush was able to fully fund community colleges, earning plaudits from state educators."

==== Other ====
In a November 1994 interview with the Orlando Sentinel, Bush stated that he "would abolish the Department of Education as it now exists."

In 2003, as Florida governor, Bush sought to close the Florida State Library, and lay off its entire staff of 41 as a cost-cutting measure. Bush proposed moving the library's collection to a private university in South Florida. Bush's proposal generated substantial public opposition, and was dropped after the Florida Legislature refused to support it.

=== Environment ===
In early 2015, Bush called the Environmental Protection Agency "a pig in slop" and stated "We have to begin to rein in this top-down driven regulatory system."

As governor of Florida, Bush oversaw an Everglades restoration plan that was part of an $8 billion project conducted in conjunction with the federal government. The plan set aside over one million acres of land for conservation. Michael Grunwald writes that "at best, [Bush's] legacy in the Everglades is mixed. It's hard to argue for better considering how little of his vision has come to fruition, even if you accept his claim that his vision was foolishly abandoned by a successor who listened too carefully to shortsighted Everglades activists. ... Still, his critics and allies agree he's formidable. When it came to the Everglades, he did his homework, devised a plan and stuck to it."

==== Energy ====
Early in his term as governor of Florida, Bush was an outspoken opponent of drilling for oil and gas in the Gulf of Mexico, off Florida's shores. This stance was in opposition to the position of most Republicans, including Jeb's brother George W. Bush, who sought to expand drilling. However, later on in his term, Bush switched positions; "in 2005, he angered environmentalists by backing a bill in Congress to allow drilling in some of the same areas he had fought to keep off limits in 2001, in exchange for creating a 125-mile buffer zone around the state where drilling would be blocked," arguing that this was the most realistic plan to protect Florida waters. In July 2008, Bush stated "had I known that gas was going to be $4.30 per gallon, ... I would have supported a lifting of the [drilling] moratorium with proper safeguards."

Bush has consistently supported offshore drilling outside Florida, including in the Arctic National Wildlife Refuge. In 2013, Bush "called for opening up 'federal lands and water for drilling in a thoughtful way.'" Bush supports the TransCanada's Keystone XL oil pipeline, stating that it is a "no-brainer." In emails in 2006, Bush expressed support for the Keystone Pipeline System, Keystone XL's predecessor.

Bush supports hydraulic fracturing (fracking). In the summer of 2013, Bush called fracking a "phenomenal achievement" and stated that New York and other states that would not allow it "are choosing not to grow." At the time, Bush had a financial interest in a private equity company which was then "raising $40 million to back a Denver-based company acquiring fracking wells in hopes New York would lift its ban." Bush also sees support for natural gas development as a way of reducing greenhouse gas emissions.

In March 2015, Bush called for eliminating the federal wind-energy production tax credit over a three-to-five-year phase-out period.

In July 2015, Bush said at an Americans for Prosperity event that "we should phase out, through tax reform," current tax credits and subsidies for all energy sectors, including wind, solar, and fossil fuels (oil and gas).

Bush is a supporter of nuclear power, saying that it will address global climate change while increasing energy security.

==== Climate change ====
Bush acknowledges climate change, but has equivocated about the degree to which humans are responsible. National Journal writes that Bush "does not acknowledge the scientific consensus that human activity drives climate change."

In September 2015, Bush released his energy plan. Bush's plan made no mention of climate change. It called for the repeal of the Clean Power Plan (an EPA initiative that aims to reduce carbon emissions from power plants by 32 percent and which critics say will lead to many coal-based power plants closing) and repeal of the EPA's clean water and coal ash rules.

In May 2015, Bush stated: "The climate is changing" but that "I don't think the science is clear what percentage is man-made and what percentage is natural. It's convoluted. And for the people to say the science is decided on, this is just really arrogant, to be honest with you." At the same event, Bush said that climate change should not be "the highest priority" issue, but should not be ignored either.

In April 2015, Bush stated that "The climate is changing, and I'm concerned about that. We need to work with the rest of the world to negotiate a way to reduce carbon emissions." But Bush "also said he was more concerned about protecting the economy, warning of 'the hollowing out of our industrial core, the hollowing out of our ability to compete in an increasingly competitive world.'" In 2011, Bush stated that "global warming may be real," but that "it is not unanimous among scientists that it is disproportionately manmade."

In 2015, Bush took issue with Laudato si', an encyclical written by Pope Francis which calls for a global effort to combat climate change. Bush stated "I don't get economic policy from my bishops or my cardinals or my pope. ... religion ought to be about making us better as people and less about things that end up getting in the political realm."

==== Public lands ====
In an October 2015 event at Rancho San Rafael Regional Park in Reno, Nevada, Bush called for giving greater control of federal lands to the states, deferring to state governments on issues such as "managing wildlife, streams and wetlands and in deciding when and where to establish national monuments."

Bush proposed speeding up issuance of permits for land uses such as mining and redirecting some federal land-acquisition funds to national-park maintenance projects. Bush also proposed moving the Interior Department headquarters from Washington to a Western city, specifically naming Reno, Denver, and Salt Lake City as possible locations. Bush's proposals were criticized by conservationists such as the League of Conservation Voters and Center for Western Priorities, but praised by Republican officials in Nevada, including former Nevada lieutenant governor Brian Krolicki and U.S. Senator Dean Heller.

==== Endangered species ====
As governor of Florida, Bush said that he supported conservation of the endangered Florida manatee, but rejected a compromise proposal by the Save the Manatee Club and the boating industry for a $10 fee on each new boat registration to hire 100 new wildlife officers to boost enforcement of boat speed zones, because he considered the proposed fee to be a tax. This prompted two lawsuits by the Save the Manatee Club and its coalition to go forward. Eventually, state and federal agencies agreed in a settlement to establish new speed zones and refuges to protect manatees, a measure unpopular among Florida voters. At the urging of Florida's voting industry, Bush appealed to Interior Secretary Gale Norton "to delay any announcement and possibly forgo implementation of federally designated refuges and sanctuaries." The delay prompted a federal judge to a twice threaten to find Norton in contempt of court, and the settlement eventually went forward over Bush's objections.

=== LGBT rights ===
Bush had opposed same-sex marriage for years, believing that the issue of same-sex marriage should be decided by the states rather than by the federal government and that it is not a constitutional right. He holds that businesses should have the right to refuse to provide services for same-sex couples on religious grounds.

In a statement released in January 2015, after Florida began issuing licenses to same-sex couples following a court ruling, Bush said: "We live in a democracy, and regardless of our disagreements, we have to respect the rule of law. I hope that we can also show respect for the good people on all sides of the gay and lesbian marriage issue – including couples making lifetime commitments to each other who are seeking greater legal protections and those of us who believe marriage is a sacrament and want to safeguard religious liberty."

Bush has stated that his personal views were informed by his Catholic faith. Before the U.S. Supreme Court's ruling in Obergefell v. Hodges was issued, Bush said that "irrespective of" the outcome "we need to be stalwart supporters of traditional marriage." Bush also stated "To imagine how we are going to succeed in our country unless we have committed family life, committed child-centered family system, is hard to imagine." After the Supreme Court's June 2015 ruling in Obergefell that there is a constitutional right to same-sex marriage, Bush issued a statement in which he said that the decision was wrong, saying: "Guided by my faith, I believe in traditional marriage. I believe the Supreme Court should have allowed the states to make this decision." However, Bush also said in a statement that he does not support an amendment to the U.S. Constitution to allow states to ban same-sex marriage.

As governor, Bush championed Florida's strict ban on adoptions of children by gays and lesbians. In January 2015, Bush said: "Previously, I opposed gay adoption, but it has since become the law in our state, and I respect that decision."

In July 2015, Bush said he supported lifting the military's ban on allowing transgender people to openly serve in the military, so long as "the military's comfortable with this" and it did not impact morale.

In a 1994 op-ed written while Bush was making his first campaign for governor, Bush argued that LGBT persons should not have the same protections accorded to persons based on race or religion, writing "[should] sodomy be elevated to the same constitutional status as race and religion? My answer is No." In 2015, a Bush spokesperson said that the op-ed "does not reflect Governor Bush's views now, nor would he use this terminology today."

In his 1995 book, Profiles in Character, Bush described the "gay rights movement," "feminist movement," and "black empowerment movement" as "modern victim movements" which "have attempted to get people to view themselves as part of a smaller group deserving of something from society." Bush said that such movements are, "a major deviation from the society envisioned by Martin Luther King, who would have had people judged by the content of their character and not by the color of their skin — or sexual preference or gender or ethnicity."

=== Gun control ===
Overall, Bush is for expanding gun owners' rights.

As governor of Florida, Bush signed into law several bills "extending new rights to gun owners, including those to expand protections for people permitted to carry concealed firearms." One such measure signed by Bush allows reciprocity for out-of-state permit holders. The number of concealed-carry permit-holders in Florida went up during Bush's tenure, and Florida has more concealed carry license holders than any other state, partially as a result of the new laws, a fact which Bush has touted while campaigning in 2015.

In 2005, as governor, Bush signed the "stand-your-ground law" on the use of deadly force.

In June 2015, following the Charleston church shooting, he rejected calls for stricter gun control laws, stating that he does not believe tougher gun laws would prevent mass shootings. Bush indicated that he continues to support Florida's background-check law but opposes a universal background check law, expressing the belief that background checks should be determined state-by-state.

In reference to renewed calls for legislative action after tragic events such as the 2015 Umpqua Community College shooting in Oregon, Bush said: "I had this challenge as governor because we had — look, stuff happens. There's always a crisis and the impulse is always to do something, and it's not necessarily the right thing to do." When later asked by a reporter to clarify his comment, Bush said "Things happen all the time" adding, "Things. Is that better?" The New York Times reported: "The inelegant phrase immediately set off a wave of criticism from observers suggesting he was playing down the scourge of gun violence."

=== Healthcare ===
==== Overall healthcare proposals ====
Bush released his healthcare proposals in October 2015. The proposal would repeal the Patient Protection and Affordable Care Act (ACA) and eliminate the ACA requirement that health plans provide certain "essential health benefits" such as maternal healthcare and mental healthcare. Bush proposed new tax credits (adjusted for age, but not for income) for those lacking employer-based health insurance. The plan also called for the repeal of the Cadillac insurance plan tax and its replacement with a similar tax; for allowing some businesses to contribute to their workers' health insurance plans instead of providing coverage themselves; and for capping federal health spending to states and created a block grant-like Medicaid program. The potential effects of Bush's plan—including its effect on health care costs and the deficit—are uncertain.

During the 2015 campaign, Bush has called for replacing the ACA with a "market-oriented" alternative. He has called the current law a "monstrosity" that is "flawed to its core." Bush has proposed some sort of state- or local-government funded "catastrophic coverage" system, in which "if you have a hardship that goes way beyond your means of paying for it, ... the government is there or an entity is there to help you deal with that." After the U.S. Supreme Court upheld the ACA in King v. Burwell in June 2015, Bush stated that the decision was "not the end of the fight" against the law.

In April 2014, Bush expressed opposition to the ACA provision which bars health insurance companies from denying coverage based on pre-existing conditions, stating "What if you have a Big Mac for breakfast, lunch, and dinner? You'll get a pre-existing condition pretty soon, because you'll get a heart condition. Should society pay for that behavior? That's a question that the ACA ignores." Bush has suggested limiting the definition of "pre-existing condition" to genetic disorders at birth.

In June 2015, Bush said that he opposed requiring employers to provide health-care benefits to employees (the employer mandate) and opposed requiring individuals to carry health insurance (the individual mandate).

==== Medicaid and Medicare ====
In March 2013, Bush expressed opposition to Florida accepting federal funds for Medicaid expansion, as provided for by the ACA (which allocates funds to extend medical coverage to all adults with annual incomes at or below 133% of the federal poverty level).

In July 2015, Bush stated that "we need to figure out a way to phase out" Medicare, the federal program that provides health insurance to Americans once they turn sixty-five years old. Bush praised Paul Ryan's proposal to replace Medicare with a voucher system. In response to charges from Democrats that Bush's plans would destroy Medicare, Bush said that he wanted to "reform" rather than eliminate the program.

In April 2015, Bush has suggested that Medicare recipients be required to sign advance directives (outlining end-of-life care instructions) before receiving benefits.

While Bush was governor of Florida, he launched a Medicaid overhaul plan intended to reduce the costs of the program to the state. The Bush pilot program (which Bush referred to as "empowered care") began in 2006 and later expanded to five counties; under the program, private insurers were permitted to manage the Medicaid program and decide which benefits to offer. In 2012, Bush stated that the program was a success that led to better cost control and health outcomes. In 2013, reports showed that plans participating in the Bush reform program "ranked below the national Medicaid average on 21 of the 32 quality indicators reported by the state."

==== Women's health ====
In August 2015, at a Southern Baptist Convention event, Bush stated that "I'm not sure we need half a billion dollars for women's health issues." Several hours later, Bush released a statement saying: "With regards to women's health funding broadly, I misspoke, as there are countless community health centers, rural clinics, and other women's health organizations that need to be fully funded. They provide critical services to all, but particularly low-income women who don't have the access they need." Bush also stated that he would have wanted funding for Planned Parenthood to be redirected to other women's health organizations, in line with his record as Governor of Florida; in 2003, Bush redirected $124,000 in funding from Planned Parenthood toward abstinence-only sex education programs.

==== Privatization ====
Bush has called for privatizing some elements of the Veterans Affairs health-care system. While Bush was governor of Florida, the State launched a privatization initiative in which three state veterans' nursing homes contracted out their nursing and food services to private companies; one of the facilities suffered from substandard care problems, however, and Bush's successor, Governor Charlie Crist, ended the program.

=== Immigration ===
In 2015, while campaigning for the Republican nomination for president, Bush has called for what he terms "a path to earned legal status"—but not citizenship—for people in the United States illegally. Bush says that his proposal would allow undocumented workers to secure a provisional work permit, and thus avoid deportation, if they met various requirements, such as paying back taxes and an additional fine, receiving work permits, learning English, and not committing crimes. Bush has rejected characterizations of his plan as "amnesty," arguing that his plan is "dignified" and "the most practical way of dealing with this problem."

Bush has expressed support for tougher enforcement of immigration laws, including prosecution of businesses that try to hire illegal aliens. In a January 2015 speech, Bush stated of people who have overstayed their visas, "We ought to be able to find where they are and politely ask them to leave."

On the campaign trail in 2015, Bush criticized hard-line anti-immigration proposals made Donald Trump and others, who Bush called "louder voices" in the Republican Party. Bush had criticized proposals by Trump and others to build border wall between Mexico and the United States, calling such a wall unnecessary, logistically impossible, and expensive. Similarly, Bush has repeatedly criticized proposals to simply round up and deport illegal immigrants. Speaking on John Catsimatidis' radio show in August 2015, Bush said that Trump's proposal to deport all illegal immigrants "would tear family lives asunder" and was unconstitutional. In September 2015, speaking at the national convention of the U.S. Hispanic Chamber of Commerce, Bush called for comprehensive immigration reform, and said "We don't need to deport every person that's in this country [illegally]. That's not a practical, conservative plan. That won't solve the problems."

In September 2015, Bush "offered a sharp rebuke of the notion of multiculturalism," saying: "We should not have a multicultural society."

Bush says that he wants to increase the number of people permitted to immigrate to the U.S. based on their skills, while decreasing the number who immigrate because of family relationships. He compared President Obama's executive orders creating the Deferred Action for Childhood Arrivals (DACA) and Deferred Action for Parents of Americans (DAPA) programs to the decrees of "a Latin American dictator," stating that he favors changes through legislation and not by executive order. Bush vowed to revoke those executive orders.

Previously, in March 2013, Bush stated on NBC's Meet the Press that comprehensive immigration reform could take either the path to citizenship or a path to legalization, but that illegal immigrants should not get these benefits at lower cost than legal immigrants. Bush also stated that the bipartisan comprehensive immigration reform bill (which passed the Senate in 2013, but was never taken up by the House) was a "good effort" in addressing the problem. In October 2013, Bush again called for passage of immigration reform.

In April 2014, Bush said of those who "crossed the border because they had no other means to work to be able to provide for their family": "Yes, they broke the law, but it's not a felony. It's an act of love. It's an act of commitment to your family. I honestly think that that is a different kind of crime that there should be a price paid, but it shouldn't rile people up that people are actually coming to this country to provide for their families." The "act of love" remark became the subject of Act of Love, an attack ad by the campaign of Bush's rival Trump regarded by some as a turning point in the campaign. In an August 2015 Republican primary debate, Bush said that he stood by his comment.

In July 2015, Bush said that federal funds should be withheld from so-called "sanctuary cities," jurisdictions that do not cooperate with U.S. Immigration and Customs Enforcement. "Bush acknowledged in his remarks that there are different types of sanctuary cities, but did not go into detail on how he would decide which would be blocked from receiving funding."

In a 2013 book and again in August 2015, Bush said that he disagreed with proposals to amend the Constitution to eliminate the Fourteenth Amendment's guarantee of jus soli ("birthright") citizenship to persons born in America.

Also in August 2015, Bush used the pejorative phrase "anchor babies" to refer to children born in the United States to undocumented immigrants, although he previously chaired the conservative Hispanic Leadership Network group, which had issued a memo advising Republicans to not use the term. Bush later said that he did not believe the phrase was offensive and that he did not regret using the phrase.

At an August 2015 campaign event, Bush asserted that "The federal government right now does not deport criminals ... criminals should be deported, and right now the Obama administration is not doing that." PolitiFact rated this claim "false," noting that in 2014, U.S. Immigration and Customs Enforcement (ICE) deported about 86,000 illegal immigrants convicted of previous crimes.

=== Marijuana ===
Bush believes that each state should decide on marijuana legalization. He has opposed measures to allow either recreational or medical marijuana in his home state of Florida. In 2014, he opposed the "United For Care" amendment (Florida Amendment 2), a proposed state constitutional amendment on the ballot which would have "allow[ed] physicians to recommend medical marijuana to people with 'debilitating' medical conditions." Bush issued a statement reading, "I strongly urge Floridians to vote against Amendment 2."

Bush is "conflicted" over whether the federal government should enforce federal marijuana laws in states in which medical marijuana is legal under state law, stating "I don't know. I'd have to sort that out."

Bush has acknowledged that he smoked marijuana while a high school student at Phillips Academy. He says that choice was "wrong" and a "stupid decision."

=== Native Americans ===
In talk radio interviews in September and October 2015, Bush defended the Washington Redskins' controversial name, which Native American groups have protested for years as racially offensive. Bush said that he does not believe the term is a pejorative for Native Americans and said that the team should not change its name. Redskins owner Daniel Snyder, who has vowed to never change the team name, has contributed $100,000 to Bush's "Right to Rise" super PAC. The team name was later provisionally changed to the Washington Football Team in 2020 pending a permanent name

Bush's remarks on the mascot were condemned by several Native American tribes.

=== President Obama conspiracy theories ===
Bush has repudiated the Barack Obama citizenship conspiracy theories ("birtherism") and religion conspiracy theories espoused by Rick Perry, Donald Trump, and others. In 2011, Bush wrote: "Republican candidates should categorically reject the notion that President Obama was not born in the United States." In 2015, Bush stated of Obama: "He's an American, he's a Christian."

=== Puerto Rico ===
In April 2015, Bush said in San Juan that the political status of Puerto Rico should be determined by Puerto Ricans (saying "This should be a question of self-determination") and that he supported statehood (saying "I think statehood is the best path, personally. I have believed that for a long, long while"). Bush said the next president should "use their influence" to pressure Congress into taking an up-or-down vote on whether to admit Puerto Rico to the Union.

On the Puerto Rican debt crisis, Bush supports granting Puerto Rico the option of using Chapter 9 of the bankruptcy code to restructure its debts.

=== Terri Schiavo case ===
During the Terri Schiavo case in 2003 while he was governor, the Florida state legislature passed legislation ("Terri's Law") giving Bush authority to intervene in the case. Bush ordered a feeding tube reinserted, and sent the Florida Department of Law Enforcement (FDLE) to remove Schiavo from a hospice where she was staying. In 2004, the Florida Supreme Court unanimously overturned the law as unconstitutional.

In early 2015, Bush referred to the case, and defended his actions, suggesting that a way to deal with such situations in the future would be by requiring Medicare recipients to sign advance directives outlining end-of-life care instructions before receiving benefits.

=== Science and technology ===
==== Net neutrality ====
Bush is an opponent of net neutrality (calling it "one of the craziest ideas I've ever heard") and has said that "I hope that Congress acts" to reverse the Federal Communications Commission's net neutrality rules. In July 2015, Bush said of net neutrality: "It's a stupid idea" and "Sometimes when there's not a problem, maybe we shouldn't solve it."

In September 2015, Bush "vowed to dismantle the net neutrality rules, which give the commission strict oversight of ISPs and prohibit paid fast lanes, speed throttling, and targeted app blocking."

==== NASA ====
In a July 2015 interview, Bush called himself a "space guy" and said that if elected president, he would propose an increase in NASA funding. In the same interview, Bush also said that he supported increasing federal spending on research and development. In October 2015, Bush defended Newt Gingrich's proposal for a moon colony, calling the idea "pretty cool" and expressing support for "big, aspirational goals."

==== FDA and NIH ====
Bush's health care proposal, released in October 2015, calls for increasing funding for National Institutes of Health medical research. (Bush had suggested several months earlier that he would support an increase in NIH funding).

Bush has called for reforming Food and Drug Administration regulations "to accelerate the approval process for drug and device approval."

=== Voting rights ===
==== 2015 positions ====
At a forum in Des Moines, Iowa in October 2015, Bush said that he opposes reauthorizing the Voting Rights Act "as is."

==== Voter purges while governor of Florida ====
During Bush's tenure as governor of Florida, Florida Secretary of State Katherine Harris oversaw a "botched" voter purge of the Florida voters' roll. The initiative was aimed at removing ineligible voters from the rolls, but when program was launched, "it became immediately clear that the effort was generating a slew of false positives. Voters in good standing, who happened to share names with convicted felons, but had never been in trouble with the law, were being taken off the voting rolls." A number of emails from aggrieved voters who had been wrongfully removed from the voters' roll were sent to various Jeb Bush email accounts. The purge "wrongfully denied thousands of legitimate voters the ability to participate" in an extremely close presidential contest in Florida, which ultimately led to the Florida election recount in 2000 and Bush v. Gore, a Supreme Court ruling which ultimately decided the election. Estimates vary widely on how many people had been wrongly denied the right to vote; a 2001 Palm Beach Post investigation concluded "that at least 1,100 eligible voters were wrongly purged," but other reports put the figure much higher. For example, the Brennan Center for Justice estimated that 12,000 eligible voters had been wrongly identified as convicted felons and purged.

After the recount, Bush was subpoenaed in a post-election investigation by the U.S. Commission on Civil Rights; at a Commission hearing in January 2001, "Bush sought to distance himself from the botched purge, arguing that as governor, he was not charged with administering the election." The Commission's final report, issued in June 2001, found that there was a "strong basis" to determine that violations of the Voting Rights Act of 1965 had occurred in the 2000 election in Florida. The report found that Bush and Harris's "overall lack of leadership in protecting voting rights was largely responsible for the broad array of problems in Florida during the 2000 election," but did not find that they "conspired to disenfranchise voters."

Ahead of the 2004 election, the State of Florida attempted, but ultimately canceled, a second voter purge described as "botched." In 2004, a lawsuit forced the state to make public a list of 47,000 potential felons on the voting rolls; the Miami Herald reported in July 2004 that more than 2,000 names were incorrectly listed, and due to a database flaw, almost all Hispanic felons were omitted from the list. Less than two weeks after the list became public, the state stopped the initiative; Bush stated at the time that "Not including Hispanic felons that may be voters on the list ... was an oversight and a mistake ... And we accept responsibility and that's why we're pulling it back."

==== Other voting positions while governor of Florida ====
In 2004, Bush signed legislation creating a statewide maximum of 14 days for early voting. According to Politifact: "Election supervisors said it was highly popular and asked the Legislature to expand early voting hours and add more locations. But Bush and the GOP-led Legislature went the other way the next year, passing a law that capped the number of hours for early voting and confined it to election offices, city halls and libraries."

As governor of Florida, Bush frequently made the restoration of ex-felons' civil rights (including the right to vote) contingent on sobriety from drugs or alcohol. At the same time, 32 of Bush's line-item vetoes (totaling almost $13 million) cut funding for programs for substance-abuse treatment and offender-reintegration programs.

== Economic issues ==
=== Agriculture and farm subsidies ===
Bush has declined to express a position on subsidies to corn farmers.

Bush supports country-of-origin labeling regulations for meat.

Bush opposes the labeling of genetically-engineered foods.

=== Bailouts ===
Bush, who served as a senior advisor to the Barclays banking company after leaving office as Florida governor, supported the 2008 Troubled Asset Relief Program (the "Wall Street bailout"), which initially authorized $700 billion in loans from the U.S. government to the banking sector. Bush endorsed the bailout at a 2012 hearing before the House Budget Committee.

Bush opposed the 2008-2009 auto-industry bailout.

=== Budget, taxation, and labor ===
==== 2015 campaign positions ====
In announcing his presidential candidacy in 2015, Bush stated that his "goal as president" would be annual GDP growth of 4 percent and 19 million new jobs. Many economists believe that sustained 4 percent GDP growth is highly unlikely. In a July 2015 interview with the Union Leader, Bush said how to achieve his "aspiration" of 4 percent growth:

[W]e have to be a lot more productive, workforce participation has to rise from its all-time modern lows. It means that people need to work longer hours and, through their productivity, gain more income for their families. That's the only way we're going to get out of this rut that we're in.

Later the same day, Bush said that his statement "people need to work longer hours" referred to part-time workers who want to work longer hours, in line with Bush's previous statements about the problem of underemployment.

In September 2015, Bush unveiled his tax plan. The plan would cut the corporate tax rate from 35 percent to 20 percent; allow companies to immediately deduct their capital investments; phase out the taxation of U.S. corporate income earned abroad; cut the capital-gains tax rate for individuals from 23.8 percent to 20 percent; eliminate the alternative minimum tax and federal estate tax; double the size of the standard deduction; expand the earned income tax credit; reduce the current seven income tax brackets (ranging from 10 to 39.6 percent) into three brackets of 10 percent, 25 percent and 28 percent; and eliminate the deduction for state and local taxes. Bush's plan would zero out the marriage penalty for married couples filing joint returns, but his plan would not reduce marriage penalties on some tax credits; low-income couples "could lose some or all of their earned income tax credit (EITC) by choosing to marry." Bush also called for ending preferential tax treatment for carried interest, which fellow Republican contender Donald Trump and many Democrats have also called for.

Bush's tax plan was described as similar to the tax proposals of 2012 Republican presidential nominee Mitt Romney with various "populist, supply-side" variations, including several proposals which would benefit lower-income taxpayers. Bush's tax plan has also been described as similar to the George W. Bush tax cuts of 2001 and 2003. Speaking in September 2015 on Fox News Sunday, Bush said that the Bush tax policies "didn't (add to the deficit) as greatly as the static thinkers on the left think" because they "created a dynamic effect of high growth." Politifact rated this assertion "mostly false," concluding that "the evidence doesn't show that high growth occurred in the wake of the Bush tax cuts."

An analysis of Bush's tax plan by the nonpartisan Tax Policy Center conducted by economist Leonard Burman and others estimated that the plan would lose $6.8 trillion in the first decade (relative to the current tax code), and $8.6 trillion in the next decade. The Center concluded: "The [Bush] plan would improve incentives to work, save, and invest, but unless accompanied by very large spending cuts, it could increase the national debt by as much as 50 percent of GDP by 2036, which would tend to put a drag on the economy."

Under traditional accounting methods, Bush's plan would add $3.4 trillion to the U.S. national debt over ten years. Before the plan was released, the Bush campaign commissioned four Republican economists to write an analysis of the plan; their report, which used "dynamic scoring" accounting methods favored by Republicans, determined that the Bush plan would add $1.2 trillion to the debt and stimulate an additional 0.5 percent of GDP growth annually. According to The New York Times, the 0.5 percent estimate was not based on an economic model, but rather was chosen by the four Republican economists as an "educated guess"; economists "disagree wildly" on tax policy's effects on economic growth.

Bush's plan would cut federal income tax rates across the board, but wealthiest taxpayers would enjoy the largest tax cuts, although the wealthiest taxpayers would get lower benefit in terms of the tax reduction percentage, and in terms of being dropped from the income-tax rolls altogether. A New York Times analysis concludes that the plan "would reduce the effective income tax rate on filers making $10 million or more per year to approximately 21 percent, down from 26 percent in 2013, the most recent year for which data are available." A Tax Foundation analysis determined that the greatest percent increases in after-tax income under Bush's tax plan would go to the top 1% of U.S. earners, those earning more than around $406,000; such filers "would see their after-tax incomes increase on average by 11.6% ... the biggest change for any income group." According to Citizens for Tax Justice, more than half of Bush's tax cuts (52.9%) would accrue to the wealthiest 1%, while the poorest 20% of wage earners would receive less than a 3% tax cut. The plan would eliminate federal income taxes for families making $38,600 or less annually and would reduce federal taxes by a third for an additional 42 million families.

Bush opposes tax increases, but has declined to sign Grover Norquist's anti-tax pledge. Bush said that he "will not sign any pledges circulated by lobbying groups." Bush also declined to sign Norquist's pledge during his three campaigns for Florida governor, saying that he "doesn't believe in outsourcing principles."

A Bush spokesperson told the Washington Times in October 2014 that he does not support tax increases of any kind, although in 2012 Bush indicated he could accept a hypothetical budget deal containing one dollar in tax increases for every ten dollars of spending cuts.

==== As Florida governor ====
While Bush was in office, "Florida's outstanding debt rose from $15 billion to more than $23 billion. The state's annual debt service payments rose from $928 million to $1.7 billion."

According to a South Florida Sun-Sentinel news analysis, as Florida governor, Bush "championed tax cuts that chiefly benefited business and the wealthy." Under Bush's governorship, Florida reduced and then repealed the state's 0.2% tax on stocks, bonds, and other intangible assets. During Bush's tenure, the state also increased its reserves from $1.3 billion to $9.8 billion, which coincided with Florida receiving the highest possible bond rating for the first time.

Bush was governor during one of the strongest revenue periods for the state of Florida, due in part to the boom in property values fueled by the U.S. housing bubble, so that revenue grew despite the tax cuts he implemented.

Bush also instituted several state sales tax holidays and enacted a manufacturing deduction for electricity. The Cato Institute, a libertarian think tank, has stated that Bush was "a prolific tax cutter, but he let spending rise quickly toward the end of his tenure." In its biennial Fiscal Policy Report Card on America's Governors, the Cato Institute gave Bush grades of "B "(2000), "A" (2002), "B" (2004), and "C" (2006).

Bush has said that during his tenure as Florida governor, $19.3 billion in tax cuts were enacted. Politifact rated this statement as "half true," saying it "partially accurate but leaves out important details." Politifact noted that the $19.3 billion figure is based on estimates and projections for cumulative revenue changes each year. A large amount of the claimed $19.3 billion also comes from the phase-out of the federal estate tax, which was enacted by an act of Congress and not by the Florida state government. Economist Martin Sullivan, in a report for Tax Analysts, concluded that tax cuts in Florida totaled $13 billion during the eight-year Bush era; Sullivan's figure is not adjusted for inflation and excludes the estate tax (because it required no legislative action to go into effect). The tax cuts resulted in tax savings by 2006 of US$140 per person, per year.

Bush vetoed $2 billion from state budgets (Florida has a line-item veto).

According to a National Association of State Budget Officers report, state spending in Florida was cut by an average of 1.39 percent each year that Bush was in office as governor, with most cuts coming from public assistance, higher education, and state discretionary spending.

=== Consumer protection and financial regulation ===
Bush is a frequent critic of the Consumer Financial Protection Bureau and the Dodd–Frank Wall Street Reform and Consumer Protection Act of 2010. In November 2013, Bush asserted that new financial regulation rules instituted by Dodd–Frank in response to the Great Recession inhibited economic growth, stating that while banks "made some terrible and costly decisions in the past," they are now doing business more responsibly. In November and December 2015, Bush advocated increasing capital requirements for banks to reduce the threat of large ("too big to fail") financial institutions. In a December 2015 campaign appearance, Bush said that he was "open to the idea" of reinstating the Depression-era Glass-Steagall Act, which created a firewall between investment banks and commercial banks and was repealed by the Gramm–Leach–Bliley Act of 1999.

As a presidential candidate in 2015, Bush has proposed eliminating various consumer protection and food safety regulations, and imposing a freeze on new regulations. Bush also proposed a new requirement that "the cost of any new regulation must be offset by another's savings" and endorsed "a proposal that would require an up-or-down vote by Congress on economic regulations that cost at least $100 million."

=== Corporate subsidies ===
In 2003, Bush put together an "unprecedented" package of over $500 million in state and local incentive money to lure the Scripps Research Institute to expand into Palm Beach County, Florida. The package, described by the Los Angeles Times as "incredibly generous ... even by the standards of economic development deals," offered "new facilities, equipment and enough operating money to pay staff salaries for years" in an effort to spur the biotechnology industry. In promoting the plan, Bush made ambitious predictions of 40,000 jobs in spin-off jobs within 15 years of operation. Twelve years later, the plan largely "failed to deliver the blockbuster biotech cluster Bush promised," and in 2014 there were only 27,611 biotech jobs in Florida, according to the state statistics.

The use of corporate subsidies as part of economic-development plans declined in popularity after Bush left office, and the free-market advocacy group Club for Growth criticized Bush for the Scripps scheme in a 2015 report. A Bush spokesman defended the initiative, saying that it "diversified the economy, created high-wage jobs and contributed to significant scientific research advances."

=== Gambling ===
Before and during his term as governor of Florida, Bush was an opponent of expanded legalized gambling in the state. Before his term, Bush had served on the board of the anti-casino group No Casinos. In 1999, Bush told the St. Petersburg Times: "I am opposed to casino gambling in this state and I am opposed whether it is on Indian property or otherwise ... The people have spoken and I support their position." (Bush was referring to three failed referendums to approve casino gambling).

=== International trade ===
Bush has repeatedly expressed support for Trans-Pacific Partnership, writing "I have no problem supporting TPP." Bush also supports granting trade promotion ("fast track") authority to the Obama administration to complete the deal.

Bush supported the 2005 Dominican Republic–Central America Free Trade Agreement (DR-CAFTA).

=== Minimum wage ===
In 2005, Bush stated that he opposed raising the federal minimum wage, stating: "we need to leave it to the private sector. I think state minimum wages are fine." Bush later clarified that he is just opposed to raising the federal minimum wage, and does not support abolishing it altogether.

As Florida governor, Bush opposed a 2004 ballot measure (approved by Florida voters) which indexed the state minimum wage to inflation.

=== Privatization and public employees ===
In his unsuccessful 1994 race for governor, Bush "talked about 'blowing up' state agencies, and said he wanted to 'club [Florida's] government into submission.'"

As governor, Bush was a proponent of privatization and shrinking the state workforce. When he took his oath of office for a second term, Bush stated in his inaugural address at the Florida State Capitol in Tallahassee (surrounded by state buildings) that "There would be no greater tribute to our maturity as a society, than if we can make these buildings around us empty of workers."

Over Bush's eight years in office, Florida eliminated between 5,000 and 13,000 state-worker jobs, depending on which counting method is used.

Beginning in 2002, Bush privatized the state's child protective services system, continuing a shift that had begun under Bush's predecessor. Under Bush, state government "doubled the funding for the state's child welfare services, privatized the state's entire child welfare service system and subcontracted out the work of caring for foster kids." "Bush inherited one of—if not the—worst foster systems in the nation," and his changes to the system had mixed results; supporters stated that the changes had improved outcomes, while critics criticized the system for losing track of 500 children, including some who died, such as Rilya Wilson.

Other state services that were privatized under Bush include the "state government's personnel department, ... its prison food services, its Medicaid program, and its defense of death-row inmates." Bush unsuccessfully pushed to privatize the State Library collection and move its collection to a private university.

In a speech at Florida State University in Tallahassee in July 2015, Bush called for adopting a "three-out, one-in rule across the federal workforce" (with exceptions for positions deemed "critical"). Under this system, only one new federal hire would be made for every three federal employees who leave. Bush asserted that this would cut the size of the federal workforce by 10%. In the same speech, Bush called for stripping federal employees of certain civil service protections, but did not specify which civil service laws he would try to change.

In an October 2015 interview with Sean Hannity, Bush said that: "Let's create a little bit of a recession in Washington, D.C., so that we can have economic prosperity outside of Washington." This remark was criticized by D.C. "shadow senator" Michael D. Brown, who said: "My first impression is that it's reflective of the way these people think about our city, that this isn't a place where Americans live for some reason. Why would you say that about a place where 650,000 taxpayers live—many of whom are veterans?"

=== "Sharing" or "gig economy" ===
Bush has defended companies identified with the sharing economy or gig economy, such as Uber and Airbnb, calling them positive examples of disruptive innovation.

=== Social Security ===
Asked about former President George W. Bush's efforts to privatize Social Security, Bush said: "It would have made sense back then, now we're way beyond that." Bush has instead proposed various other cuts to the program.

Bush favors raising the retirement age (i.e., the age for collecting Social Security retirement benefits) "from 65 to 68 or 70." His position attracted scrutinity given the fact that the retirement age is 66, not 65 as Bush stated, and that under current law, full benefits must be delayed to 67. Bush has called for raising the retirement age "gradually, over a long period of time for people that are just entering the system. And I think we need to do that in relatively short order." Bush has specifically proposed raising the retirement age for Social Security from its current target age of 67 by one month every year, starting in 2015, so that by 2022, workers would have to be 70 to claim full benefits, or 65 for early benefits.

Bush has also proposed means-testing Social Security (i.e., reducing benefits for higher-income seniors). He also proposed eliminating a provision that reduces Social Security benefits to seniors who work and make more than $15,720 a year, and eliminating a 6.2% payroll tax on seniors who work beyond the retirement age.

=== Utility rate increases ===
Under SB 888, a bill signed into law by Bush in 2006, utility companies in Florida may "recoup advanced costs for building nuclear plants—even if they are never constructed." Duke Energy (which merged with Progress Energy in 2012) took advantage of this law to charge 1.7 million Duke customers in Florida an "advance fee" to pay for a proposed nuclear plant project which was ultimately canceled and proposed repairs to a facility that ultimately was closed instead. Under an October 2013 settlement with the Florida Public Service Commission (PSC), "customers would be on the hook for $3.2 billion in expenses, while insurers would pay $835 million and shareholders would pay the rest. A year later, under pressure from consumers and environmentalists, the PSC ordered Duke Energy Florida to credit $54 million back to ratepayers."

In 2009, two years after leaving office, Bush wrote an op-ed in support for a proposed $1.27 billion annual base rate increase by Florida Power & Light (FP&L), a Florida utility company. Bush stated that an increase was necessary "to allow utility companies to make an adequate return on their investment to expand efficient, clean power generation." FP&L's owner, NextEra Energy, is the largest Florida corporate donor to Bush's "Right to Rise" super PAC, contributing more than $1 million to the group in the first seven months of 2015.

== International relations and security ==
Nineteen of the 21 members of Jeb Bush's team of foreign-policy advisors (released in February 2015) worked in the administrations of his father George H. W. Bush or his brother George W. Bush, or both.

In the 2015 presidential campaign, Bush gave a speech saying that President Obama "believes that America's leadership and presence in the world is not a force for good," a claim repeated in a television ad by Bush's "Right to Rise" super PAC. The Annenberg Public Policy Center's FactCheck.org found 19 instances of Obama publicly describing the U.S. "as 'a force for good,' or something very similar."

=== Afghanistan ===
In October 2015, Bush praised President Obama's decision to slow the U.S. withdrawal from Afghanistan by keeping 9,800 troops in the country through most of 2016. Bush said "I think [Obama] made the right decision to keep troops on the ground" but called for a greater force, saying that he would prefer 10,000 troops in Afghanistan and that Obama "shouldn't short-change what our military commanders have said they need to complete the mission."

=== China ===
Bush has said that "we have an ongoing, deep relationship" with China and has advised letting the China-United States relationship "evolve."

At a September 2015 Republic primary debate, Bush said: "We should use offensive tactics as it relates to cyber security to send a deterrent signal to China." However, Bush criticized some rival Republican candidates' call to cancel a state dinner with Chinese President Xi Jinping, saying: "There's many other tools than we have without canceling a dinner. That's not gonna change anything."

=== Cuba ===
Bush opposes the normalization of U.S.-Cuba relations. In December 2014, before President Obama began that process, Bush said that "instead of lifting the embargo, we should consider strengthening it." In July 2015, Bush criticized the moves of the U.S. and Cuba to reopen their embassies. The same month, Bush told the Manchester, New Hampshire Union Leader editorial board that he would "probably" close a U.S. embassy to Cuba if elected.

In August 2015, when asked what he would do with prisoners who remain at the Guantanamo Bay detention camp in Cuba, Bush replied: "Keep 'em there." In November 2015, Bush pledged to keep the detention camp open "as long as the fight against Islamic militants lasts" if elected president.

=== France ===
In a Republican primary debate in October 2015, Bush criticized fellow Republican candidate Marco Rubio's poor Senate attendance record by comparing it to a "French workweek" in which "you get like three days where you have to show up." The remark sparked criticism in France, "for playing to a stereotype that, economists say and statistics show, is grossly exaggerated." Following the remark, Gérard Araud, the French ambassador to the United States, noted that the French work an average of 39.6 hours a week, more than the Germans.

Bush subsequently apologized to the French government for the remark.

=== Iran ===
Bush has called the April 2015 Iran nuclear deal framework a "horrific deal" and said he would likely terminate any final agreement should he become president. He has argued that the deal would put Iran into a position where it could intimidate the Middle East. Bush condemned the July 2015 final nuclear agreement between Iran and the P5+1 world powers, calling it "appeasement." However, Bush stated that he would not seek to revoke the agreement on his first day in office.

=== Israel ===
Bush says that he is "an unwavering supporter" of Israel and Israeli Prime Minister Benjamin Netanyahu. In a speech, Bush said his brother, former President George W. Bush, was his main adviser on policy with the Middle East. Bush later clarified that he was referring to policy on Israel, rather than on the Middle East as a whole.

=== Iraq, Syria, and ISIL ===
In August 2015, Bush said that additional U.S. ground troops may be needed in Iraq (beyond the estimated 3,500 U.S. military trainers and advisers there now) to fight the Islamic State of Iraq and the Levant (ISIS or ISIL), but did not call for a major deployment of forces. Bush said that he favored building a new U.S. base in Iraq's al-Anbar province, and embedding some U.S. troops with Iraqi armed forces to help train them and identify targets as joint terminal attack controllers (JTACs). Daniel W. Drezner, a professor of international politics at the Fletcher School of Law and Diplomacy at Tufts University, wrote in the Washington Post in August 2015 that: "If you look at Bush's actual specifics on Iraq, most of the things he suggests — 'support the Iraqi forces,' 'more support to the Kurds,' 'restart the serious diplomatic efforts' — aren't all that different from the current administration's policies. Bush might propose more forward deployment of U.S. forces, but otherwise his Iraq policy boils down to 'I'll try harder.'" Tim Mak of the Daily Beast, writing in August 2015, similarly noted that Bush is not pressing for "an aggressive policy shift" and that "many of the things [that Bush] is advocating for are being pursued by Obama and his administration," including U.S. support for the Iraqi forces, provision of U.S. aid to Kurdish fighters, U.S. engagement with Sunni tribes, and U.S.-led airstrikes against ISIS. Mak noted that "on the issue of arming the Kurds directly instead of the current policy, sending aid through the central Iraqi government, an issue his fellow Republicans have raised, Bush is silent."

In November 2015, Bush called for "overwhelming force" to be used against ISIL, including the deployment of U.S. ground troops, saying: "While air power is essential, it alone cannot bring the results we seek. The United States – in conjunction with our NATO allies and more Arab partners – will need to increase our presence on the ground."

Bush has called for establishing "safe zones" along the Syria-Turkey border as "a safe harbor for refugees, and to allow us to rebuild the remnants of the Syria free army." Bush has also called for imposing and enforcing a no-fly zone across part of Syria. In October 2015, Bush criticized rival Marco Rubio and other congressional Republicans for failing to approve President Obama's request to authorize military intervention in Syria, made in 2013 after the Ghouta chemical attack. Bush said: "I think people were sticking their fingers in the breeze and that's wrong. We should support the President because that was better than inaction. No action at all, we see what happens."

Bush has said that the U.S. is "duty-bound to provide support ... to deal with taking Assad out and taking ISIS out." Bush has not explained how Assad should be removed.

In May 2015, Bush stated that he would have ordered the 2003 invasion of Iraq had he been president at the time: "I would have [authorized the invasion], and so would have Hillary Clinton, just to remind everybody. And so would almost everybody that was confronted with the intelligence they got." He also indicated that the lack of focus on post-invasion security was a mistake. Several days later, Bush stated: "knowing what we know now, ... I would not have engaged. ... I would not have gone into Iraq." According to reporting by CNN, "Bush argued that the invasion—though perhaps inspired by faulty intelligence—had been beneficial, saying the world was 'significantly safer' without Saddam Hussein in power."

In an August 2015 speech, Bush defended his brother's handling of the Iraq War, stating: "I'll tell you, taking out Saddam Hussein turned out to be a pretty good deal." Bush stated that "the decision to dismantle the Iraqi army was a mistake, and I think my brother would admit that today." Bush blamed President Obama and former Secretary of State Hillary Clinton for the rise of ISIS and other post-Iraq War turmoil, saying that this was caused by a "premature" withdrawal of U.S. forces from Iraq in 2011. This statement attracted criticism (from Army Chief of Staff Raymond Odierno and others) because the U.S. withdrawal in 2011 was negotiated in 2008 by the George W. Bush administration.

=== Military spending ===
Bush has called for increased military spending, expressing the belief that 2.5% of GDP is an insufficient amount. In an August 2015 speech, Bush asserted that "we are in the seventh year of a significant dismantling of our own military," although in fact U.S. real spending on the military continued to increase until 2012.

Bush has called for reversing the sequestration cuts as applied to the military, which reduced the U.S. military budget by $1 trillion.

Bush has proposed a costly military buildup. Bush's plan calls for increasing the size of the Army by 40,000 soldiers and increasing the size of the Marine Corps by an additional 4,000 marines. He also favors increasing Navy submarine production, favoring plans to build two Virginia-class submarines a year (each such ship costs about $3 billion). Bush has also pledged to "'halt the mothballing of certain ships, such as cruisers, slated for premature retirement due to budget cuts,' a move that could cost hundreds of millions." For the Air Force, Bush proposed purchasing of a "minimum" of one hundred Long Range Strike Bombers, which would cost more than $100 billion. Bush also supports the F-35 Joint Strike Fighter program, the most expensive weapons program in U.S. history ($400 billion), but also "would explore other options for air supremacy," including a restoration of the F-22 or speeding up development of a new "air superiority combat system." Bush also supports renovation of the U.S. nuclear weapon arsenal.

=== Russia ===
Bush has called Russian president Vladimir Putin a "bully" and called for a "more robust" approach. Bush told reporters during a European trip in June 2015 that the U.S. should "consider putting troops" in Poland, Lithuania, Latvia and Estonia. Bush also proposed expanding U.S. military exercises in the region.

Bush has not offered a "detailed plan for ending the presence of Russian-backed troops in Ukraine."

=== Syrian refugee crisis ===
In September 2015, Bush stated that the United States should accept some refugees of the Syrian Civil War as long as there were adequate checks to "make sure that they're not part of ISIS or something like that," noting that the United States "has a noble tradition of accepting refugees."

In November 2015, speaking on CNN, Bush said: "I think we need to do thorough screening and take in a limited number ... We should focus our efforts as it relates to the refugees for the Christians." When later asked how he would identify Christian Syrian families, Bush said the burden would be on the refugees to demonstrate their religion: "You're a Christian—I mean, you can prove you're a Christian. You can't prove it, then, you know, you err on the side of caution." The suggestion by Bush and other Republican primary candidates that Christian refugees should be given priority drew a sharp response from President Obama, who called such proposals "shameful" and said "We don't have religious tests to our compassion."

=== Use of torture ===
When asked in June 2015 on the use of torture by the United States, Bush stated "I don't think that's necessary. Because I don't think we need it, it's not the law." When pressed on whether that position applied after the September 11 attacks, Bush stated: "I think it was appropriate at the time, given what we—you know, the uncertainty. We were under attack. I think it was appropriate—it was also appropriate to change the policies once we had enough history."

In August 2015, however, when asked whether he would retain or repeal President Obama's executive order prohibited the use of "enhanced interrogation techniques," Bush refused to rule out the use of torture, saying that while he was opposed to torture in general, "I don't want to make a definitive, blanket kind of statement." Bush also "said there was a difference between enhanced interrogation and torture" but declined to be specific.
