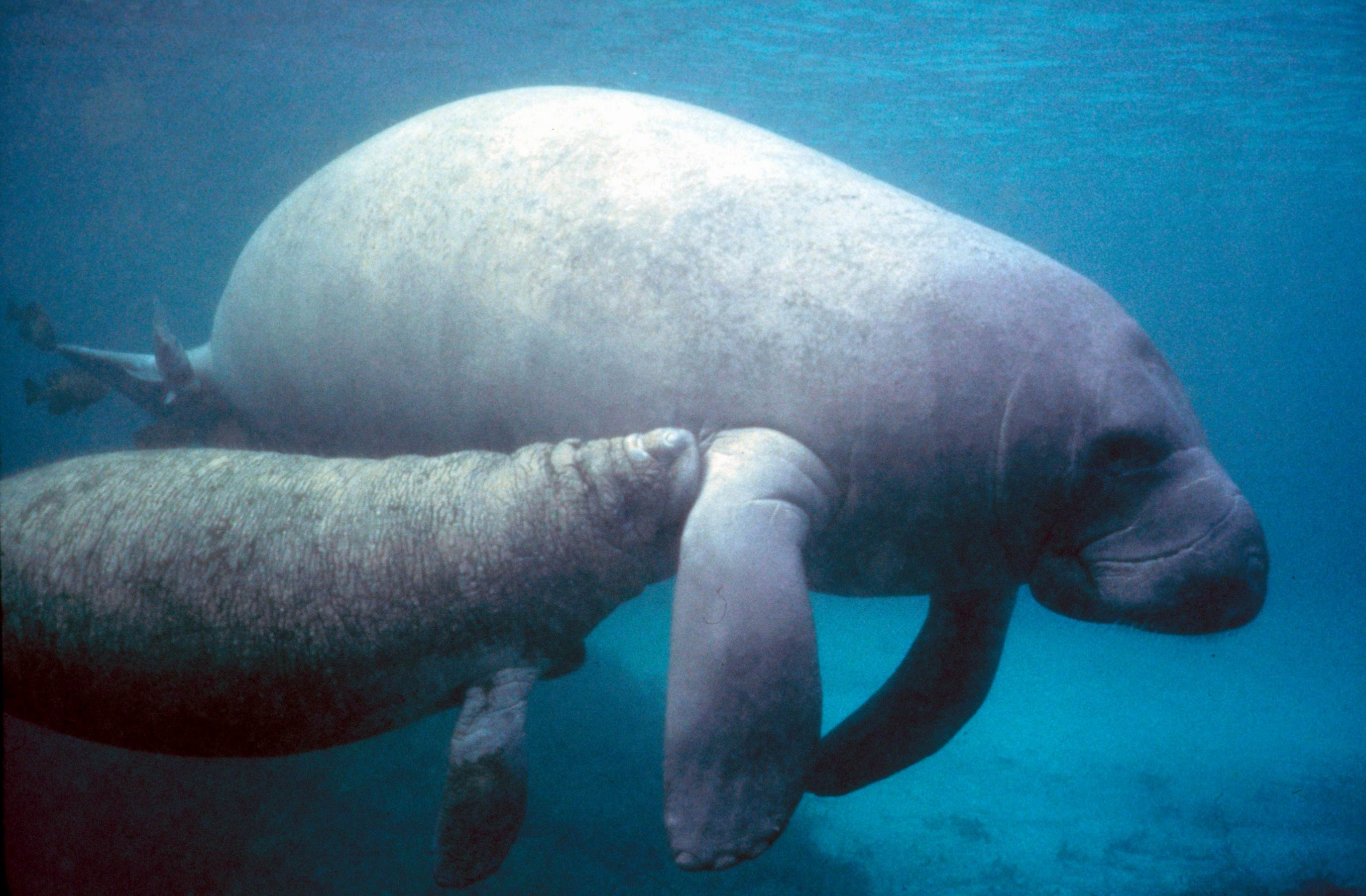
- Female Antillean manatee (T. m. manatus) with nursing calf

Conservation status
- Vulnerable (IUCN 3.1) (Overall species)

- Near Threatened (IUCN 3.1)⠀(Each subspecies: T. m. latirostris and T. m. manatus)

Scientific classification
- Kingdom: Animalia
- Phylum: Chordata
- Class: Mammalia
- Order: Sirenia
- Family: Trichechidae
- Genus: Trichechus
- Species: T. manatus

Binomial name
- Trichechus manatus Linnaeus, 1758
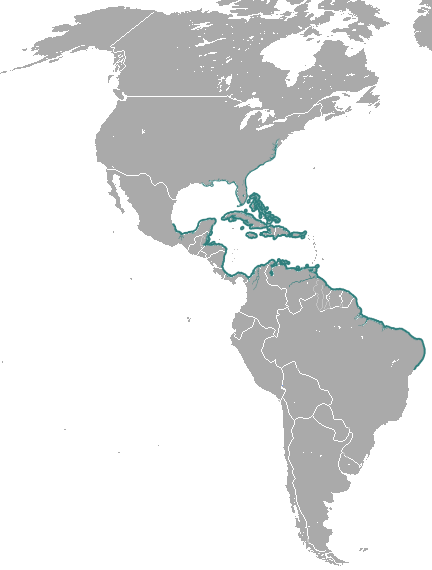
- West Indian manatee range

= West Indian manatee =

West Indian manatee Temporal range: Pleistocene-Recent

Species of mammal

The West Indian manatee (Trichechus manatus), also known as the North American manatee, is a large, aquatic mammal native to warm coastal areas of the Caribbean, from the Eastern United States to northern Brazil. Living alone or in herds, it feeds on underwater plants and uses its whiskers to navigate. It is divided into two subspecies, the Florida manatee (T. m. latirostris) in the United States and the Antillean manatee (T. m. manatus) in the Caribbean, of which the Florida manatee is classified as threatened and the Antillean manatee is classified as endangered; both face pressure from habitat loss, pollution, and other human activity. The West Indian manatee is the largest living member of the sirenians (order Sirenia), a group of large aquatic mammals that includes the dugong, other manatees, and the extinct Steller's sea cow.

Manatees are herbivores, have developed vocal communication abilities, and are covered in highly sensitive whiskers (called vibrissae) that are used for feeding and navigation. In breeding season, several males form mating herds around an individual female; on average, one calf is born to a female manatee every two to three years.

In the 1970s, the West Indian manatee was listed as endangered in the United States under the Endangered Species Act, when there were only several hundred left. The decades since have witnessed significant efforts to protect this species from natural and human threats, particularly collisions with watercraft. In 2017, the United States changed the classification to threatened, citing a substantial increase in the total population.

In 2025, a petition began by the U.S. Fish and Wildlife Service to reinstate them as endangered.

== Description ==
The average West Indian manatee is about 2.7–3.5 m (8.9–11.5 ft) long and weighs 200–600 kg (440–1,320 lb), with females generally larger than males. The largest individual on record weighed 1,655 kg (3,649 lb) and measured 4.6 m (15 ft) long. Manatees are estimated to live 50 years or more in the wild, and one captive Florida manatee, Snooty, lived for 69 years (1948–2017). A captive manatee named Romeo, held at the Gulfarium Marine Adventure Park in Fort Walton Beach, was recognized as the world record holder at 71 years of age in February 2026.

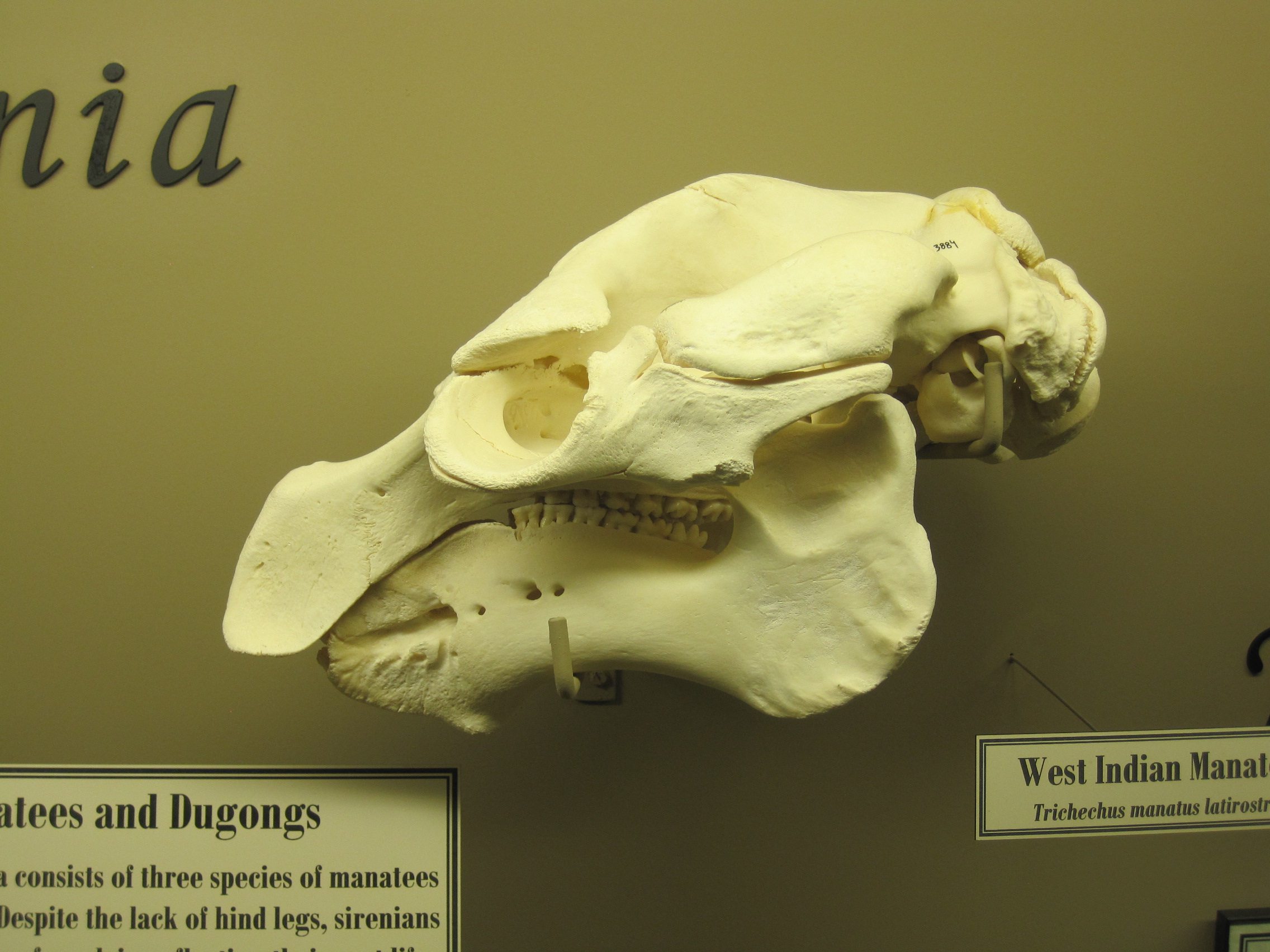
Skull of a West Indian manatee on display at The Museum of Osteology, Oklahoma City, Oklahoma

3D model of skeleton

Given that manatees are mammals, they breathe air, have warm blood, and produce milk. Like the other sirenians, the West Indian manatee has adapted fully to aquatic life, having no hind limbs. Instead of hind limbs, the manatee has a spatula-like paddle for propulsion in the water. Manatees have evolved streamlined bodies which lack external ear flaps, thus decreasing resistance in the aquatic environment. Pelage cover is sparsely distributed across the body, which may play a role in reducing the build-up of algae on their thick skin. Manatee skin is gray but can vary in coloration due to algae and other biota, like barnacles, that opportunistically live on manatees. Scar tissue on manatees is white and persists for decades, allowing for easy identification. The Florida manatee has three to four nails on each flipper.

The West Indian manatee has a prehensile snout, like their relative the elephant, for grabbing vegetation and bringing it into their mouths. Manatees have six to eight molariform teeth in each jaw quadrant. These molariform teeth are generated at the back of the mouth and slowly migrate towards the front of the mouth, at a rate of 1–2 mm per month, where they then fall out. This tooth 'conveyor belt' provides unlimited tooth production which is beneficial for the manatee which feeds on vegetation four to eight hours per day and consumes 5–10% of its body weight per day. Manatees have 3–5 cm hairs that cover their whole body and provide somatosensory information. Manatee bones are dense and solid which allows them to act as ballast and promote negative buoyancy. This helps counteract the positive buoyancy which comes from their high fat content. These two buoyancy counterparts, along with air in the lungs, helps manatees achieve neutral buoyancy in the water. This makes breathing, foraging, and swimming easier for the manatee. Manatees are unique, compared to other mammals, in that they have a longitudinally oriented diaphragm that is split in half to form two hemidiaphragms. Each hemidiaphragm is capable of independent muscular contractions.

== Distribution and habitat ==
The West Indian manatee inhabits mostly shallow coastal areas, including rivers and estuaries. Manatees can withstand large changes in salinity and are found in both freshwater and saltwater. Manatees' extremely low metabolic rate and lack of a thick layer of insulating body fat limits them to locations with warm waters, including tropical regions.

The Florida subspecies is primarily found along the Florida coast, but has been spotted as far north as Dennis, Massachusetts, as well as along the Gulf Coast of Texas. Concerning their forays inland, a manatee was once spotted in the Wolf River (near where it enters the Mississippi) in Memphis, Tennessee, in 2006: a distance of over 700 river miles from the Gulf of Mexico. The Antillean subspecies has a sparse distribution throughout the Caribbean, ranging as far north as Mexico and as far south as Brazil. During the Pleistocene, the West Indian manatee had a wider range across North America with fossils being found in Texas, and the Mississippi River and Ohio River.

An analysis of mitochondrial DNA patterns indicates there are actually three primary geographic groups of the West Indian manatee: (i) Florida and the Greater Antilles; (ii) Mexico, Central America and northern South America; and (iii) northeastern South America.

The seasonal distribution of the West Indian manatee varies with water temperatures. Temperatures below approximately 20 °C (68 °F) increase the risk of cold-induced stress or mortality for manatees. Consequently, Florida manatees seek out warm-water refuges during the winter, concentrated primarily along the Florida peninsula. Many of these refuges are artificial, created by the runoff from nearby power plants. In contrast, the Antillean manatee is less susceptible to cold-induced stress due to the warmer waters across its range.

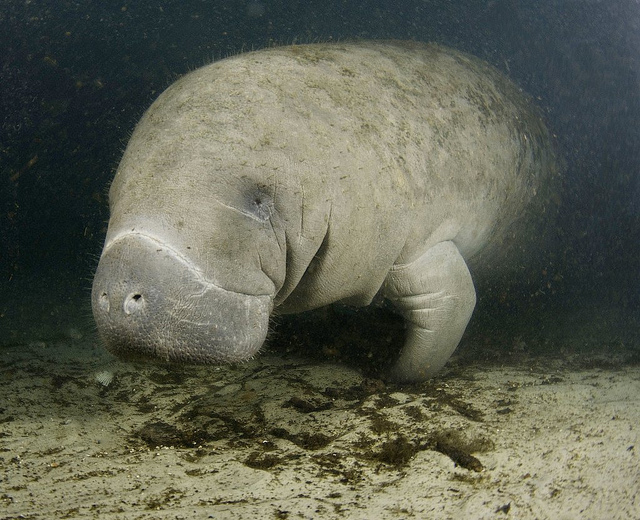
Manatee from Crystal River, Florida

Florida manatees inhabit the most northern limit of sirenian habitats. There are four recognized subpopulations of the Florida manatee, termed the Northwest, Southwest, Atlantic Coast and St. John's River populations. Large concentrations of Florida manatees are located in the Crystal River and Blue Spring regions in central and north Florida. The Antillean manatee is sparsely distributed throughout the Caribbean and the northwestern Atlantic Ocean, from Mexico, east to the Greater Antilles, and south to Brazil. Populations can also be found in The Bahamas, French Guiana, Suriname, Guyana, Trinidad, Venezuela, Colombia, Panama, Costa Rica, Curaçao, Nicaragua, Honduras, Guatemala, Belize, Cuba, the Dominican Republic, Jamaica and Puerto Rico. It is possibly extirpated from the Turks and Caicos Islands, and definitively so from all the Lesser Antilles except Trinidad and Curaçao. Its presence in Haiti is uncertain. A reintroduction was planned to take place in Guadeloupe, but was terminated early due to political issues.

== Behavior and diet ==
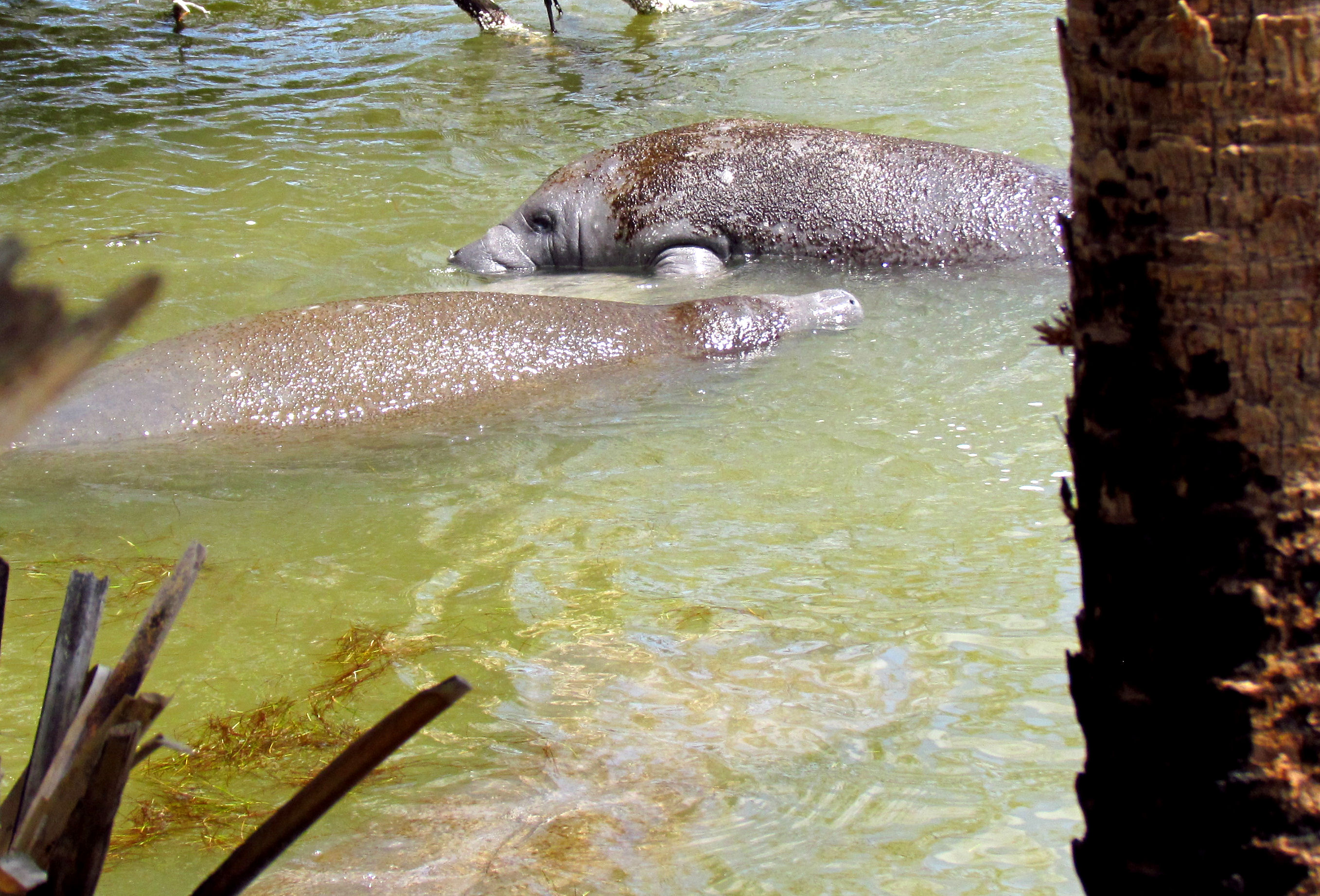
Basking at Haulover Canal, Merritt Island National Wildlife Refuge, Florida

=== Behavior ===
Because manatees evolved in habitats without natural predators, they lack predator avoidance behavior. The large size and low metabolic rates of manatees lends to their capacity for long and deep dives, as well as their relative lack of speed. Manatees are frequently solitary creatures, but they do aggregate at warm-water habitats during the winter and during the formation of breeding herds. In spite of their docile demeanor, due to their large size the West Indian manatee has nearly no natural predators in its native environment. American alligators and American crocodiles have been suspected to on occasion take a manatee. A dying manatee was discovered in Puerto Rico, wounded by a large shark bite thought to be inflicted by either a tiger shark or bull shark. It is projected that large sharks may threaten manatees occasionally but rarely enter the manatee's brackish habitats, whereas marine mammals in more direct coastal oceanic waters are well known to be highly vulnerable to sharks and orcas.

=== Communication ===
Manatees have been shown to form large mating herds when males come across estrous females, indicating that males may be able to sense estrogen or other chemical indicators. Manatees can communicate information to each other through their vocalization patterns. Sex and age-related differences are apparent in the vocalization structure of common squeaks and screeches in adult males, adult females, and juveniles. This may be an indication of vocal individuality among manatees. An increase in manatee vocalization after a vocal playback stimulus shows that they may be able to recognize another manatee's individual voice. This behavior in manatees is found mostly between mother and calf interactions. However, vocalization can still be commonly found in a variety of social interactions within groups of manatees, which is similar to other aquatic mammals. A 2023 study found significant differences in the acoustic characteristics of manatee vocalizations between populations in Florida, Belize, and Panama, suggesting that geographic location may influence their communication patterns.When communicating in noisy environments, manatees that are in groups experience the same Lombard effect as humans do; where they will involuntary increase their vocal effort when communicating in loud environments. Based on acoustic and anatomical evidence, mammalian vocal folds are assumed to be the mechanism for sound production in manatees. Manatees also eat other manatees' feces; it is assumed that they do this to gather information about reproductive status or dominance, indicating the important role chemoreception plays in the social and reproductive behavior of manatees.

=== Hearing ===
Despite their size, manatees have a broad hearing range, measured between 0.25 and 90.5 kHz, with peak sensitivity from 8 to 32 kHz. This range is adapted to their coastal habitat, but their hearing is easily masked by ambient biological noise, such as that from snapping shrimp. The audiogram of the manatee depicts that in many coastal areas manatee hearing is limited by background noise.

=== Diet ===
Manatees are obligate herbivores that feed on over 60 species of aquatic plants in both fresh and salt water. Seagrass is a staple of the manatee diet, particularly in coastal areas. In addition, when the tide is high enough, they will also feed on grasses, roots and leaves (including those of mangroves), as well as algae. Manatees typically graze for five or more hours per day, consuming anywhere from 4% to 10% of their body weight in wet vegetation per day, though the exact amount depends on their body size and activity level. Because manatees feed on abrasive plants, their molars are often worn down and are replaced many times throughout their lives, thus earning the nickname "marching molars." The molar teeth are similar in shape, but of varying sizes. Manatees do not have incisors; these have been replaced by horny gingival plates. Some individuals may also inadvertently eat invertebrates (such as small aquatic insects and crustaceans) and will eat fish both in captivity and in the wild.

Manatees are nonruminants with an enlarged hindgut. Unlike other hindgut fermenters, such as the horse, manatees efficiently extract nutrients, particularly cellulose, from the aquatic plants in their diet. Manatees have a large gastrointestinal tract with contents measuring about 23% of its total body mass. In addition, the passage rate of food is very long (about seven days). This slow process increases the digestibility of their diet. It is suggested that chronic fermentation may also provide additional heat and is correlated with their low metabolic rate.

=== Vibrissae ===
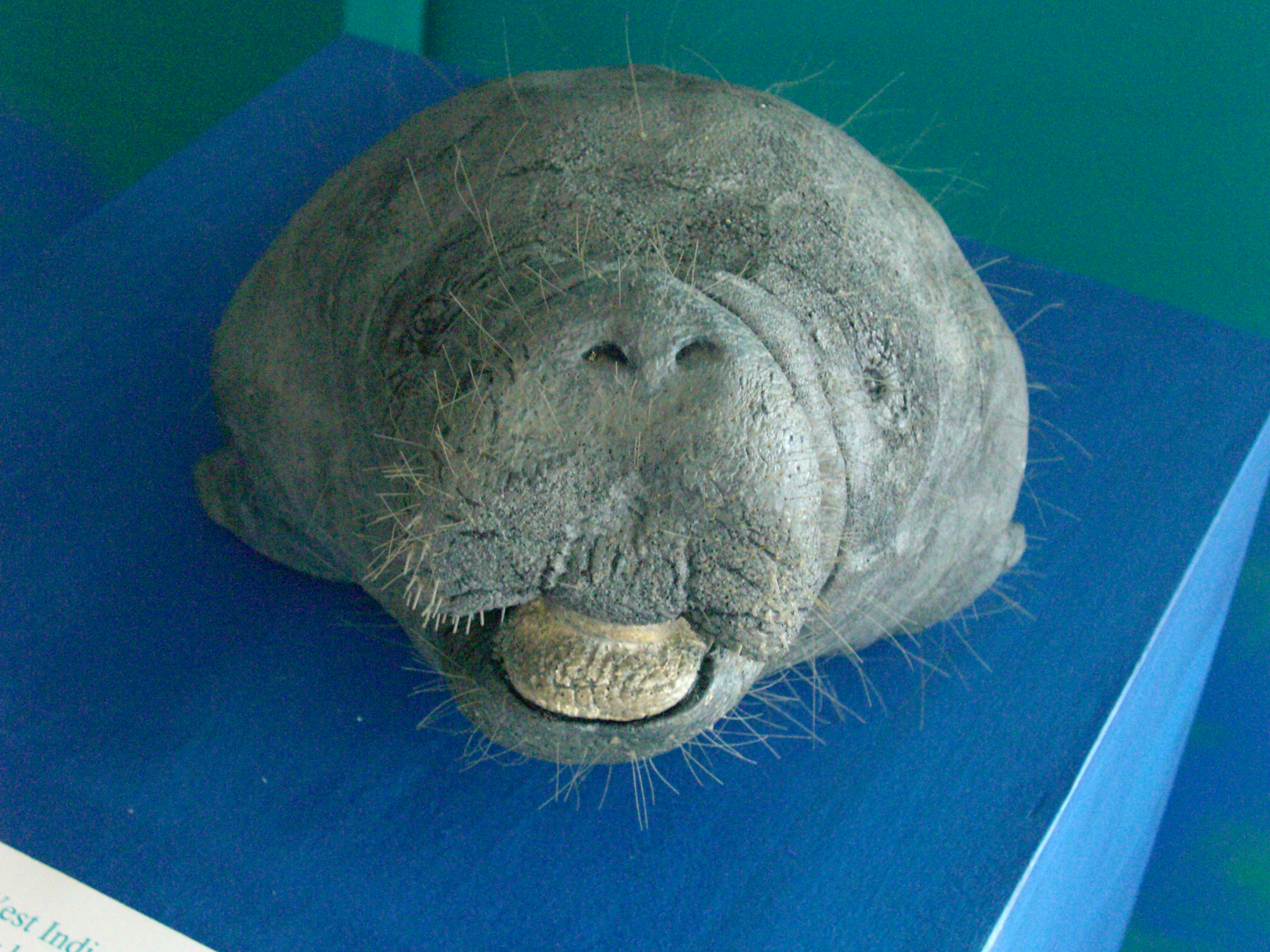
Sculpture of manatee showing vibrissae

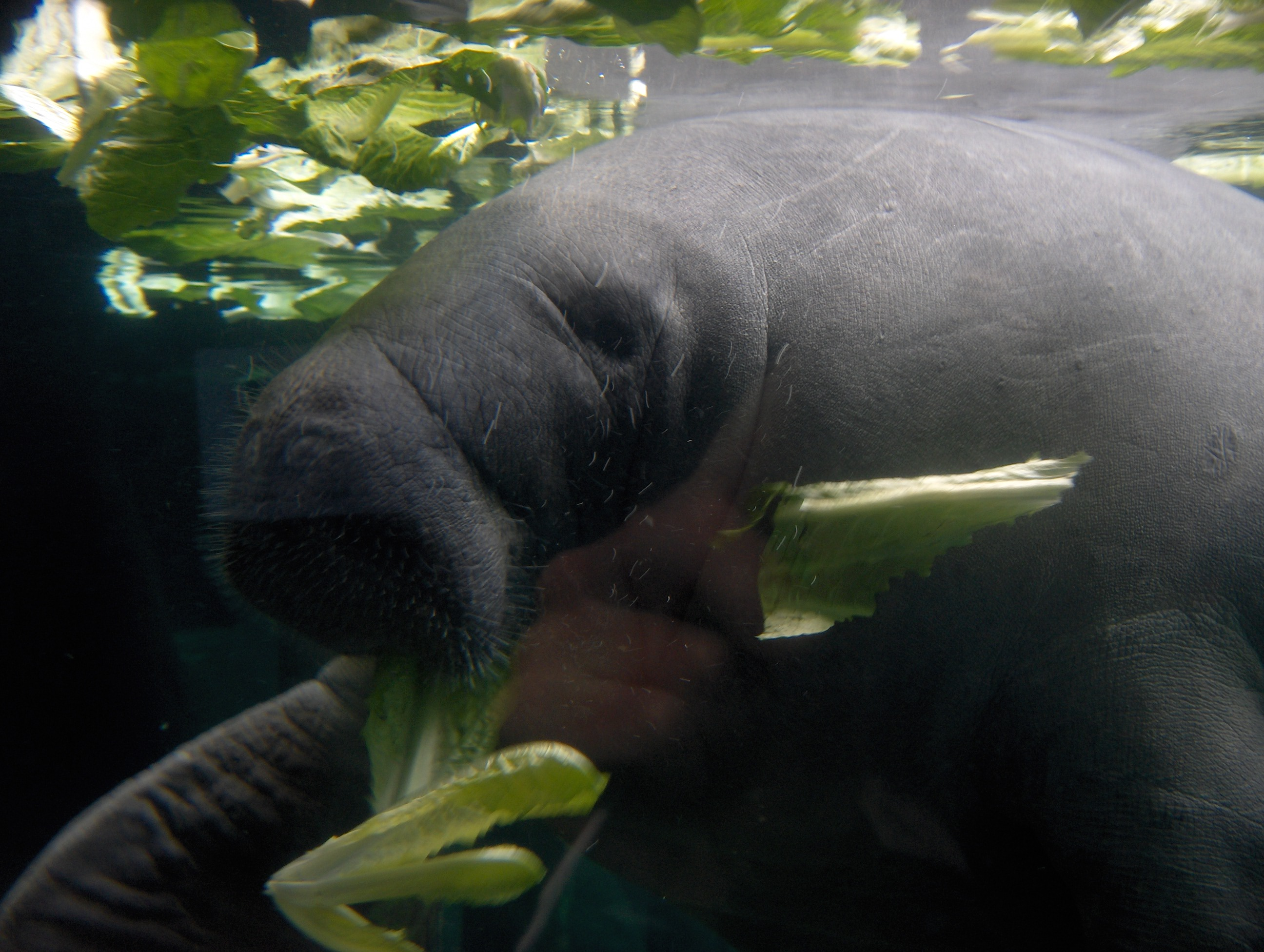
All the hairs of the manatee may be vibrissae

Manatees have sensitive tactile hairs that cover their bodies and faces called whiskers or vibrissae. Each individual hair is a vibrissal apparatus called a follicle-sinus complex. Vibrissae are blood filled sinuses bound by a dense connective tissue capsule with sensitive nerve endings that provides haptic feedback to the manatee.

Usually vibrissae are found on the facial regions of terrestrial and non-sirenian aquatic animals and are called whiskers. Manatees, however, have vibrissae all over their bodies. The vibrissae located in their facial region are roughly 30 times denser than the vibrissae on the rest of their body. Their mouth consists of very mobile prehensile lips which are used for grasping food and objects. The vibrissae on these lips are turned outward during grasping and are used in locating vegetation. Their oral disks also contain vibrissae which have been classified as bristle-like hairs that are used in nongrasping investigation of objects and food.

Manatee vibrissae are so sensitive that they are able to perform active touch discrimination of textures. Manatees also use their vibrissae to navigate the turbid waterways of their environment. Research has indicated that they are able to use these vibrissae to detect hydrodynamic stimuli in the same way that fish use their lateral line system.

== Reproduction ==
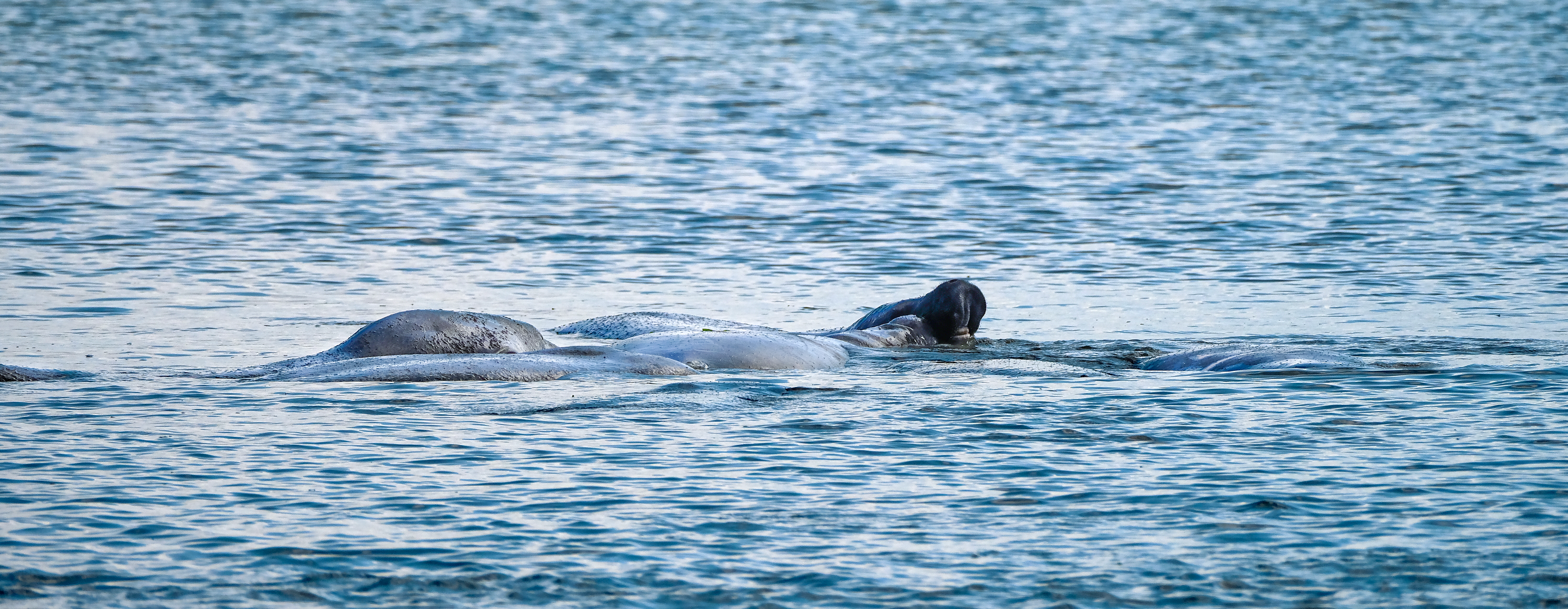
A manatee mating herd near Leffis Key, Florida.

Male manatees reach sexual maturity at 3–4 years of age, while females reach sexual maturity at 3–5 years of age. Manatees appear capable of breeding throughout their entire adult life, although most females first breed successfully at ages 7–9. Breeding occurs in ephemeral mating herds, where several males aggregate around an estrous female and compete for access to her. These mating herds can last up to 2 to 4 weeks. The estrous cycles of female manatees typically are approximately one month long. Females in captivity have been observed to skip cycles. Larger males, presumably older, have been observed to dominate mating herds and are likely responsible for most successful copulation events. However, between males and females there is a little sexual dimorphism where females are typically slightly larger than males.

The reproductive anatomy of males consists of internal testes within the abdominal cavity, which are located posterior to the kidneys. In the Florida manatee, males experience seasonal changes in their spermatogenesis. They are active during the warm breeding season; during this time all stages of spermatogenesis can be seen. However, during the cold non-breeding season, they are inactive, and spermatogenesis is inhibited. Recently there has been a study that shows support that males use chemosensation for the anal glands to locate females in estrous.

The reproductive anatomy of females is most like that of elephants. Female manatees resemble elephants in their zonary placenta, bicornuate uterus, and corpora albicantia. The female manatees' ovary gross morphology consists of an oval disk shape with a flat surface of the cortex. And since they are polyovular the ovulation scar is often challenging to identify.

The gestation period in manatees lasts for 12–14 months, after which they give birth to one calf at a time or, rarely, twins. When twins are born, they are fraternal twins and are dizygotic. When a calf is born, it usually weighs 60–70 lb (27–32 kg) and is 4.0–4.5 ft (1.2–1.4 m) long. Manatees do not form permanent pair bonds, and the male contributes no parental care to the calf, which remains with the mother for up to two years prior to weaning. Female manatees have two axillary mammary glands located under their flippers. The lactation period for mothers and their calves last typically for one to two years. Prior to weaning, there is an increase in the hormone progesterone in the mother. During this two-year period with their mother, calves learn how to locate warm water sources for winter and about migration routes for the summer seasons. A single female can reproduce once every 2–3 years, which is referred to as the calving interval. Wild manatees have been documented producing offspring into their late 30s, and a female captive manatee has given birth in her 40s.

Captive breeding programs are not being conducted for the Florida manatee due to conservation concerns that are being addressed in their natural environments. Until these concerns are rectified, a captive breeding program will not be beneficial for this species.

== Threats and conservation ==
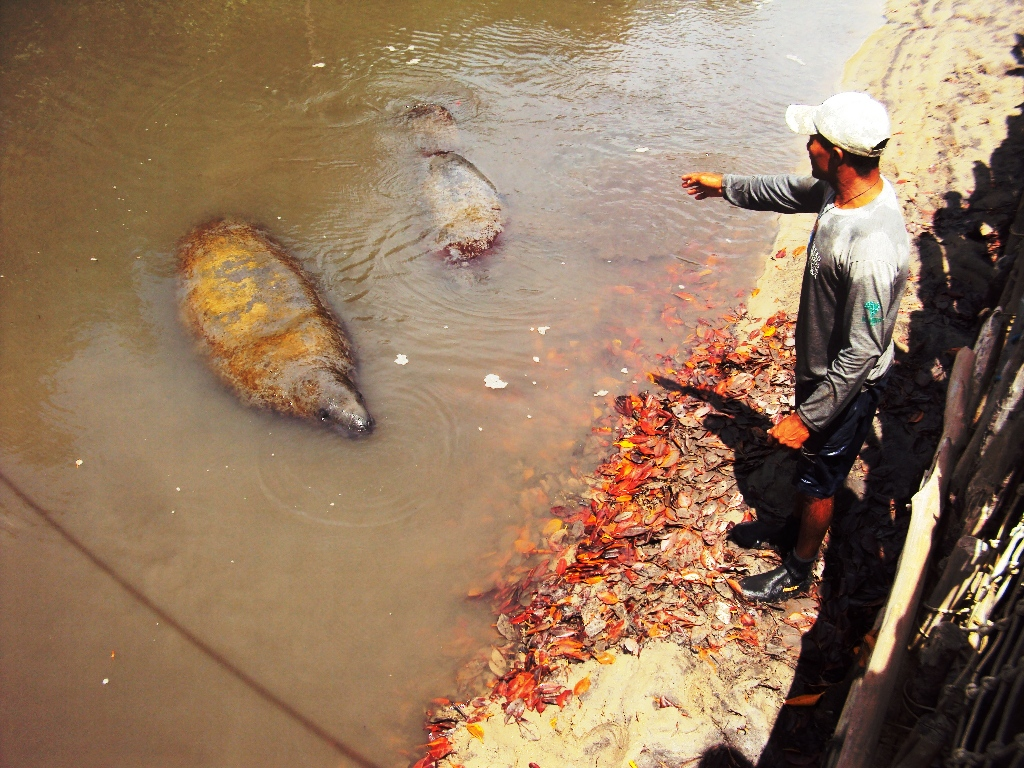
Manatees in a conservation project in Brazilian northeastern coast

The West Indian manatee has been included on the U.S. Endangered Species List since the 1970s. Late in 2023, the International Union for Conservation of Nature (IUCN) assessed the West Indian manatee and the Florida subspecies as vulnerable, and the Antillean subspecies as endangered. The full species and both subspecies qualified for their respective classifications due to a combination of a low number of mature individuals, and a significant projected decline in total population numbers over the next two generations (about 20 years per generation in manatees). Similarly, NatureServe considers both the Florida subspecies and the species as a whole as imperiled.

The Florida and Antillean subspecies face different threats, though some overlap. The largest causes of Florida manatee deaths can be attributed to collisions with watercraft, the loss of warm-water habitat, high perinatal mortality, entanglements and ingestion of debris, pollution, habitat loss, and harmful algae blooms (HABs), such as red tide. Antillean manatees face severe habitat fragmentation, as well as continued pressure from illegal hunting. In some countries, like Belize, collisions with watercraft are on the rise as tourism grows.

The 2017 decision to reclassify the West Indian manatee from endangered to threatened under the Endangered Species Act cited increases in the populations of both subspecies. The decision was not without controversy, however: According to Save the Manatee Club, the U.S. Fish and Wildlife Service failed to adequately consider data from 2010 to 2016, during which time manatees suffered from unprecedented mortality events linked to habitat pollution, dependence on artificial warm-water sources, and record deaths from watercraft strikes. The official notice of the reclassification made clear that, even with the downlisting, all federal protections for the West Indian manatee under the Endangered Species Act would remain in place. The West Indian manatee is also protected by the Florida Manatee Sanctuary Act of 1978 and the U.S. Marine Mammal Protection Act of 1972.

=== Threats ===
==== Shifting baselines ====
A factor in manatee conservation is the concept of shifting baselines, which refers to how perceptions of species abundance change over time. Modern conservation goals may drastically underestimate the historic abundance of the Florida manatee. Their research in historical ecology demonstrates that long-term human-induced changes have altered species compositions and ecosystem functions so significantly that traditional baselines may no longer be accurate or attainable. While the concept of Anthropocene baselines has been framed as a shift away from the constraints of historical references, the management of new ecosystems still requires data-supported estimates of historical ranges of variation in species abundance and distribution.

==== Historical exploitation ====
While modern conservation efforts aim to protect the West Indian manatee, it is important to acknowledge the species' long history of human exploitation, particularly in Brazil. Records beginning in 1935 until 1954 document that manatee hides were commercially exported to southern Brazil and beyond for the manufacturing of heavy-duty leather. This trade was followed by another surge in exploitation between 1954 and the legal banning of manatee hunting in 1973. During this period, it is estimated that over 1,000 manatees were slaughtered each year, leading to a sharp decline in population numbers, especially in coastal regions.

=== Conservation ===
==== Legal protections ====
In response to increasing threats such as boat collisions and habitat degradation, legal protections for manatees have expanded over time. A significant milestone occurred in 2004 when Florida officials established new slow-speed boating zones to protect manatees in key waterways. These regulations aimed to reduce fatal boat strikes, particularly important because manatees have limited hearing sensitivity and rely on visual detection of threats. Slower speeds allow both humans and manatees more time to react, thereby reducing accidents.

=== T. m. latirostris (Florida manatee) ===
A 1997 population viability analysis of the Florida manatee projected a 44% chance of extinction within the next 1,000 years without improvements in habitat conditions and new protective regulations. Since then, prospects for the subspecies have improved. In 2016, the U.S. Geological Survey collaborated with the Florida Fish and Wildlife Service to re-evaluate the status of the Florida manatee under the Core Biological Model, which is used to estimate population viability. This assessment analyzed total population on the east and west coasts of Florida and estimated that the likelihood of either population falling under 500 adults within 100 years was about 0.42%. The projected improvement of population numbers and stability is contingent on continued intervention and monitoring efforts.

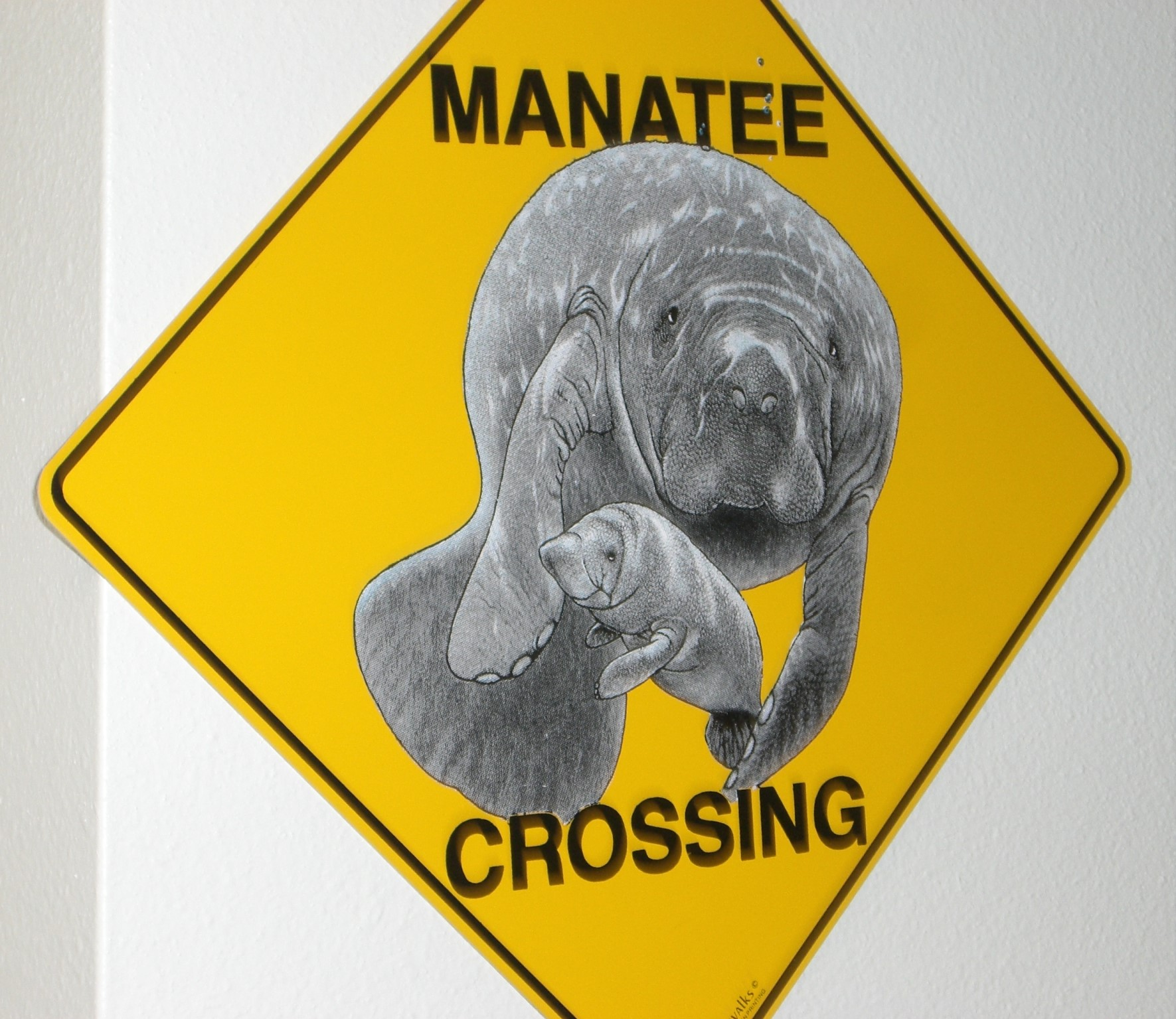
Manatee Crossing Sign from South Florida Museum

==== Collision with watercraft ====
Over 20% of manatee mortalities per year are a result of watercraft collisions. Between 1985 and 2017, 53% of adult-manatee mortalities were the result of boat strikes. 96% of adult Florida manatee carcasses have scars from a boat collision with some individuals showing signs of 10 or more boat strikes. Manatees can hear boats, but they oftentimes do not have enough time to get out of the way of a fast approaching boat. A boat going at a slower speed gives the manatee more time to react and move out of the way. Manatees respond to approaching vessels by orienting towards deeper waters and increasing their speed, but they are nevertheless frequently struck as they don't have the ability to swim very fast and, in shallow habitat, they oftentimes don't have anywhere to go to get out of the way. Over half of all watercraft deaths are caused by the impact trauma from the hull of a fast-speeding boat, whereas the remaining percentage is caused by the boat propeller. Aerial surveys of Florida manatee and boat distribution have been conducted to map the areas in which collisions are most likely to occur, accounting for environmental and seasonal factors. Watercraft can frequently avoid hitting manatees simply by reducing speed, allowing time for the manatee to escape out of range. Despite improvements in modeling and changes to local regulations, manatee mortalities from watercraft collisions continue to rise, with an all-time high of 137 recorded deaths in 2019.

==== Loss of warm-water habitat ====
Projected long-term loss of warm-water habitats presents a significant risk to manatees, which are unable to tolerate temperatures lower than 20 °C (68 °F) for prolonged periods of time. Florida manatees frequently congregate around natural warm-water springs, as well as the warm discharge given off by power plants throughout the winter months. However, as older plants are replaced with more energy-efficient structures, manatees could become at risk of cold-induced death due to reduced availability of warm-water refuges. Manatees exhibit high site fidelity and can recall previous refuge sites to which they frequently return in successive winters. Some conservationists fear that manatees may become overly reliant on warm-water locations generated by power plants that may shut down soon. Natural warm-water springs face problems from over-pumping of groundwater for human consumption, reduced spring flow, and nutrient pollution. In addition, some springs that were historically accessible to manatees are blocked off by dams or other structures. As Florida moves towards net zero by 2050, power companies will likely phase out these warm water discharges. Florida Climate Institute's Laying the Groundwork for 'Getting to Neutral' in the State of Florida project sets a foundation for a net-zero action planning effort in Florida by 2050. In areas where manatees lack access to power plants or natural warm springs, they instead seek out natural deep water zones that passively remain above tolerable temperatures.

==== Harmful algae blooms ====
Harmful algae blooms are an additional threat to manatees. Particularly Karenia brevis, which causes "red tide" pose a severe threat. Red tide is a common name for algal blooms, deriving its distinctive color from pigmentation molecules in the algae. The blooms produce brevetoxins which are potentially fatal to marine life. Red tides release brevetoxins, potent marine neurotoxins that can cause mass mortality events. Most manatee deaths from red tide occur when manatees inhale the toxins, or ingest the toxins when consuming seagrass, their primary food source. During a 1996 epizootic more than 150 manatees died from red tide exposure. Although manatees can survive exposure to red tide if rescued and rehabilitated in time, researchers fear that there might be long-term effects from sub-lethal red-tide exposure, which can affect the manatee's immune system through reduced lymphocyte proliferation response. In addition to red tide, blue/green and brown algae blooms triggered by excessive nutrient pollution from fertilizer, runoff, and leaking septic tanks can cloud the water. This results in seagrasses dying off since seagrasses and aquatic plants need light to photosynthesize. Manatees in turn may not be able to find sufficient food sources, which can lead to starvation. Manatees have experienced several Unusual Mortality Events (UMEs) over the years, which are usually related to either cold-stress syndrome, or brevetoxicosis from red tide. A current UME is ongoing along the Atlantic coast of Florida and is most likely related to a shortage in food sources.

==== Entanglement, entrapment and ingestion of debris ====
Manatees easily can get entangled in monofilament fishing line, crab traps, and other debris, which can lead to the loss of flippers and severe body wraps. In addition, they may also ingest a variety of debris, such as plastics, cloth, fishing gear, and other items. Manatees can also get crushed by flood control structures and locks and may get entrapped behind weirs or other structures, especially after heavy rainfall. Some manatees have gotten trapped in culverts and pipes and needed intervention.

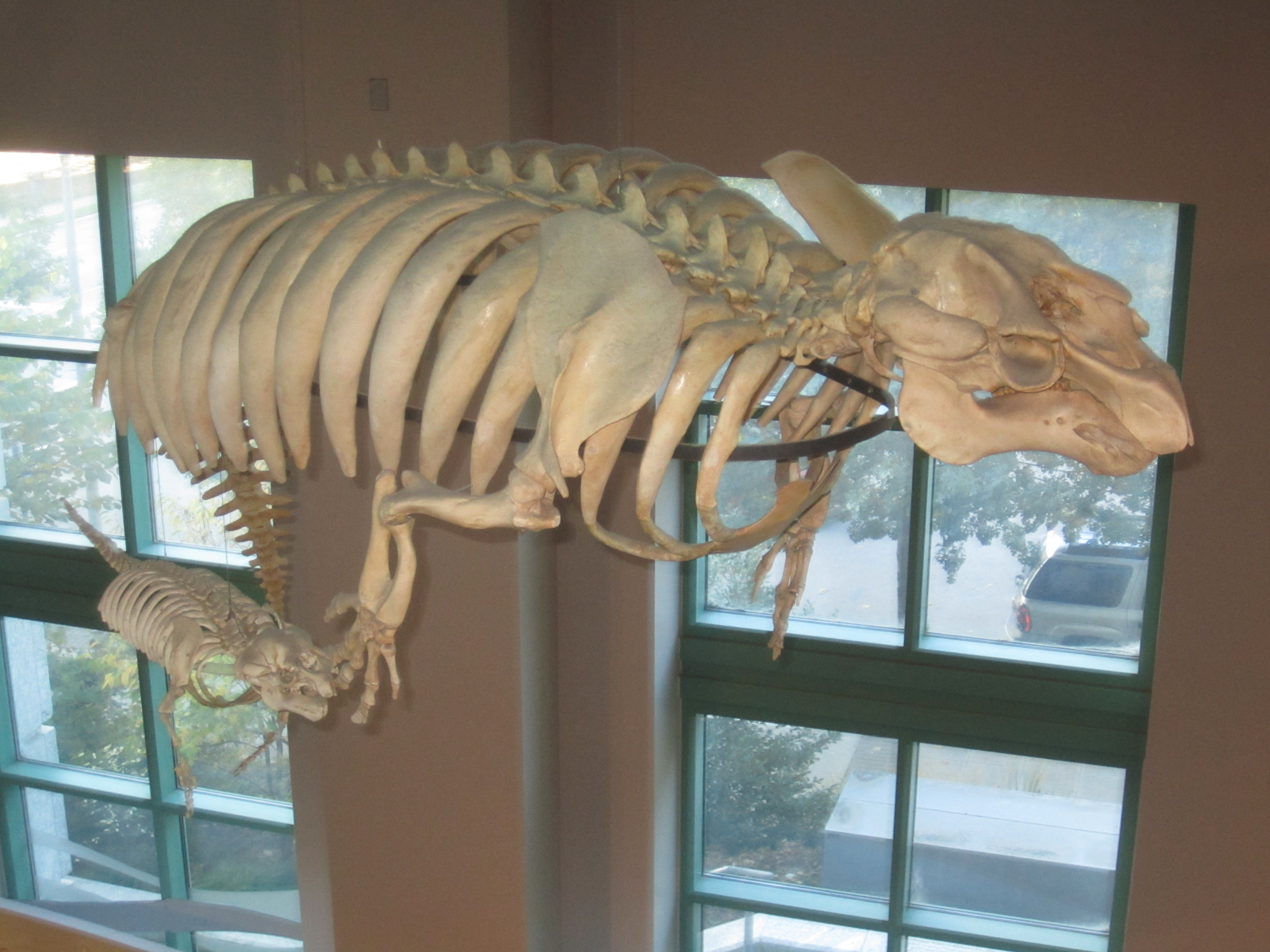
West Indian manatee skeletons on display at the North Carolina Museum of Natural Sciences in Raleigh, North Carolina

=== T. m. manatus (Antillean manatee) ===
There is relatively little data on the Antillean manatee compared to its Florida counterpart. Phylogenetic studies on the Antillean manatee have revealed low genetic diversity among its populations, likely due to limitations on dispersal. Captive breeding, as well as the rehabilitation of manatee calves discovered without their mothers nearby, can supplement local conservation strategies, but populations are nevertheless at risk of inbreeding depression and local extinction.

Whereas the population trends of the Florida manatee are relatively well monitored, population data for the Antillean manatee is sparse due to its patchy distribution, as well as the relative turbidity and low levels of light in its habitat which can mitigate the effectiveness of aerial or sonar-based surveys, often resulting in inaccurate or erroneous measurements. A 2016 study on the Antillean manatee population of Brazil found a potential range for current population size between 485 and 2,221 individuals. The U.S. Fish and Wildlife Service estimated in 2017 that as many as 6,782 individuals might exist in the Antillean subspecies, but these results rely in large part on personal anecdotes and may overestimate the true population number. A 2012 study of the Antillean population documented significant human-related causes of mortality, and projected that if the share of human-caused manatee deaths per year rose to 5% or more, the population would face a severe decline and eventual extinction.
