= Manatee conservation =

Organizations and work supporting manatee welfare

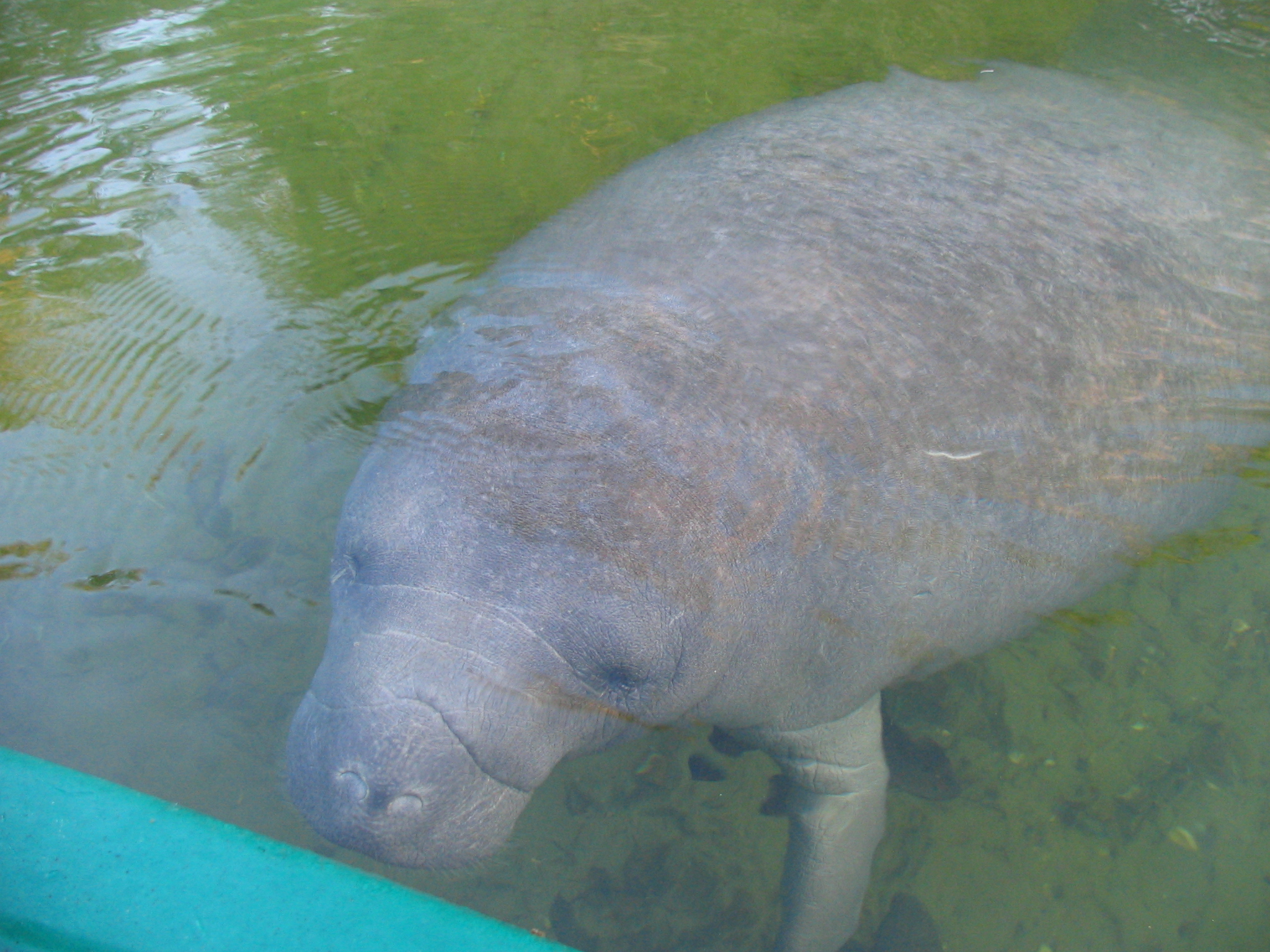
This individual inspects a kayak situation

Manatees are large marine mammals that inhabit slow rivers, canals, saltwater bays, estuaries, and coastal areas. They are a migratory species, inhabiting the Florida waters during the winter and moving as far north as Virginia and into the Chesapeake Bay, sometimes seen as far north as Baltimore, Maryland and as far west as Texas in the warmer summer months. Manatees are calm herbivores that spend most of their time eating, sleeping, and traveling. They have a lifespan of about 60 years with no known natural predators. Some of their deaths are the result of human activity. In the past, manatees were exploited for their meat, fat, and hides.

== Sources of danger ==
Various human activities threaten manatee populations. There is some cultural significance in certain areas of South America and the Caribbean that manatees have been used as a food source since pre-Columbian times. In these areas and the Amazon basin manatees are a center point of folklore and local myths since before European expansion. While manatees are not hunted as a food source in many areas there is a history of hunting and poaching in areas such as Brazil and the West Indies. Fishing nets and lines can cause injuries to manatees that can lead to serious infections. Studies have shown that around 14% of manatees since 1978 have been found with debris in their GI tract which mainly consisted of fishing lines. Some manatees have also been shown to have missing or scared fins due to their entanglement in these fishing lines.

Some manatee deaths are the result of collisions with boats. In a study done in Florida in 2002 it was found that collisions with boats makes up 25% of deaths of manatees but when surveyed the boaters in Florida responded positively to learning more about manatee conservation and their habits in boating areas. Additionally, fertilizer runoff, leaking septic tanks, waste water discharges can trigger algae blooms which kills off a lot of seagrass which manatees depend on for food. One study has found that metal concentration in the blood of manatees found in Florida and Belize needs to be studied and needs a baseline of metal concentrations. It was found that there were significant differences in certain metals such as copper and zinc for manatees in different areas as well as differences in wild and rehabilitating, captured manatees. These differences provide necessary information about the health of manatees for clinicians in rehabilitation centers in order to properly care for the manatees.

Manatees tend to gather in the warm water outflows of power plants and springs during cold weather. Manatees are not adaptable to colder waters, therefore, if they do not make it to warmer waters in time for winter they can undergo cold stress. These animals have an exceptionally low metabolic rate and poor insulation which in turns does not allow them to thermoregulate in cold waters. According to Florida Fish and Wildlife, the 2023 Preliminary Manatee Mortality Report shows that the main reasons for manatee mortality was boat collisions and cold stress. Manatees have shown in certain studies that manatee cognition is very good and that have much more complex social skills than previously known and requires more research to be done.

== Becoming endangered and legal protection ==
Starting in the 18th century when the English declared Florida a manatee sanctuary and made manatee hunting illegal, people have worked to protect this species. In 1893, manatees first received protection under Florida law, and in 1907 this law was revised to impose a fine of $500 and/or six months of jail time for assaulting or killing a manatee. In accordance with the Endangered Species Preservation Act of 1966, an act of Congress designed to list endangered animal species and offer them limited protection, the manatee became one of 78 original species listed as being threatened with extinction. There are currently more than 1300 species on this list. On March 11, 1967, federal efforts to protect the manatee began when the United States Fish and Wildlife Service listed the manatee as endangered on the ICUN Red List.

In 1972, the manatee was designated a marine mammal protected under the Federal Marine Mammal Protection Act. This act prohibited the removal of any marine mammal and imposed a fine of up to $2000 and/or one year in jail for doing so. The Endangered Species Act of 1969 was revised in 1973 and increased federal protection of manatees. The “act made it a violation to harass, harm, pursue, hunt, shoot, wound, kill, capture, or collect an endangered species…authorized cooperative agreements between states and the federal government with funding management, research and law enforcement.” This act also includes touching or feeding an endangered species. If manatees were getting fed from people, especially people on boats, that gives the manatee a positive reaction with people and boats and would more cause them to approach those things more. This in turn would cause further mortality form boat collisions and/or net entanglement.

In 1974, the Sirenia Project was established in Gainesville, Florida to provide manatee documentation and rescue programs. In 1976, Sea World of Florida began a Manatee Rescue and Rehabilitation Program. The Florida Manatee Sanctuary Act passed in 1978, amending the 1907 state law. Florida became an official refuge and sanctuary for the marine mammals, and the regulation of boat speeds in areas of manatee inhabitation became allowed. In that same year, the U. S. Fish and Wildlife Service, Florida Audubon Society, and Sea World also sponsored the “West Indian Manatee Workshop” in which six management recommendations were proposed: regulations to control boaters and divers, land acquisition for refuges, study of potential artificial refuges, explore technological control mechanisms to protect manatees, develop oil spill contingency plans, and increase public education.

In 1979, Florida Governor Bob Graham made November Manatee Awareness Month, and the first state-designated protection zones were established. The year 1980 saw Congress allocate $100, 000 to the Marine Mammal Commission and the development of the initial Federal Manatee Recovery Plan by the U. S. Fish and Wildlife Service. In 1981, Bob Graham and Jimmy Buffett formed the Save the Manatee Committee, the precursor of the Save the Manatee Club, which sought to protect manatees and their habitats. Both the Marine Mammal Protection Act and the Endangered Species Act were reauthorized in 1988 as various new groups, companies, and organizations began to invest time and resources in the protection of the manatee. The early 1990s saw more government money being allocated to the cause, more research being conducted, and more protection plans being implemented.

The U.S. Fish and Wildlife Service revised the Manatee Recovery Plan Objectives in 1996 to include the following: assess and minimize causes of manatee mortality and injury, protect essential habitat, determine and monitor the status of the manatee population and essential habitat, coordinate, and oversee cooperative recovery work. Throughout the early 2000s (decade), various counties in Florida continued to revise and/or create specific conservation plans in conjunction with federal and statewide efforts.

As of January 7, 2016, as a result of significant improvements in its population and habitat conditions, and reductions in direct threats, the U.S. Fish and Wildlife Service announced that the West Indian manatee is proposed to be downlisted from endangered to threatened status under the Endangered Species Act (ESA). The proposal to downlist the manatee to threatened will not affect federal protections currently afforded by the ESA, and the Service remains committed to conservation actions to fully recover manatee populations. The range-wide minimum known population is estimated to be at least 13,000 manatees, with more than 6,300 in Florida. When aerial surveys began in 1991, there were only an estimated 1,267 manatees in Florida, meaning that the last 25 years has seen a 400 percent increase in the species population in that state.

However, there has been an Unusual Mortality Event (UME) beginning in December 2020 where more manatee carcasses and more manatees requiring rescues were appearing at a higher rate. Preliminary data released from Florida Wildlife Conservation showed a total of 1,191 manatee mortalities in 2021. This number is nearly twice the total of mortality in 2020. Although some of these mortalities were due to cold stress or boat collisions, a majority of them were from starvation due to loss of sea grass. It has been hypothesized that poor water quality in surrounding areas has led to a mass mortality in seagrass. Due to this, it has been largely debated by many environmental organizations if these manatees should be put back on the endangered species list.

== Organizations ==
Various institutes help promote awareness of the threats faced by manatees, raise money for manatee research, and generally work to ensure the survival of this endangered species. One of the largest and most influential organizations is the Save the Manatee Club. This non-profit organization was created by Bob Graham and Jimmy Buffett as a means of including the public in manatee conservation. The club sponsors an Adopt-A-Manatee program that uses it funds for “public awareness and education projects; manatee research; rescue and rehabilitation efforts; and advocacy and legal action in order to ensure better protection for manatees and their habitat.” It also sponsors various public awareness, education, and volunteer activities.

Sirenian International is another organization dedicated to the conservation of manatees. The group considers itself a “partnership of scientists, students, educators, conservationists, and the public” that sponsors various projects throughout the world. Membership is divided into three groups based upon financial contributions and active service to the organization: participating member, supporting member, and contributing member.

SeaWorld of Florida has played a major role in the efforts to protect and conserve the manatees. Sea World has the authority to rescue and rehabilitate manatees, and has had a great deal of success doing so. The theme park has an exhibit titled “Manatees: The Last Generation?” aimed at educating guests about the importance of protecting this endangered species.

One of the most popular efforts to raise money for manatee research and conservation is the sale of license plates by the Florida Fish and Wildlife Conservation Commission. The proceeds of these sales make up a large percentage of the funds dedicated to this cause, having raised $34,000,000 since 1990. Money collected from decal sales, boat registration fees, and voluntary donations also contribute to the Save the Manatee Trust Fund. A newly redesigned license plate was released in December 2007.

Manatee Appreciation Day is celebrated on the last Wednesday of March in the United States. Florida celebrates Manatee Awareness Month during November, which has been endorsed by comedian Alec Baldwin.

== Conservation outside of the United States ==
The conservation of manatees is not only an issue in the US, as anthropogenic actions have caused the decline of this species worldwide. In order to curve the decline of these animals, more conservation efforts have sprouted in other nations.

For example, Belize houses some of the largest populations of the Antillean manatees in the Caribbean, and so their influence on these animals is fairly large. Initially monitoring of the animals showed that the manatee population size was stagnant, so there was no loss in numbers, but also no increase, and with the increase of human influence, the populations were likely to suffer in the future. In order to combat and prevent the loss of these animals, the Belize government has created special laws to protect the manatees. One example would be the Manatee Protection Ordinances, which prohibit any human interactions that could be harmful to these animals, like feeding them, hunting them or chasing them. Belize also has the Wildlife Protection Act, which was established in 1981, and calls for the protection of the manatees under section 4. This protection of the manatees and their lands has allowed for their populations to be sustained.

In other countries, the focus has been more on the repopulation side of conservation. For example, in Mexico, zoos and parks have taken injured and dying manatees in and rehabilitated them. These parks have taken in manatees from around the Caribbean and helped them to heal from the injuries they sustained. While in captivity, a captive breeding program was started to try and encourage the growth of these populations. Some have been successful but due to the nature of the manatee reproduction process, it is not the most sustainable way to increase the population size. Because of this, they are also enacting laws to try and protect the manatees and their habitats so less animals will need to be rehabilitated to recover from injuries sustained from humans.

Another example of some manatee conservation efforts in the Atlantic can be seen in Brazil with their Manatee Reintroduction Programme. For this project, the Brazilian government rehabilitated six manatees and then released them with trackers. These trackers allowed the scientists to see where the manatees spent most of their time. This allowed the government officials to plan out conservation areas that would be most beneficial to these species and enact laws to protect them.

More laws and programs like these can be seen throughout the Caribbean and the oceans the manatees inhabit, as these species are endangered and need to be protected in order to guarantee their survival.
