= Save the Manatee Club =

U.S. nonprofit organization

- Save the Manatee Club Inc.
- Abbreviation: SMC
- Formation: 1981; 45 years ago
- Founder: Jimmy Buffett; Bob Graham
- Type: Nonprofit
- Tax ID no.: 59-3131709
- Legal status: 501(c)(3)
- Headquarters: Longwood, Florida
- Key people: Patrick Rose (Executive Director)
- Website: https://savethemanatee.org/

Save the Manatee Club (SMC) is a 501(c)(3) non-profit group and membership organization dedicated to the conservation of manatees. The organization was founded in 1981 by singer and songwriter Jimmy Buffett, and Governor of Florida (and later U.S. Senator) Bob Graham. There are currently about 40,000 active members of SMC.

Save the Manatee Club raises funds from the Adopt-A-Manatee program to go toward public awareness and education projects, manatee research, rescue and rehabilitation efforts, and advocacy and legal action to ensure better protection for manatees and their habitat. The club has also assisted state and federal governments with research projects in Florida such as aerial surveys, seagrass studies, telemetry studies, manatee photo identification projects, population modeling and the compilation of over twenty years of research on the population of Blue Spring manatees.

== International efforts ==
Save the Manatee Club provides funds, supplies, and other essential equipment to Belize's only manatee rehabilitation facility. SMC has assisted the Puerto Rico Manatee Conservation Center in raising critical funds needed to repair damage sustained by Hurricane Maria. They also partner with villages in Nigeria, part of the West African manatee’s habitat.

== Downlisting ==
Pacific Legal Foundation (PLF), on behalf of Save Crystal River, Inc., petitioned the United States Fish and Wildlife Service (FWS) to downlist the West Indian Manatee (Trichechus manatus) from an endangered to threatened species. PLF contends that FWS has a legal duty under the Endangered Species Act (ESA) to implement this reclassification, because the species no longer qualifies as endangered.

On March 30, 2017, FWS issued its final rule to downgrade the status of the West Indian manatee from endangered to threatened under the ESA. The rule affects both the Florida and Antillean subspecies and was pursued despite strong scientific and legal evidence that shows the downlisting of manatees is not warranted at this time. SMC believes the FWS decision failed to adequately consider data from 2010 to 2016, during which time manatees suffered from unprecedented mortality events linked to habitat pollution, dependence on artificial warm water sources, and record deaths from watercraft strikes. SMC is currently active in opposing the downlisting.

According to the FWS the criteria that need to be meet in order to add a species to the endangered species list, and to keep them there are: 1. the present or threatened destruction, modification, or curtailment of its habitat or range; 2. overutilization for commercial, recreational, scientific, or educational purposes; 3. disease or predation; 4. the inadequacy of existing regulatory mechanisms; 5. other natural or man-made factors affecting its survival. Any one of these conditions is adequate to add a species to the list. However, manatees, and the Florida manatee in particular, are still at substantial risk from habitat loss and motorboat accidents. Additionally, a red tide outbreak at the beginning of 2016 and throughout 2018, and a shortage of FWS personnel to appropriately enforce its regulations regarding endangered species, put the manatee at even greater risk.
