= Trichechus hesperamazonicus =

Trichechus hesperamazonicus Temporal range: Late Pleistocene

Scientific classification
- Kingdom: Animalia
- Phylum: Chordata
- Class: Mammalia
- Order: Sirenia
- Family: Trichechidae
- Genus: Trichechus
- Species: †T. hesperamazonicus

Binomial name
- †Trichechus hesperamazonicus Perini, Nascimento & Cozzuol 2020

Extinct species of manatee

Trichechus hesperamazonicus, the western Amazonian manatee, is an extinct species of manatee that lived about 40 thousand years ago in the Madeira River, in the Brazilian state of Rondônia. It is known from this single locality, with possible occurrences in the Brazilian state of Acre.

== Description ==
Trichechus hesperamazonicus is known by two fragmentary mandibles and part of the palate. Compared with other manatees, it has a wide space between the posterior lower tooth row and ascending ramus of dentary, where the buccinator muscle is located, and a wide ascending ramus of the mandible, which covers the posterior end of the tooth row. It also shares some characteristics with living species, as relatively few large teeth and few mental foramina as T. manatus and T. senegalensis (in contrast with the many smaller teeth and many mental foramina of T. inunguis) and a straight and shallow mandibular symphysis as T. inunguis and T. senegalensis (in contrast with the downturned snout and deep mandibular symphysis of T. manatus). The affinities of this species are still not fully resolved, being recovered in a polytomy with T. inunguis and a clade formed by T. manatus and T. senegalensis:

- - - - †Potamosiren magdalenensis
      - - †Ribodon limbatus
        - - †Trichechus hesperamazonicus
          - Trichechus inunguis
          - - Trichechus senegalensis
            - Trichechus manatus

== Distribution ==
The Latin name hesperamazonicus refers to the western localization of the species, hesperos (west) and amazonicus (from the Amazon region). The fossil was found near the village of Araras, in Nova Mamoré, state of Rondônia, Brazil. Since the Rio Madeira Formation. The site also yielded pampatheres, a fossil species of tapir and the podocnemidid river turtle Peltocephalus maturin.^{14}C dates from associated wood samples give an age of 44,710 ± 880 years before present. At that time, the Madeira River had slow currents and many marginal lakes. At the end of the Pleistocene, changes on the river regime originated several rapids, creating an environment unsuitable to manatees, that are currently absent from the region.
