= Dwarf manatee =

Conservation status
- CITES Appendix I

Scientific classification (disputed)
- Kingdom: Animalia
- Phylum: Chordata
- Class: Mammalia
- Order: Sirenia
- Family: Trichechidae
- Genus: Trichechus
- Species: T. pygmaeus

Binomial name
- Trichechus pygmaeus van Roosmalen and Van der Vlist, 2015

Disputed species of mammal

The dwarf manatee (Trichechus pygmaeus, or mistakenly Trichechus bernhardi) is a disputed species of manatee allegedly found in the freshwater habitats of the Amazon, though restricted to one tributary of the Aripuanã River. According to Marc van Roosmalen, the scientist who proposed it as a new species, it lives in shallow, fast-running water, and feeds on different species of aquatic plants from the Amazonian manatee, which prefers deeper, slower-moving waters and the plants found there. The dwarf manatee reportedly migrates upriver during the rainy season when the river floods to the headwaters and shallow ponds. Based on its small range, the dwarf manatee is suggested to be considered critically endangered if indeed a separate species, but is not recognized by the IUCN.

The dwarf manatee is described as typically being about 130 cm (4.3 ft) long and weighing about 60 kg (130 lb), which would make it the smallest extant sirenian. It is supposedly very dark, almost black, with a white patch on the abdomen. It may actually represent an immature Amazonian manatee, but it is reported to differ in proportions and colour. It is, however, at least very closely related, as mtDNA has failed to reveal any difference between the two. Mutation rates in manatees – if the dwarf manatee is distinct – suggests a divergence time of less than 485,000 years. Daryl Domning, a Smithsonian Institution research associate and one of the world's foremost experts on manatee evolution, has stated that the DNA evidence actually proves that these are merely immature Amazonian manatees.

== Taxonomy ==
The original description was submitted for publication to Nature, but it was rejected, and it was eventually published in the Biodiversity Journal in 2015.
