= Manatee of Helena =

Creature believed to inhabit the coast of Saint Helena

The Manatee of Helena is a creature believed to have once inhabited the coast of Saint Helena, an island supposed to be largely populated by manatees during the days of colonization. Unlike known manatee species, Helena manatees were semi-aquatic, often coming onto land like seals. There is no evidence to prove its existence, and only two eyewitness accounts have been reported. John Charles Melliss in his 1875 work St. Helena suggested that the manatees were likely a local population of the African manatee, while saying it would also be possible that the population originated from the West Indian manatee. Misidentified seals have been suggested as a potential origin for the Manatee of Helena. Southern elephant seals historically bred on the island, and has been suggested as the origin. While Ole Theodor Jensen Mortensen in his research on the matter suggested that they were most likely misidentified Cape fur seals, in part due to the unsuitability of the habitat for manatees.
