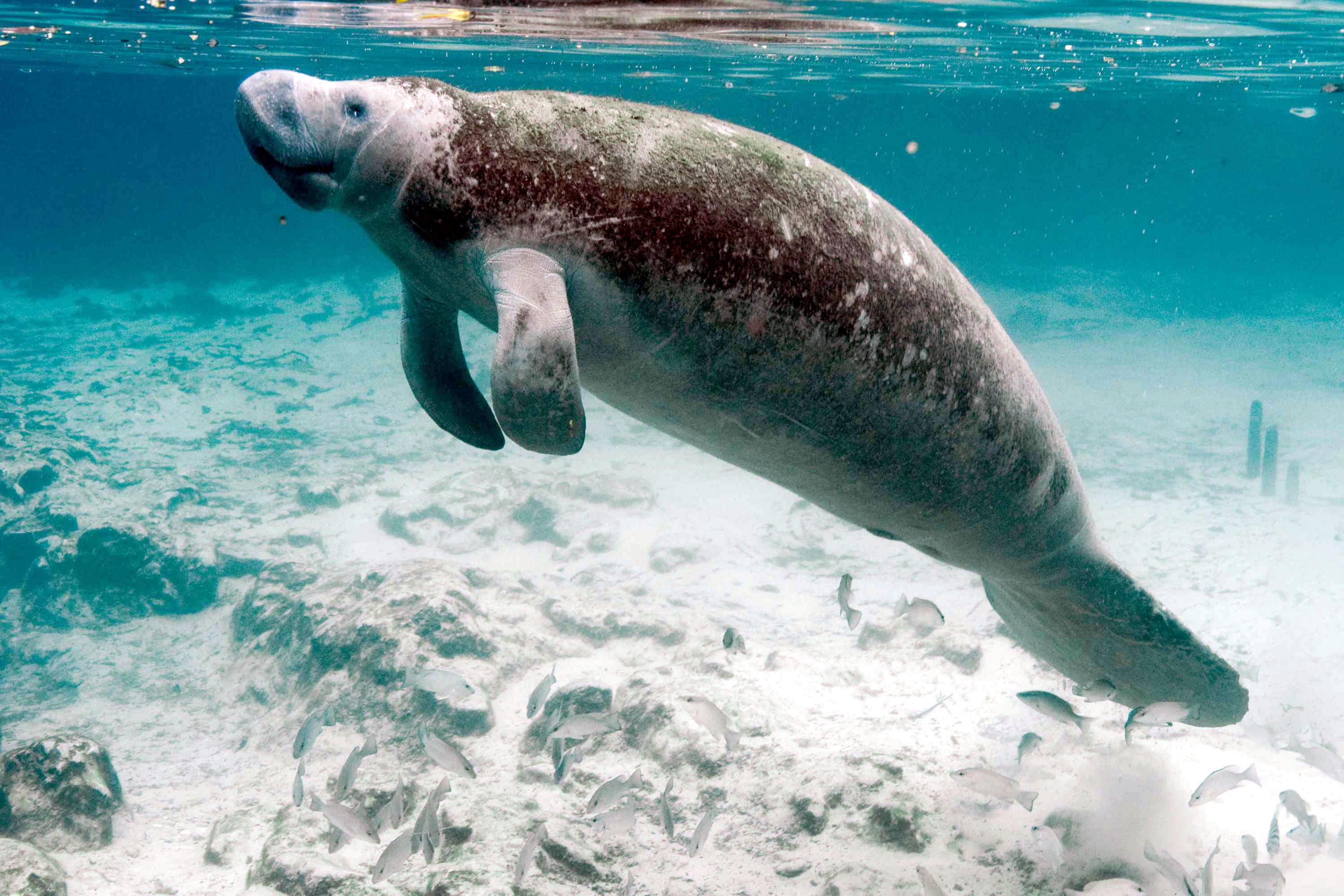
- West Indian manatee (Trichechus manatus)

Scientific classification
- Kingdom: Animalia
- Phylum: Chordata
- Class: Mammalia
- Order: Sirenia
- Family: Trichechidae
- Subfamily: Trichechinae
- Genus: Trichechus; Linnaeus, 1758

Type species
- Trichechus manatus Linnaeus, 1758

Species
- Trichechus hesperamazonicus †; Trichechus inunguis; Trichechus manatus; Trichechus senegalensis; Trichechus "pygmaeus" (validity questionable)

Synonyms
- Halipaedisca Gistel 1848; Manatus Brunnich 1772; Neodermus Rafinesque 1815; Oxystomus Fischer von Waldheim 1803

= Manatee =

Manatees Temporal range: Early Pleistocene – Recent 2.5–0 Ma

Genus of mammals

Manatees (/ˈmænətiːz/, family Trichechidae, genus Trichechus) are large, fully aquatic, mostly herbivorous marine mammals sometimes known as sea cows. There are three accepted living species of Trichechidae, representing three of the four living species in the order Sirenia: the Amazonian manatee (Trichechus inunguis), the West Indian manatee (Trichechus manatus), and the West African manatee (Trichechus senegalensis). They measure up to 4.0 metres (13 ft 1 in) long, weigh as much as 590 kilograms (1,300 lb), and have paddle-like tails.

Manatees are herbivores and eat over 60 different freshwater and saltwater plants. Manatees inhabit the shallow, marshy coastal areas and rivers of the Caribbean Sea, the Gulf of Mexico, the Amazon basin, and West Africa.

The main causes of death for manatees are human-related issues, such as habitat destruction and human objects. Their slow-moving, curious nature has led to violent collisions with propeller-driven boats and ships. Some manatees have been found with over 50 scars on them from propeller blades. Natural causes of death include adverse temperatures, predation by crocodiles on young, and disease.

== Etymology ==
The etymology of the name is unclear, with connections having been made to Latin manus "hand" and to the term manaty "breast" from the Carib language of native South Americans. The Carib term may refer to the mammary glands of the manatee, which are located on their chests under their armpits. The term sea cow is a reference to the species' slow, peaceful, herbivorous nature, reminiscent of that of bovines. Lamantin (from French lamantin) was commonly used as an alternative name until the 20th century.

== Taxonomy ==
Manatees are three of the four living species in the order Sirenia. The fourth is the Eastern Hemisphere's dugong. A preexisting member of the order known as Steller's sea cow was hunted to extinction in the eighteenth century. The Sirenia are thought to have evolved from four-legged land mammals more than 60 million years ago, with the closest living relatives being the Proboscidea (elephants) and Hyracoidea (hyraxes).

== Description ==
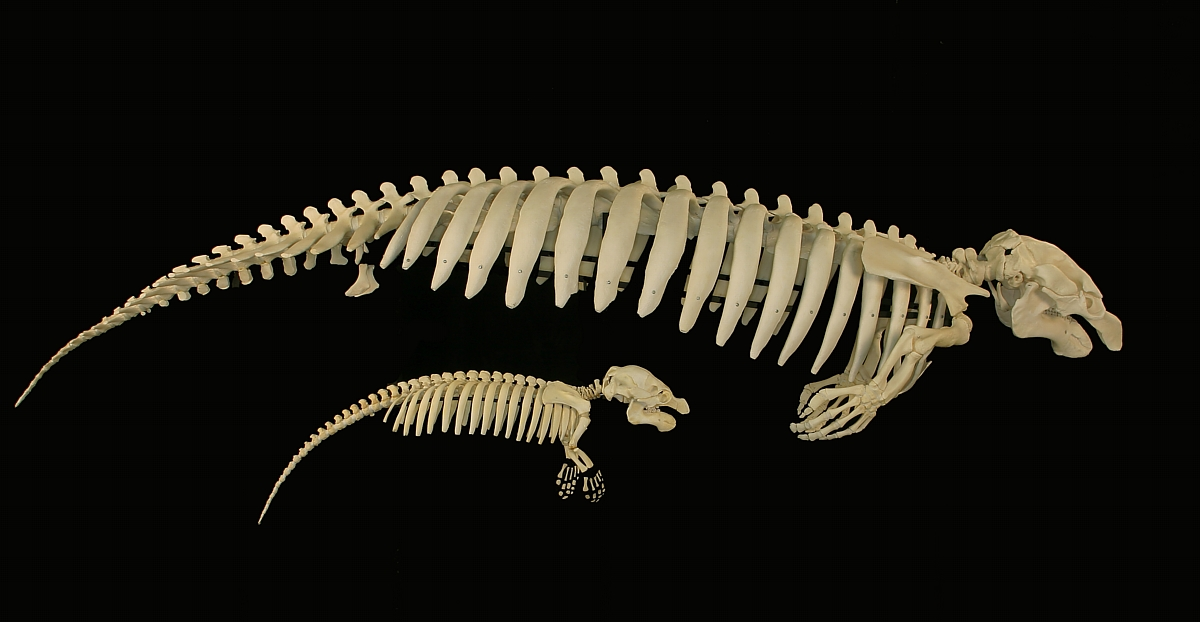
A skeleton of a manatee and calf, the Museum of Osteology, Oklahoma City

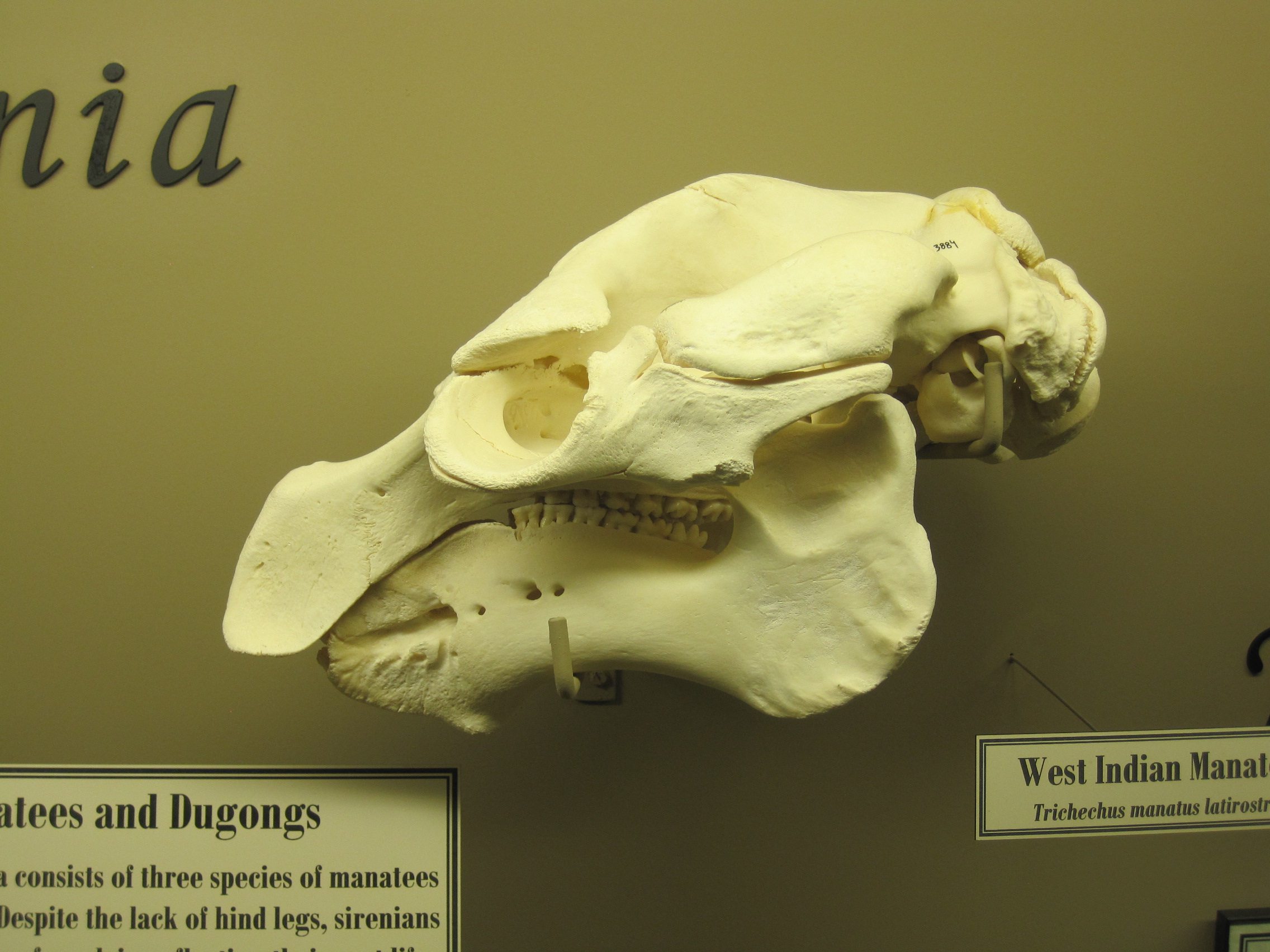
Skull of a West Indian manatee, the Museum of Osteology, Oklahoma City

The life span of manatees is long, as they can live more than thirty years. Manatees weigh 400 to 550 kg (880 to 1,210 lb), and average 2.8 to 3.0 m (9 ft 2 in to 9 ft 10 in) in length, sometimes growing to 4.6 m (15 ft 1 in) and 1,775 kg (3,913 lb) and females tend to be larger and heavier than males. At birth, baby manatees weigh about 30 kg (66 lb) each. The female manatee has two teats, one under each flipper, a characteristic that was used to make early links between the manatee and elephants.

The lids of manatees' small, widely spaced eyes close in a circular manner. The manatee has a large, flexible, prehensile upper lip, used to gather food and eat and for social interaction and communication. Manatees have shorter snouts than their fellow sirenians, the dugongs.

Manatee adults have no incisor or canine teeth, just a set of cheek teeth, which are not clearly differentiated into molars and premolars. These teeth are repeatedly replaced throughout life, with new teeth growing at the rear as older teeth fall out from farther forward in the mouth, somewhat as elephants' teeth do. At any time, a manatee typically has no more than six teeth in each jaw of its mouth.

The manatee's tail is paddle-shaped, and is the clearest visible difference between manatees and dugongs; a dugong tail is fluked, similar in shape to that of a whale.

The manatee is unusual among mammals in having just six cervical vertebrae, a number that may be due to mutations in the homeotic genes. All other mammals have seven cervical vertebrae, other than the two-toed and three-toed sloths.

Like the horse, the manatee has a simple stomach, but a large cecum, in which it can digest tough plant matter. Generally, the intestines are about 45 meters, unusually long for an animal of the manatee's size.

=== Evolution ===
Fossil remains of manatee ancestors – also known as sirenians – date back to the Early Eocene. It is thought that they reached the isolated area of the South American continent and became known as Trichechidae. In the Late Miocene, trichechids were likely restricted in South American coastal rivers and they fed on many freshwater plants. Dugongs inhabited the West Atlantic and Caribbean waters and fed on seagrass meadows instead. As the sea grasses began to grow, manatees adapted to the changing environment by growing supernumerary molars. Sea levels lowered and increased erosion and silt runoff was caused by glaciation. This increased the tooth wear of the bottom-feeding manatees.

== Behavior ==
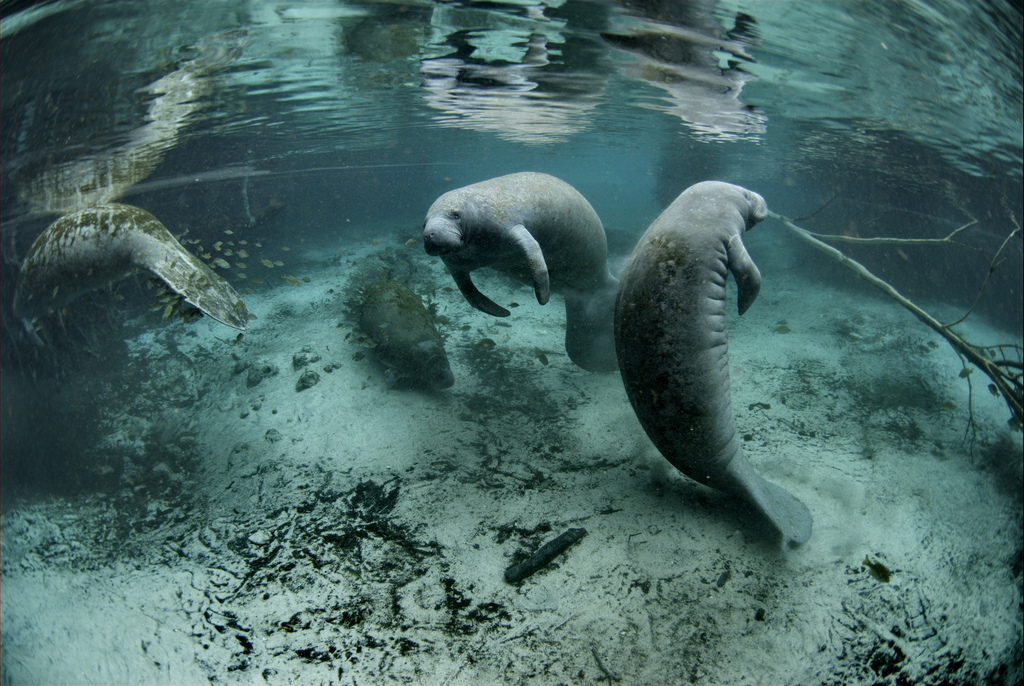
Endangered Florida manatee (Trichechus manatus)

Apart from mothers with their young, or males following a receptive female, manatees are generally solitary animals. Manatees spend approximately 50% of the day sleeping submerged, surfacing for air regularly at intervals of less than 20 minutes. The remainder of the time is mostly spent grazing in shallow waters at depths of 1–2 m (3 ft 3 in – 6 ft 7 in). The Florida subspecies (T. m. latirostris) has been known to live up to 60 years.

=== Locomotion ===
Generally, manatees swim at about 5 to 8 km/h (3 to 5 mph). However, they have been known to swim at up to 30 km/h (20 mph) in short bursts.

=== Intelligence and learning ===
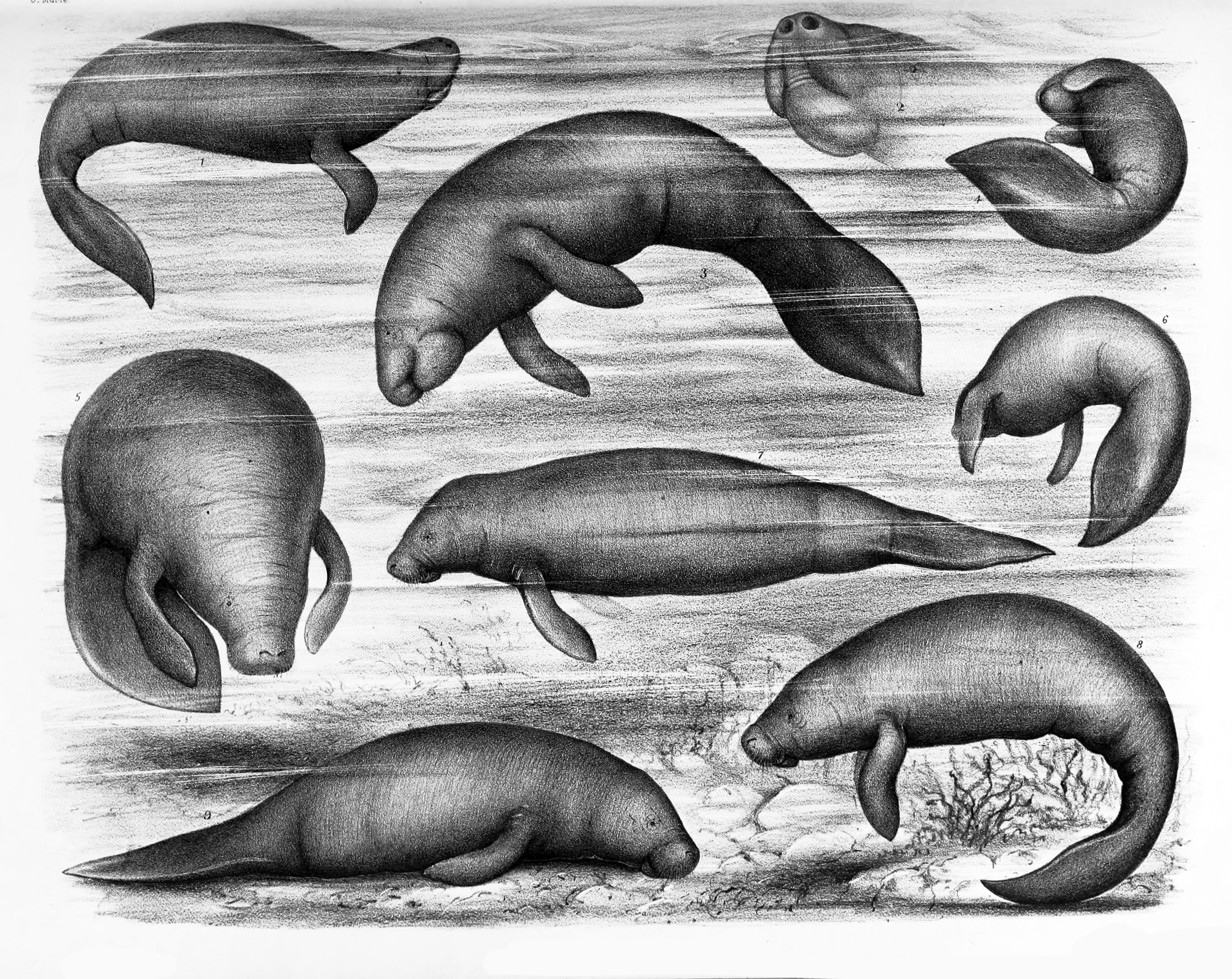
Manatee postures in captivity

Manatees are capable of understanding discrimination tasks and show signs of complex associative learning. They also have good long-term memory. They demonstrate discrimination and task-learning abilities similar to dolphins and pinnipeds in acoustic and visual studies. Social interactions between manatees are highly complex and intricate, which may indicate higher intelligence than previously thought, although they remain poorly understood by science.

=== Reproduction ===
Manatees are semi-social. There is no bond between males and females, and males play no role in care of the young. Their reproductive behavior can be described as "scramble promiscuity" wherein several males compete for mating rights with a single estrous female. While males typically mature around age three to five, they may be unable to secure mating rights until they are physically larger. The typical calving interval is two-and-a-half to three years. Manatees typically breed once every two years. Gestation lasts about 12 months and to wean the calf takes a further 12 to 18 months, although females may have more than one estrous cycle per year. Females may be seasonally polyestrous.

=== Calves ===
Usually, only a single calf is born. While possible, it is rare for twins to occur. At birth, their size ranges from around 3.3–4.9 ft (100–150 cm) long. Calves may be born at any time of the year but there may be seasonal peaks in parts of the range.

=== Communication ===
Manatees emit a wide range of sounds used in communication, especially between cows and their calves. Their ears are large internally but the external openings are small, and they are located four inches behind each eye. Adults communicate to maintain contact and during sexual and play behaviors. Taste and smell, in addition to sight, sound, and touch, may also be forms of communication.

=== Diet ===
Manatees are herbivores and eat over 60 different freshwater (e.g., floating hyacinth, pickerel weed, alligator weed, water lettuce, hydrilla, water celery, musk grass, mangrove leaves) and saltwater plants (e.g., sea grasses, shoal grass, manatee grass, turtle grass, widgeon grass, sea clover, and marine algae). Using their divided upper lip, an adult manatee will commonly eat up to 10–15% of their body weight (about 50 kg or 110 lb) per day. Consuming such an amount requires the manatee to graze for up to seven hours a day. To be able to cope with the high levels of cellulose in their plant based diet, manatees utilize hindgut fermentation to help with the digestion process. Manatees have been known to eat small numbers of fish from nets.

=== Feeding behavior ===
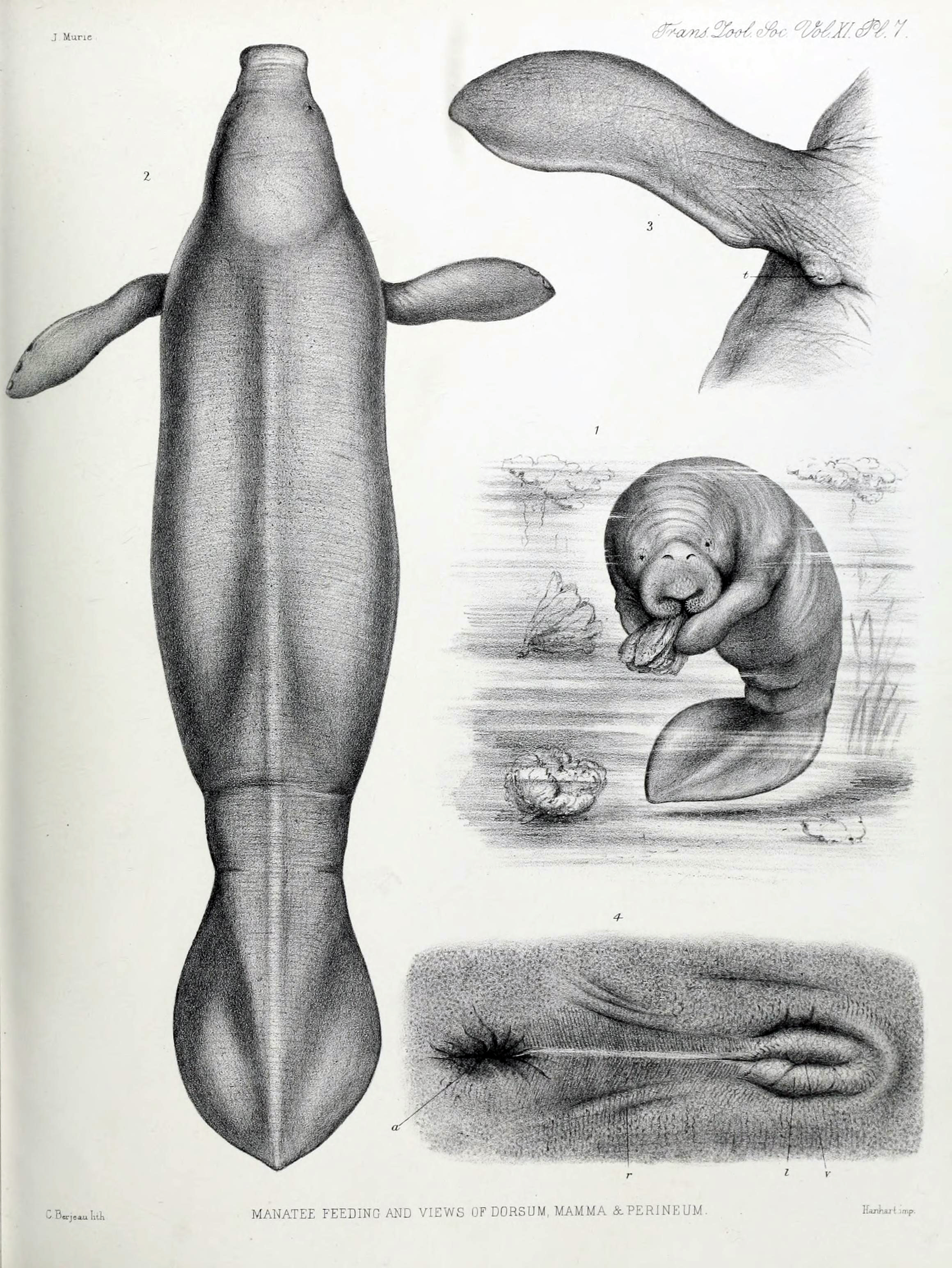
Manatee plate

Manatees use their flippers to "walk" along the bottom whilst they dig for plants and roots in the substrate. When plants are detected, the flippers are used to scoop the vegetation toward the manatee's lips. The manatee has prehensile lips; the upper lip pad is split into left and right sides which can move independently. The lips use seven muscles to manipulate and tear at plants. Manatees use their lips and front flippers to move the plants into the mouth. The manatee does not have front teeth, however, behind the lips, on the roof of the mouth, there are dense, ridged pads. These horny ridges, and the manatee's lower jaw, tear through ingested plant material.

=== Dentition ===
Manatees have four rows of teeth. There are 6 to 8 high-crowned, open-rooted molars located along each side of the upper and lower jaw giving a total of 24 to 32 flat, rough-textured teeth. Eating gritty vegetation abrades the teeth, particularly the enamel crown; however, research indicates that the enamel structure in manatee molars is weak. To compensate for this, manatee teeth are continually replaced. When anterior molars wear down, they are shed. Posterior molars erupt at the back of the row and slowly move forward to replace these like enamel crowns on a conveyor belt, similarly to elephants. This process continues throughout the manatee's lifetime. The rate at which the teeth migrate forward depends on how quickly the anterior teeth abrade. Some studies indicate that the rate is about 1 cm/month although other studies indicate 0.1 cm/month.

== Ecology ==
=== Range and habitat ===
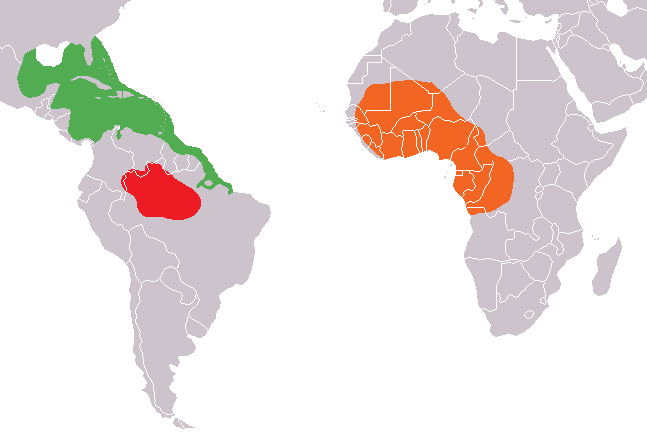
Approximate distribution of Trichechus; T. manatus T. inunguis T. senegalensis

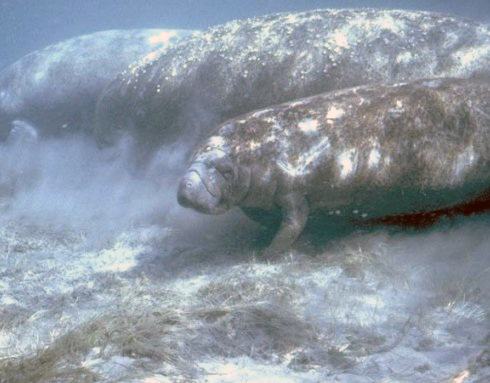
Three manatees

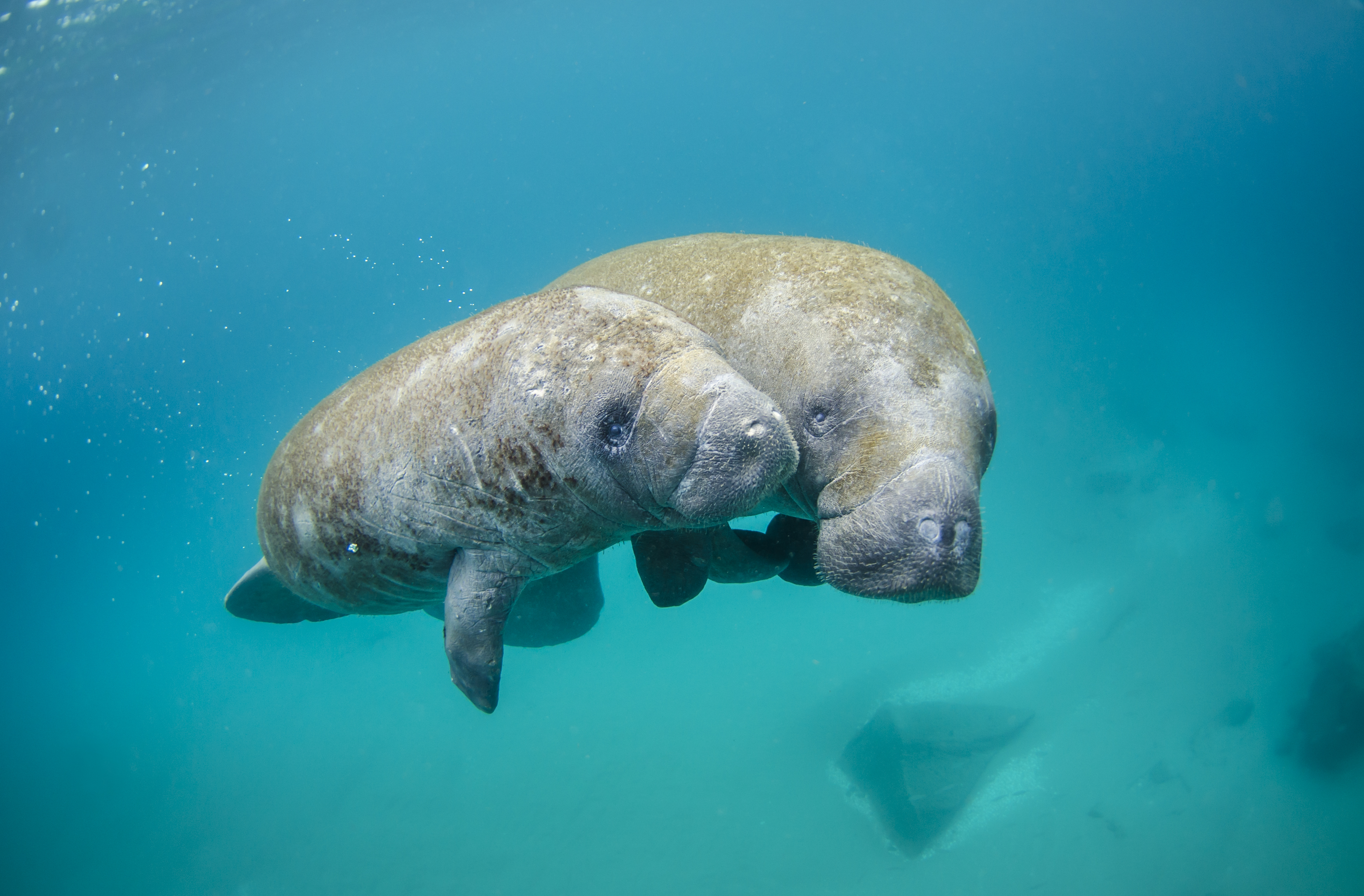
Mother manatee and calf

Manatees inhabit the shallow, marshy coastal areas and rivers of the Caribbean Sea and the Gulf of Mexico (T. manatus, West Indian manatee), the Amazon basin (T. inunguis, Amazonian manatee), and West Africa (T. senegalensis, West African manatee).

West Indian manatees prefer warmer temperatures and are known to congregate in shallow waters. They frequently migrate through brackish water estuaries to freshwater springs. They cannot survive below 15 °C (60 °F). Their natural source for warmth during winter is warm, spring-fed rivers.

==== West Indian ====
The coast of the state of Georgia is usually the northernmost range of the West Indian manatees because their low metabolic rate does not protect them in cold water. Prolonged exposure to water below 20 °C (68 °F) can cause "cold stress syndrome" and death.

West Indian manatees can move freely between fresh water and salt water. However, studies suggest that they are susceptible to dehydration if freshwater is not available for an extended period of time.

Manatees can travel hundreds of miles annually, and have been seen as far north as Cape Cod, and in 1995 and again in 2006, one was seen in New York City and Rhode Island's Narragansett Bay. A manatee was spotted in the Wolf River harbor near the Mississippi River in downtown Memphis in 2006, and was later found dead 16 km (10 mi) downriver in McKellar Lake. Another manatee was found dead on a New Jersey beach in February 2020, considered especially unusual given the time of year. At the time of the manatee's discovery, the water temperature in the area was below 6.5 °C (43.7 °F).

The West Indian manatee migrates into Florida rivers—such as the Crystal, the Homosassa, and the Chassahowitzka rivers, whose headsprings are 22 °C (72 °F) all year. Between November and March each year, about 600 West Indian manatees gather in the rivers in Citrus County, Florida such as the Crystal River National Wildlife Refuge.

In winter, manatees often gather near the warm-water outflows of power plants along the Florida coast, instead of migrating south as they once did. Some conservationists are concerned that these manatees have become too reliant on these artificially warmed areas.

Accurate population estimates of the West Indian manatee in Florida are difficult. They have been called scientifically weak because they vary widely from year to year, with most areas showing decreases, and little strong evidence of increases except in two areas. Manatee counts are highly variable without an accurate way to estimate numbers. In Florida in 1996, a winter survey found 2,639 manatees; in 1997, a January survey found 2,229, and a February survey found 1,706. A statewide synoptic survey in January 2010 found 5,067 manatees living in Florida, the highest number recorded to that time.

As of January 2016, the USFWS estimates the range-wide West Indian manatee population to be at least 13,000; as of January 2018, at least 6,100 are estimated to be in Florida.

Population viability studies conducted in 1997 found that decreasing adult survival and eventual extinction were probable future outcomes for Florida manatees unless they received more protection. The U.S. Fish and Wildlife Service proposed downgrading the manatee's status from endangered to threatened in January 2016 after more than 40 years.

There is a small population of the subspecies Antillean manatee (T. m. manatus) found in Mexico's Caribbean coastal area. The best estimate for this population is 200–250. As of 2022, a new manatee habitat was discovered by Klaus Thymann within the cenotes of Sian Ka'an Biosphere Reserve on the Yucatán Peninsula. The explorer and his team documented the discovery with a 12-minute film that is available on the interactive streaming platform WaterBear. The discovery got picked up by the New Scientist in 2024, who featured in a 10-minute short film.

==== Amazonian ====
The freshwater Amazonian manatee (T. inunguis) inhabits the Central Amazon Basin in Brazil, eastern Perú, southeastern Colombia, but not Ecuador. It is the only exclusively freshwater manatee, and is also the smallest. Since they are unable to reduce peripheral heat loss, it is found primarily in tropical waters.

==== West African ====
They are found in coastal marine and estuarine habitats, and in freshwater river systems along the west coast of Africa from the Senegal River south to the Cuanza River in Angola. They live as far upriver on the Niger River as Koulikoro in Mali, 2,000 km (1,200 mi) from the coast.

=== Predation ===
In relation to the threat posed by humans, predation does not present a significant threat to manatees. When threatened, the manatee's response is to dive as deeply as it can, suggesting that threats have most frequently come from land dwellers such as humans rather than from other water-dwelling creatures such as caimans or sharks.

== Relation to humans ==
=== Threats ===
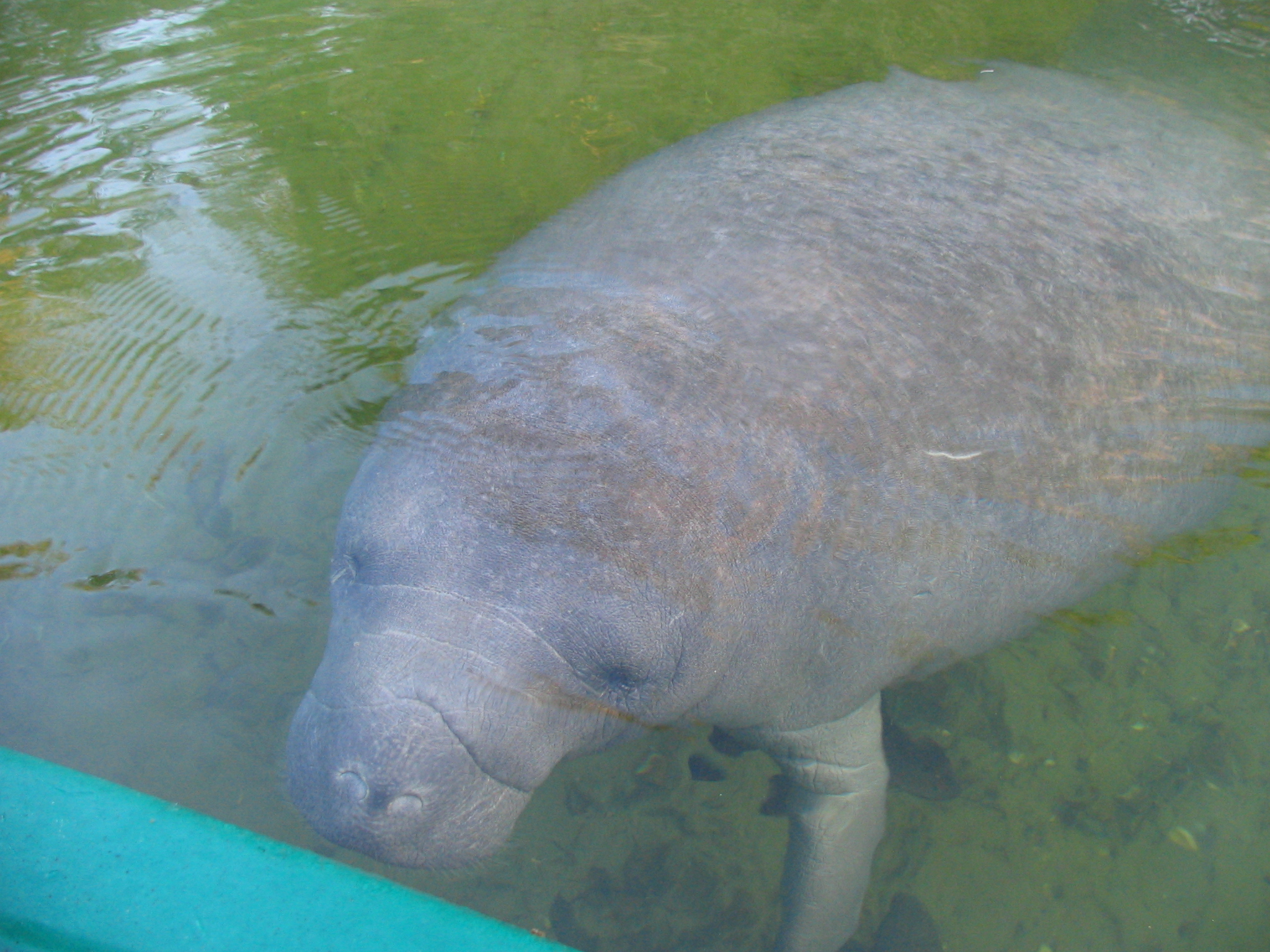
Young manatees can be curious; this individual is inspecting a kayak.

The main causes of death for manatees are human-related issues, such as habitat destruction and human objects. Natural causes of death include adverse temperatures, predation by crocodiles on young, and disease.

==== Ship strikes ====
Their slow-moving, curious nature, coupled with dense coastal development, has led to many violent collisions with propeller-driven boats and ships, leading frequently to maiming, disfigurement, and even death. As a result, a large proportion of manatees exhibit spiral cutting propeller scars on their backs, usually caused by larger vessels that do not have skegs in front of the propellers like the smaller outboard and inboard-outboard recreational boats have. They are now even identified by humans based on their scar patterns. Many manatees have been cut in two by large vessels like ships and tug boats, even in the highly populated lower St. Johns River's narrow channels. Some are concerned that the current situation is inhumane, with upwards of 50 scars and disfigurements from vessel strikes on a single manatee. Often, the lacerations lead to infections, which can prove fatal. Internal injuries stemming from being trapped between hulls and docks and impacts have also been fatal. Testing and studies from the 2000s and 2010s suggested that manatees may be able to hear speed boats and other watercraft approaching, due to the frequency the boat makes. However, a manatee may not be able to hear the approaching boats when they are performing day-to-day activities or distractions. The manatee has a tested frequency range of 8 to 32 kilohertz.

Manatees hear on a higher frequency than would be expected for such large marine mammals. Many large boats emit very low frequencies, which confuse the manatee and explain their lack of awareness around boats. The Lloyd's mirror effect results in low frequency propeller sounds not being discernible near the surface, where most accidents occur. Research indicates that when a boat has a higher frequency the manatees rapidly swim away from danger.

In 2003, a population model was released by the United States Geological Survey that predicted an extremely grave situation confronting the manatee in both the Southwest and Atlantic regions where the vast majority of manatees are found. It states,

In the absence of any new management action, that is, if boat mortality rates continue to increase at the rates observed since 1992, the situation in the Atlantic and Southwest regions is dire, with no chance of meeting recovery criteria within 100 years. "Hurricanes, cold stress, red tide poisoning and a variety of other maladies threaten manatees, but by far their greatest danger is from watercraft strikes, which account for about a quarter of Florida manatee deaths," said study curator John Jett.

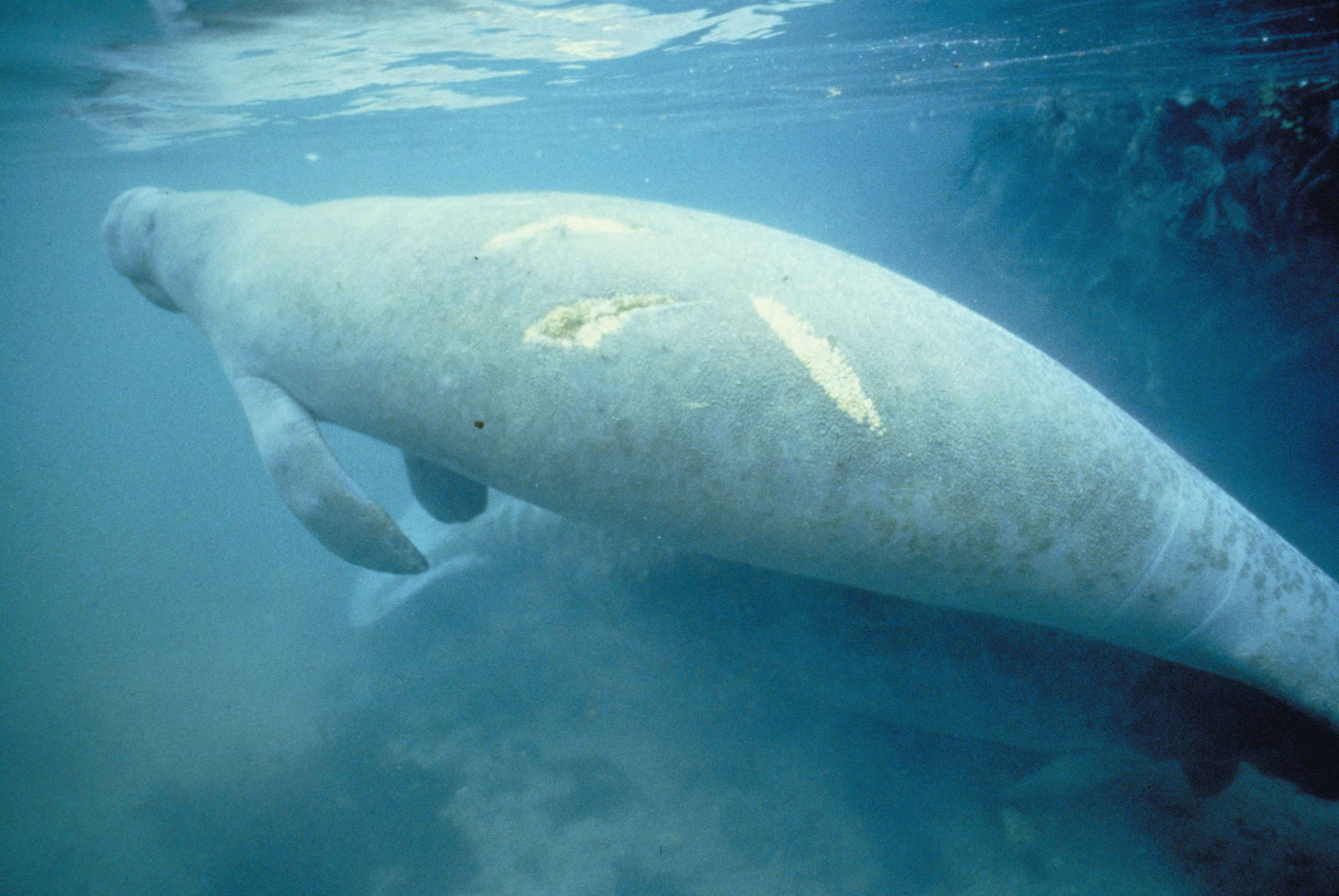
Manatee bearing scars on its back from a boat propeller

According to marine mammal veterinarians:

The severity of mutilations for some of these individuals can be astounding – including long term survivors with completely severed tails, major tail mutilations, and multiple disfiguring dorsal lacerations. These injuries not only cause gruesome wounds, but may also impact population processes by reducing calf production (and survival) in wounded females – observations also speak to the likely pain and suffering endured. In an example, they cited one case study of a small calf "with a severe dorsal mutilation trailing a decomposing piece of dermis and muscle as it continued to accompany and nurse from its mother ... by age 2 its dorsum was grossly deformed and included a large protruding rib fragment visible."

These veterinarians go on to state:

[T]he overwhelming documentation of gruesome wounding of manatees leaves no room for denial. Minimization of this injury is explicit in the Recovery Plan, several state statutes, and federal laws, and implicit in our society's ethical and moral standards.

One-quarter of annual manatee deaths in Florida are caused by boat collisions with manatees. In 2009, of the 429 Florida manatees recorded dead, 97 were killed by commercial and recreational vessels, which broke the earlier record number of 95 set in 2002.

==== Red tide ====
Another cause of manatee deaths are red tides, a term used for the proliferation, or "blooms", of the microscopic marine algae Karenia brevis. This dinoflagellate produces brevetoxins that can have toxic effects on the central nervous system of animals.

In 1996, a red tide was responsible for 151 manatee deaths in Florida. The bloom was present from early March to the end of April and killed approximately 15% of the known population of manatees along South Florida's western coast. Other blooms in 1982 and 2005 resulted in 37 and 44 deaths respectively, and a red tide killed 123 manatees between November 2022 and June 2023.

==== Starvation ====
In 2021 a massive die-off of seagrass along the Atlantic coast of Florida left manatees without enough food to eat, and they began dying at high rates. The U.S. Fish and Wildlife Service responded with a feeding program that distributed 3,000 pounds (1,361 kg) of lettuce per day to the manatee population.

==== Additional threats ====
Manatees can also be crushed and isolated in water control structures (navigation locks, floodgates, etc.) and are occasionally killed by entanglement in fishing gear, such as crab pot float lines, box traps, and shark nets.

While humans are allowed to swim with manatees in one area of Florida, there have been numerous charges of people harassing and disturbing the manatees. According to the United States Fish and Wildlife Service, approximately 99 manatee deaths each year are related to human activities. In January 2016, there were 43 manatee deaths in Florida alone. Also in Florida, significant numbers are killed annually from entanglement in fishing gear, ingestion of plastic, and recreational fishing gear, or accidental drowning in canal locks. Actual and potential habitat (seagrass) destruction is a significant conservation factor. Runoff of anthropogenic chemicals (pesticides, etc.) could potentially become a range-wide problem. Natural and artificial warm water refugia are key habitat components to manatees in Florida.

The Amazonian manatee (Trichechus inunguis) is a vulnerable species native to the Amazon River Basin and is threatened by habitat loss, illegal hunting, and pollution.

=== Conservation ===
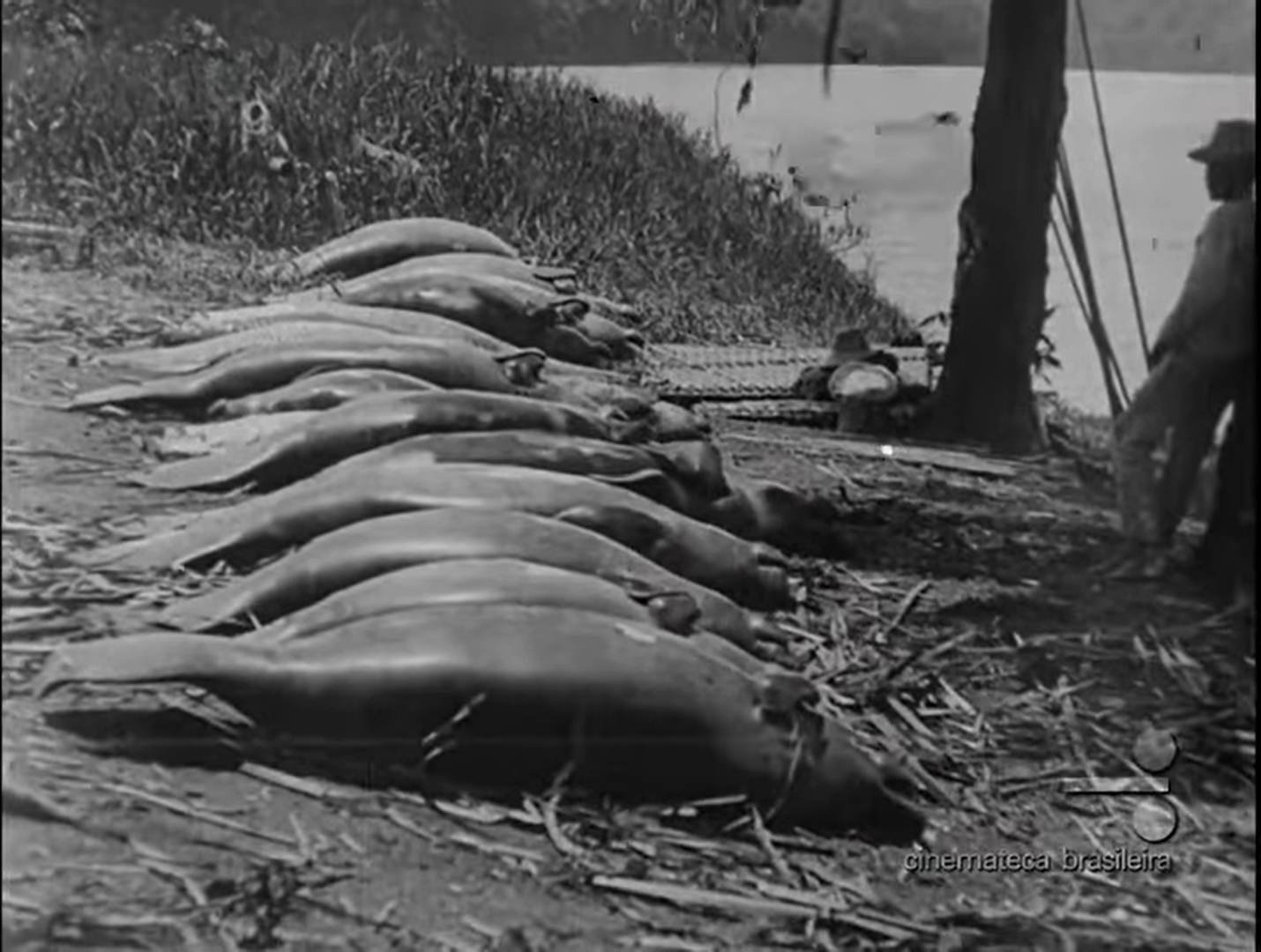
Dead manatees hunted from the Amazon River in Brazil, c. 1920. Brazil outlawed manatee hunting in 1973.

All three species of manatee are listed by the World Conservation Union as vulnerable to extinction. However, The U.S. Fish and Wildlife Service (FWS) does not consider the West Indian manatee to be "endangered" anymore, having downgraded its status to "threatened" as of March 2017. They cite improvements to habitat conditions, population growth and reductions of threats as reasoning for the change. The reclassification was met with controversy, with Florida congressman Vern Buchanan and groups such as the Save the Manatee Club and the Center for Biological Diversity expressing concerns that the change would have a detrimental effect on conservation efforts. The new classification will not affect current federal protections. West Indian manatees were originally classified as endangered with the 1967 class of endangered species.

Manatee deaths in the state of Florida nearly doubled in 2021 from 637 (2020) to 1100. Although this number decreased to 800 in 2022, it is likely that current rate of development in Florida, climate change, and decreasing water quality, habitat range, and genetic diversity among this population may lead to reconsideration of the West Indian Manatee as an endangered species. Manatee population in the United States reached a low in the 1970s, during which only a few hundred individuals lived in the nation. As of February 2016, 6,250 manatees were reported swimming in Florida's springs. It is illegal under federal and Florida law to injure or harm a manatee. Manatees are protected by the Marine Mammal Protection Act of 1972, the Endangered Species Act of 1973, and the Florida Manatee Sanctuary Act of 1978. Under Florida law, it is illegal to feed, harass, harm, pursue, hunt, shoot, wound, kill, annoy, or molest manatees.

Also in Florida, due to extensive destruction of their habitat, manatees rely on the warm waters created by a major power plant's hot water effluent streams to survive during the cold winter months. Manatee reliance on these effluent streams is such that the streams are protected under federal environmental legislation. Researchers have theorized that the prevalence of manatee sightings near this power plant is contributing to "collective inattention" to industrialization and development as ongoing causes of manatee habitat destruction.

There are many conservation programs that have been created to help manatees. Save the Manatee Club is a non-profit group and membership organization that works to protect manatees and their aquatic ecosystems. Founded by Bob Graham, former Florida governor, and singer/songwriter Jimmy Buffett, this is today's leading manatee conservation club.

The MV Freedom Star and MV Liberty Star, ships used by NASA to tow Space Shuttle Solid Rocket Boosters back to Kennedy Space Center, were propelled only by water jets to protect the endangered manatee population that inhabits regions of the Banana River where the ships are based.

Brazil outlawed hunting in 1973 in an effort to preserve the species. Deaths by boat strikes are still common. Although countries are protecting Amazonian manatees in the locations where they are endangered, as of 1994 there were no enforced laws, and the manatees were still being captured throughout their range.

=== Captivity ===
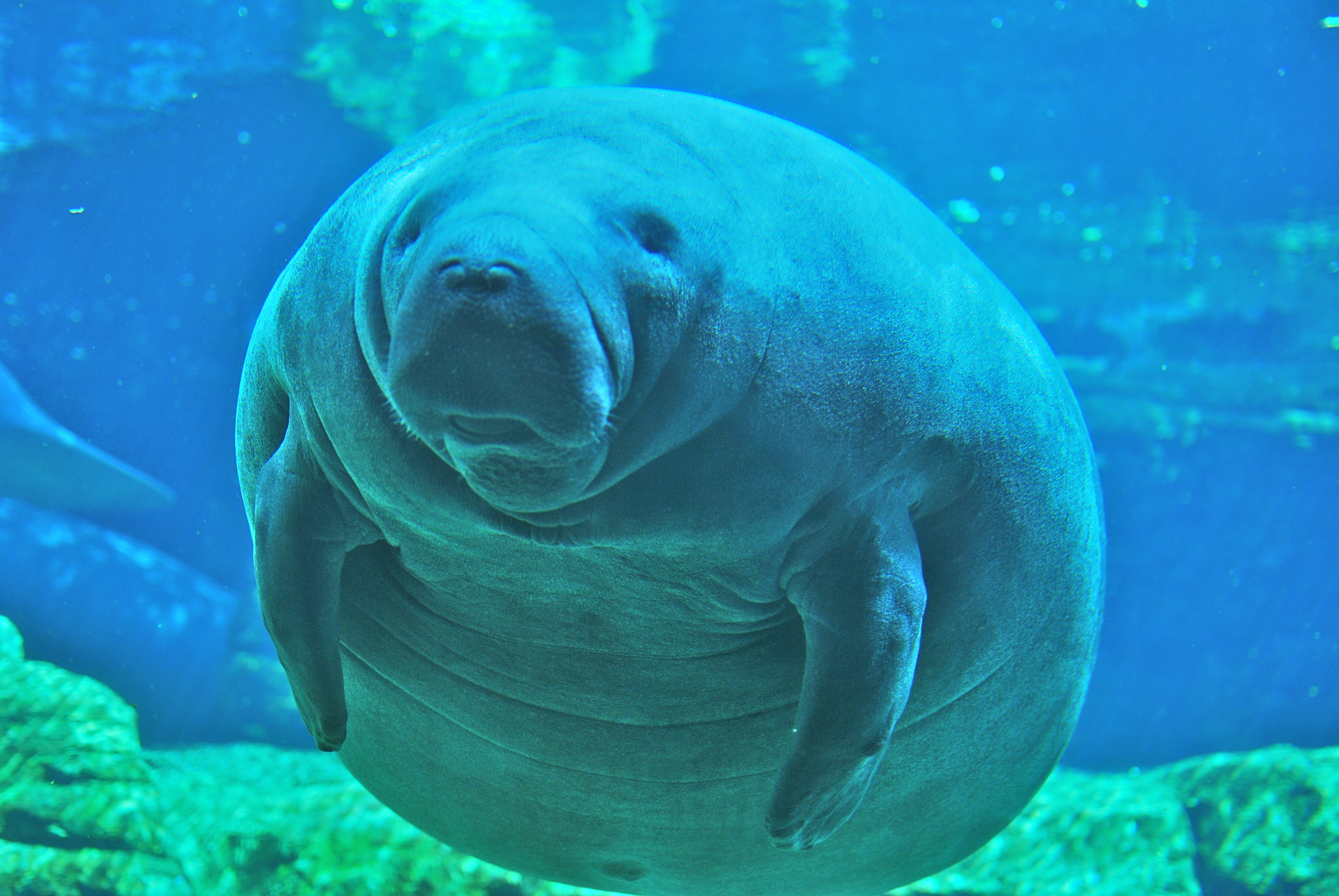
A manatee at SeaWorld, Florida

There are a number of manatee rehabilitation centers in the United States. These include three government-run critical care facilities in Florida at Lowry Park Zoo, Miami Seaquarium, and SeaWorld Orlando. After initial treatment at these facilities, the manatees are transferred to rehabilitation facilities before release. These include the Cincinnati Zoo and Botanical Garden, Columbus Zoo and Aquarium, Epcot's The Seas, South Florida Museum, and Homosassa Springs Wildlife State Park.

The Columbus Zoo was a founding member of the Manatee Rehabilitation Partnership in 2001. Since 1999, the zoo's Manatee Bay facility has helped rehabilitate 20 manatees. The Cincinnati Zoo has rehabilitated and released more than a dozen manatees since 1999.

Manatees can also be viewed in a number of European zoos, such as the Tierpark Berlin and the Nuremberg Zoo in Germany, in ZooParc de Beauval in France, the Aquarium of Genoa in Italy and the Royal Burgers' Zoo in Arnhem, the Netherlands, where manatees have parented offspring. The River Safari at Singapore features seven of them.

The oldest manatee in captivity was Snooty, at the South Florida Museum's Parker Manatee Aquarium in Bradenton, Florida. Born at the Miami Aquarium and Tackle Company on July 21, 1948, Snooty was one of the first recorded captive manatee births. Raised entirely in captivity, Snooty was never to be released into the wild. As such he was the only manatee at the aquarium, and one of only a few captive manatees in the United States that was allowed to interact with human handlers. That made him uniquely suitable for manatee research and education.

Snooty died suddenly two days after his 69th birthday, July 23, 2017, when he was found in an underwater area only used to access plumbing for the exhibit life support system. The South Florida Museum's initial press release stated, "Early indications are that an access panel door that is normally bolted shut had somehow been knocked loose and that Snooty was able to swim in."

==== Guyana ====
Since the 19th century, Georgetown, Guyana has kept West Indian manatees in its botanical garden, and later, its national park. In the 1910s and again in the 1950s, sugar estates in Guyana used manatees to keep their irrigation canals weed-free. Between the 1950s and 1970s, the Georgetown water treatment plant used manatees in their storage canals for the same purpose.

=== Culture ===
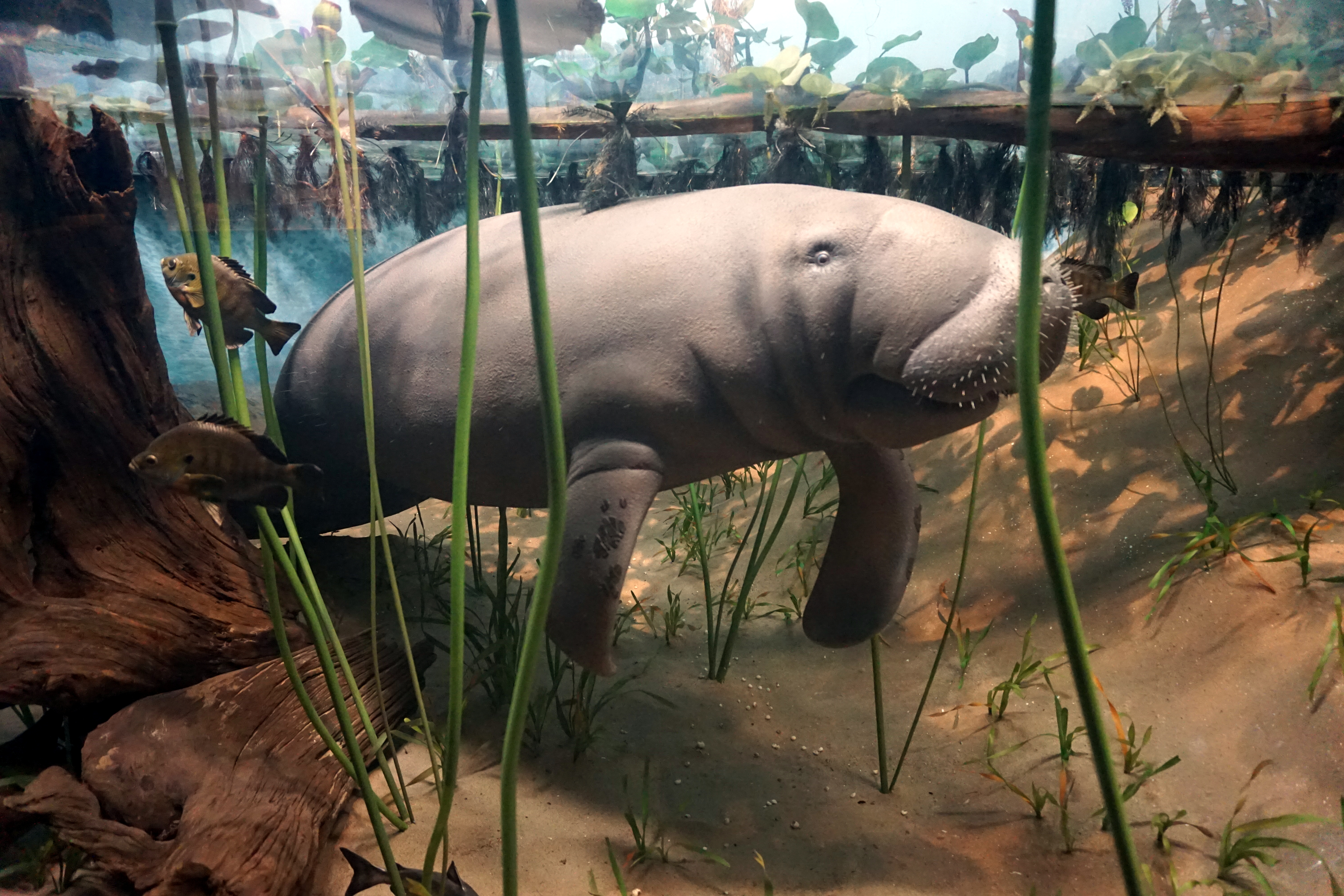
The Manatee at Blue Springs, Florida diorama at the Milwaukee Public Museum

The manatee has been linked to folklore on mermaids. In West African folklore, they were considered sacred and thought to have been once human. Killing one was taboo and required penance. In the cosmogony of the Serer people of Senegal, Gambia, and Mauritania, the cayman and the manatee holds great significance in Serer mythology. The cayman is believed to hold the secrets of the past whilst the manatee holds the secrets of the future.

In the novel Moby-Dick, Herman Melville distinguishes manatees ("Lamatins", cf. lamantins) from small whales; stating, "I am aware that down to the present time, the fish styled Lamatins and Dugongs (Pig-fish and Sow-fish of the Coffins of Nantucket) are included by many naturalists among the whales. But as these pig-fish are a noisy, contemptible set, mostly lurking in the mouths of rivers, and feeding on wet hay, and especially as they do not spout, I deny their credentials as whales; and have presented them with their passports to quit the Kingdom of Cetology."

A manatee called Wardell appears in the Animal Crossing: New Horizons video game. He is part of a paid downloadable content expansion, managing and selling furniture to the player.

In Rudyard Kipling's The White Seal (one of the stories in The Jungle Book), Sea Cow, about whom the story says that he has only six cervical vertebrae, is a manatee.

The manatees Friends West Indian Manatee, Dugong, and Steller's Sea Cow appear in multiple Kemono Friends games, including the app version of Kemono Friends 3.

In the Neapolitan region of Italy, a culinary legend exists around the consumption of manatees during World War II. In the story, when Naples and Salerno surrendered to the Allies in 1943, the cities, lacking food supplies thanked the Allied generals by serving manatee from the aquarium. When this was revealed, the popular reaction was not shock, but questions over how it was prepared, to which the answer was "aglio-olio [garlic and olive oil], of course, with a little parsley."

== See also ==
- Dwarf manatee
- Manatee of Helena
