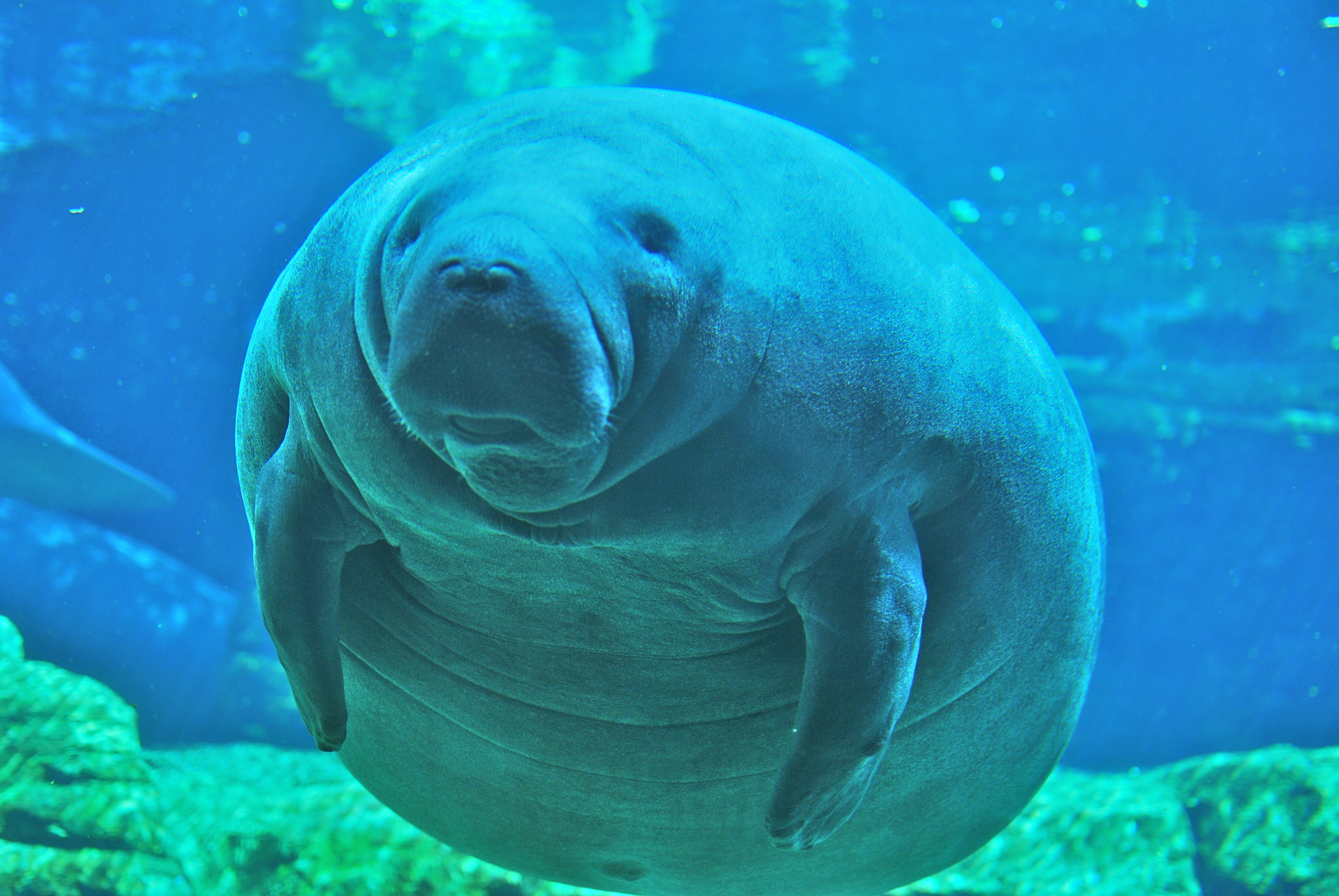
- West Indian manatee (Trichechus manatus)

Scientific classification
- Kingdom: Animalia
- Phylum: Chordata
- Class: Mammalia
- Order: Sirenia
- Family: Trichechidae; Gill 1872

Genera
- See Text

= Trichechidae =

Trichechidae Temporal range: Late Oligocene – Recent

Family of aquatic mammals

Trichechidae is a family of sirenians that includes all living manatees and several extinct genera.

== Systematics ==
Trichechidae

- †Miosireninae
  - †Anomotherium
    - †Anomotherium langewieschei
  - †Miosiren
    - †Miosiren canhami
    - †Miosiren kocki
- Trichechinae
  - Trichechus
    - Trichechus inunguis - Amazonian Manatee
    - Trichechus manatus - West Indian Manatee
    - Trichechus senegalensis - African Manatee
    - †Trichechus hesperamazonicus
  - †Potamosiren
    - †Potamosiren magdalensis
  - †Ribodon
    - †Ribodon limbatus
