= Potamosiren =

Potamosiren Temporal range: Mid Miocene (Laventan) ~13.8–11.8 Ma

Scientific classification
- Kingdom: Animalia
- Phylum: Chordata
- Class: Mammalia
- Order: Sirenia
- Family: Trichechidae
- Subfamily: Trichechinae
- Genus: †Potamosiren; Reinhart 1951

Species
- Potamosiren magdalenensis Reinhart, 1951 (type)

Extinct genus of mammals

Potamosiren is an extinct genus of manatee from the Middle Miocene (Laventan) Honda Group of Colombia.

== Phylogeny ==
A 2014 cladistic analysis of extinct sirenians recovers Potamosiren as a close relative of modern manatees.

== See also ==
- Evolution of sirenians
