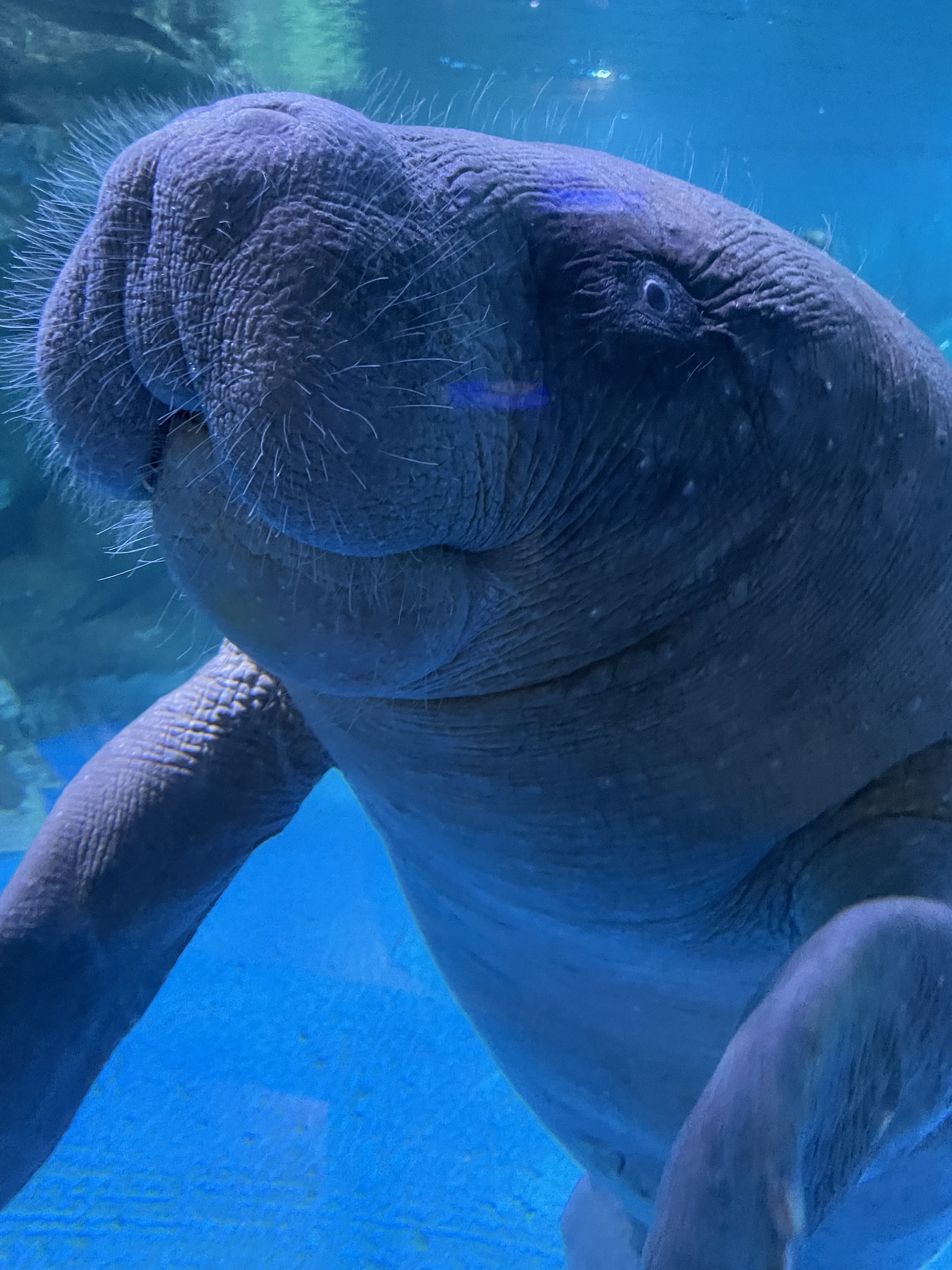
- African manatee at COEX Aquarium

Conservation status
- Vulnerable (IUCN 3.1)
- CITES Appendix I

Scientific classification
- Kingdom: Animalia
- Phylum: Chordata
- Class: Mammalia
- Infraclass: Placentalia
- Order: Sirenia
- Family: Trichechidae
- Genus: Trichechus
- Species: T. senegalensis

Binomial name
- Trichechus senegalensis Link, 1795
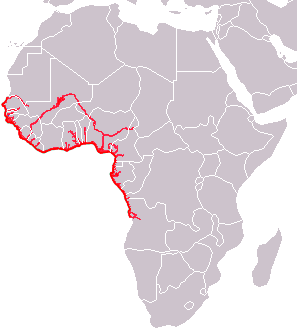
- African manatee range

= African manatee =

Species of mammal

The African manatee (Trichechus senegalensis), also known as the West African manatee, is a species of manatee that inhabits much of Western Africa – from Senegal to Angola. It is the only manatee species to be found in the Old World, as well as one of the two living sirenians that live in the Old World, the other being the dugong.

== Taxonomy ==
The African manatee was officially declared a species under the Trichechus senegalensis taxon in 1795 by naturalist Johann Heinrich Friedrich Link. No subspecies of this taxon are known. Although African manatees live in both coastal areas and isolated inland areas, genetic evidence suggests no significant differences between the two populations. The African manatee falls under the genus Trichechus with only two other species, the Amazonian manatee and the West Indian manatee, which are also sirenians.

== Range and habitat ==
African manatees inhabit the widest ranges of habitats of any sirenian species, ranging from offshore islands in the Atlantic to rivers in the western Sahel, equatorial rainforest rivers, and so on. It has been reported that coastal populations ascend rivers during the rainy season and descend again during the dry season. The movement and habitat of the African manatee has been threatened by the building of agricultural and hydroelectric dams along rivers that isolate populations, such as the Akosombo Dam in Ghana. The Diama Dam has permanently isolated the Senegal River manatee population from the coast, as has the Felou Dam in Mali.

African Manatees can be found in West African regions: Angola, Benin, Cameroon, Chad, the Republic of the Congo, the Democratic Republic of the Congo, Côte d'Ivoire, Equatorial Guinea, Gabon, The Gambia, Ghana, Guinea, Guinea-Bissau, Liberia, Mali, Mauritania, Niger, Nigeria, Senegal, Sierra Leone, and Togo. Manatees are found in brackish waters to freshwater: in oceans, rivers, lakes, coastal estuaries, reservoirs, lagoons, and bays on the coast. African manatees rarely inhabit waters with a temperature below 18°C (64°F).

Manatees have been found as far as 75 kilometres (47 mi) offshore, where there are shallow coastal flats and calm mangrove creeks filled with seagrass. Inland lakes where manatees dwell include Lake Volta, the Inner Niger River Delta in Mali, Lake Léré, and Lake de Tréné. Due to fluctuating flow rates and water levels in rivers, some of these permanent lakes serve as refuges for manatees in connecting rivers during the dry season. From north to south, the river systems that contain manatees include: the Senegal, Saloum, Gambia, Casamance, Cacheu, Mansôa, Geba, Buba, Tombali, Cacine, Kogon, Konkouré, Sierra Leone, Great Scarcies, Little Scarcies, Sherbro, Malem, Waanje, Sewa, Missunado, Cavalla, St. Paul, Morro, St. John, Bandama, Niouniourou, Sassandra, Comoé, Bia, Tano, Volta, Mono, Oueme, Niger, Mekrou, Benue, Cross, Katsena Ala, Bani, Akwayafe, Rio del Rey, Ngosso, Andokat, Mene, Munaya, Wouri, Sanaga, Faro, Chari, Bamaingui, Bahr-Kieta, Logoné, Mitémélé, Gabon, Ogooué, Lovanzi, Kouilou, Congo, Dande, Bengo, and Cuanza. Manatees move up these rivers until they are unable to proceed because of shallow waters or strong waterfalls.

The areas with the highest manatee populations are Guinea-Bissau, the lagoons of Côte d'Ivoire, the southern portions of the Niger River in Nigeria, the Sanaga River in Cameroon, the coastal lagoons in Gabon, and the lower parts of the Congo River. As part of a study completed in Côte d'Ivoire to assess where the majority of African manatees favor living, a sample of African manatees was radio-tagged and tracked. The tracking observed most of the sample in coastal lagoons, mangroves, and other herbaceous growths. They were also found in the grassy estuaries of big rivers with mangroves and in protected coastal spots with less than 3 metres (10 ft) of water containing both mangroves and marine macrophytes.

== Diet ==
Manatees are omnivores; and are known to occasionally eat clams, mollusks, and fish found in nets. The percentage of the diet that is composed of non-plant material varies based on location, with manatees living off the coast having a lifetime average of 50% non-plant material. The West African manatee is the only sirenian that seems to intentionally consume non-plant material. A majority of the African manatee's diet is made up of a variety of flora found above or hanging over the water. African manatees that inhabit rivers mostly eat the overhanging plants growing on the river banks. The diet of African manatees living in estuaries consists solely of mangrove trees. Each day, the African manatee eats about four to nine percent of its body weight in wet vegetation. Microorganisms within the African manatee's large intestine, which measures up to 20 metres or 66 feet in length, aid it in digesting the large quantity and variety of vegetation that it consumes daily.

== Description ==
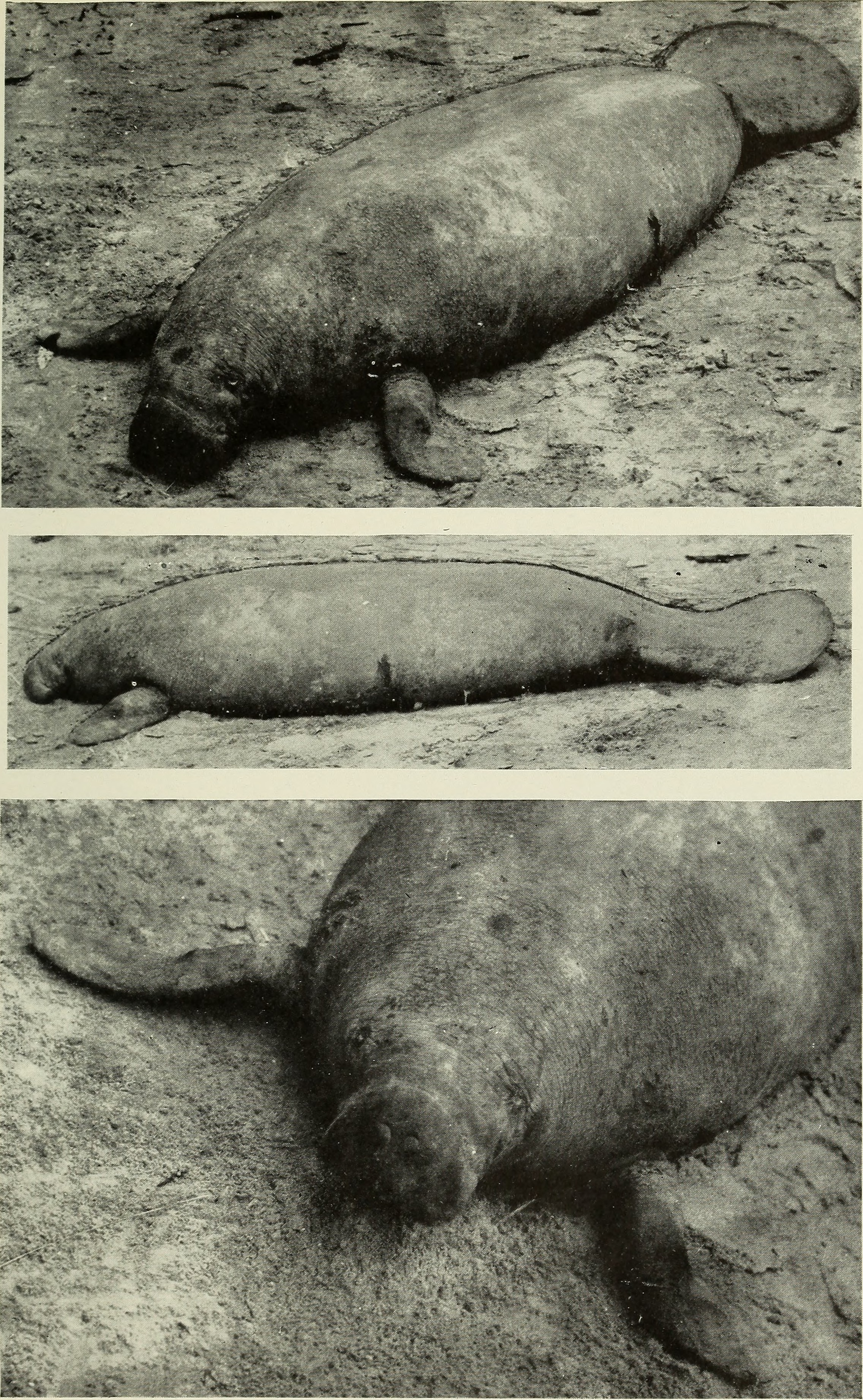
African manatee on land

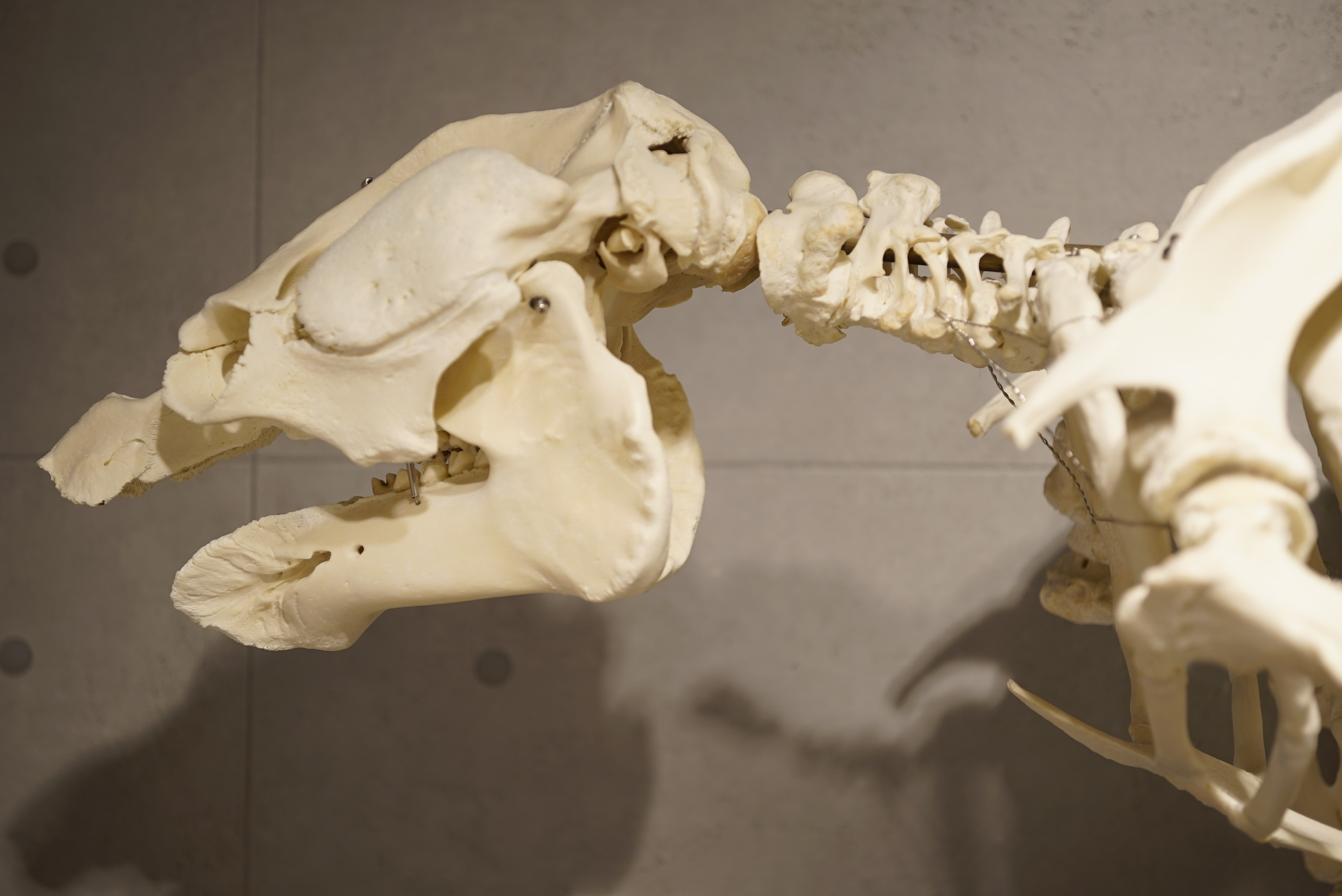
Skull of an African manatee

The African manatee's body is widest at the middle, and its tail resembles a paddle. The manatee is gray in color with small, colorless hairs that cover its body. However, algae and other tiny organisms often grow on an African manatee's body, so its body sometimes appears brown or greenish in color. Calves are darker in color when they are very young. African manatees measure up to 4.5 m (15 ft) in length, and weigh about 360 kilograms (790 pounds). African manatees are typically extremely slow, moving between 4.8 km and 8.0 km (3 and 5 mi) per hour, although when scared by predators they can travel at speeds of about 32 km (20 mi) per hour. The African manatee's large forelimbs, or flippers, are used to paddle and to bring food to its mouth. Vegetation is then chewed by the manatee's strong molars, which are its only teeth. When the manatee is born, each jaw has two vestigial incisors, which the manatee loses as it matures. If the African manatee's molars happen to fall out, new molars grow in their place. The manatee's flippers, which have nails, are also used to graze other manatees. The African manatee does not have any hind limbs. From the exterior, the African manatee looks very similar to the American manatee; however, the African manatee is different from the Amazonian manatee, which has characteristic white markings on its abdomen.

== Evolution and legends ==
The West African manatee is a descendant of trichechids found in coastal South America during the Pliocene Epoch. Although they tend to stay in freshwater, theory suggests that, through transoceanic currents, the species reached West Africa during the late Pliocene. The West African manatee's appearance is thought to be the result of these currents and species movement. The African manatee's ancestors passed down advantageous migration and food traits. The African manatee is not restricted to a certain area, and does not have to rely heavily on only one ecosystem for support. This evolution of the African manatee's diversity may be part of its key attribute to survival. They are more diverse than other manatees due to their ability to survive in salt water, although they do need access to fresh water for drinking purposes.

According to people of western Africa, Maame Water (also spelled Mami Wata), a recurring character in many coastal legends, is a goddess of the sea and a symbol of wealth and beauty. Maame Water also flips over canoes and entices their occupants to visit her kingdom. Scientists from the Institute of Aquatic Biology of the Centre for Scientific and Industrial Research (CSIR) and the Wildlife Department in Ghana have concluded that Maame Water is based on the West African manatee. According to Dr. Mamaa Entsua-Mensah, who performs research for CSIR, when female African manatees surface for air, they resemble goddesses. Entsua-Mensah explains that the female manatee's breasts create the illusion of a woman-fish.

Among the Serer people of Senegal, the Gambia and Mauritania, the manatee is regarded as sacred and highly respected, because in the Serer creation myth, it is viewed as the guardian of the secrets of the future.

== Behavior ==
The African manatee is nocturnal. They tend to travel silently, eat, and be active towards the end of the day and during the nighttime. During the daytime, the African manatee dozes in shallow (1 to 2 meter deep) water. In countries such as Sierra Leone, African manatees migrate upstream when flooding occurs in June and July. This flooding can lower the availability of food for the manatees as well as lower the salinity of waterways. African manatees live in groups of 1 to 6. They have very few natural predators, two of which are sharks and crocodiles. They are also very social, spending a majority of their day bonding by touch, verbal communication, and smell. This creates a deep bond between them. When it is time to migrate due to a weather change, manatees will travel in larger groups to find warmer water and food.

== Reproduction ==
The sex of an individual African manatee can only be determined by close examination of the manatee's underside. The only visible distinction between males and females is the genital openings. However, males tend to be smaller than females. Some female African manatees are sexually mature as young as 3 years of age, and they give birth every 3 to 5 years of their estimated 30-year lifespan. Males take a longer time to mature (about 9 to 10 years) and can rarely fertilize an egg at the age of 2 or 3 years. African manatees breed year-round. When males and females mate, it is not monogamous; multiple males will usually mate with one female. When the opportunity to mate with a female is at stake, males will fight with each other by pushing and shoving. Female African manatees give birth to one calf at a time after about a 13-month pregnancy. Calves can swim on their own at birth. Although the African manatee's social organization is not well understood, research shows the most common and tightly knit bonds are between a mother and her calf.

== Threats ==
The African manatee is a vulnerable species because of its meat, oil, bones, and skin, which can bring great wealth to poachers. Specifically they are used to make walking sticks and toy spinning tops. In some countries, such as Nigeria and Cameroon, African manatees are sold to zoos, aquariums, online as pets, and they are sometimes shipped internationally. Anyone visiting such countries will notice manatee meat being sold on the streets and in marketplaces, but the lack of law enforcement protects the poachers from punishment. Residents of countries such as Mali and Chad use the oil of the African manatee in belief that it can cure ailments such as ear infections, rheumatism, and skin conditions.

There are even more threats to the African manatees' habitat and life: urban and agricultural development, increased damming, and increased use of hydroelectric power in the rivers of countries like Côte d'Ivoire and Ghana. The building of dams has led to genetic isolation of some populations. There is little data to show if this has any negative long-term effects on the population as a whole. At several hydroelectric dams including the Kanji dam on the Niger River and the Akosombo dam on the Volta River manatees have been caught and killed in the turbines and intake valves. Thick congestion of boats in waterways may cause the manatees to have deadly run-ins with the vessels. However, even natural occurrences, such as droughts and tidal changes, can often strand manatees in unsuitable habitats. Some are killed accidentally by fishing trawls and in nets which are intended for catching sharks.

Some behaviors of African manatees provoke humans to hunt them. When manatees become tangled in fishing nets, they can damage them. People in countries such as Sierra Leone believe that killing the manatees to reduce the species size lowers the chances of the fishing nets requiring expensive repairs. In addition, African manatees can destroy rice crops by drifting into fields during the rainy season.

Many of the African manatees that venture up the Niger River starve to death. At certain times each year, the Niger River dries up due to the hot temperatures and lack of rain. Many manatees migrate there during the rainy season. When the water dries up the manatees are unable to get to other bodies of water.

Manatees do not have many true predators. Apart from humans, they are threatened by sharks and crocodiles but this is rare because of a difference in habitat. In West Africa, West African crocodiles make up the majority of manatee predators besides humans.

== Conservation ==
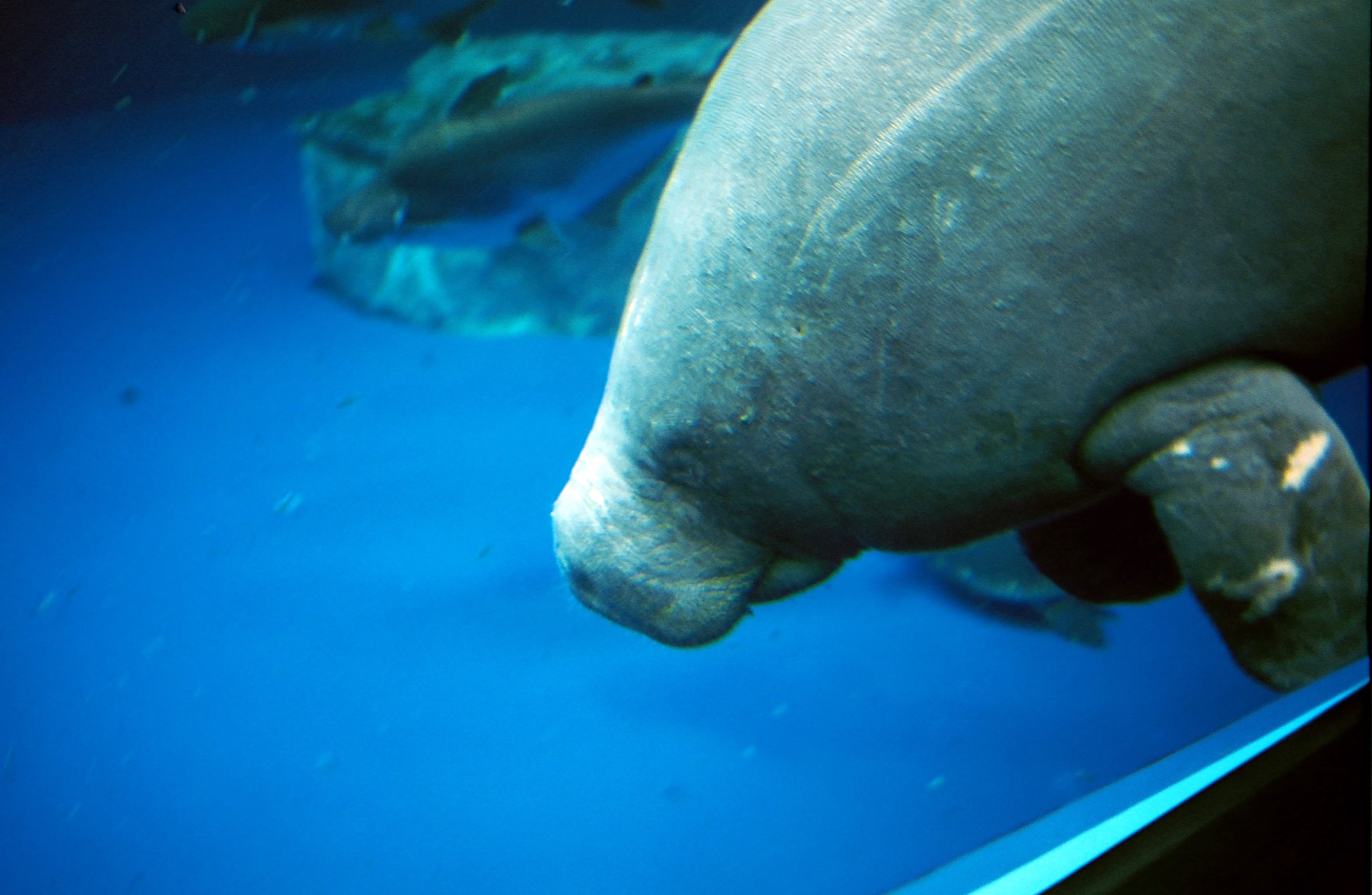
African Manatee in Toba Aquarium, Japan

From November 2004 until December 2007, the West African Manatee Conservation Project completed Phase I. During this phase, residents of six African countries (Mauritania, Senegal, The Gambia, Guinea, Guinea-Bissau, and Sierra Leone) created a database of previously unknown information about the species (such as population, economic value, and habitat range) by conducting surveys in their countries. Other African countries also contributed reports that broadened the collective knowledge of the African manatee. Because of the work done during this phase, the general public, young children, and experienced scientists alike are receiving better information than ever before as to how to protect the African manatees. Phase I also allowed for up-close examination of the African manatee's way of life through field work.

Due to the large-scale success of Phase I, a Phase II is to be enacted by Wetlands International. During Phase II, the information collected in Phase I will be even more widely distributed around the areas in which the African manatee lives. Phase II will focus on furthering the existing research and adjusting legislation and education.

The African manatee is listed on Appendix I of the Convention on International Trade in Endangered Species (CITES), meaning international export or import is strictly regulated. Laws exist to protect the African manatee in every country in which it lives, but these laws are not well enforced. Due to this mass lack of enforcement and minimal education, the African manatee population is being steadily depleted.
