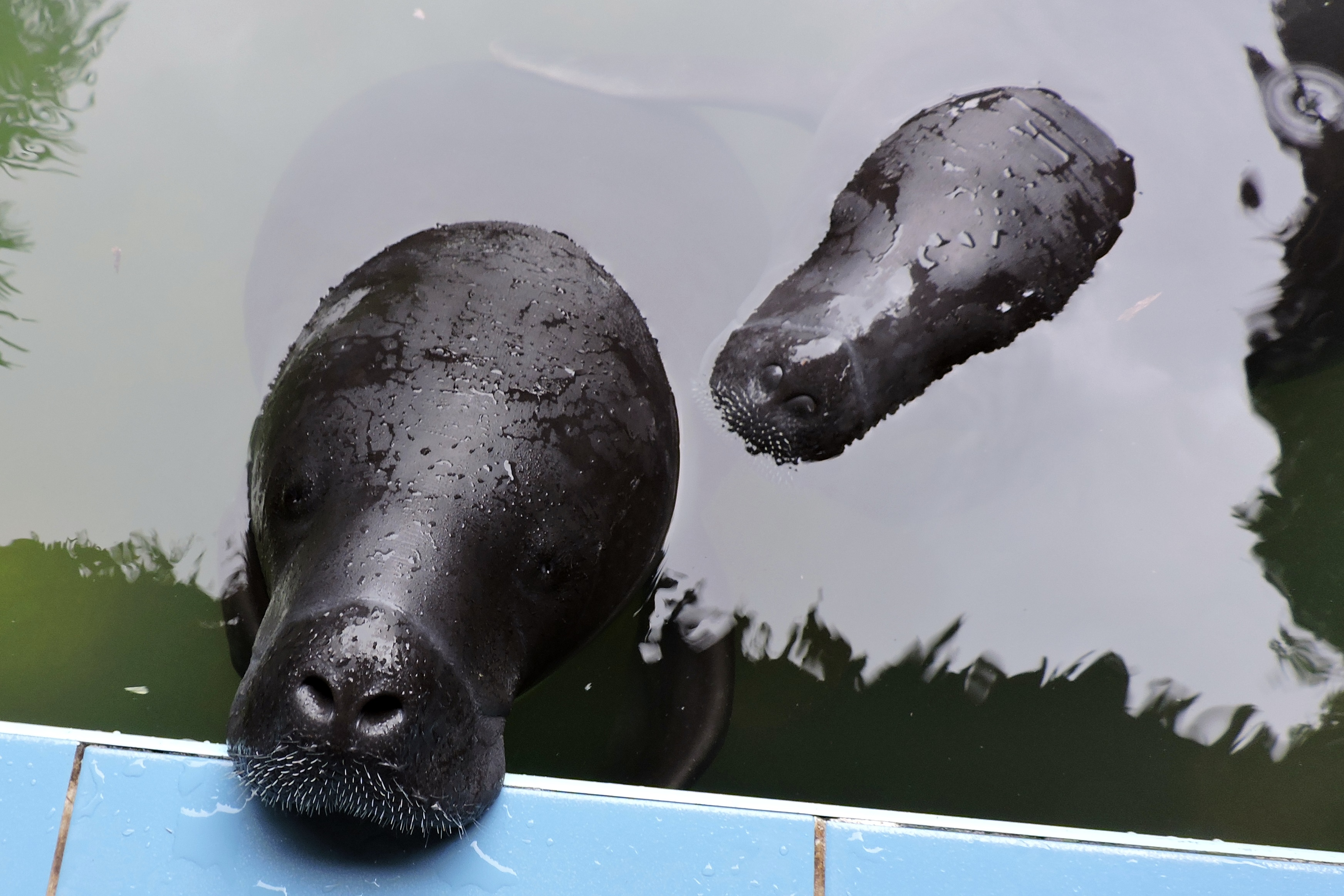

Conservation status
- Vulnerable (IUCN 3.1)
- CITES Appendix I

Scientific classification
- Kingdom: Animalia
- Phylum: Chordata
- Class: Mammalia
- Order: Sirenia
- Family: Trichechidae
- Genus: Trichechus
- Species: T. inunguis

Binomial name
- Trichechus inunguis (Natterer, 1883)
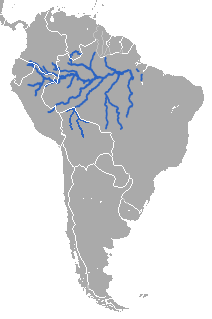
- Amazonian manatee range

= Amazonian manatee =

Species of mammal

The Amazonian manatee (Trichechus inunguis), commonly referred to as cowfish in Brazil, is a species of manatee that lives in the Amazon Basin in Brazil, Peru, Colombia and Ecuador. It has thin, wrinkled brownish or gray colored skin, with fine hairs scattered over its body and a white chest patch. It is the smallest of the three extant species of manatee.

== Taxonomy ==
The specific name, inunguis is Latin for "nailless". The genus name Trichechus, comes from Latin meaning "hair", referencing the whiskers around the manatee's mouth.

== Physical characteristics ==
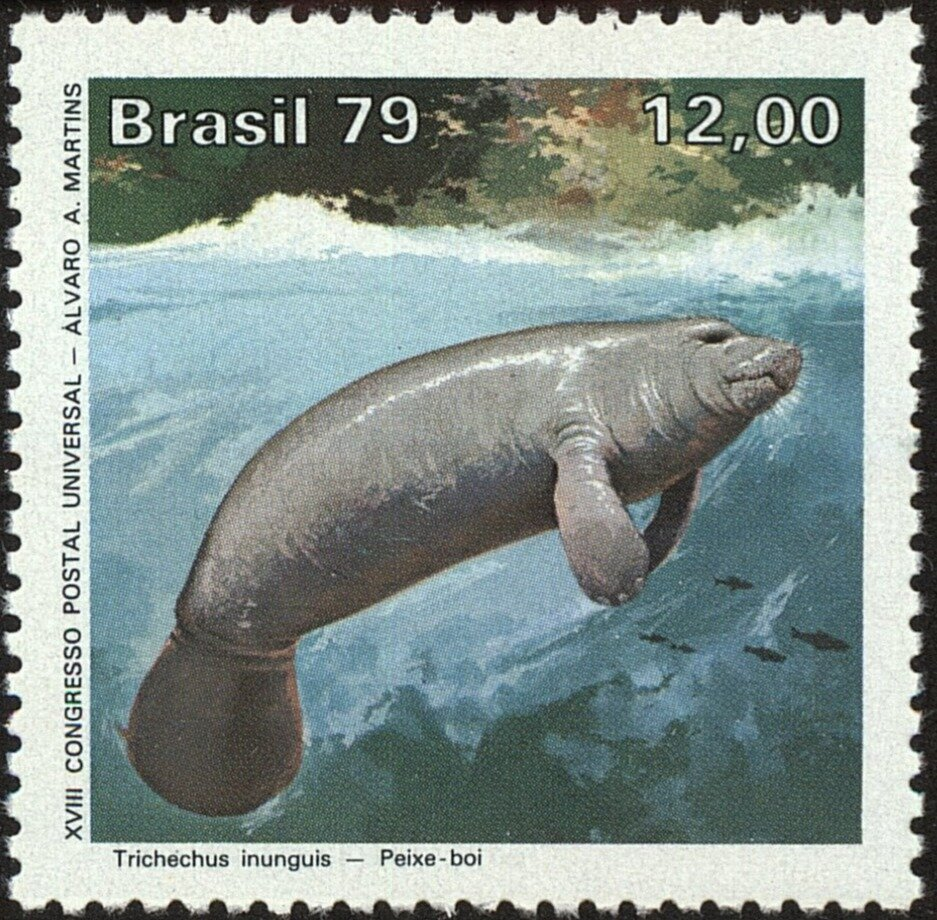
Brazilian stamp from 1979 illustrating an Amazonian manatee

The Amazonian manatee is the smallest member of the manatee family and can be distinguished by its smoother rubbery skin and lack of vestigial nails on its flippers. Ranges of body weight and size observed are 7.5–346 kg (17–763 lb) and 76.0–225 cm (2 ft 5.9 in – 7 ft 4.6 in) for captive males, 8.1–379 kg (18–836 lb) and 71.0–266 cm (2 ft 4.0 in – 8 ft 8.7 in) for captive females, and 120.0–270 kg (264.6–595.2 lb) and 162.0–230 cm (5 ft 3.8 in – 7 ft 6.6 in) for free-ranging manatees, respectively. The maximum actual Amazonian manatee weight reported is 379 kilograms (836 lb). Calves of the species are born weighing 10–15 kg (22–33 lb) and 85–105 cm (33–41 in) long. The Amazonian Manatees increase in length approximately 1.6-2.0 mm per day. This length is measured along the curvature of the body so absolute length can differ between individuals. As calves, they gain an average of 1 kilogram per week.

Amazonian manatees are large, cylindrically shaped mammals, with forelimbs modified into flippers, no free hind-limbs, and the rear of the body in the form of a flat, rounded, horizontal paddle. The flexible flippers are used for aiding motion over the bottom, scratching, touching, and even embracing other manatees, and moving food into and cleaning the mouth. The manatee's upper lip is modified into a large bristly surface, which is deeply divided. It can move each side of the lips independently while feeding. The general coloration is grey, and most Amazonian manatees have a distinct white or bright pink patch on the breast.

Amazonian manatees, similar to all living manatee species in the family Trichechidae, have polyphyodont teeth. Their teeth are continuously replaced horizontally from the caudal portion of the jaw to the rostral portion throughout the manatee's life, a unique trait among mammals. Only the closest living relative of order Sirenia, elephants, show a similar characteristic of teeth replacement, but elephants have a limited set of these replacement teeth. As the teeth migrate rostrally in the manatee, the roots will be resorbed and the thin enamel will wear down until the tooth is eventually shed. Referred to as cheek teeth, differentiation of manatee teeth into molars and premolars has not occurred, and manatees additionally do not have incisors or canine teeth. These teeth migrate at a rate of about 1–2 mm/month, based on wear and chewing rates.

The Amazonian manatee lacks nails on its flippers, setting it apart from other manatees. Additionally, Amazonian manatees have a very small degree of rostral deflection (30.4°), which can be used as an indication of where in the water column the animal feeds. A small degree of deflection means that the end of the snout is straighter with regard to the caudal portion of the jaw. Animals with a greater degree of deflection, such as D. dugong at about 70° of deflection, are more of a benthic species, feed on the seafloor, and have snouts that point almost completely ventrally. Only T. senegalensis has a smaller rostral deflection of about 25.8°. This is believed to maximize the efficiency of feeding. A small degree of rostral deflection allows Amazonian manatees to feed more effectively at the surface of the water, where much of their food is found.

== Behavior and biology ==
The Amazonian manatee is the only sirenian that lives exclusively in freshwater habitat. The species relies on changes in the peripheral circulation for its primary mechanism for thermoregulation by using sphincters to deflect blood flow from areas of the body in close contact with water. They also rely on subcutaneous fat to reduce heat loss.

Manatees have nostrils, not blowholes like cetaceans, which close when underwater to keep water out and open when above water to breathe. Although manatees can remain under water for extended periods, surfacing for air about every five minutes is common. The longest documented submergence of an Amazonian manatee in captivity is 14 minutes.

Manatees make seasonal movements synchronized with the flood regime of the Amazon Basin. They are found in flooded forests and meadows during the flood season, when food is abundant. The Amazonian manatee has the smallest degree of rostral deflection (25° to 41°) among sirenians, an adaptation to feed closer to the water surface. It is both nocturnal and diurnal and lives its life almost entirely underwater. Only its nostrils protrude from the surface of the water while it searches river and lake bottoms for vegetation.

The Amazonian and West Indian manatees are the only manatees known to vocalize. They have been observed vocalizing alone and with others, particularly between cows and their calves.

=== Diet ===
The manatees themselves feed on a variety of aquatic macrophytes, including aroids (especially Pistia, aka "water lettuce"), grasses, bladderworts, hornworts, water lilies, and particularly, water hyacinths. They are also known to eat palm fruits that fall into the water. Maintaining a herbivorous diet, the manatee has a similar post-gastric digestive process to that of the horse. The manatee consumes approximately 8% of its body weight in food per day.

During the July–August dry season when water levels begin to fall, some populations become restricted to the deep parts of large lakes, where they often remain until the end of the dry season in March. They are thought to fast during this period, their large fat reserves and low metabolic rates – only 36% of the usual placental mammal metabolic rate – allowing them to survive for up to seven months with little or no food.

=== Reproduction and lifecycle ===
The Amazonian manatee is a seasonal breeder with a gestational period of 12–14 months and a prolonged calving period. Most births take place between December and July, with about 63% between February and May, during a time of rising river levels in their native region. After the calf is born, it will begin to eat while staying with its mother for 12 – 18 months.

Wild individuals have a lifespan of about 30 years. The record captive lifespan is 17 years.

== Population and distribution ==
As of 1977 the population count of the Amazonian manatee was estimated to be around 10,000. As of now the total population count is undetermined, however the population trend seems to be decreasing. They are mainly distributed throughout the Amazon River Basin in northern South America, ranging from the Marajó Islands in Brazil through Colombia, Peru, and Ecuador. They are occasionally found overlapping with the West Indian manatee along the coasts of Brazil.

Amazonian manatees occur through most of the Amazon River drainage, from the headwaters, in Colombia, Ecuador and Peru to the mouth of the Amazon (close to the Marajó Island) in Brazil over an estimated seven million square kilometers. However, their distribution is patchy, concentrating in areas of nutrient-rich flooded forest, which covers around 300,000 km^{2} They also inhabit environments in lowland tropical areas below 300 m asl, where there is large production of aquatic and semi-aquatic plants; they are also found in calm, shallow waters, away from human settlements.

The Amazonian manatee is completely aquatic and never leaves the water. It is the only manatee to occur exclusively in freshwater environments. The Amazonian manatee favors backwater lakes, oxbows, and lagoons with deep connections to large rivers and abundant aquatic vegetation. They are mainly solitary but sometimes they will gather in small groups consisting of up to eight individuals. They engage in long seasonal movements, moving from flooded areas during the wet season to deep water-bodies during the dry season.

Natural predators include jaguars, sharks, and caimans (spectacled caiman, black caiman, Cuvier's dwarf caiman, and smooth-fronted caiman).

== Illegal hunting ==
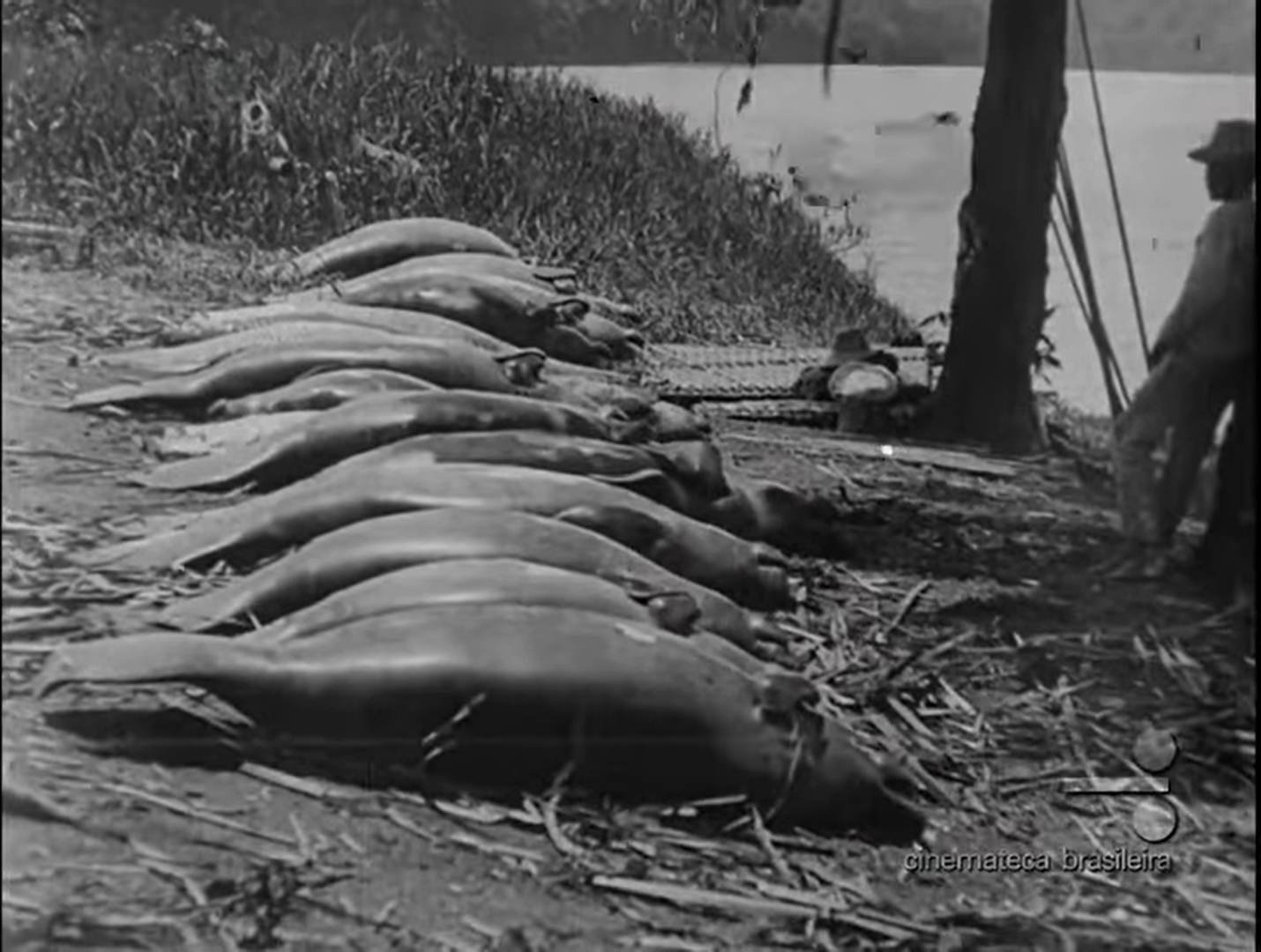
Dead Amazonian manatees hunted in Brazil, c. 1920

The main threat to the Amazonian manatee is illegal hunting. They are hunted for subsistent and local use, not commercially. The hunting has led to the large decline in the population and low population numbers. Between 1935 and 1954, over 140,000 manatees are estimated to have been killed. Despite the laws in place against hunting, hunting continues to occur even in protected areas. Traditional harpoons are the most common weapon used against the manatees, but in Ecuador they are also known to be caught in Arapaima fish traps.

They are mainly hunted for their high value meat but the fat and skin are also used for cooking and in medicines. The meat is sold locally to neighbors or at produce markets. It can be illegally sold as sausage or mixira in public markets in Brazil and Ecuador. Mixira is a meat preserved in its own fat and is expensive which drives the hunters.

Between 2011 and 2015, 195 manatees were killed for meat in a single region of Brazil. In another region, 460 were killed in a protected area between 2004 and 2014.

== Conservation ==
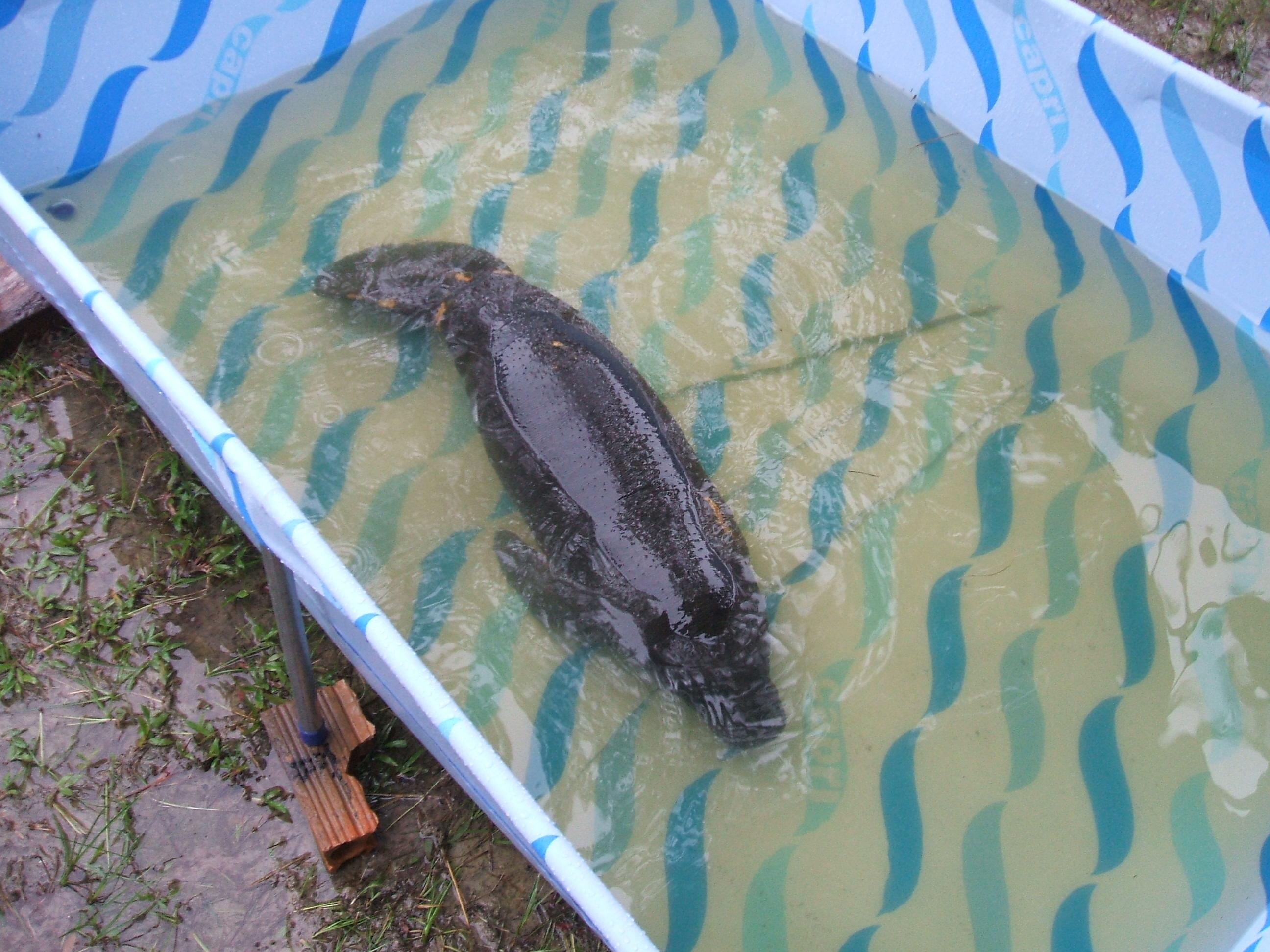
Rehabilitation of an infant at "IBAMA" on Marajó

The IUCN red list ranks the Amazonian manatee as vulnerable. Population declines are primarily a result of hunting, as well as calf mortality, climate change, and habitat loss. However, due to their murky water habitat it is difficult to gain accurate population estimates.

There are no national management plans for the Amazonian Manatee, except in Colombia. As of 2008, the INPA takes care of 34 captive manatees and the CPPMA is caring for 31 manatees. The manatee has been protected by Peruvian law since 1973, via Supreme Decree 934-73-AG, prohibiting hunting and commercial use of the manatee.

Hunting remains the largest problem and continues in much of its range, even within reserves. In 1986, it was estimated that the hunting levels in Ecuador were unsustainable and it would be gone from this country within 10–15 years. While hunting still occurs, an increasing risk to its continued survival in Ecuador is now believed to be the risk of oil spills. The oil exploration also means an increase in boat traffic on the rivers.

The Amazonian manatees of Peru have experienced much of their decline due to hunting by human populations for meat, blubber, skin and other materials that can be collected from the manatee. Such hunting is carried out with harpoons, gillnets, and set traps. Much of this hunting occurs in the lakes and streams near the Pacaya-Samiria National Reserve in northeastern Peru. The species is slow-moving, docile, and is often found feeding at the surface of the lakes and rivers it inhabits. Manatees are also at risk from pollution, accidental drowning in commercial fishing nets, and the degradation of vegetation by soil erosion resulting from deforestation. Additionally, the indiscriminate release of mercury in mining activities threatens the entire aquatic ecosystem of the Amazon Basin.

== See also ==
- Unihemispheric slow-wave sleep
- Evolution of sirenians
