= Rick Perry =

American politician (born 1950)

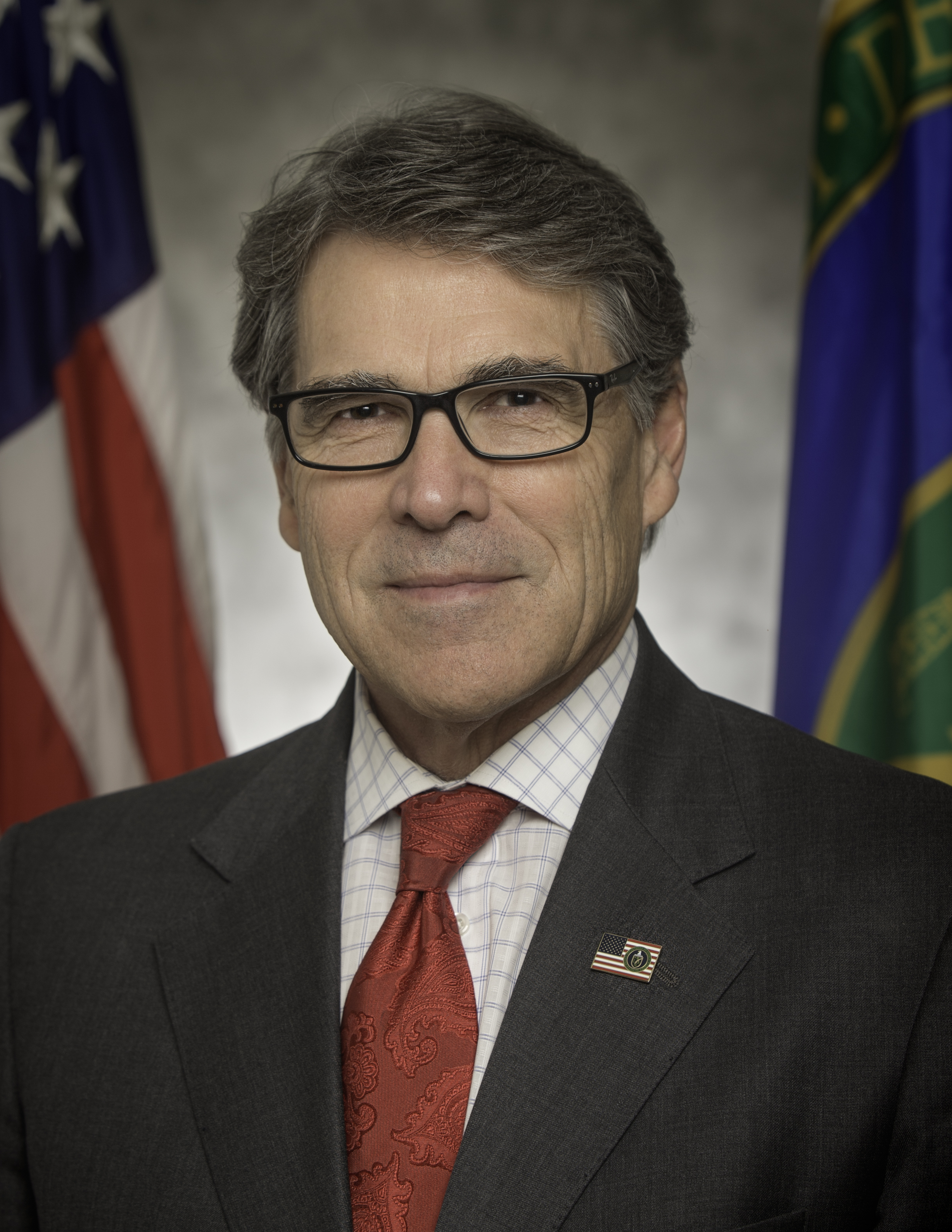
- Official portrait, 2017

14th United States Secretary of Energy
- In office March 2, 2017 – December 1, 2019
- President: Donald Trump
- Deputy: Dan Brouillette
- Preceded by: Ernest Moniz
- Succeeded by: Dan Brouillette

47th Governor of Texas
- In office December 21, 2000 – January 20, 2015
- Lieutenant: Bill Ratliff; David Dewhurst
- Preceded by: George W. Bush
- Succeeded by: Greg Abbott

39th Lieutenant Governor of Texas
- In office January 19, 1999 – December 21, 2000
- Governor: George W. Bush
- Preceded by: Bob Bullock
- Succeeded by: Bill Ratliff

9th Agriculture Commissioner of Texas
- In office January 15, 1991 – January 19, 1999
- Governor: Ann Richards; George W. Bush
- Preceded by: Jim Hightower
- Succeeded by: Susan Combs

Member of the Texas House of Representatives from the 64th district
- In office January 8, 1985 – January 8, 1991
- Preceded by: Joe Hanna
- Succeeded by: John R. Cook

Personal details
- Born: James Richard Perry; March 4, 1950 (age 76) Haskell, Texas, U.S.
- Party: Republican (since 1989)
- Other political affiliations: Democratic (before 1989)
- Spouse: Anita Thigpen (m. 1982)
- Children: 2
- Education: Texas A&M University (BS)

Military service
- Allegiance: United States
- Branch/service: United States Air Force
- Years of service: 1972–1977
- Rank: Captain
- Unit: 772nd Tactical Airlift Squadron

James Richard Perry (born March 4, 1950) is an American politician who served as the 14th United States secretary of energy from 2017 to 2019. He previously served as the 47th governor of Texas from 2000 to 2015 and ran unsuccessfully for the Republican nomination for president of the United States in the 2012 and 2016 elections.

Born into a family of cotton farmers in Haskell, Texas, Perry graduated from Texas A&M University in 1972 and entered into the United States Air Force, serving a five-year stint and achieving the rank of captain. After leaving the Air Force in 1977, Perry returned to Texas and entered politics, serving as a member of the Texas House of Representatives from 1985 to 1991. Initially a Democrat, Perry switched parties in 1989 and became a Republican, and was elected Agriculture Commissioner of Texas the following year. In 1998, Perry was elected lieutenant governor of Texas, becoming the state's first Republican lieutenant governor since Reconstruction.

Perry assumed the governorship of Texas in December 2000, after Governor George W. Bush resigned following his election as president. Perry was elected governor in 2002 and was re-elected in 2006 and 2010, becoming the longest-serving governor in Texas history. As governor, Perry identified as a staunch conservative, enacting conservative fiscal policies, restrictions on abortion and expanded gun rights. Long considered a potential presidential candidate, Perry officially announced his candidacy for the 2012 Republican nomination for president in August 2011. Perry initially performed well in polling and showed strong fundraising prowess, leading to him being considered a serious contender for the nomination. However, his support declined following debates and early primaries, and he withdrew from the race in January 2012.

Perry declined to seek re-election to a fourth term as governor and left office in 2015, launching a second presidential campaign shortly thereafter. Perry's second presidential campaign failed to garner substantial polling support, fundraising or media attention, leading him to withdraw from the race after only three months. Perry was initially a vocal opponent of Donald Trump's 2016 presidential campaign, however, he later endorsed Trump after he secured the Republican nomination. After winning the presidency, Trump appointed Perry as Secretary of Energy, and he was confirmed by the United States Senate in a 62–37 vote on March 2, 2017. On October 17, 2019, Perry reported to Trump that he intended to resign at the end of the year. His departure came amid scrutiny of his involvement in the Trump–Ukraine scandal, which subsequently led to Trump's impeachment. He left office on December 1, 2019.

== Early life ==
A fifth-generation Texan, Perry was born on March 4, 1950, in Haskell, Texas, and raised in Paint Creek, Texas, the son of dryland cotton farmers Joseph Ray Perry and Amelia June Holt Perry. He has one older sister. Perry's ancestry is almost entirely English, dating as far back as the original Thirteen Colonies. His family has been in Texas since before the Texas Revolution.

His father, a Democrat, was a long-time Haskell County commissioner and school board member. Perry has said that his interest in politics probably began in November 1961, when his father took him to the funeral of U.S. Representative Sam Rayburn.

Perry was in the Boy Scouts of America (BSA) and earned the rank of Eagle Scout. The BSA has honored Perry with the Distinguished Eagle Scout Award.

=== College ===
Perry attended Texas A&M University where he was a member of the Corps of Cadets and the Alpha Gamma Rho fraternity. He was elected senior class social secretary, a member and redpot in Aggie Bonfire, and one of A&M's five "yell leaders". He graduated in 1972 with a Bachelor of Science degree in animal science.

In 1989, he said, "I was probably a bit of a free spirit, not particularly structured real well for life outside of a military regime, I would have not lasted at Texas Tech or the University of Texas. I would have hit the fraternity scene and lasted about one semester."

=== First jobs ===
In the early 1970s, Perry interned during several summers with Southwestern Advantage, as a door-to-door book salesman. "I count my time working for Dortch Oldham [then president of the Southwestern family of companies] as one of the most important formative experiences of my life", Perry said in 2010. "There is nothing that tests your commitment to a goal like getting a few doors closed in your face." He said that "Mr. Oldham taught legions of young people to communicate quickly, clearly and with passion, a lesson that has served me well in my life since then."

Upon graduation from college in 1972, Perry was commissioned as an officer in the United States Air Force and completed pilot training in February 1974. He was then assigned as a Lockheed C-130 Hercules pilot with the 772nd Tactical Airlift Squadron at Dyess Air Force Base, located in Abilene, Texas. Perry's duties included two-month overseas rotations at RAF Mildenhall, located in Mildenhall, England, and Rhein-Main Air Base, located at Frankfurt am Main, Germany. His missions included a 1974 U.S. State Department drought relief effort in Mali, Mauritania and Chad, and, in 1976, earthquake relief in Guatemala. He left the Air Force in 1977 at the rank of captain, returned to Texas, and went into farming cotton with his father.

== Early political career ==
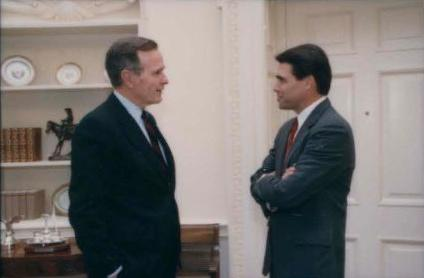
Perry with President George H. W. Bush in 1990

=== Texas Legislature ===
In 1984, Perry was elected to the Texas House of Representatives as a Democrat from district 64, which included his home county of Haskell. He served on the House Appropriations and Calendars committees during his three two-year terms in office. He befriended fellow freshman state representative Lena Guerrero, a staunch liberal Democrat who endorsed Perry's reelection bid in 2006.

Perry was part of the "Pit Bulls", a group of Appropriations members who sat on the lower dais in the committee room ("the pit") who pushed for austere state budgets during the 1980s. At one point, The Dallas Morning News named him one of the ten most effective members of the legislature.

In 1987, Perry voted for a $5.7 billion tax increase proposed by Republican Governor Bill Clements. Perry supported Al Gore in the 1988 Democratic presidential primaries and worked for Gore's campaign in Texas. On September 29, 1989, Perry announced that he was switching parties, becoming a Republican. On a guest appearance on Fox show Hannity, he partially credits Ronald Reagan as part of the reason he became a Republican, also stating he switched political parties sooner in his life than Reagan.

=== Agriculture Commissioner ===
In 1990, as a newly minted Republican, Perry challenged Jim Hightower, the incumbent Democratic Agriculture Commissioner. Karl Rove was Perry's campaign manager.

In the Republican primary on March 13, 1990, Perry polled 276,558 votes (47%), with Richard McIver garnering 176,976 votes (30%) and Gene L. Duke, who placed third, polling 132,497 votes (23%). Since Perry fell shy of the necessary 50% to win outright, a runoff was held between Perry and McIver set on April 10, 1990. In the runoff, he emerged victorious, garnering 96,649 votes (69%) to McIver's 43,921 votes (31%). During 1990, Hightower's office was embroiled in an FBI investigation into corruption and bribery. Three aides were convicted in 1993 of using public funds for political fundraising, although Hightower himself was not found to be involved in the wrongdoings. Perry narrowly defeated Hightower in November 1990, garnering 1,864,463 votes (49%) to Hightower's 1,820,145 votes (48%). Rove raised $3 million to raise Perry's profile, "while tarnishing the name of Jim Hightower" resulting in Perry's name becoming a "household name in Texas—and Hightower's name synonymous with corruption". As Agriculture Commissioner, Perry was responsible for promoting the sale of Texas farm produce to other states and foreign nations, and for supervising the calibration of weights and measures, such as gasoline pumps and grocery store scales.

In April 1993, Perry, while serving as Texas agriculture commissioner, expressed support for the effort to reform the nation's healthcare, describing it as "most commendable". The healthcare plan, first revealed in September, was ultimately unsuccessful due to Republican congressional opposition. In 2005, after being questioned on the issue by a potential opponent in the Republican governor primary, Perry said he expressed his support only in order to get the Clintons to pay more attention to rural healthcare.

In 1994, Perry was reelected Agriculture Commissioner by a large margin, getting 2,546,287 votes (62 percent) to Democrat Marvin Gregory's 1,479,692 (36 percent). Libertarian Clyde L. Garland received the remaining 85,836 votes (2 percent). Gregory, a chicken farmer from Sulphur Springs, Texas, was on the Texas Agricultural Finance Authority with Perry in the early '90s as a Republican but became a Democrat before running against Perry in 1994.

=== Lieutenant governor ===
In 1998, Perry ran for lieutenant governor. During this election, Perry had a notable falling out with his previous top political strategist Karl Rove, which began the much-reported rivalry between the Bush and Perry camps. Perry polled 1,858,837 votes (50.05 percent) to the 1,790,106 (48.20 percent) cast for Democrat John Sharp. Perry became the state's first Republican lieutenant governor since Reconstruction, taking office on January 19, 1999.

== Governor of Texas ==
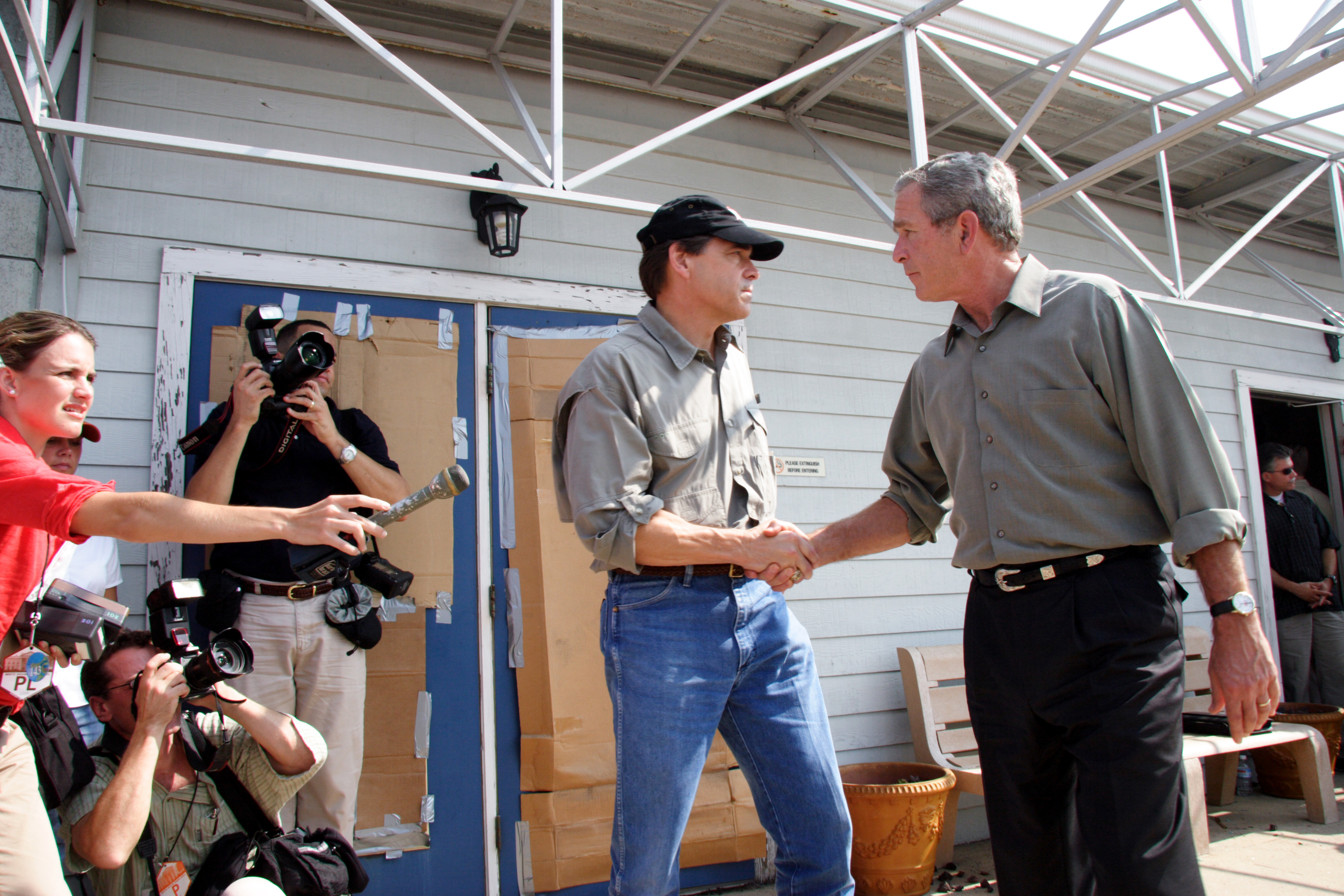
President George W. Bush and Texas Governor Rick Perry shake hands September 27, 2005, after a question-and-answer session at the Port Arthur airport. Port Arthur suffered extensive damage from Hurricane Rita.

Perry assumed the office of governor on December 21, 2000, following the resignation of George W. Bush—who was preparing to become president of the United States. He won the office in his own right in the 2002 gubernatorial election, where he received 58% of votes to Laredo oilman and businessman Tony Sanchez's 40%. He was re-elected in the 2006 gubernatorial election against three major opponents, polling 39% of votes against runner-up former U.S. Congressman Chris Bell of Houston with 30%. Former Republican Comptroller, Carole Keeton Strayhorn, running as an independent, garnered 18% of the vote and comic/author/musician, Kinky Friedman, also running as an independent, garnered over 12%. In the 2010 gubernatorial election, Perry became the first Texas governor to be elected to three four-year terms, polling 55% of votes to former Houston Mayor Bill White's 42%.

In the 2001 legislative session, Perry set a record for his use of the veto, rejecting 82 acts, more than any other governor in any single legislative session in the history of the state since Reconstruction.

Perry is one of five governors of Texas to have served three terms, the others being Allan Shivers, Price Daniel, John Connally and later Greg Abbott. He is the longest-serving governor in Texas history. He had served for 14 years by the time he left office, making him the second longest-serving U.S. governor at the time, behind Terry Branstad of Iowa.

=== Fiscal policies ===
In his presidential campaign, Perry highlighted the economic success Texas achieved under his governorship. The efficacy of Perry's economic policies has been questioned by some sources, including Ezra Klein.

A proclaimed proponent of fiscal conservatism, Perry often campaigned on job growth and tax issues, such as his opposition to creating a state income tax. In 2002, Perry refused to promise not to raise taxes as governor, and in the following years did propose or approve various tax and debt increases. In 2009, Perry signed Grover Norquist's pledge to "oppose and veto any and all efforts to increase taxes".

Texas began borrowing money in 2003 to pay for roads and was projected to owe $17.3 billion by the end of 2012, increasing total state debt from $13.4 billion in 2001 to $37.8 billion in 2011. The state's public finance authority sold $2 billion in bonds for unemployment benefits, and it was authorized to sell $1.5 billion more if necessary. Texas federal borrowing topped $1.6 billion in October 2010, before the bond sales.

In 2003, Perry signed legislation that created the Texas Enterprise Fund, which has since given $435 million in grants to businesses. The New York Times reported that many of the companies receiving grants, or their chief executives, have made contributions to Perry's campaigns or to the Republican Governors Association. (Perry became chairman of the group in 2008 and again in 2011.) Perry was criticized for supporting corporate tax breaks and other incentives, while the state government was experiencing budget deficits.

=== Healthcare ===
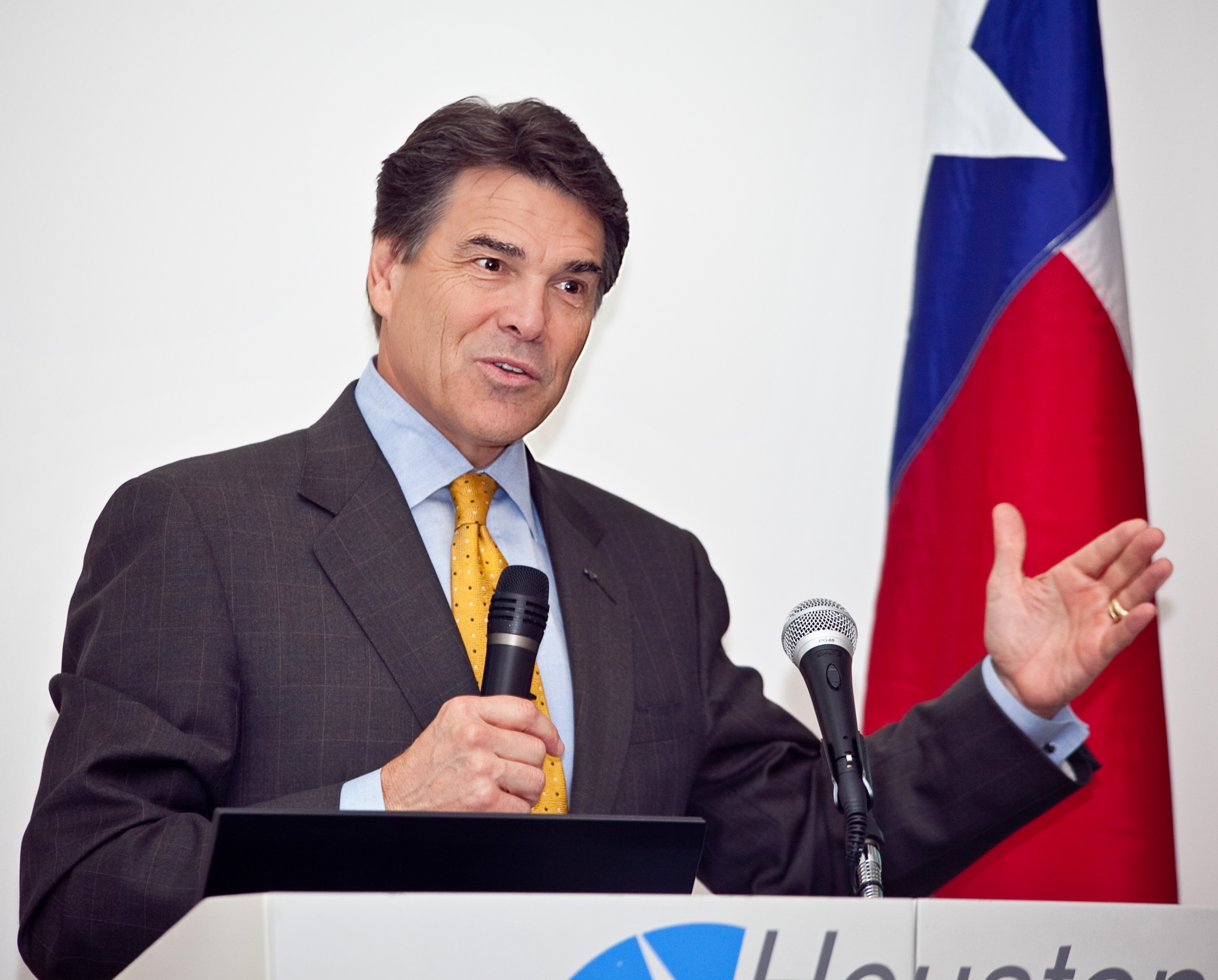
Perry speaking at the Houston Technology Center in 2010

As governor, Perry was an opponent of federal health-care reform proposals and of the Patient Protection and Affordable Care Act, describing the latter as "socialism on American soil". His focus in Texas was on tort reform, signing a bill in 2003 that restricted non-economic damages in medical malpractice judgments. Perry touted this approach in his presidential campaign, although independent analysts have concluded that it has failed to increase the supply of physicians or limit health-care costs in Texas. A separate 2013 study, however, reported increased physician growth after the 2003 reforms.

During Perry's governorship, Texas rose from second to first among states with the highest proportion of uninsured residents at 26%, and had the lowest level of access to prenatal care in the U.S. Perry and the state legislature cut Medicaid spending. The Los Angeles Times wrote that under Perry, "working Texans increasingly have been priced out of private healthcare while the state's safety net has withered."

Perry's office said that Texas represents a model private-sector approach to healthcare. His spokeswoman said, "Texas does provide an adequate safety net to those truly in need... and many individuals simply choose not to purchase healthcare coverage."

In December 2011, Perry said he had undergone a "transformation" and now opposed abortions, even in cases of rape and incest. The next day he clarified that he would allow an exception for abortions that would save a mother's life.

In February 2007, Perry issued an executive order mandating that Texas girls receive the HPV vaccine, which protects against some strains of the human papilloma virus, a contributing factor to some forms of cervical cancer. Following the move, news outlets reported various apparent financial connections between Perry and the vaccine's manufacturer, Merck. Merck's political action committee has contributed $28,500 since 2001 to Perry's campaigns. Perry later reversed his position, calling the vaccine mandate a "mistake". In May 2007, the Texas Legislature passed a bill undoing the order; Perry did not veto the bill, saying the veto would have been overruled, but blamed lawmakers who supported the bill for the deaths of future Texan cervical cancer victims.

On July 1, 2011, Perry both had adult stem cell surgery in Houston and started "laying the groundwork" for the commercialization of the adult stem cell industry in Texas.

=== Religion ===
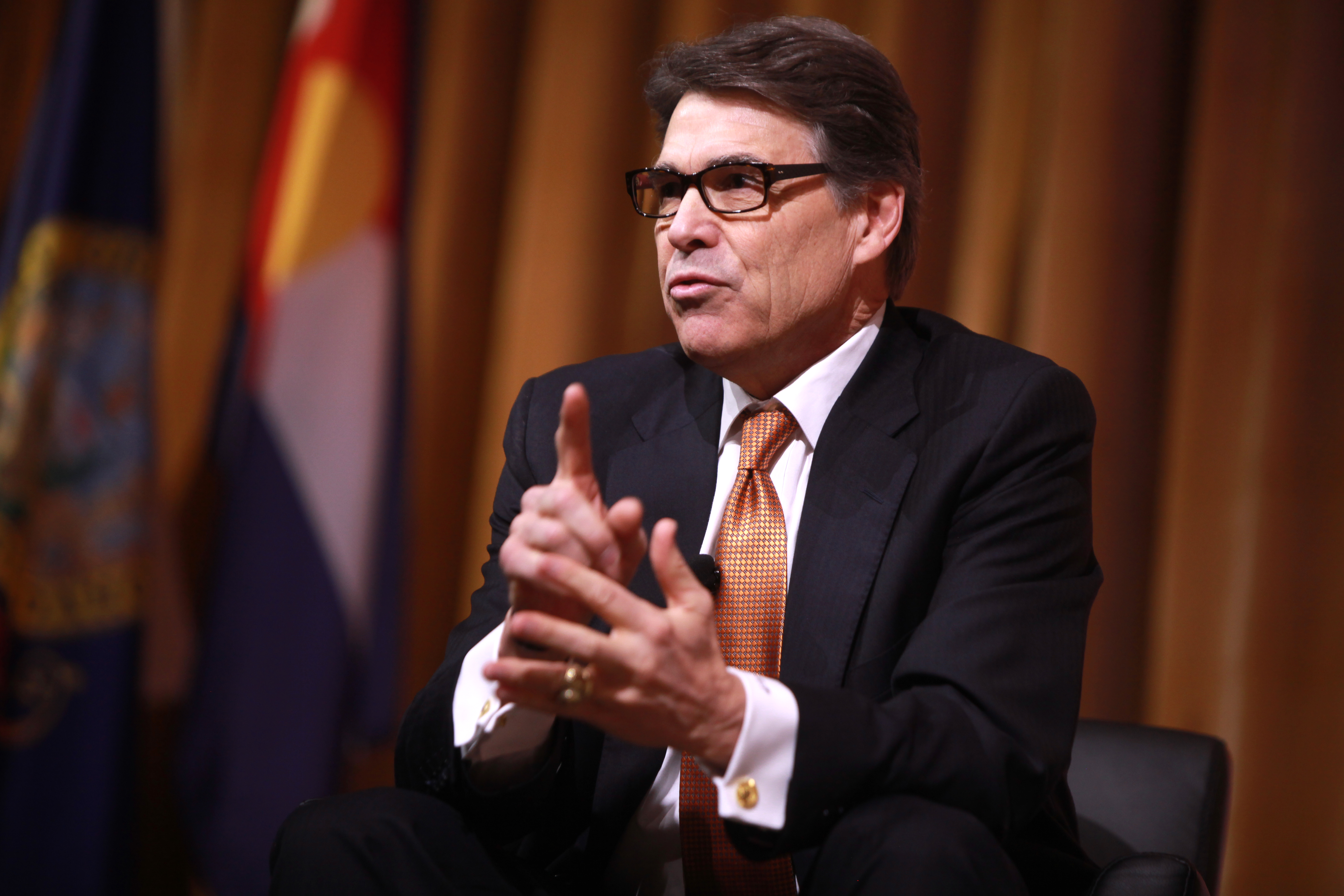
Perry speaking at the 2014 Conservative Political Action Conference in Maryland

In 2006, Perry said he believed in the inerrancy of the Bible and that those who do not accept Jesus as their Savior will go to hell. A couple of days later, he clarified, "I don't know that there's any human being that has the ability to interpret what God and his final decision-making is going to be."

In his 2008 book On My Honor, Perry expressed his views on the Establishment Clause and the Free Exercise Clause of the U.S. Constitution. "Let's be clear: I don't believe government, which taxes people regardless of their faith, should espouse a specific faith. I also don't think we should allow a small minority of atheists to sanitize our civil dialogue of religious references."

In June 2011, Perry proclaimed August 6 as a Day of Prayer and Fasting, inviting other governors to join him in a prayer meeting hosted by the American Family Association in Houston. The event was criticized as going beyond prayer and fasting to include launching Perry's presidential campaign.

Perry has called himself "a firm believer in intelligent design as a matter of faith and intellect" and has expressed support for its teaching alongside evolution in Texas schools but has also said that "educators and local school officials, not the governor, should determine science curriculum".

=== Education ===
In 2005, Perry said he would not "approve an education budget that shortchanges teacher salary increases, textbooks, education technology, and education reforms. And I cannot let $2 billion sit in some bank account when it can go directly to the classroom".

Following a second rejection of Perry's bill, Perry asked John Sharp to head a task force charged with preparing a bipartisan education plan, which was subsequently adopted.

In 2001, Perry expressed his pride in the enactment of the statute extending in-state tuition to undocumented immigrants who meet Texas' residency requirements. It also required the undocumented students to pledge to apply for permanent residency or citizenship if this became a possibility for them. In September 2014, Gov. Perry stated during a debate his continuous support for the program.

=== LGBT rights ===
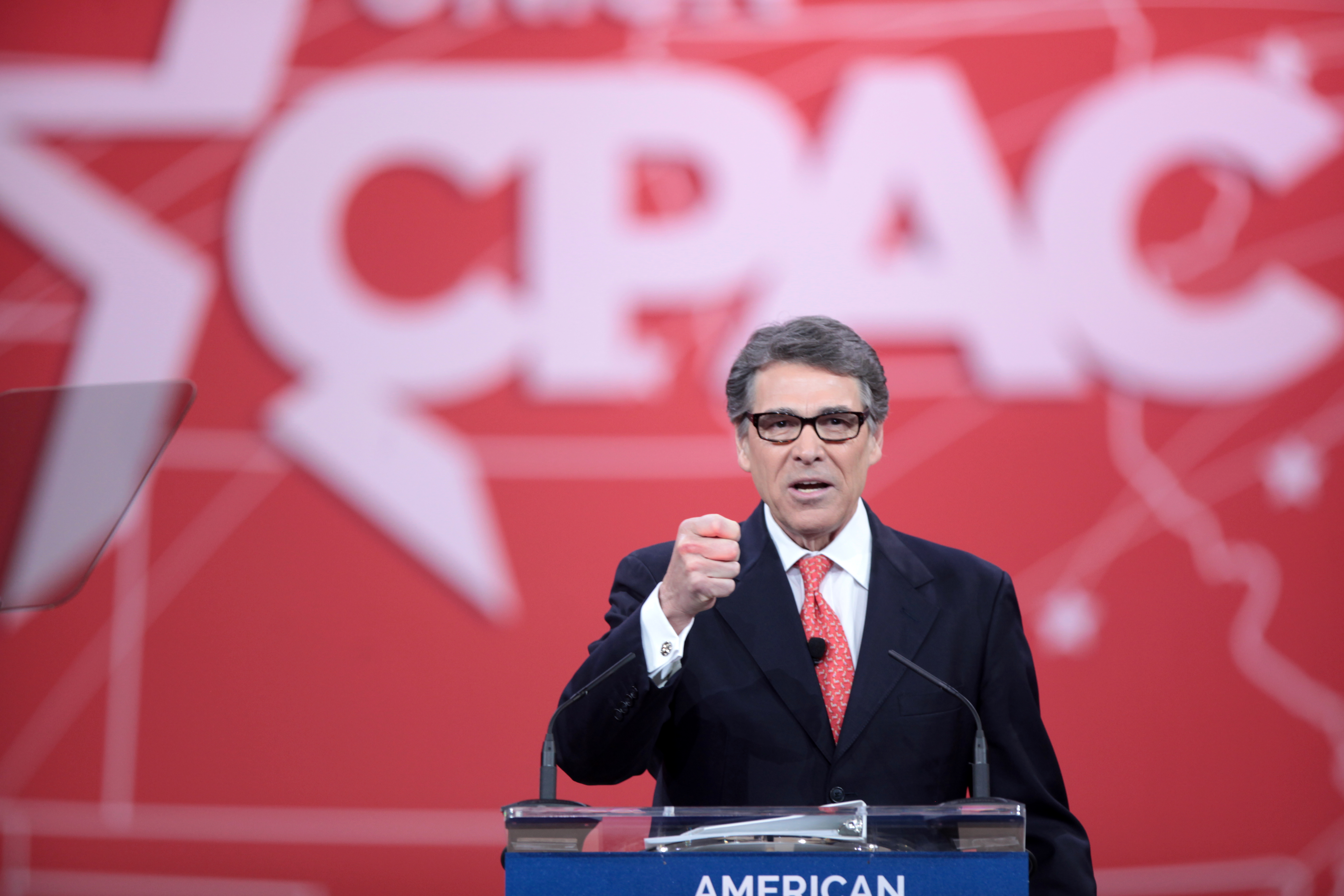
Perry speaking at the 2015 Conservative Political Action Conference in National Harbor, Maryland

Perry opposed several LGBT rights measures, including legal recognition of same-sex relationships and openly gay military service, and drew criticism from LGBT rights organizations for his public comments and policy positions.

In 2002, Perry described the Texas same-sex anti-sodomy law as "appropriate". The following year, the U.S. Supreme Court struck down the statute in Lawrence v. Texas, determining that it violated the Fourteenth Amendment to the Constitution.

In his 2010 book, Perry referenced the Lawrence decision, writing "Texans have a different view of the world than do the nine oligarchs in robes." In 2011, Perry admitted that he did not know about the Lawrence decision; when told that the Supreme Court case had struck down Texas's anti-sodomy law, Perry said: "I'm not taking the bar exam [...] I don't know what a lot of legal cases [...] My position on traditional marriage is clear [...] I don't need a federal law case to explain it to me."

Perry supported Texas Proposition 2 in 2005, a ballot proposition that amended the Texas constitution by defining marriage as "only a union between a man and a woman" and prohibiting the state from creating or recognizing "any legal status identical or similar to marriage" (such as civil unions).

In 2011, after New York legalized same-sex marriage, Perry said it was their right to do so under the principle of states' rights in the Tenth Amendment. A spokesman later reiterated Perry's support for a federal constitutional amendment banning same-sex marriage, saying that position was not inconsistent, since an amendment would require ratification by three-fourths of the states.

After the U.S. Supreme Court ruled in Obergefell v. Hodges in 2015 that the fundamental right to marry is guaranteed to same-sex couples by the Constitution, Perry condemned the decision, saying: "I'm a firm believer in traditional marriage, and I also believe the 10th Amendment leaves it to each state to decide this issue."

In his first book, On My Honor, published in 2008, Perry compared homosexuality to alcoholism, writing that he is "no expert on the 'nature versus nurture' debate" but gays should simply choose abstinence. Perry's comments were criticized by LGBT rights groups.

During the 2012 presidential campaign, he criticized the repeal of the "don't ask, don't tell" policy for the U.S. military. In a 2011 campaign ad, he stated: "there's something wrong in this country when gays can serve openly in the military" and later defended the ad, saying he was "very comfortable" with it. Perry said using foreign aid as a policy tool against foreign countries that violate the human rights of homosexuals was "not in America's interests" and was part of a "war on traditional American values".

Perry, an Eagle Scout, called on the Boy Scouts in 2013 to continue their ban on homosexuality.

=== Crime ===
Perry's campaigns for lieutenant governor and governor focused on a tough stance on crime. He has supported block grants for crime programs.

Jeff L. Blackburn, chief counsel of the Innocence Project of Texas, said of Perry that "He has done more good than any other governor we've ever had [...] unless, of course, it involves the death penalty. On the death penalty, Rick Perry has a profound mental block."

In 2001, Perry signed the James Byrd Jr. Hate Crimes Act, which strengthened penalties for crimes motivated by a person's race, color, disability, religion, national origin or ancestry, age, gender or sexual preference. The law was opposed by previous governor George Bush, who insisted that "all crimes are hate crimes."

In 2007, Perry signed a law ending automatic arrest for cannabis possession.

=== Death penalty ===
Perry supports the death penalty. In June 2001, he vetoed a ban on the execution of intellectually disabled inmates. In 2011, during a televised debate for presidential candidates, he said he had "never struggled" with the question of the possible innocence of any of the 234 inmates executed to date while he was governor.

Cases in which Perry has been criticized for his lack of intervention include those of Cameron Todd Willingham and Mexican nationals José Medellín and Humberto Leal Garcia.

Perry commuted the death sentence of Kenneth Foster, who was convicted of murder despite evidence that he was only present at the scene of the crime. Foster was convicted under a Texas law that makes co-conspirators liable in certain cases of homicide. In this case, it tied Foster to the triggerman. Perry raised doubts about the law and urged the legislature to re-examine the issue. "I believe the right and just decision is to commute Foster's sentence from the death penalty to life imprisonment," Perry said.

Perry also refused to grant a stay of execution in 2004 in the case of Cameron Todd Willingham, amid later questions about the reliability of the original arson investigation. The Texas Forensic Science Commission subsequently examined the forensic evidence in the case. Perry said in 2009 that "Willingham was a monster. He was a guy who murdered his three children, who tried to beat his wife into an abortion so that he wouldn't have those kids. Person after person has stood up and testified to facts of this case that quite frankly you all aren't covering" and later replaced the chairman and other members of the Science Commission prior to a meeting on the case. The replacements were believed to potentially related to the election slated for the following year.

=== Infrastructure ===
In 2002, Perry proposed the Trans-Texas Corridor (TTC), a $175 billion transportation network that would include a 4,000-mile network of highways, rail, and utility lines and would be funded by private investors. Plans for the project were dropped in 2009 in favor of more incremental road projects. Opposition to the project, also called the "NAFTA super highway" garnered opposition from rural Texans, labor and environmentalists, the project became a major issue in the 2006 gubernatorial campaign.

=== Gun ownership ===
Perry has held a Concealed Carry License (CCL) and has signed a number of bills that increased CCL access.

=== Mexico border ===
In 2005, Perry launched Operation Linebacker, which was intended to prevent terrorists from exploiting the Texas-Mexico border. There was no evidence that terrorists attempted to exploit the border. Perry touted the border security efforts as he campaigned for re-election. During Perry's governorship, he launched additional operations and persuaded the Texas legislature to devote more taxpayers' resources to border security. According to a 2022 investigative report by the Texas Tribune, "The way the governors and their administrations have tracked success has fluctuated over the years, offering little clarity into whether the state is closer to securing the border today than it was nearly 20 years ago. Neither the governor's office nor the DPS, the main agency leading border security efforts, can provide a full breakdown of the state-led operations since 2005, their duration, their cost to taxpayers and their accomplishments."

During a large surge in illegal immigration through the U.S. southern border in the summer of 2014, Perry criticized U.S. President Barack Obama, saying the surge was "a humanitarian crisis that he has the ability to stop". On July 21, 2014, Perry announced he would send in 1,000 National Guard troops to secure the border. Although illegal immigration levels declined over 70% after Perry deployed the National Guard, PolitiFact.com rated his claim that the decline resulted from the surge as "mostly false".

In 2016, The Texas Tribune wrote that "Perry has long been a critic of building a wall or fence along the border." After Trump won the Republican presidential nomination in 2016, Perry fully embraced Trump's proposed border wall.

=== Veto controversy and exoneration ===
On August 15, 2014, Perry was indicted by a Travis County grand jury. The first charge of the indictment was abuse of official capacity, which has since been ruled unconstitutional, for threatening to veto $7.5 million in funding for the Public Integrity Unit, a state public corruption prosecutors department. The second charge, which has also since been ruled unconstitutional, was coercion of a public servant, for seeking the resignation of Travis County District Attorney Rosemary Lehmberg, a Democrat, after she was convicted of drunk driving and incarcerated.

Perry pleaded not guilty to both charges. Perry's supporters called the charges political and partisan, and several Democratic commentators, including David Axelrod, believed charges were weak.

In February 2016, Perry was cleared of all charges.

The Texas Court of Criminal Appeals ruled that courts could not limit veto power and that prosecuting Perry over his action violates "the separation of powers provision of the Texas Constitution" and infringed on Perry's First Amendment right to freedom of speech.

=== Retirement as governor ===
By the end of his third full term, he had served more than 14 consecutive years in office. A University of Texas at Austin–Texas Tribune poll released in June 2013, showed Perry leading potential primary challenger Attorney General Greg Abbott by double digits, 45–19%. In February, the same poll had Perry leading by a 3-to-1 margin (49–17%) of 32 points over Abbott.

However, Perry decided not to run for re-election to a fourth full term, announcing in front of family and supporters at the Holt Cat headquarters in San Antonio on July 8, 2013, that he would retire instead.

Perry retired with the 10th longest gubernatorial tenure in United States history at the end of his term on January 20, 2015, at 5,143 days as well as the record of the longest serving Texas governor.

== Presidential campaigns ==
=== 2012 ===
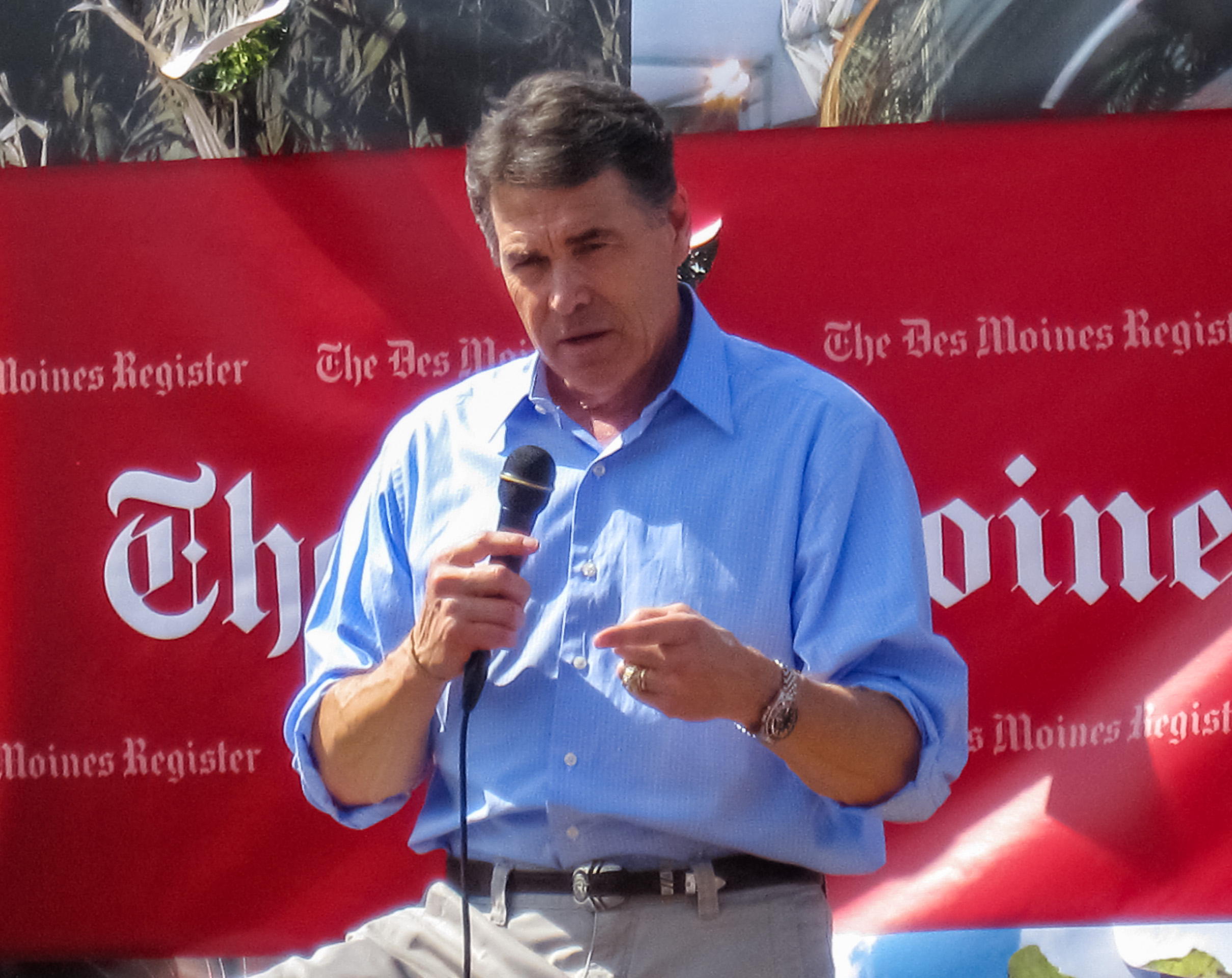
Perry campaigning at the Iowa State Fair, August 14, 2011

Perry was considered as a potential candidate since as early as the 2008 presidential election, initially denying he was interested in the office but later becoming more open-minded. He formally launched his campaign on August 13, 2011, in Charleston, South Carolina.

Perry was initially successful in fundraising and was briefly considered a serious contender for the nomination. However, Perry's performances in the GOP debates received generally poor reviews from the media. His botched attempt to criticize Mitt Romney as a flip-flopper in a debate held in Orlando, Florida was criticized in news coverage. Perry lost many conservatives' support when he defended the Texas policy of allowing in-state tuition for the children of illegal immigrants. He said during one debate that those who opposed financially supporting their education didn't "have a heart." After he mishandled a question about how he would respond to a "3am call" as president, Perry's advisers insisted that he get more sleep before the remaining debates.

At the November 9, 2011 Republican debate, Perry began a fiery statement about his platform, pledging to eliminate three government agencies as part of his policy to cut federal spending. After naming the Departments of Education and the Commerce, he was unable to remember the name of the third agency, eventually declaring "I can't. The third one, I can't. Sorry. Oops." A few minutes later, Perry said that the third agency he proposed to eliminate was the Department of Energy (he would later become the Secretary of Energy under the Trump administration). The Guardian called it "one of the most humiliating debate performances in recent US political history".

After finishing fifth with just over 10% of the vote in the Iowa caucuses on January 3, 2012, Perry considered dropping out of the presidential race but did not. After a poor showing in New Hampshire and with "lagging" poll numbers in South Carolina, Perry formally announced he was suspending his campaign on January 19, 2012. CNN later stated that Perry's 2012 campaign "was crushed by the weight of his debate gaffe and stump speech mishaps".

=== 2016 ===
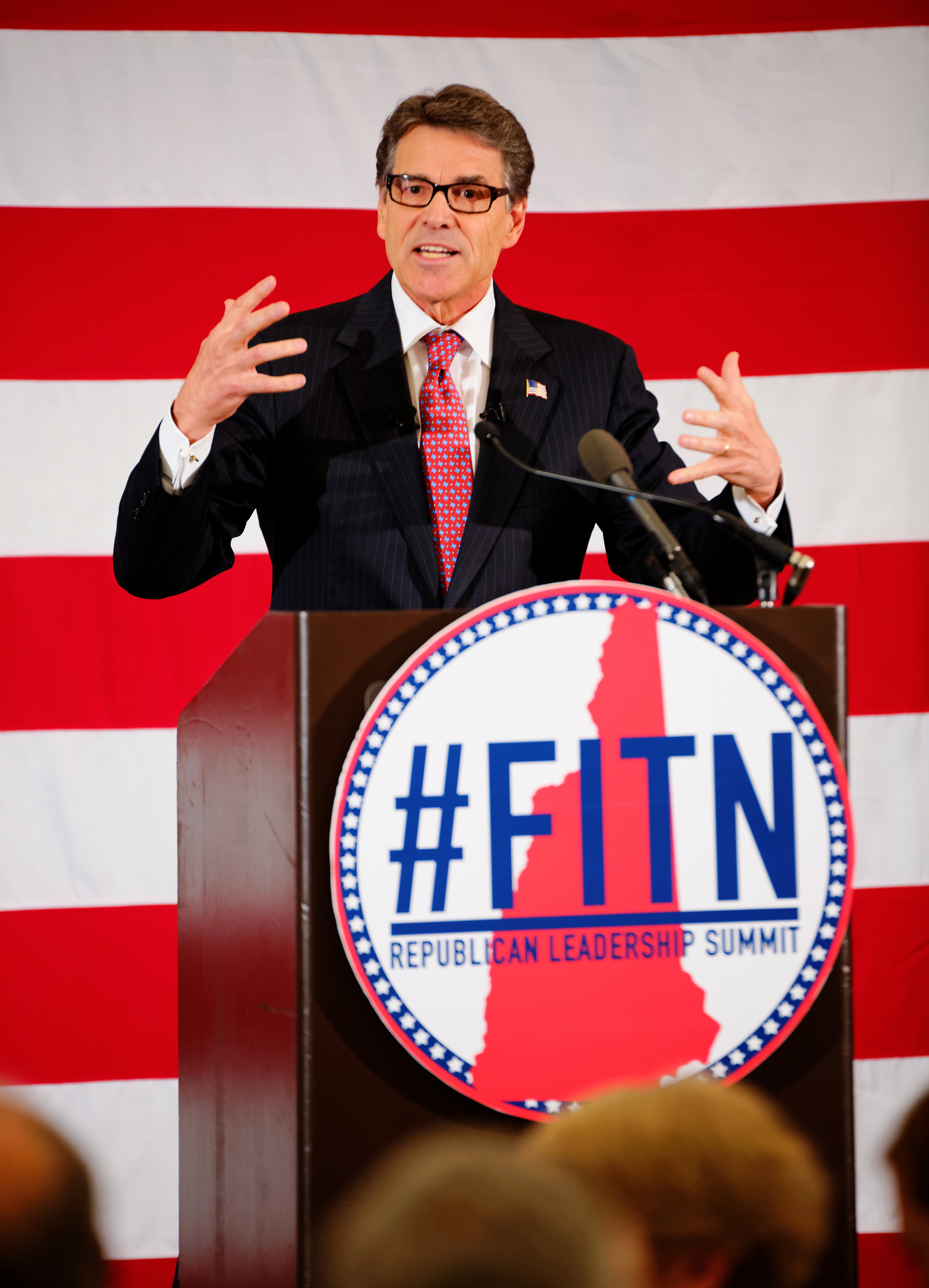
Perry speaking at 2015 First in the Nation Republican Leadership Summit in New Hampshire

Almost immediately following the 2012 election, Perry was mentioned as a potential candidate for the presidency in the 2016 presidential election. A July 2013 Time magazine article stated that "everything is aligned for Rick Perry to be the Republican nominee for president in 2016."

Perry officially launched his 2016 presidential candidacy on June 4, 2015, in Addison, Texas.

Perry withdrew his candidacy on September 11, 2015, following poor polling after the first debate. He became the first in the field of major candidates to drop out of the race. In the weeks before he dropped out of the race, Perry's campaign was in dire straits financially, having spent nearly four times as much as was raised.

On January 25, 2016, Perry endorsed United States Senator Ted Cruz (R-TX) for president. On May 5, 2016, following the suspension of Cruz's presidential campaign, Perry endorsed Donald Trump for the presidency.

== Secretary of Energy ==
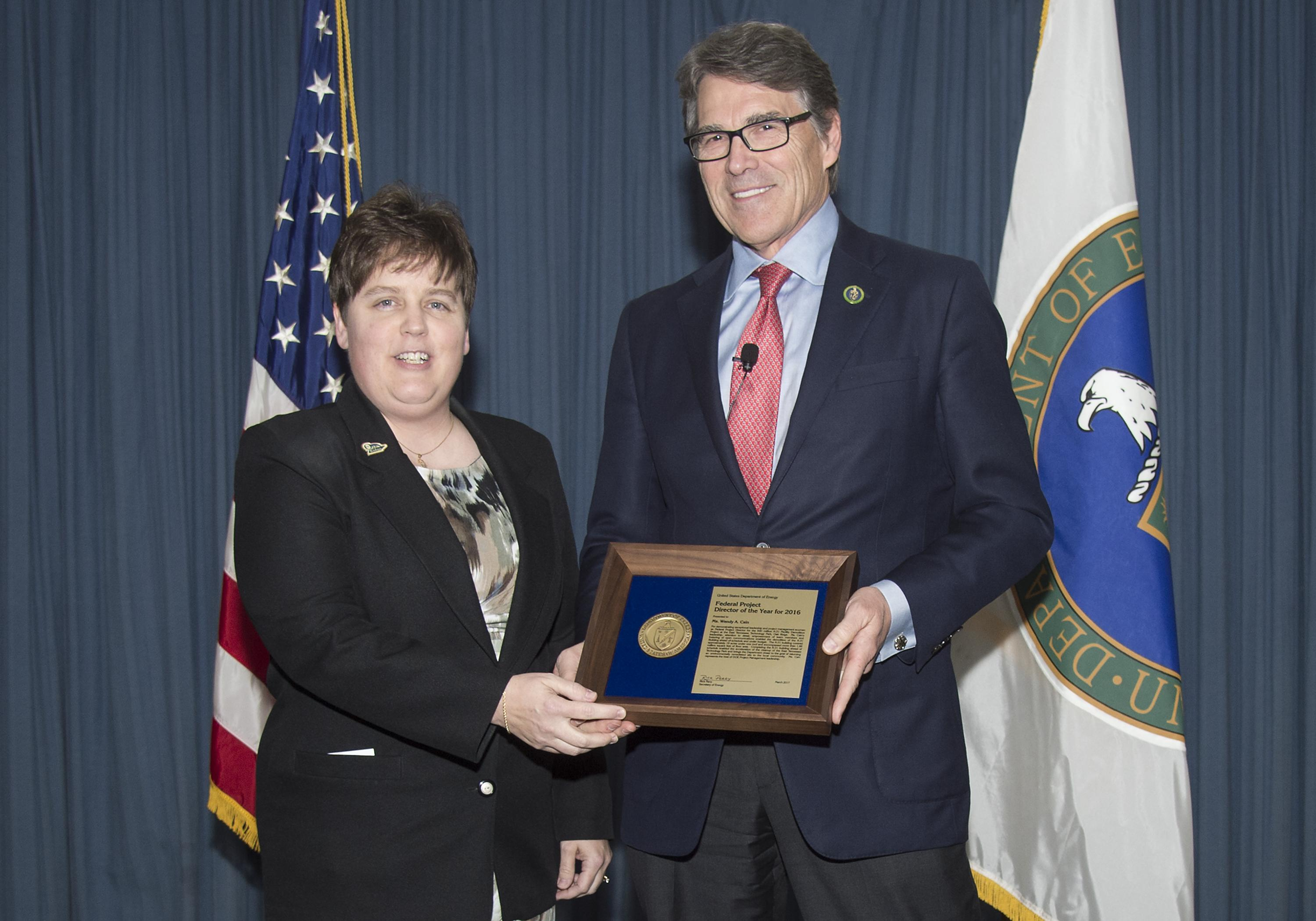
Perry at the 2017 Energy Project Management Awards on March 22, 2017

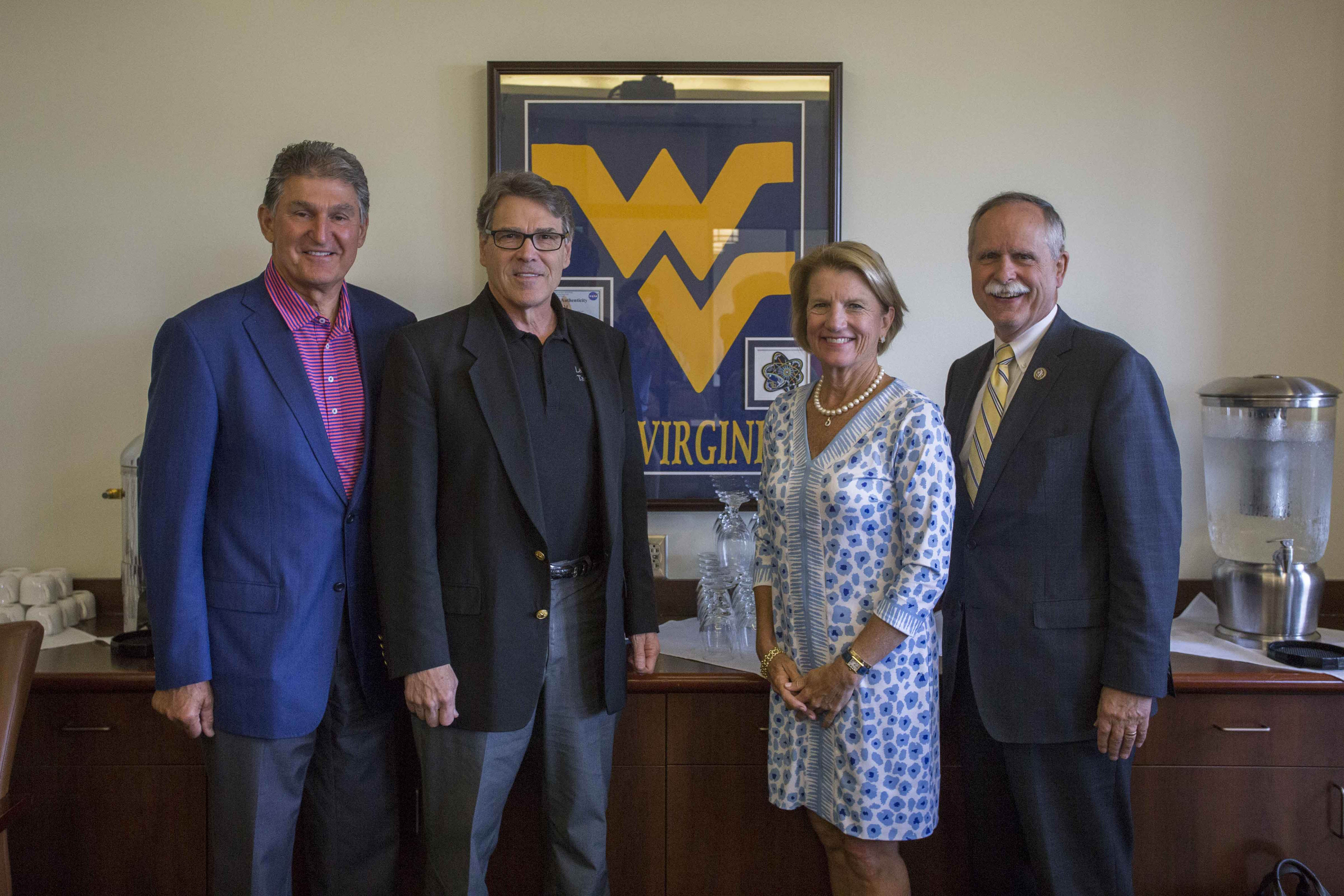
Perry with Joe Manchin, Shelley Moore Capito, and David McKinley in 2017

On December 14, 2016, President-elect Trump nominated Perry as Secretary of Energy. The nomination initially faced heavy criticism as Perry had called for the Department of Energy to be abolished during his 2012 presidential campaign and had been unable to remember the name of the department during a presidential debate. His nomination was approved by a 16–7 vote from the United States Senate Committee on Energy and Natural Resources on January 31, 2017.

On March 2, 2017, the United States Senate voted 62–37 to confirm Perry. The next month, Perry ordered a study of the U.S. electric grid with particular consideration to coal power. In January 2018, the Federal Energy Regulatory Commission unanimously rejected a proposal backed by Perry to subsidize coal and nuclear power plants that stored fuel on-site.

In a CNBC interview on June 19, 2017, when asked about the role of human activity in the recent rise of the Earth's temperature, Perry said, "The fact is this shouldn't be a debate about, 'Is the climate changing, is man having an effect on it?' Yeah, we are. The question should be just how much, and what are the policy changes that we need to make to effect that?"

In July 2017, Perry strongly expressed his support for Donald Trump's ban on transgender people from serving in the U.S. military stating that "The idea that the American people need to be paying for these types of operations to change your sex is not very wise from a standpoint of economics."

In November 2017, Perry suggested that using fossil fuels to light dangerous places in Africa could reduce sexual assault, saying, "When the lights are on, when you have light that shines the righteousness, if you will, on those types of acts." Perry was criticized by the Sierra Club for "exploiting the struggle of those most affected by climate change".

For one week in November 2018, it was reported that the U.S. had become a net exporter of oil, temporarily ending nearly 75 continuous years of dependence on foreign oil.

On October 4, 2019, the New York Times reported that he was expected to resign as Secretary of Energy by the end of 2019, based on information from anonymous sources. On October 17, 2019, Perry told Trump he would resign by the end of the year, ultimately departing at the beginning of December.

=== Trump–Ukraine scandal ===
A little more than a month after Perry attended Zelenskyy's May 2019 inauguration, Ukraine awarded the contract to Perry's supporters after Perry recommended one of them to be Zelenskyy's energy adviser. The recommendation was made as Zelenskyy was attempting to secure the nearly $400 million in U.S. military aid. A week after Perry attended the inauguration, "Ukrainian Energy", a new joint venture between Michael Bleyzer's investment firm SigmaBleyzer and Alex Cranberg's Aspect Energy, submitted a bid for a 50-year drilling contract at a Ukraine government-controlled site called Varvynska.

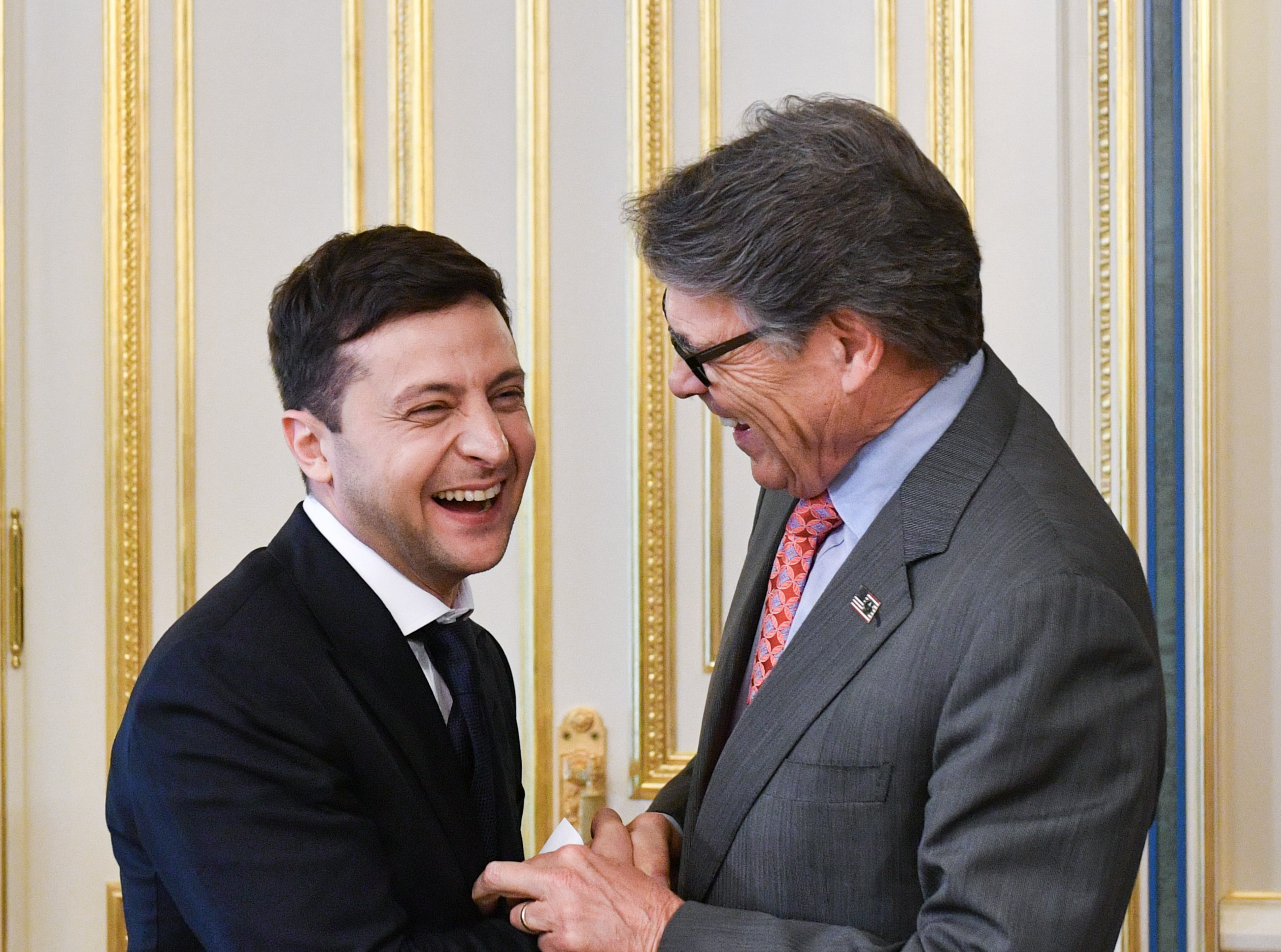
Perry and Zelenskyy at Zelenskyy's May 2019 inauguration

A July 25, 2019 telephone call between Trump and Ukrainian president Volodymyr Zelenskyy led in September to a whistleblower complaint and an impeachment inquiry against Trump. Two weeks after the inquiry was launched, Trump claimed in a conference call with Congressional Republican leaders that he had only made the telephone call at Perry's urging. Perry's spokesperson said that Perry had suggested Trump discuss energy security with Zelenskyy, but energy was not mentioned in the publicly released memo about the conversations, which instead focused on Trump asking Zelenskyy to launch investigations into Joe Biden, Hunter Biden, Crowdstrike, and the 2016 U.S. presidential election. Per Trump's direction earlier that year, Perry spoke with Rudy Giuliani about Ukraine, which Mick Mulvaney confirmed. Perry denied ever mentioning the Bidens in his discussions with Trump or Ukrainian officials. Mulvaney had put Gordon Sondland, Kurt Volker, and Perry in charge of managing the Ukraine–United States relations instead of diplomats at the National Security Council and the US Department of State.

Perry was mentioned in October 2019 by former U.S. officials in relation to reports he planned to have Amos Hochstein replaced as a member of the board at Naftogaz with someone aligned with Republican interests. Perry denied the reports. In November 2019, both Sondland and David Holmes, who serves as counselor of political affairs at the U.S. Embassy in Ukraine, testified that Perry had played a senior role in the Ukraine campaign, with Holmes even describing Perry, along with Sondland and Volker, was one of the "Three Amigos" who directly assisted both Trump and Giuliani.

== Career outside politics ==
In February 2015, Perry announced that he would join the board of directors of Energy Transfer Partners, which owns and operates one of the largest energy asset portfolios in the United States, and Sunoco Partners, another major Dallas energy company. According to SEC filings, Perry resigned from the boards of both companies on December 31, 2016. In early January 2020, Perry joined the board of LE GP, general partner of Energy Transfer. In February 2020, Perry rejoined MCNA Dental's board of directors as chief strategy officer and vice chairman.

On October 1, 2025, Perry, along with his son Griffin and conservative donor and investor Toby Neugebauer, launched Fermi America, a data center real estate investment trust, which planned to expand into nuclear energy. The company planned to build an 11-gigawatt energy and data center campus on a 5,236-acre site (2,119 ha) located outside Amarillo, Texas. In paperwork filed with regulators, the site is to be named the “Donald J. Trump Advanced Energy and Intelligence Campus”. Although the company had no announced customers, construction, or revenue, the IPO in October gave the company a market cap of $16 billion, with Perry's stake worth roughly $500 million. In 2019, Forbes had estimated Perry's net worth at $3 million. By April 2026, Fermi had not secured a major data-center tenant, and its shares had fallen substantially from their initial offering price. The company also announced a change in its executive leadership.

=== Dancing with the Stars ===
Perry was one of the celebrities competing on season 23 of Dancing with the Stars in 2016. He was partnered with professional dancer Emma Slater. Perry and Slater were eliminated on the third week of competition and finished in 12th place out of 13 competitors.

=== Ibogaine advocacy ===
Since consuming ibogaine at a clinic in Mexico in September 2023, Perry has become an outspoken advocate for the drug and psychedelic-assisted therapy, describing his public activities surrounding ibogaine as "[his] life's mission". To this end, he supported legislative efforts in Texas to fund clinical trials for treating military veterans with ibogaine, co-founded a non-profit organization that is focused on advancing ibogaine therapy in the United States, and has spoken publicly about his experiences with the drug. In 2025, Texas enacted legislation supporting a state-funded ibogaine clinical research program; the state allocated $50 million toward the trials. In March 2026, Texas officials announced that the program would proceed without the originally envisioned private drug-company partner.

== Bibliography ==
- On My Honor: Why the American Values of the Boy Scouts are Worth Fighting For (2008)
- Fed Up! Our Fight to Save America from Washington (2010)

== Personal life ==
Perry grew up in the United Methodist Church. He and his family were members of Tarrytown United Methodist Church in Austin until 2010, when they began attending Lake Hills Church, a non-denominational evangelical Christian megachurch in western Travis County. Perry told the Austin American-Statesman that he began attending Lake Hills because it was close to the rental home where he and his wife lived while the governor's mansion was being renovated. He was baptized in 2014.

In 1982, Perry married Mary Anita Thigpen, his childhood sweetheart whom he had known since elementary school. They have two adult children, Griffin and Sydney. Anita attended West Texas State University and earned a degree in nursing. She has spearheaded a number of health-related initiatives such as the Anita Thigpen Perry Endowment at the University of Texas Health Science Center at San Antonio, which focuses on nutrition, cardiovascular disease, health education, and early childhood development. She helped develop and host the Texas Conference for Women.

Perry played himself in minor roles for several feature films, including Man of the House, Deep in the Heart, and Hating Breitbart.

Perry is a member of the National Society of the Sons of the American Revolution and was awarded its Gold Good Citizenship Medal.

Perry has described his personal experiences with ibogaine and 5-MeO-DMT in Mexico in 2023.

== Electoral history ==
Texas gubernatorial election, 2002
Party	Candidate	Votes	%
Republican	Rick Perry (incumbent)	2,632,591	57.81
Democratic	Tony Sanchez	1,819,798	39.96
Libertarian	Jeff Daiell	66,720	1.47
Green	Rahul Mahajan	32,187	0.71
Independent	Elaine Eure Henderson (write-in)	1,715	0.04
Independent	Earl W. O'Neil (write-in)	976	0.02
Turnout		4,553,987	100.00

Texas gubernatorial election, 2006
Party	Candidate	Votes	%
Republican	Rick Perry (incumbent)	1,716,792	39.03
Democratic	Chris Bell	1,310,337	29.79
Independent	Carole Keeton Strayhorn	796,851	18.11
Independent	Richard "Kinky" Friedman	547,674	12.45
Libertarian	James Werner	26,749	0.61
Independent	James "Patriot" Dillon (Write-in)	713	0.02
Turnout		4,399,116	100.00

Texas gubernatorial election, 2010
Party	Candidate	Votes	%
Republican	Rick Perry (incumbent)	2,737,481	54.97
Democratic	Bill White	2,106,395	42.29
Libertarian	Kathie Glass	109,211	2.19
Green	Deb Shafto	19,516	0.39
Independent	Andy Barron (write-in)	7,267	0.14
Turnout		4,979,870	100.00

== See also ==
- Republican Party presidential candidates, 2016
- List of American politicians who switched parties in office
- Political positions of Rick Perry

Party political offices
Preceded by Bill Powers	Republican nominee for Agriculture Commissioner of Texas; 1990, 1994	Succeeded by Susan Combs
Preceded by Tex Lezar	Republican nominee for Lieutenant Governor of Texas; 1998	Succeeded by David Dewhurst
Preceded by George W. Bush	Republican nominee for Governor of Texas; 2002, 2006, 2010	Succeeded by Greg Abbott
Preceded by Sonny Perdue	Chair of the Republican Governors Association; 2007–2008	Succeeded by Mark Sanford
Preceded by Haley Barbour	Chair of the Republican Governors Association; 2010–2011	Succeeded by Bob McDonnell
Political offices
Preceded by Jim Hightower	Agriculture Commissioner of Texas; 1991–1999	Succeeded by Susan Combs
Preceded by Bob Bullock	Lieutenant Governor of Texas; 1999–2000	Succeeded by Bill Ratliff
Preceded by George W. Bush	Governor of Texas; 2000–2015	Succeeded by Greg Abbott
Preceded by Ernest Moniz	United States Secretary of Energy; 2017–2019	Succeeded by Dan Brouillette
U.S. order of precedence (ceremonial)
Preceded by Ben Carson as Former U.S. Cabinet Member	Order of precedence of the United States as Former U.S. Cabinet Member	Succeeded by Sonny Perdue as Former U.S. Cabinet Member
