= Rocky Mountain Pictures =

- Industry: Entertainment
- Founders: Ron Rodgers; Randy Slaughter
- Headquarters: Chicago, Illinois, United States
- Products: Motion pictures
- Website: www.rockymtnpictures.com

Rocky Mountain Pictures is an American film distributor. It was created by Ron Rodgers and Randy Slaughter. It was headquartered in Salt Lake City, Utah. It specialized in distributing conservative films. In 2016, the company was sold and moved to Chicago. Its focus changed to black, Latino and Asian-made indie films.

== Filmography ==
- Expelled: No Intelligence Allowed (2008)
- Standing Ovation (2010)
- 2016: Obama's America (2012)
- Hardflip (2012)
- Hating Breitbart (2012)
- Last Ounce of Courage (2012)
- Runaway Slave (2012)
- The Principle (2014)
- Grow House (2017)
