= C. L. Bryant =

American baptist minister (born 1956)

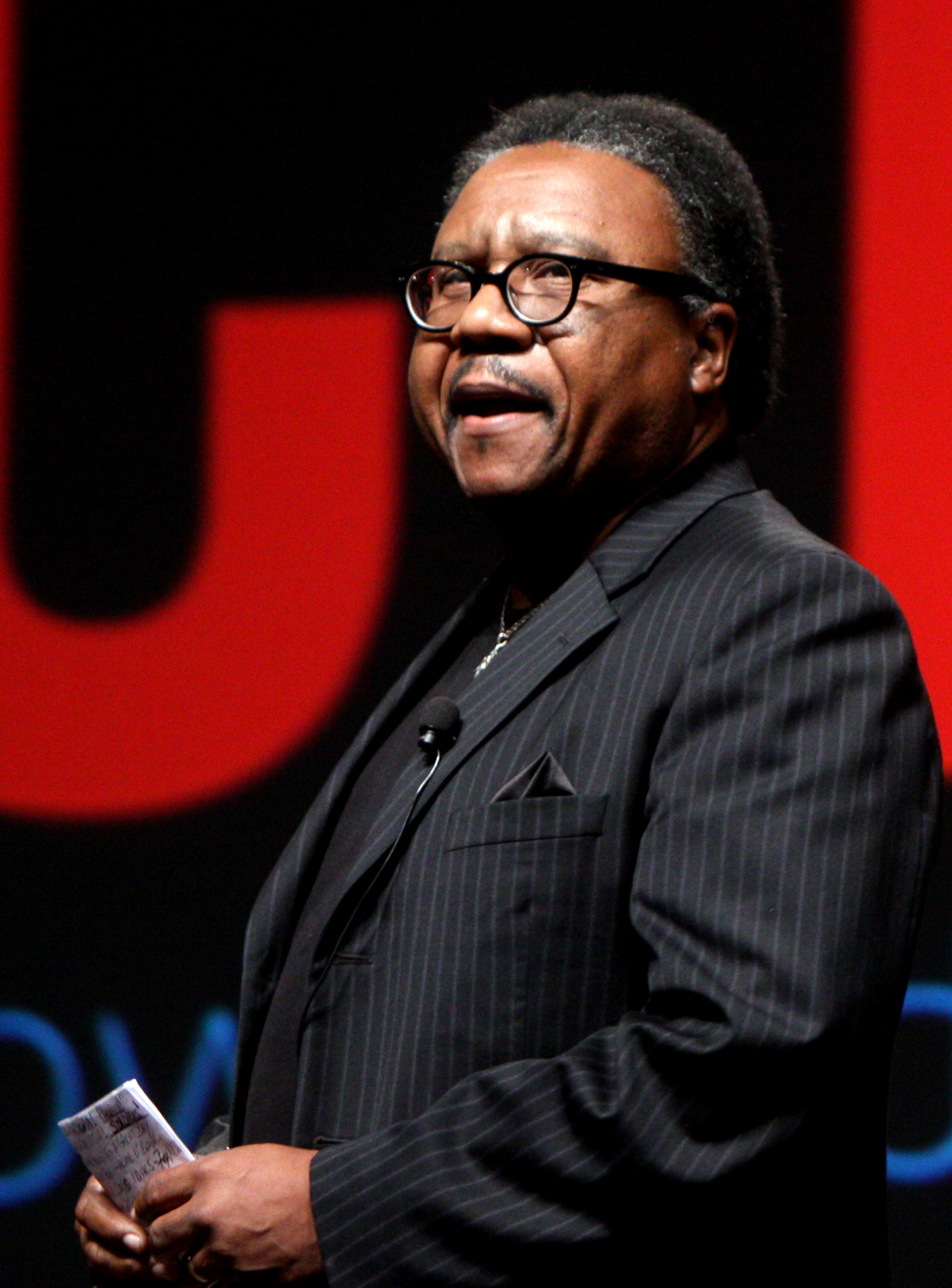
- Bryant in 2012
- Born: Cleon Lewis Bryant; March 28, 1956 (age 70); Shreveport, Louisiana
- Education: Fair Park High School; Louisiana State University in Shreveport (BA)
- Occupations: Clergyman; Former radio talk show host
- Political party: Republican
- Spouse: Jane Carline Pruitt
- Children: 4

Cleon Lewis Bryant (born March 28, 1956) is an American Baptist minister and former radio and television host based in Jensen Beach, Florida.

He is a senior fellow at FreedomWorks, a conservative advocacy group.

== Background ==
C.L. Bryant was born on March 28, 1956, to Lewis C. Bryant, a World War II veteran, and Elnola Goode, a native of De Soto Parish.

Bryant attended Louisiana State University in Shreveport, Bishop College in Texas and Tampa College in Tampa; the latter two of which are defunct. He received a master of theology degree from Shreveport Bible College and was ordained into the ministry by Reverend E. Edward Jones.

== Career ==
Bryant has spent nearly four decades in the ministry, including a missionary stint to the Amazon section of South America. He has also worked for twenty-five years in the field of finance. His current church affiliation is the inter-denominational Word of God Ministries in Shreveport with pastor James A. McMenis.

Bryant's radio program, The C. L. Bryant Show, aired from 2015 to 2017.

Bryant is a senior fellow at FreedomWorks in Washington, D.C., and a member of the Republican Party, which he has defended against allegations of racism.

In March 2012, Bryant criticized Jesse Jackson and Al Sharpton for their roles in protests stemming from the controversial killing of Trayvon Martin in Florida.

Bryant is the founder of "One Nation Back to God." In 2012, he produced and released the independent documentary, Runaway Slave. Bryant commented that the film was "a movie about the race to free the black community from the slavery of tyranny and progressive policies." In 2010, Bryant penned the non-fiction book, Lead Us to Temptation, Deliver Us to Evil.

On January 19, 2016, Bryant endorsed Senator Ted Cruz of Texas for the Republican presidential nomination. He then endorsed the eventual nominee and election winner, President Donald Trump and defended Trump against allegations raised by his critics on the radio program.

== Personal life ==
Bryant is married to the former Jane Carline Pruitt. They live in Grand Cane, Louisiana. The couple has four children and eleven grandchildren.

The couple formerly resided in Tampa, Florida.

== See also ==
- Black conservatism in the United States
