= Political positions of Rick Perry =

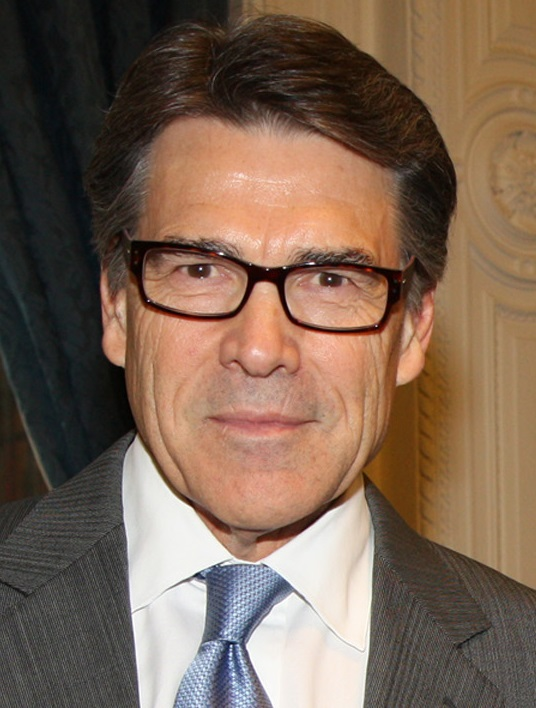
Governor Rick Perry in 2013

Rick Perry is an American politician who served as the 47th governor of Texas from 2000 to 2015. He was a candidate for the nomination of the Republican Party for President of the United States in 2012 and 2016, and served as the U.S. secretary of energy until December 1, 2019.

== Constitutional issues ==
Some of Perry's views are in opposition to Constitutional amendments already adopted. In his 2010 book Fed Up!, he takes issue with the Federal government's right to collect income tax, saying "if you want to know when Washington really got off the track, the 16th Amendment, giving them the opportunity to take your money with a personal income tax." He also criticizes the 17th Amendment, which allows for the direct election of U.S. Senators. According to Perry, the 16th and 17th Amendments caused states to "[hand] over significant chunks of their sovereignty and wealth to the federal government. Congress was free to tax and spend to its heart's content."

Perry has expressed support for amending the Constitution to set a nationwide policy on social issues, by prohibiting abortion and same-sex marriage. He also supports abolishing life tenure for judges, empowering Congress to overrule Supreme Court decisions by a two-thirds vote, requirement of a balanced budget, and placing a limit on federal expenditures.

== Criticism of Federal Reserve ==
On August 16, 2011, Perry sharply criticized the Federal Reserve, stating that it would be "almost treacherous – or treasonous in my opinion" to be "printing money to play politics". Many prominent Republicans criticized Perry for his statements. For instance, Tony Fratto, a Republican who had worked in the Treasury and White House under the Bush administration, described Perry's remarks as "inappropriate and unpresidential". Perry also suggested that if Chairman Ben Bernanke visited Texas, "we would treat him pretty ugly", a remark criticized by the White House as threatening.

Another of the top-three-polling Republican presidential candidates, Ron Paul, who routinely criticizes Bernanke and has made "End the Fed" a major platform issue, also criticized Perry's comment, saying that "he makes me look like a moderate" and that, unlike Perry, "I have never once said Bernanke has committed treason."

== Immigration ==
Perry is opposed to the DREAM Act.

Perry opposed the building of a Mexico – United States barrier. Perry says that the federal government should fulfill its responsibility to its citizens by securing the borders with "boots on the ground" and technology to improve safety while not harming trade with the state's biggest trading partner, Mexico. Perry said the Arizona immigration law, SB 1070, "would not be the right direction for Texas" and would distract law enforcement from fighting other crimes. He also opposes requirements that businesses use E-Verify to check the immigration status of prospective employees. He says that employment verification is needed but that the current E-verify system has flaws such as bad data which could be a hindrance to US citizens getting jobs as well as allowing as many as 50% of illegal immigrants through. Perry also wants to grant work visas to undocumented immigrants.

In response to the 2014 crisis of undocumented, unaccompanied children crossing the border, which generated widespread attention, Perry declared the issue of illegal immigration of minors a "side-issue" compared with the number of illegal immigrants arriving who have committed crimes, which he estimated was about 80%.

In 2016, The Texas Tribune wrote that "Perry has long been a critic of building a wall or fence along the border."

== Official language ==
In 2011, Perry said that he supports the English language to be official language of the United States.

== Death penalty ==
Perry supports the death penalty. In June 2001, he vetoed a ban on the execution of intellectually disabled inmates. In 2011, during a televised debate for presidential candidates, he said he had "never struggled" with the question of the possible innocence of any of the 234 inmates executed to date while he was governor.

== LGBT issues ==
Rick Perry opposes the legal recognition and legalization of same-sex marriage and civil unions, and supported the 2005 ballot proposition which amended the Texas constitution by defining marriage as "only a union between a man and a woman" and prohibiting the state from creating or recognizing "any legal status identical or similar to marriage". In 2011, after New York legalized same-sex marriage, Perry stated that it was their right to do so under the principle of states' rights delineated in the 10th Amendment. A spokesman later reiterated Perry's support for a federal constitutional amendment banning same-sex marriage, saying that position was not inconsistent since an amendment would require approval by three-fourths of the states.

In his first book, On My Honor, published in 2008, Perry drew a parallel between homosexuality and alcoholism, writing that he is "no expert on the 'nature versus nurture' debate," and that gays should simply choose abstinence. In 2002, Perry described the Texas same-sex anti-sodomy law as "appropriate". The United States Supreme Court's landmark civil rights decision in Lawrence v. Texas struck down the statute Perry referred to the following year for violating the 14th Amendment to the US Constitution.

During the 2012 presidential campaign, he criticized the repeal of the "don't ask, don't tell" policy for the U.S. military. In a 2011 campaign ad, he stated: "there's something wrong in this country when gays can serve openly in the military" and later defended the ad, saying he was "very comfortable" with it. Perry said using foreign aid as a policy tool against foreign countries that violate the human rights of homosexuals was "not in America's interests" and was part of a "war on traditional American values".

== Environmental and energy issues ==
Perry has been a denier of human contributions to climate change. In Perry's book, Fed Up!, he called climate science a "contrived phony mess." On August 17, 2011 at a breakfast with business leaders in New Hampshire Perry said that he does not believe the science behind global warming, saying that he thinks "there are a substantial number of scientists who have manipulated data so that they will have dollars rolling in to their projects". Perry has said that "Virtually every day another scientist leaves the global warming bandwagon ... But you won't read about that in the press because they have already invested in one side of the story." Perry's views have been criticized, with fact-checkers stating that surveys showed that more than 97% of climate scientists believed that global warming is anthropogenic and arguing that the ranks of dissenters don't appear to be swelling. On June 19, 2014 at lunch organized by the Christian Science Monitor Perry criticized the Obama administration's policies on climate change, including proposed regulation of greenhouse gases, saying "Calling CO2 a pollutant is doing a disservice the country... I'm not a scientist... I don't believe that we have the settled science by any sense of the imagination...". He said he was offended by being called a "denier." He said he supports the Keystone XL pipeline. In 2014, a spokesman for Perry cited "unsettled science" regarding climate change in partial explanation of Perry's opposition to the regulation of greenhouse gases.

Texas-based TXU had been planning a $10 billion investment in 11 new coal-fired power plants over the next several years, but drastically reduced those plans in 2007 under the terms of a buyout by a consortium of private equity firms. The Governor's Clean Coal Technology Council continues to explore ways to generate clean energy with coal. After the 2009 legislative session, Perry signed House Bill 469 which includes incentives for clean coal technology breakthroughs.

Perry opposes regulation of greenhouse gas emissions because he says it would have "devastating implications" for the Texas economy and energy industry. He has stated that he supports an "all of the above" energy strategy including oil, coal, nuclear, biofuels, hydroelectric, solar, and wind energy. Perry has collaborated with T. Boone Pickens, who has advocated reduced use of oil, primarily through replacing it with natural gas. Under Governor Perry, Texas sued the Obama administration to overturn Environmental Protection Agency regulations.

In 2011, temperatures in Texas set an all-time record for the hottest summer in the contiguous United States, with 91% of the state "experiencing extreme or exceptional drought". Perry said that comments by President Obama that linked the resulting wildfires to climate change were "outrageous".

Perry says the fossil fuel reserves in the United States are sufficient to meet current demand levels for the next 300 years. He supports current policies that may add a quarter million jobs by fracking the Marcellus Shale. However the report he based his comments on seems to have vastly overstated the case for America's gas reserves. As governor of Texas, Perry signed the first law in the nation to require drilling companies to disclose the chemicals used in the fracking process, in order to confront fears that the chemicals are leaking into water supplies.

In 2008, Perry pushed for federal loan guarantees for the expansion of the South Texas Nuclear Generating Station, but in 2011 he said that he had changed his position and no longer favored federal engagement in energy projects.

== Social Security ==
In Perry's book, Fed Up!, published in the fall of 2010, he said that Social Security was "a crumbling monument to the failure of the New Deal." He likened the program to "an illegal Ponzi scheme" and also suggested that it was unconstitutional, having been enacted "at the expense of respect for the Constitution and limited government." During the promotion of the book he said that the Federal government should leave health care to the states and focus on putting Social Security on "better and more solid footing".

In 2011, after he announced his candidacy for the presidency, a spokesman for Perry said that the book was written "as a review and critique of 50 years of federal excesses, not in any way as a 2012 campaign blueprint or manifesto". Later, Perry stated in a campaign appearance that he still believed the views in his book, and that he "[hadn't] backed off anything in [his] book." Perry has continued to sharply criticize Social Security, describing it as a "monstrous lie" and a "Ponzi Scheme". Perry's comments on Social Security have been criticized by many prominent Republicans, including former Vice President Dick Cheney, Republican strategist Karl Rove, and Republican presidential primary candidate Mitt Romney. Romney has released a detailed list of questions as to what would happen if Perry moved Social Security from the federal level over to the states.

During the campaign, Perry has suggested that changes in Social Security could include restricting eligibility on the basis of age and income, and a switch to private accounts.

== Foreign policy ==
While visiting Israel in August 2009, Perry gave an interview to the Jerusalem Post in which he affirmed his support for Israel from his religious background, "I'm a big believer that this country was given to the people of Israel a long time ago, by God, and that's ordained."

In 2011, he accused President Obama of a "policy of appeasement" for giving "equal standing to the grievances of Israelis and Palestinians" in peace talks.

Perry said, during the Republican debate in Orlando on Sept. 22, 2011, that the U.S. had chosen not to sell F-16 jet fighters to India; India made the decision to go with another military airplane. The Obama administration had lobbied for the sale. In that same debate, Perry also decried the Obama Administration's refusal to sell F-16C/Ds to Taiwan. Perry criticized Obama's policies in Iraq and Afghanistan, saying that the announcement of the scheduled withdrawal from Iraq by the end of 2011 has endangered American troops in the area.

Perry has also expressed support for an Israeli military strike on Iran's nuclear facilities.

In 2012, Perry argued against prosecuting American troops for violations of the Geneva Conventions.

In late 2011, Perry argued for the use of waterboarding as a method of obtaining information from suspects attempting to harm U.S. service personnel.

In August 2014, the Pentagon denied Perry's claims that Islamic terrorists were crossing the Texas border. The National Guard members Perry activated to face this "threat" were then directed to seek help from food banks while they waited to be paid for their service.

== Fiscal policy ==
In October 2011, Perry put forwards a flat tax proposal that would allow taxpayers to choose either their tax rate under existing law or a flat 20% rate. The plan would also eliminate taxes on Social Security benefits and inheritances. Asked if his tax plan would help wealthy taxpayers, Perry said he was not concerned about that because a lower tax rate would encourage greater investment and job creation by the wealthy.

As Governor of Texas, Perry received grades of B in 2004, B in 2006, B in 2008, B in 2010, C in 2012, and B in 2014 from the Cato Institute, a libertarian think tank, in their biennial Fiscal Policy Report Card on America's Governors.

== 2008 presidential endorsements ==
In October 2007, despite their political differences on many social issues, Perry endorsed Rudy Giuliani for President. "Rudy Giuliani is the most prepared individual of either party to be the next President... I'm not talking about any mayor, I'm talking about America's Mayor," Perry said. Some conjectured that, if Giuliani were elected, Perry might have been considered for a position in the new president's cabinet, or perhaps the vice presidency. Giuliani withdrew from the race on January 30, 2008, after failing to gain support in early primaries.

Both Giuliani and Perry immediately endorsed Arizona Senator John McCain for President. Shortly after Mitt Romney's withdrawal from the race in early February, Perry reportedly called McCain rival Mike Huckabee and suggested that he withdraw as well to clear the way for McCain to secure the nomination. Huckabee declined this request and made it clear publicly that he would abandon his presidential bid only if McCain secured enough delegates. Huckabee withdrew his presidential bid on March 5, 2008, after John McCain won the Texas and Ohio primaries.
