= Hating Breitbart =

2012 political documentary about Andrew Breitbart

- Directed by: Andrew Marcus
- Written by: Andrew Marcus
- Produced by: Maura Flynn; Gary Hewson; James Hoft; Evan Coyne Maloney
- Starring: Andrew Breitbart
- Edited by: Michael Kadela
- Music by: Chris Loesch
- Production companies: Pixel & Verse
- Distributed by: Rocky Mountain Pictures
- Release date: October 19, 2012
- Running time: 85 minutes
- Country: United States
- Language: English
- Box office: $81,432

Hating Breitbart is a 2012 political documentary about conservative media critic and alternative media icon Andrew Breitbart. The documentary was released on October 19, 2012, just seven months after Breitbart's sudden death.

The film was released by Rocky Mountain Pictures.

== Release ==
The film had a limited theatrical run on October 19, 2012, and received an early video-on-demand release on May 17, 2013.
