= Runaway Slave (film) =

- Theatrical poster
- Directed by: Pritchett Cotten
- Written by: Pritchett Cotten
- Produced by: Luke Livingston, Beverly Zaslow
- Edited by: Matthew Perdie; Pritchett Cotten
- Production company: Ground Floor Video
- Distributed by: Rocky Mountain Pictures
- Release dates: January 13, 2012 (Los Angeles premiere); July 27, 2012 (United States)
- Running time: 108 minutes
- Country: United States
- Language: English

Runaway Slave is an American independent political documentary hosted by Baptist minister C.L. Bryant, who hosts a nightly talk show over KEEL radio in his native Shreveport, Louisiana. The film premiered in Los Angeles on January 13, 2012. The film expresses Rev. Bryant's belief that the African-American community, "has traded one form of tyranny for another" by "buying into the entitlement mindset of Progressives."

The film, directed by Pritchett Cotten, is backed by the FreedomWorks Foundation.

== Premise ==
The film follows Rev. C.L. Bryant as he travels across the United States and speaks with members of the African-American community, various conservative leaders, and different public faces about the belief that the African-American community is immersed in a welfare state and prevented from being successful on their own. Andrew Breitbart, Glenn Beck, Herman Cain and Rep. Allen West are among the notable figures featured in the film who offer their insight and opinion into the topic.
