= Texas Conference for Women =

Women's leadership conference

- Formation: 2000
- Purpose: Women's personal & professional development conference
- Headquarters: Austin, Texas
- Official language: English
- Parent organization: The Conferences for Women
- Website: conferencesforwomen.org/tx

The Texas Conference for Women is a nonprofit, nonpartisan leadership conference for women of all ages and backgrounds. The first annual conference was held in 2000 in Austin, Texas as a one-day event consisting of keynote addresses and breakout sessions led by experts in the fields of business, philanthropy, health, finance, media and professional development. Programming is directed toward working women and touches on both professional and personal development. Attendees learn new communication skills, leadership strategies and work/life balance tools designed to enhance their professional and personal growth.

The breakout session format is "Power Talks", which according to the official site, is a 'fresh new high-impact format designed for how we live, learn and work today'. Unlike most conferences, which last 30–45 minutes, these talks are short by design (around 15-25 mins, with an audience Q&A).

In response to the COVID-19 pandemic in 2020 and 2021, the Conference moved to a virtual format. From 2022 on, the Conference has offered both an in-person event in Austin and an online event.

In 2025, the Conference moved to an all-new arena format at the Moody Center. The next conference will be held at the Moody Center on October 5, 2026.

== 2026 Speakers ==
- Kristen Bell
- Hoda Kotb
- Ilona Maher
- Tunde Oyeneyin
- Codie Sanchez

== Past speakers ==
- Yolanda Adams
- Chimamanda Ngozi Adichie, award-winning author
- Isabel Allende
- José Andrés, chef, humanitarian & founder, World Central Kitchen
- Maya Angelou
- Jennifer Arnold
- Martha Beck
- Jennifer Berman
- Laura Berman
- Bertice Berry
- Cherie Blair
- Lindy Boggs
- Barbara Bradley Baekgaard
- Nancy Brinker
- Douglas Brinkley
- Brené Brown, researcher & storyteller
- Neissa Brown Springmann
- Marcus Buckingham
- Jeri Callaway
- Katherine Center
- Jordan Chiles
- Johnnetta Cole
- Jody Conradt
- Kathleen Daelemans
- Charles Duhigg
- Sarah Ferguson
- Carly Fiorina
- Vonetta Flowers
- Nely Galán
- Melinda Gates
- Nancy Giles
- Selena Gomez, actor, producer, singer, philanthropist
- Glenda Hatchett
- Christy Haubegger
- Jessica Herrin
- Maria Hinojosa
- Karen Hughes
- Mae Jemison
- Tory Johnson
- Marion Jones
- Sarah Jones
- Doris Kearns Goodwin
- Nicole Kidman
- Geraldine Laybourne
- Nastia Liukin
- Marcus Luttrell
- Robert Malone
- Rose Mapendo
- Sara Martinez Tucker
- Cindy McCain
- Pat Mitchell
- Jeff Moseley
- Lisa Niemi Swayze
- Suze Orman
- Turk Pipkin
- Rend Rahim Francke
- Condoleezza Rice
- Ann Richards
- Mel Robbins
- Cokie Roberts
- Rebecca Roberts
- Bozoma Saint John
- Leslie Sanchez
- Ruth Simmons
- Melinda Spaulding
- Martha Stewart
- Helen Thomas
- Leigh Anne Tuohy
- Elizabeth Vargas
- Lori Vetters
- Andrea White
- Meg Whitman
- Mary Wilson
