= Crepori National Forest =

National forest in Brazil

- Floresta Nacional do Crepori
- IUCN category VI (protected area with sustainable use of natural resources)
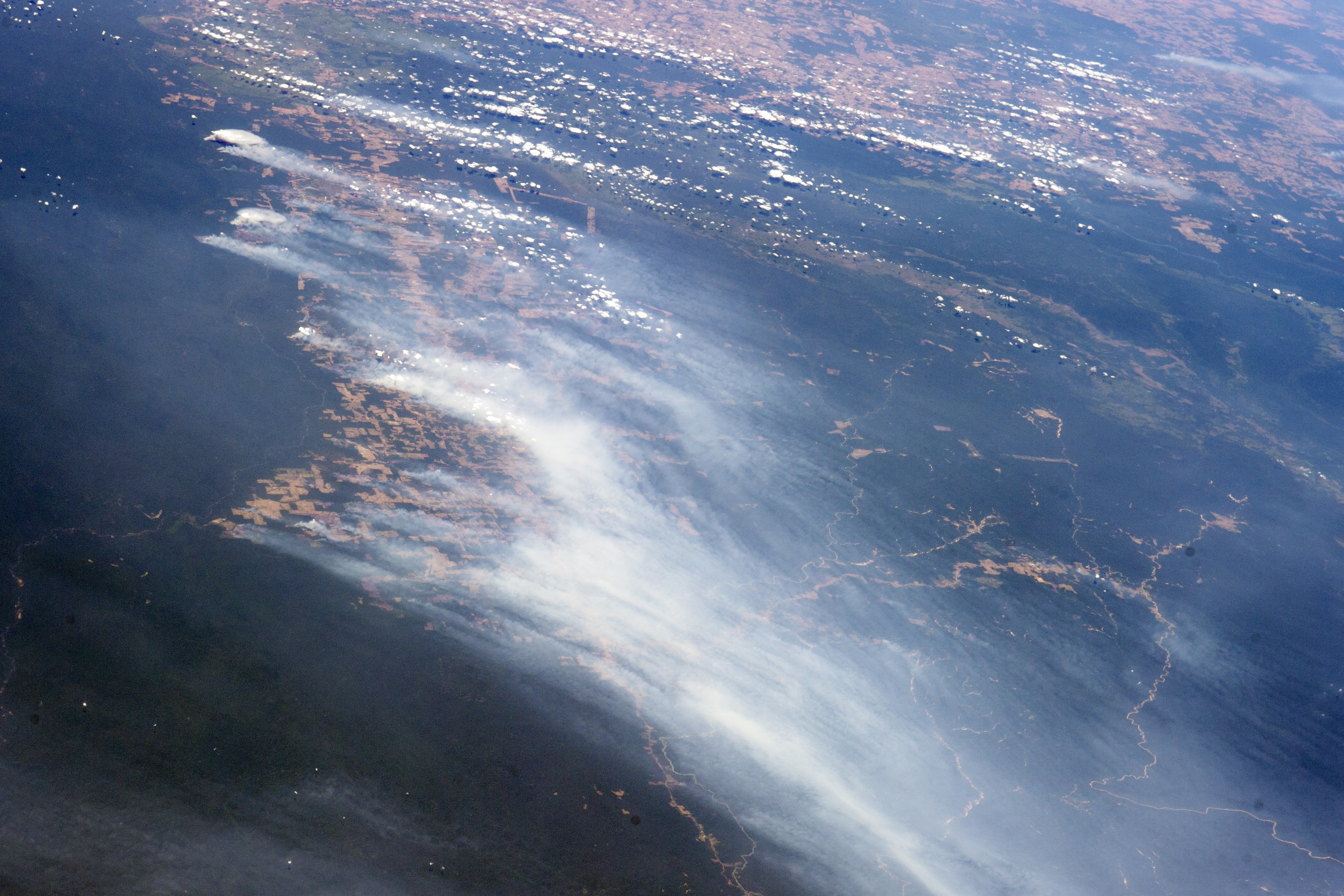
- Fires clearing land along BR-163 to the east of the forest. Looking south towards deforested areas of Mato Grosso. Crepori National Forest is in the lower right of the image.

- Location within Brazil
- Nearest city: Jacareacanga, Pará
- Coordinates: 6°30′00″S 57°00′07″W
- Area: 739,806 ha (2,856.41 sq mi)
- Designation: National forest
- Created: 13 February 2006
- Administrator: Chico Mendes Institute for Biodiversity Conservation

The Crepori National Forest (Portuguese: Floresta Nacional do Crepori) is a national forest in the state of Pará, Brazil. It is home to rich biodiversity including several endangered animal species.

== Location ==
Sketch map of the Tapjos. 15. Crepori National Forest

The Crepori National Forest is in the municipality of Jacareacanga, Pará. It has an area of 739,806 hectares (1,828,100 acres). It adjoins the Tapajós Environmental Protection Area to the north and east and the Mundurucu Indigenous Territory to the west. The northernmost part of the forest is in the Southern Pará Peripheral Depression, the central and eastern part in the Tapajós Residual Plateau and the southern and southwestern parts in the Amazon Lower Plateau domain. Altitudes range from 100 to 300 metres (330 to 980 ft).

The forest takes its name from the Crepori River, an important right tributary of the Tapajós, which rises in the Serra do Cachimbo at 450 metres (1,480 ft) on the border between the municipalities of Itaituba and Jacareacanga. The river's main tributaries are the Marupá River, a left tributary that enters the Crepori about 3 kilometres (1.9 mi) upstream from the settlement of Creporizão, the Creporizinho River, a right tributary that rises at 320 metres (1,050 ft) and the Piranhas River, a right tributary that rises at 335 metres (1,099 ft).

== History ==
The Crepori National Forest was created by federal decree on 13 February 2006 with the objectives of promoting sustainable multiple use of forest resources, maintenance and protection of water resources and biodiversity, and development of methods for sustainable exploitation of natural resources. Mining is allowed in specified areas. The park is administered by the Chico Mendes Institute for Biodiversity Conservation. It is classed as IUCN protected area category VI (protected area with sustainable use of natural resources).

The consultative council was created on 14 May 2009. On 17 November 2009 a working group was created to coordinate preparation of management tools for the Amaná, Crepori, Altamira, Jamanxim, Trairão, Itaituba I and Itaituba II national forests in the state of Pará. The management plan was approved on 10 March 2010.

Law 12678 of 25 June 2012 amended the limits of the Amazônia, Campos Amazônicos and Mapinguari national parks, the Itaituba I, Itaituba II and Crepori national forests and the Tapajós Environmental Protection Area. All were reduced in size except the Campos Amazônicos National Park. In the case of the Crepori National Forest, an area of about 856 hectares (2,120 acres) was excluded to allow for the Jatobá Hydroelectric Power Plant on the Tapajós river. The reduction was about 0.2% of the forest, from 740,661 to 739,806 hectares (1,830,210 to 1,828,100 acres).

== Environment ==
Temperatures range from 23 to 27 °C (73 to 81 °F) and average 25 °C (77 °F). Average annual rainfall is 2,500 millimetres (98 in). Soil types include red-yellow acrisols (40.77% of the area), yellow latosols (32.89%) and red-yellow latosols (18.38%.

Vegetation is about 88% dense rainforest and just over 11% open rainforest. The flora is highly diverse. A total of 231 taxa of species or morphospecies have been identified in 40 botanical families. The families with the most species were Orchidaceae (38), Araceae (34), Arecaceae (29), Rubiaceae (11), Marantaceae (10) and Bromeliaceae (9). These families account for 56.27% of all taxa recorded in the forest. Many of the taxa are widely distributed, but some are very restricted to specific environments. Rare species include the Bromeliaceae Fosteella batistana and an unnamed species of Arecaceae, both of which occur in alluvial forest. An unidentified species of Bromeliaceae of the genus Aechmea has been found in only one place in the forest.

The forest is home to species endemic to the Amazon basin such as the Amazon river dolphin (Inia geoffrensis) and tucuxi (Sotalia fluviatilis), and to the white-cheeked spider monkey (Ateles marginatus) and white-nosed saki (Chiropotes albinasus), primates whose presence in the Tapajós basin was not certain until their presence was reported in the forest. Bird species endemic to the forest include the dark-winged trumpeter (Psophia viridis), Gould's toucanet (Selenidera gouldii) and lettered aracari (Pteroglossus inscriptus).

== Sources ==
- Flona do Crepori (in Portuguese), ICMBio: Chico Mendes Institute for Biodiversity Conservation, archived from the original on 2018-04-14
- FLONA do Crepori (in Portuguese), ISA: Instituto Socioambiental
- PARNA dos Campos Amazônicos (in Portuguese), ISA: Instituto Socioambiental
- Unidade de Conservação: Floresta Nacional do Crepori (in Portuguese), MMA: Ministério do Meio Ambiente
