= Tapajós National Forest =

Area of Amazon rainforest

- Floresta Nacional do Tapajós
- IUCN category VI (protected area with sustainable use of natural resources)
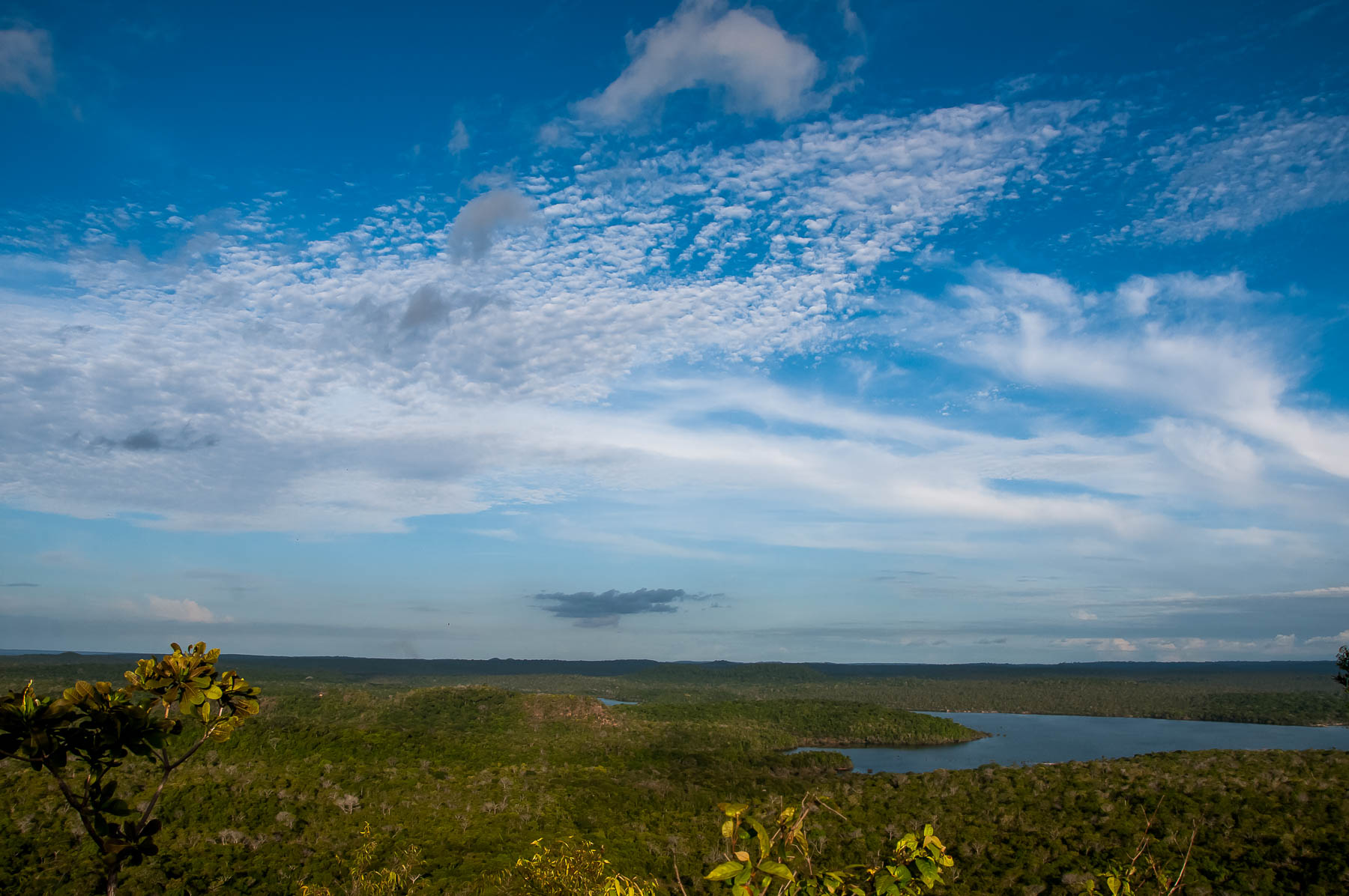
- Tapajós National Forest

- Location within Brazil
- Nearest city: Santarém, Pará
- Coordinates: 3°31′01″S 55°04′23″W
- Area: 549,066.87 hectares (1,356,773.8 acres)
- Designation: National forest
- Created: 19 February 1974
- Administrator: Chico Mendes Institute for Biodiversity Conservation

The Tapajós National Forest (Portuguese: Floresta Nacional do Tapajós) is a Brazilian national forest in the state of Pará, Brazil. It supports sustainable exploitation of the natural resources in an area of Amazon rainforest.

== Location ==
The Tapajós National Forest has an area of 549,066.87 hectares (1,356,773.8 acres). It is in the municipalities of Belterra, Aveiro, Rurópolis and Placas in the state of Pará.

The unit is bounded by the Tapajós, the Cupari River, a tributary of the Tapajós, and the BR-163 Santarém–Cuiabá road. Part of the forest drains into the Tapajós to the west, and part drains into the Curuá Una River basin to the east. The Moju River, a tributary of the Curuá-Una, rises in the forest. The side of the forest along the banks of the Tapajós has elevations of about 100 metres (330 ft) cut by ravines and deep valleys. The flat areas are periodically flooded in the rainy season. Further from the river the forest is on the Tapajós-Xingu plateau, with elevations of 120 to 170 metres (390 to 560 ft).

== Environment ==
The Tapajós National Forest is in the Amazon biome. Average annual rainfall is 1,820 millimetres (72 in). Temperatures range from 21 to 31 °C (70 to 88 °F) with an average of 26 °C (79 °F).

Forest coverage includes dense rainforest with emergent trees, alluvial rainforest flooded for part of the year, open tropical forest with palms a vines, and secondary forest along the borders and access routes. Species of trees include Aniba canelilla, Aspidosperma carapanaúba, Attalea maripa, Bertholletia excelsa (Brazil nut), Carapa guianensis, Ceiba pentandra, Copaifera Ducke, Cordia goeldiana, Coumarouma odorata, Dinizia excelsa, Genipa americana, Hura creptans, Inga disticla, Lecythis paraensis, Macrolopium campestre, Mauritia flexuosa, Mauritia flexuosa, Mezilaurus itauba, Minguarita guianensis, Nectandra amazonium, Oenocarpus bacaba, Orbignia martiana, Protium species, Spondia lutear, Vatairea paraensis and Xilopia species.

== Conservation ==
The Tapajós National Forest was created by decree 73.684 of 19 February 1974, modified by law 12.678 of 25 June 2012. It is administered by the Chico Mendes Institute for Biodiversity Conservation (ICMBio). It is classed as IUCN protected area category VI (protected area with sustainable use of natural resources). The objective is sustainable use of forest resources and scientific research, with emphasis on methods for sustainable exploitation of native forests. Protected species include white-bellied spider monkey (Ateles belzebuth), white-cheeked spider monkey (Ateles marginatus), giant anteater (Myrmecophaga tridactyla), jaguar (Panthera onca), giant armadillo (Priodontes maximus) and giant otter (Pteronura brasiliensis).

A Large Scale Biosphere-Atmosphere Experiment in Amazonia (LBA) project is quantifying the net ecosystem exchange of carbon dioxide and water in a primary Tapajós forest site, defining the net source or sink of CO_{2} from the undisturbed forest. This is an international research initiative by Harvard University and Brazil's National Institute for Space Research(INPE). It investigates the way in which changes in land use and climate will affect the chemical, biological, and physical functions of the Amazon region and the global climate.

The proposed South Amazon Ecological Corridor would link the national forest to other protected areas and indigenous territories in the region. The forest is in a region that contains 12 sustainable use conservation areas and 6 fully protected areas. The fully protected areas, which cover 6,670,422 hectares (16,482,970 acres), are the Amazônia, Jamanxim, Rio Novo and Serra do Pardo national parks, the Nascentes da Serra do Cachimbo Biological Reserve and the Terra do Meio Ecological Station. The sustainable use areas include the Tapajós environmental protection area and the Altamira, Amaná, Jamanxim, Trairão, Itaituba I, Itaituba II and Tapajós national forests, covering a total of 7,555,889 hectares (18,671,010 acres).

== Sources ==
- Ayres, José Márcio; Da Fonseca, Gustavo A. B.; Rylands, Anthony B.; Queiroz, Helder L.; Pinto, Luiz Paulo; Masterson, Donald; Cavalcanti, Roberto B. (2005), Os Corredores Ecológicos das Florestas Tropicais do Brasil (PDF) (in Portuguese), Sociedade Civil Mamirauá, archived from the original (PDF) on 2016-07-31
- Flona do Tapajós (in Portuguese), Chico Mendes Institute for Biodiversity Conservation, archived from the original on 2019-08-09
- Large Scale Biosphere-Atmosphere Experiment in Amazonia, Atmospheric Sciences, Harvard University, archived from the original on 2011-07-19
- Plano de Manejo da Floresta Nacional do Trairão, Localizada no Estado do Pará (PDF), Brasília – DF: ICMBio, archived from the original (PDF) on 2017-02-11
- Unidade de Conservação: Floresta Nacional do Tapajós (in Portuguese), MMA: Ministério do Meio Ambiente
