= Altamira National Forest =

Protected forest in Pará, Brazil

- Floresta Nacional Altamira
- IUCN category VI (protected area with sustainable use of natural resources)
- Location within Brazil
- Nearest city: Novo Progresso, Pará
- Coordinates: 6.026°S 55.132°W
- Area: 724,965.51 hectares (1,791,428.8 acres)
- Designation: National forest
- Created: 2 February 1998

Altamira National Forest (Portuguese: Floresta Nacional Altamira) is a national forest in the state of Pará, Brazil.

== Location ==
The Altamira National Forest is in the Amazon biome. It has an area of 724,965.51 hectares (1,791,428.8 acres). It covers parts of the municipalities of Altamira, Itaituba and Trairão in the state of Pará. The forest lies in the Amazon lowlands, with altitudes from 180 to 350 metres (590 to 1,150 ft). The forest spans the watershed between the Tapajós and the Xingu River. It contains part of the Curuaés River in the Xingu basin. The annual plan of 2009 authorized the grant of four forest management units totalling 380,000 hectares (940,000 acres), which were allocated to two companies with contracts expected to last 40 years and to create about 900 formal jobs, 80% of which would be local.

== Environment ==
Average annual rainfall is 2,800 millimetres (110 in). Temperatures range from 24 to 33 °C (75 to 91 °F) with an average of 27 °C (81 °F). Vegetation is mostly open rainforest with lianas, but also includes dense submontane rainforest and alluvial forest. Rapid ecological assessment studies found 212 species of flora in 145 genera. Endemic fish include Aspidoras poecilus, Microschemobrycon elongatus, Harttia dissidens and Hopliancistrus tricornis. Endemic primates include the white-cheeked spider monkey (Ateles marginatus) and the white marmoset (Mico leucippe).

== Conservation ==
The Altamira National Forest was created by decree nº 2.483 of 2 February 1998, and is administered by the Chico Mendes Institute for Biodiversity Conservation (ICMBio). It is classed as IUCN protected area category VI (protected area with sustainable use of natural resources) with the objective of sustainable multiple use of forest resources and scientific research, with emphasis on methods for sustainable exploitation of native forests. Protected species include the jaguar (Panthera onca), giant otter (Pteronura brasiliensis) and Amazonian manatee (Trichechus inunguis).

The ecological station is in a region that contains 12 sustainable use conservation areas and 6 fully protected areas. The fully protected areas, which cover 6,670,422 hectares (16,482,970 acres), are the Amazônia, Jamanxim, Rio Novo and Serra do Pardo national parks, the Nascentes da Serra do Cachimbo Biological Reserve and the Terra do Meio Ecological Station. The sustainable use areas include the Tapajós environmental protection area and the Altamira, Amaná, Jamanxim, Trairão, Itaituba I, Itaituba II and Tapajós national forests, covering a total of 7,555,889 hectares (18,671,010 acres).

== Sources ==
- Flona Altamira (in Portuguese), Chico Mendes Institute for Biodiversity Conservation, archived from the original on 2019-08-07
- Floresta Nacional de Altamira (PA) (in Portuguese), Serviço Florestal Brasileiro, archived from the original on 2016-08-07
- Plano de Manejo da Floresta Nacional do Trairão, Localizada no Estado do Pará (PDF), Brasília – DF: ICMBio, archived from the original (PDF) on 2017-02-11
- Unidade de Conservação: Floresta Nacional Altamira (in Portuguese), MMA: Ministério do Meio Ambiente
