= Itaituba I National Forest =

National forest in Brazil

- Floresta Nacional de Itaituba II
- IUCN category VI (protected area with sustainable use of natural resources)
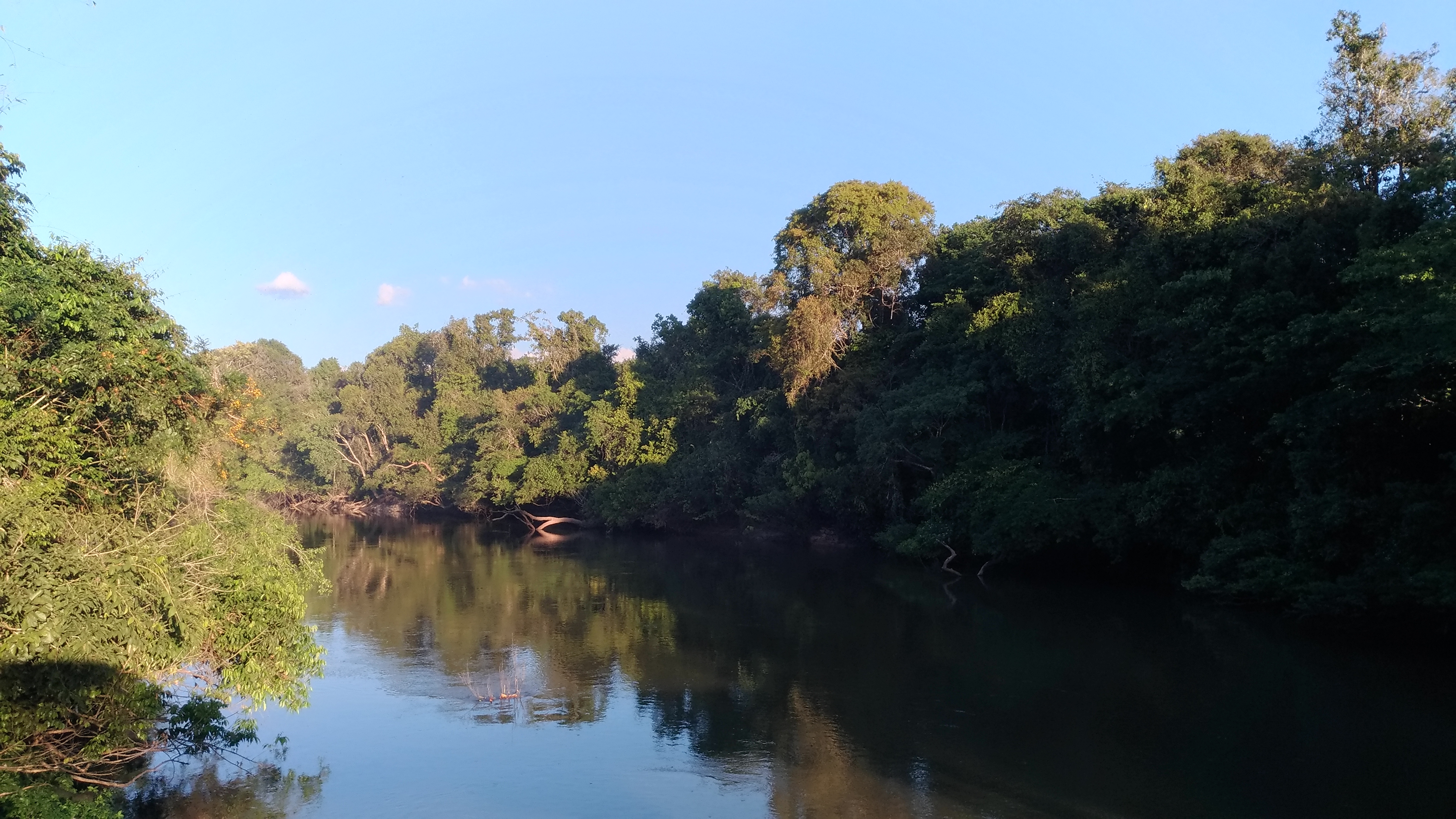

- Location within Brazil
- Nearest city: Itaituba, Pará
- Coordinates: 5.429°S 56.332°W
- Area: 220,639.44 hectares (545,211.9 acres)
- Designation: National forest
- Created: 2 February 1998
- Administrator: Chico Mendes Institute for Biodiversity Conservation

Itaituba I National Forest (Portuguese: Floresta Nacional de Itaituba I) is a national forest in the state of Pará, Brazil.

== Location ==
The Itaituba I National Forest is in the Amazon biome. It has an area of 220,639.44 hectares (545,211.9 acres). It covers parts of the municipalities of Itaituba and Trairão in the state of Pará. The forest is in the Tapajos residual plateau and in the Tapajos river basin, on the right bank of that river. The forest may be accessed by land via BR-163 and BR-230, the main federal highways in the region, or by boat via the Tapajós and Jamanxim rivers, and tributaries such as the Igarapé do Botica and the Ratão. There are some airstrips in and around the forest.

Tributaries of the Tapajos include the Cururu, das Tropas, Cupari and Jamanxim. The Jamanxim, which rises in the Serra do Cachimbo in the extreme south of the state, has fast-flowing passages and areas where it sprawls into backwaters, making travel by large boats difficult along most of its length. Its main tributaries are the Tocantins on the left bank and the Aruri on the right bank.

== Forestry ==
Of the forest's total area about 98.9% is occupied by natural forests. This includes 27.8% open submontane rainforest and 65.96% a mixture of dense and open submontane rainforest. The Itaituba I and Itaituba II National Forests together cover 610,471.73 hectares (1,508,508.5 acres). The management plan for the two forests defined a zone of sustainable forestry management of 432,628 hectares (1,069,050 acres), of which 295,000 hectares (730,000 acres) were allocated to three forestry concessions.

== Conservation ==
The Itaituba I National Forest was created by decree nº 2.481 of 2 February 1998. It is administered by the Chico Mendes Institute for Biodiversity Conservation (ICMBio). It is classed as IUCN protected area category VI (protected area with sustainable use of natural resources) with the objective of sustainable multiple use of forest resources and scientific research, with emphasis on methods for sustainable exploitation of native forests. Law 12678 of 25 June 2012 amended the limits of the Amazônia, Campos Amazônicos and Mapinguari national parks, the Itaituba I, Itaituba II and Crepori national forests and the Tapajós Environmental Protection Area. All were reduced in size except the Campos Amazônicos. Itaituba I was reduced by 7,705.34 hectares (19,040.3 acres).

The national forest is in a region that contains 12 sustainable use conservation areas and 6 fully protected areas. The fully protected areas, which cover 6,670,422 hectares (16,482,970 acres), are the Amazônia, Jamanxim, Rio Novo and Serra do Pardo national parks, the Nascentes da Serra do Cachimbo Biological Reserve and the Terra do Meio Ecological Station. The sustainable use areas include the Tapajós environmental protection area and the Altamira, Amaná, Jamanxim, Trairão, Itaituba I, Itaituba II and Tapajós national forests, covering a total of 7,555,889 hectares (18,671,010 acres).

== Sources ==
- Flona de Itaituba 1 (in Portuguese), Chico Mendes Institute for Biodiversity Conservation, archived from the original on 2019-08-08
- Florestas Nacionais de Itaituba I e II (PA) (in Portuguese), Serviço Florestal Brasileiro, archived from the original on 2016-04-02
- PARNA dos Campos Amazônicos (in Portuguese), ISA: Instituto Socioambiental
- Plano de Manejo da Floresta Nacional do Trairão, Localizada no Estado do Pará (PDF), Brasília – DF: ICMBio, archived from the original (PDF) on 2017-02-11
- Unidade de Conservação: Floresta Nacional de Itaituba I (in Portuguese), MMA: Ministério do Meio Ambiente
