= Jamanxim National Forest =

- Floresta Nacional do Jamanxim
- IUCN category VI (protected area with sustainable use of natural resources)
- Location within Brazil
- Nearest city: Novo Progresso, Pará
- Coordinates: 7.537°S 55.748°W
- Area: 1,301,683.04 hectares (3,216,528.8 acres)
- Designation: National forest
- Created: 13 February 2006
- Administrator: Chico Mendes Institute for Biodiversity Conservation

The Jamanxim National Forest (Portuguese: Floresta Nacional do Jamanxim) is a national forest created in 2006 in the state of Pará, Brazil. The purpose is to ensure sustainable use of forest resources. The forest contains a sizeable population of settlers without land titles, and informal forest clearing and burning was continuing two years after the national forest had been created. Disputes over the legality of the forest creation were continuing in 2015.

== Location ==
The Jamanxim National Forest is in the Amazon biome. It has an area of 1,301,683.04 hectares (3,216,528.8 acres). It was created by decree on 13 February 2006 and is administered by the Chico Mendes Institute for Biodiversity Conservation (ICMBio). It is contained in the municipality of Novo Progresso in the state of Pará. The forest consists of about 85% open rainforest and 14% dense rainforest. It was created in the context of land planning in the area influenced by the BR-163 highway, with the objective of slowing deforestation in one of the areas with the highest rates of Amazon forest clearance. The Jamanxim National Forest is classed as IUCN protected area category VI (protected area with sustainable use of natural resources) with the objective of sustainable multiple use of forest resources, maintenance and protection of water resources and biodiversity, and supporting sustainable exploitation of natural resources.

== Disputes ==
Almost 1,000 families had been encouraged by the government to move to the area in the 1970s, but had not been given any land title and therefore were not entitled to compensation. In August 2009 senator Flexa Ribeiro said that under a draft agreement between ICMBio and the inhabitants of the national forest there would be no fines for deforestation before November 2007. In 2009 deforestation and burning was continuing at a rapid rate in previously untouched areas. That year the forest lost 60 square kilometres (23 sq mi) of coverage, with 18.8 square kilometres (7.3 sq mi) removed in June 2009 alone. About 12% of the forest area had been cleared, with about half the land abandoned rather than converted to agricultural use. IBAMA had arranged for the National Supply Company (Conab) to remove 6,000 head of cattle from the forest, and another 15,000 were to be removed. Weapons, chainsaws, fuel, tractors and other equipment had also been seized by IBAMA.

Proposals to reduce the size of the forest have been made by local companies and state politicians. Some parts of the national forest are heavily populated, with pineapple plantations and farms growing crops and raising pigs, chickens and cattle. Representatives of the settlers challenged the legality of the creation of the national forest, on the grounds that the law called for participation of local people in creation, deployment and management of conservation units through preliminary technical studies and public consultations. ICMBio had proposed allocating 250,000 hectares (620,000 acres) to the settlers, but the farmers associations wanted 415,000 hectares (1,030,000 acres). The dispute was ongoing in February 2015 after failure of negotiations before the Brazilian general election of October 2014. In July 2015 ICMBio reported that it had seized 850 recently felled logs detected by the Real Time Deforestation Detection System (DETER) of the National Institute for Space Research (INPE).

== Regional conservation ==
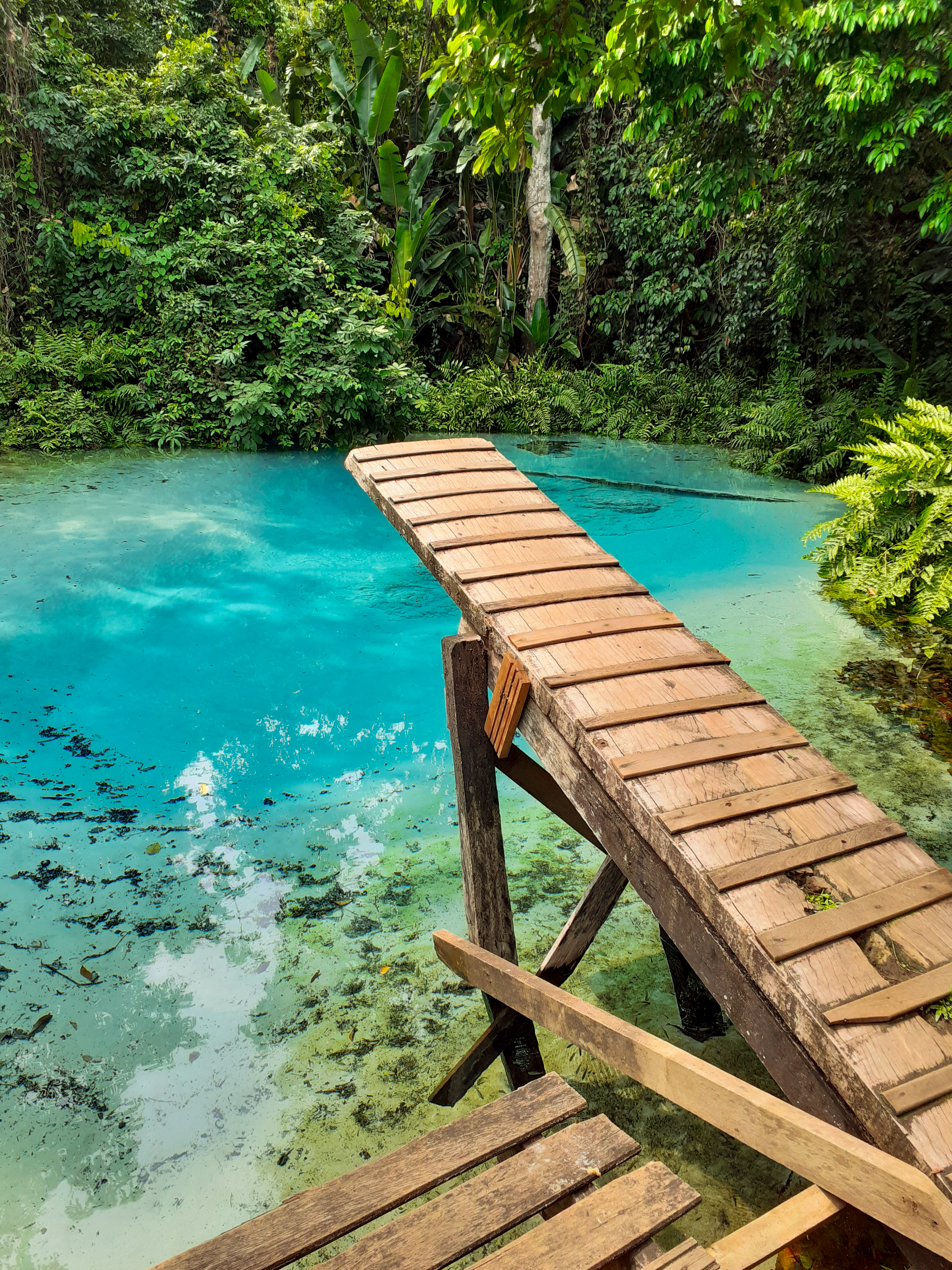
Natural Amazonian Boiler

The national forest is in a region that contains 12 sustainable use conservation areas and 6 fully protected areas. The fully protected areas, which cover 6,670,422 hectares (16,482,970 acres), are the Amazônia, Jamanxim, Rio Novo and Serra do Pardo national parks, the Nascentes da Serra do Cachimbo Biological Reserve and the Terra do Meio Ecological Station. The sustainable use areas include the Tapajós environmental protection area and the Altamira, Amaná, Jamanxim, Trairão, Itaituba I, Itaituba II and Tapajós national forests, covering a total of 7,555,889 hectares (18,671,010 acres).

== Sources ==
- Andreia Fanzeres (20 August 2009), "Um outro desfecho para Jamanxim", O Eco (in Portuguese)
- "Delimitação da Flona Jamanxim, cada dia mais difícil", Folha do Progresso (in Portuguese), 11 February 2015
- Flona do Jamanxim (in Portuguese), Chico Mendes Institute for Biodiversity Conservation, archived from the original on 2016-08-16
- FLONA do Jamanxim (in Portuguese), ISA: Instituto Socioambiental
- Floresta Nacional do Jamanxim (in Portuguese), MMA: Ministério do Meio Ambiente, archived from the original on 2013-11-16
- ICMBio (15 July 2015), Realizada fiscalizacao na Floresta Nacional do Jamanxim (in Portuguese), ISA: Instituto Socioambiental
- Plano de Manejo da Floresta Nacional do Trairão, Localizada no Estado do Pará (PDF), Brasília – DF: ICMBio, archived from the original (PDF) on 2017-02-11
