= Amaná National Forest =

National forest in Brazil

- Floresta Nacional do Amaná
- IUCN category VI (protected area with sustainable use of natural resources)
- Location within Brazil
- Nearest city: Jacareacanga, Pará
- Coordinates: 5.316°S 57.485°W
- Area: 539,571.39 hectares (1,333,309.9 acres)
- Designation: National forest
- Created: 13 February 2006
- Administrator: Chico Mendes Institute for Biodiversity Conservation

Amaná National Forest (Portuguese: Floresta Nacional do Amaná) is a national forest in the state of Pará, Brazil. Most of it has been allocated for use in sustainable forestry or community forestry. Mining is allowed.

== Location ==
The Amaná National Forest is in the Amazon biome. It was created by decree on 13 February 2006 and is administered by the Chico Mendes Institute for Biodiversity Conservation (ICMBio). It has an area of 539,571.39 hectares (1,333,309.9 acres). (Note: According to the management plan, the forest has an area of 540,417.17 hectares (1,335,399.9 acres).) It covers parts of the municipalities of Jacareacanga and Itaituba in the state of Pará. The forest is in the south west of the state of Pará along the border with the state of Amazonas, between the Madeira River and the Tapajós. To the west it adjoins the 538,081 hectares (1,329,630 acres) Urupadi National Forest in Amazonas, a sustainable use conservation unit created in 2016.

== Usage ==
The Amaná National Forest is classed as IUCN protected area category VI (protected area with sustainable use of natural resources) with the objective of sustainable multiple use of forest resources, maintenance and protection of water resources and biodiversity, and supporting sustainable exploitation of natural resources. Mining is allowed in the forest following the provisions of its management plan. The management plan defined six land usage zones, as follows:

Zone	Area (ha)	% of Forest
Community forest management	54,926	10.2%
Sustainable forest management	364,449	67.4%
Preservation	34,967	6.5%
Primitive	77.206	14.3%
Conflicting use	8,461	1.6%
Special use	401	0.1%
Total	540,411	100.00%

The 2009 annual plan authorized the grant of five forestry units totalling 210,000 hectares (520,000 acres).

== Regional conservation ==
The national forest was created as part of the planning process for land management and environment protection along the BR-163 trans-Amazon highway. It is in a region that contains 12 sustainable use conservation areas and 6 fully protected areas. The fully protected areas, which cover 6,670,422 hectares (16,482,970 acres), are the Amazônia, Jamanxim, Rio Novo and Serra do Pardo national parks, the Nascentes da Serra do Cachimbo Biological Reserve and the Terra do Meio Ecological Station. The sustainable use areas include the Tapajós environmental protection area and the Altamira, Amaná, Jamanxim, Trairão, Itaituba I, Itaituba II and Tapajós national forests, covering a total of 7,555,889 hectares (18,671,010 acres).

== Sources ==
- Anexo 2 - Caracterização das UMF (in Portuguese), Serviço Florestal Brasileiro, 2013
- FLONA de Urupadi (in Portuguese), ISA: Instituto Socioaambiental
- Floresta Nacional do Amana (in Portuguese), Chico Mendes Institute for Biodiversity Conservation, archived from the original on 2016-08-16
- Floresta Nacional do Amana (PA) - Primeira licitação (in Portuguese), Serviço Florestal Brasileiro, archived from the original on 2016-08-07
- Plano de Manejo da Floresta Nacional do Trairão, Localizada no Estado do Pará (PDF), Brasília – DF: ICMBio, archived from the original (PDF) on 2017-02-11
- Unidade de Conservação: Floresta Nacional do Amaná (in Portuguese), MMA: Ministério do Meio Ambiente
