= Tapajós Environmental Protection Area =

Environmental protection area in Brazil

- Área de Proteção Ambiental do Tapajós
- IUCN category V (protected landscape/seascape)
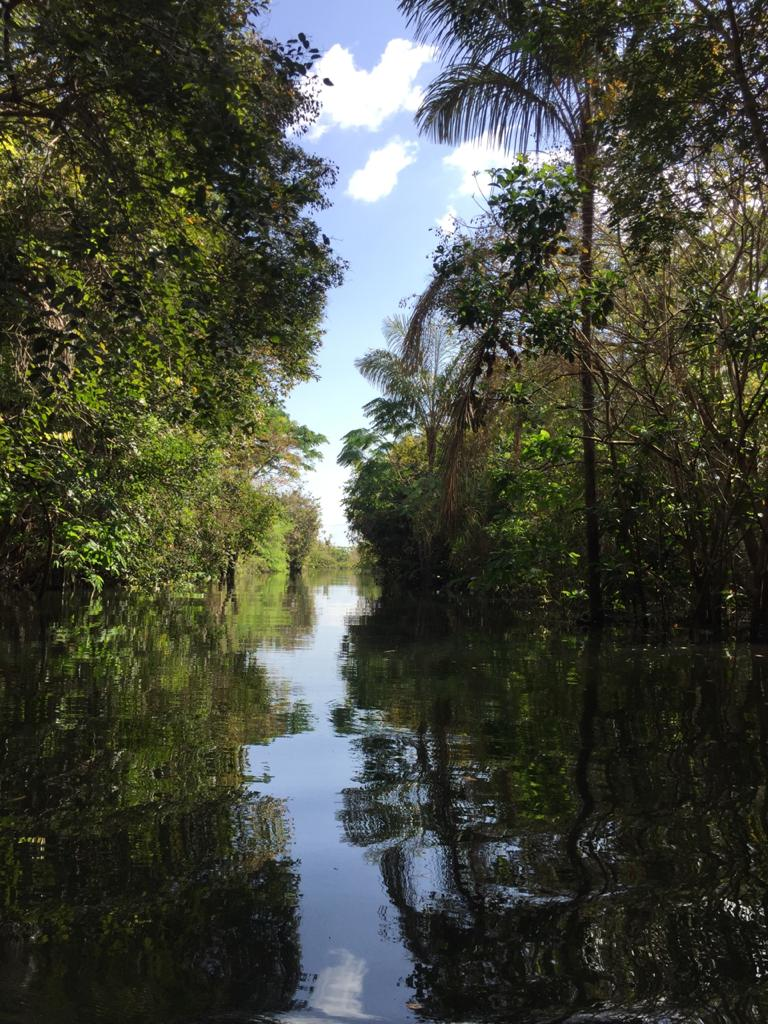

- Location within Brazil
- Nearest city: Itaituba, Pará
- Coordinates: 6°30′47″S 56°42′48″W
- Area: 1,988,445 ha (7,677.43 sq mi)
- Designation: Environmental protection area
- Created: 13 February 2006
- Administrator: ICMBio

The Tapajós Environmental Protection Area (Portuguese: Área de Proteção Ambiental do Tapajós) is an environmental protection area in the state of Pará, Brazil.

== Location ==
The Tapajós Environmental Protection Area (APA) is divided between the municipalities of Trairão (0.27%), Jacareacanga (14.12%) and Itaituba (85.61%) in the state of Pará. It has an area of 1,988,445 hectares (4,913,550 acres). The Tapajós APA is in the western portion of the BR-163 Sustainable Forest District. The Transgarimpeira Road runs through the APA from east to west, and provides the easiest access.

The terrain is hilly, with deep valleys formed by erosion and inselbergs. Altitudes range from 36 to 474 metres (118 to 1,555 ft). The APA is in the Jamanxim sub-basin of the Tapajós basin. The main rivers in the APA are the Tapajós, Jamanxim, Crepori and Novo.

== History ==
The Tapajós Environmental Protection Area (APA) was created by federal decree on 13 February 2006 with the basic objectives of protecting biological diversity, controlling occupation and ensuring sustainable use of natural resources. The APA was created to relieve unemployment and social tension caused by tighter controls on illegal logging in the municipality of Novo Progresso and the district of Moraes de Almeida. This could be partly solved by opening timber concessions in the APA. Ordinance 108 of 23 December 2011 created the consultative council to help create and implement the management plan. The APA is administered by the Chico Mendes Institute for Biodiversity Conservation (ICMBio). It is classed IUCN protected area category V (protected landscape/seascape).

Provisional measure 558 of 5 January 2012 changed the boundaries of the Mapinguari, Amazônia and Campos Amazônicos national parks, Itaituba I, Itaituba II and Crepori national forests and the Tapajós APA. All were reduced in size apart from the Campos Amazônicos park. An area of about 19,915 hectares (49,210 acres) was removed from the Tapajós APA due to the planned Jatobá Hydroelectric Power Plant on the Tapajós river. The measure affected about 0.96% of the APA, which was reduced from 2,059,496 to 2,039,581 hectares (5,089,130 to 5,039,910 acres). Law 12678 of 25 June 2012 confirmed provisional measure 558.

Provisional measure 758 of 19 December 2016 altered the limits of the Tapajós APA and the Jamanxim National Park. It remove two polygons of 334 hectares (830 acres) and 528 hectares (1,300 acres), and elsewhere expanded the park by 51,135 hectares (126,360 acres). The areas removed were to be used for the beds and verges of the EF-170 railway and BR-163 highway. Land that was not actually used would be reintegrated into the national park. The area of the APA dropped from 2,039,581 to 1,997,628 hectares (5,039,910 to 4,936,250 acres), while the area of the national park grew from 859,700 to 909,970 hectares (2,124,400 to 2,248,600 acres).

== Environment ==
Average annual rainfall is 2,250 millimetres (89 in). Temperatures range from 21 to 34 °C (70 to 93 °F) with an average of 27 °C (81 °F). Soils are mainly red yellow acrisols.

Vegetation includes dense rainforest (74%), open rainforest (24%) and cerrado-forest contact (2%). Almost 93% of the area is covered by rainforest, with 213 species of trees, 2 of lianas and 8 of palm trees. Andiroba (Carapa guianensis) and Brazil nut (Bertholletia excelsa) are the most common. A number of common species have economic value including Muiratinga, Breu-manga, Breu-vermelho, Louro-jandauba and Abiurana-vermelha in the dense rainforest and Breu manga, Muiratinga, Abiurana vermelha, Macucu and Embauba in the open rainforest. In the open rainforest with creepers valuable trees include Louro-jandauba, Caripe-banco, Breu-vermelho, Acariquara and Muiratinga.

== Sources ==
- APA do Tapajós (in Portuguese), ICMBio: Instituto Chico Mendes de Conservação da Biodiversidade
- APA do Tapajós (in Portuguese), ISA: Instituto Socioambiental
- APA Tapajós (in Portuguese), Via Rural, archived from the original on February 13, 2017
- Unidade de Conservação: Área de Proteção Ambiental do Tapajós (in Portuguese), MMA: Ministério do Meio Ambiente
