= Itaituba II National Forest =

National forest in Brazil

- Floresta Nacional de Itaituba II
- IUCN category VI (protected area with sustainable use of natural resources)
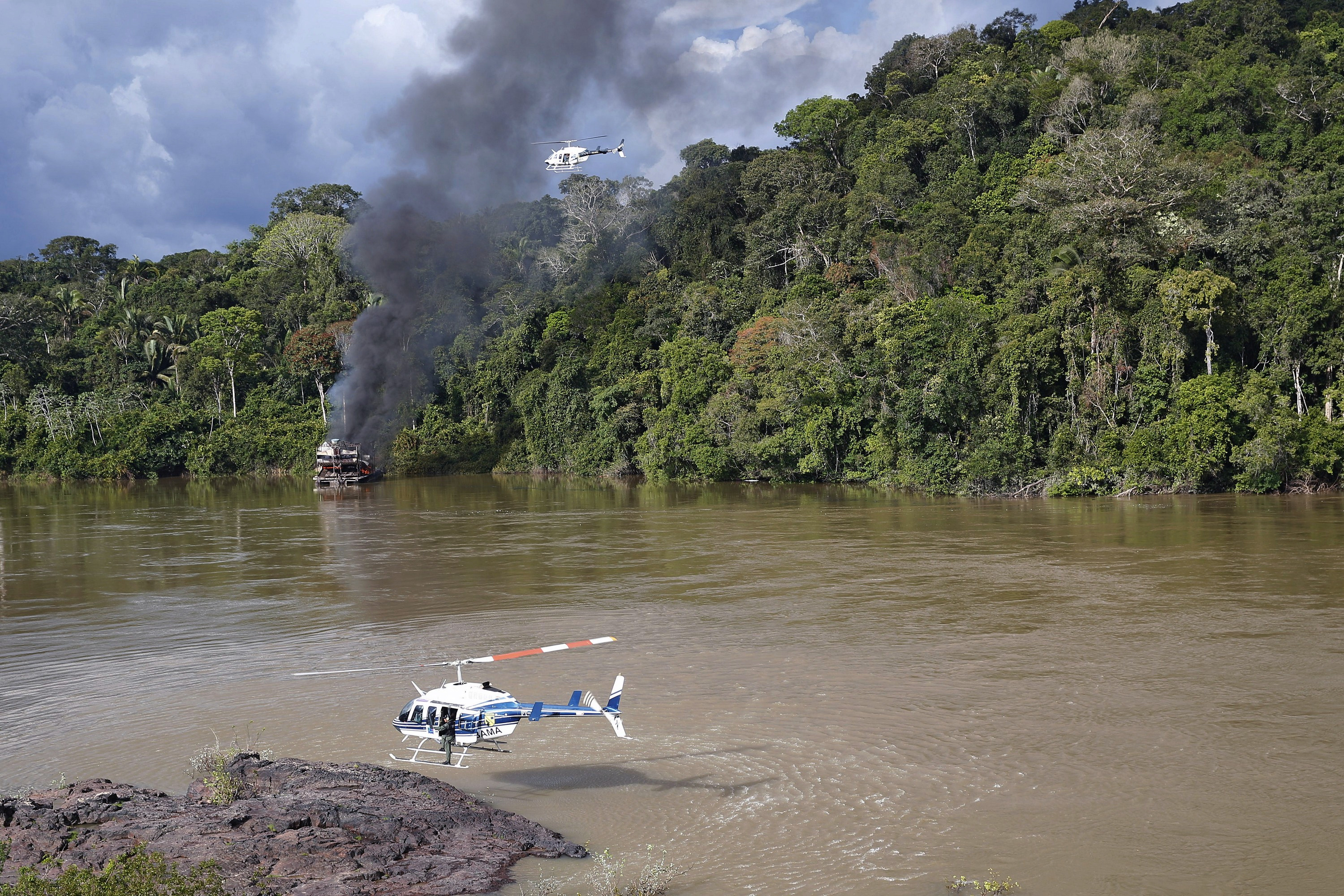

- Location within Brazil
- Nearest city: Itaituba, Pará
- Coordinates: 5.324°S 56.658°W
- Area: 427,366.56 hectares (1,056,045.8 acres)
- Designation: National forest
- Created: 2 February 1998
- Administrator: Chico Mendes Institute for Biodiversity Conservation

Itaituba II National Forest (Portuguese: Floresta Nacional de Itaituba II) is a national forest in the state of Pará, Brazil.

== Location ==
The Itaituba II National Forest is in the Amazon biome. It has an area of 427,366.56 hectares (1,056,045.8 acres). It covers parts of the municipalities of Itaituba and Trairão in the state of Pará. The Itaituba I and Itaituba II National Forests together cover 610,471.73 hectares (1,508,508.5 acres). The management plan for the two forests defined a zone of sustainable forestry management of 432,628 hectares (1,069,050 acres), of which 295,000 hectares (730,000 acres) were allocated to three forestry concessions.

== History ==
The Itaituba II National Forest was created by decree nº 2.482 of 2 February 1998. It is administered by the Chico Mendes Institute for Biodiversity Conservation (ICMBio). It is classed as IUCN protected area category VI (protected area with sustainable use of natural resources) with the objective of sustainable multiple use of forest resources and scientific research, with emphasis on methods for sustainable exploitation of native forests.

Law 12678 of 25 June 2012 amended the limits of the Amazônia, Campos Amazônicos and Mapinguari national parks, the Itaituba I, Itaituba II and Crepori national forests and the Tapajós Environmental Protection Area. All were reduced in size except the Campos Amazônicos. The area removed from the Itaituba II National Forest corresponded to the proposed Sawré Muybu Indigenous Territory, and would be partly flooded by the proposed São Luiz do Tapajós Dam on the Tapajós. Removing the area from the national forest removed an obstacle to the proposed dam.

== Conservation ==
The national forest is in a region that contains 12 sustainable use conservation areas and 6 fully protected areas. The fully protected areas, which cover 6,670,422 hectares (16,482,970 acres), are the Amazônia, Jamanxim, Rio Novo and Serra do Pardo national parks, the Nascentes da Serra do Cachimbo Biological Reserve and the Terra do Meio Ecological Station. The sustainable use areas include the Tapajós environmental protection area and the Altamira, Amaná, Jamanxim, Trairão, Itaituba I, Itaituba II and Tapajós national forests, covering a total of 7,555,889 hectares (18,671,010 acres). The proposed South Amazon Ecological Corridor would link the conservation unit to other protected areas and indigenous territories in the region.

== Sources ==
- Ayres, José Márcio; Da Fonseca, Gustavo A. B.; Rylands, Anthony B.; Queiroz, Helder L.; Pinto, Luiz Paulo; Masterson, Donald; Cavalcanti, Roberto B. (2005), Os Corredores Ecológicos das Florestas Tropicais do Brasil (PDF) (in Portuguese), Sociedade Civil Mamirauá, archived from the original (PDF) on 2016-07-31
- "Complexo hidrelétrico inundará território munduruku na Amazônia", Avispa Midia (in Portuguese), 22 January 2016, archived from the original on 17 February 2017
- Flona de Itaituba 2 (in Portuguese), Chico Mendes Institute for Biodiversity Conservation, archived from the original on 2019-08-08
- Florestas Nacionais de Itaituba I e II (PA) (in Portuguese), Serviço Florestal Brasileiro, archived from the original on 2016-04-02
- PARNA dos Campos Amazônicos (in Portuguese), ISA: Instituto Socioambiental
- Plano de Manejo da Floresta Nacional do Trairão, Localizada no Estado do Pará (PDF), Brasília – DF: ICMBio, archived from the original (PDF) on 2017-02-11
- Unidade de Conservação: Floresta Nacional de Itaituba II (in Portuguese), MMA: Ministério do Meio Ambiente
