= Terra do Meio Ecological Station =

Ecological station in Brazil

- Estação Ecológica da Terra do Meio
- IUCN category Ia (strict nature reserve)
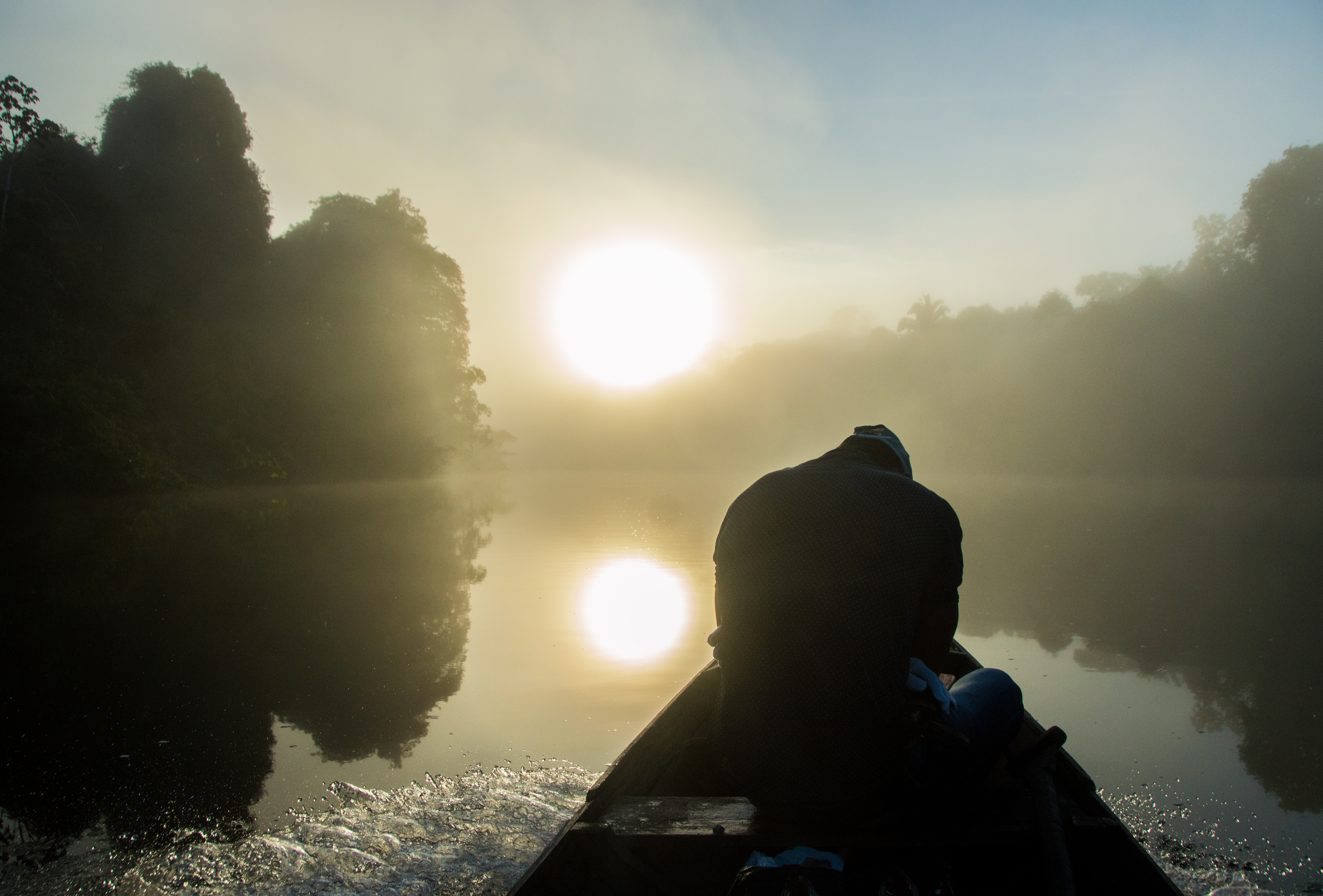
- Terra do Meio Ecological Station

- Location within Brazil
- Nearest city: Uruará, Pará
- Coordinates: 5.084°S 53.716°W
- Area: 3,373,133.89 hectares (8,335,195.4 acres)
- Designation: Ecological station
- Created: 17 February 2005
- Administrator: Chico Mendes Institute for Biodiversity Conservation

Terra do Meio Ecological Station (Portuguese: Estação Ecológica da Terra do Meio) is an ecological station (ESEC) in the state of Pará, Brazil.

== Location ==
The Terra do Meio Ecological Station has an area of 3,373,133.89 hectares (8,335,195.4 acres). It covers parts of the municipalities of Altamira and São Félix do Xingu in the state of Pará. The station covers parts of the lowlands and the residual plateau of the southern Amazon. It lies between the Xingu River and its tributary the Iriri River, which runs through the station from south to north. The Iriri rises in the Serra do Cachimbo and flows for 900 kilometres (560 mi) before joining the Xingu. The rivers vary greatly in volume depending on the season, and in the dry season include waterfalls, rocks and rapids.

The ESEC borders the 445,408 hectares (1,100,630 acres) Serra do Pardo National Park to the southeast. The proposed South Amazon Ecological Corridor would link the ESEC to other protected areas and indigenous territories in the region.

== Environment ==
The Terra do Meio Ecological Station is in the Amazon biome. Temperatures range from 19 to 28 °C (66 to 82 °F) with an average of 23 °C (73 °F). Average annual rainfall is 1,855 millimetres (73.0 in). During the dry season from May to November there is elevated risk of natural or man-made fires. Soils are generally poor in nutrients. 76% of the unit is covered by open submontane rainforest with lianas, and 18.4% is covered by open submontane rainforest with emergent canopy. Smaller areas hold dense submontane rainforest with uniform canopy, open submontane rainforest with palm trees and dense alluvial rainforest.

== Birds ==
Migratory birds that pass through the ecological station include osprey (Pandion haliaetus), spotted sandpiper (Actitis macularius), purple martin (Progne subis), sand martin (Riparia riparia) and barn swallow (Hirundo rustica). Endemic birds include white-crested guan (Penelope pileata), red-throated piping guan (Pipile cujubi), dark-winged trumpeter (Psophia viridis), blue-necked jacamar (Galbula cyanicollis), rufous-necked puffbird (Malacoptila rufa), red-necked aracari (Pteroglossus bitorquatus), Gould's toucanet (Selenidera gouldii), Sclater's antwren (Myrmotherula sclateri), band-tailed antbird (Hypocnemoides maculicauda), Amazonian antpitta (Hylopezus berlepschi) and Amazonian barred woodcreeper (Dendrocolaptes certhia).

== Conservation ==
The Terra do Meio Ecological Station was created by decree on 17 February 2005, and is administered by the Chico Mendes Institute for Biodiversity Conservation. Protected species in the park include the white-cheeked spider monkey (Ateles marginatus). The ecological station is classed as IUCN protected area category Ia (strict nature reserve). The purpose is to conserve nature and support scientific research. The conservation unit is supported by the Amazon Region Protected Areas Program.

The management plan for the ecological station was published on 23 December 2015. The authors had to deal with the issue of land speculators, settlers and 15 families of traditional inhabitants. The traditional families, with their valuable knowledge, were allowed to stay in an "intensive use zone" and were integrated into management of the area. The objective of the zone was to maintain the natural environment with little human impact, provide places for developing awareness programs, environmental education and research. It allowed for houses, gardens, and limited extraction of resources, mostly for personal use, according to traditional practices.

The ecological station is in a region that contains 12 sustainable use conservation areas and 6 fully protected areas. The fully protected areas, which cover 6,670,422 hectares (16,482,970 acres), are the Amazônia, Jamanxim, Rio Novo and Serra do Pardo national parks, the Nascentes da Serra do Cachimbo Biological Reserve and the Terra do Meio Ecological Station. The sustainable use areas include the Tapajós environmental protection area and the Altamira, Amaná, Jamanxim, Trairão, Itaituba I, Itaituba II and Tapajós national forests, covering a total of 7,555,889 hectares (18,671,010 acres).

== Sources ==
- Amazon Biome: protected areas: Coordinated audit, Brasília: Federal Court of Accounts of Brazil, 2014
- Ayres, José Márcio; Da Fonseca, Gustavo A. B.; Rylands, Anthony B.; Queiroz, Helder L.; Pinto, Luiz Paulo; Masterson, Donald; Cavalcanti, Roberto B. (2005), Os Corredores Ecológicos das Florestas Tropicais do Brasil (PDF) (in Portuguese), Sociedade Civil Mamirauá, archived from the original (PDF) on 2016-07-31
- Esec da Terra do Meio (in Portuguese), Chico Mendes Institute for Biodiversity Conservation, archived from the original on 2016-08-16
- Full list: PAs supported by ARPA, ARPA
- PARNA da Serra do Pardo (in Portuguese), ISA: Instituto Socioambiental
- Plano de Manejo da Floresta Nacional do Trairão, Localizada no Estado do Pará (PDF), Brasília – DF: ICMBio, archived from the original (PDF) on 2017-02-11
- Ronaldo Weigand Jr. (22 February 2016), "Plano de Manejo da Estação Ecológica da Terra do Meio (EETM)", Nave Terra (in Portuguese)
- Unidade de Conservação: Estação Ecológica da Terra do Meio (in Portuguese), MMA: Ministério do Meio Ambiente
