= Rio Novo National Park =

National park in Pará, Brazil

- Parque Nacional do Rio Novo
- IUCN category II (national park)
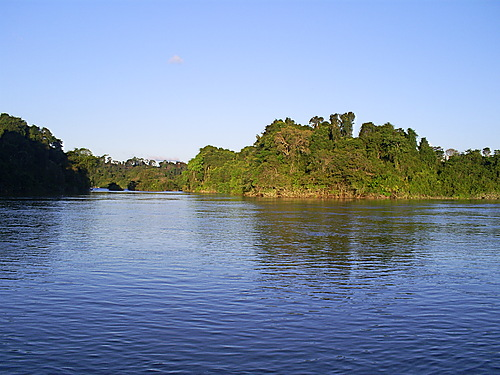
- Rio Novo

- Location within Brazil
- Nearest city: Itaituba, Pará
- Coordinates: 7°57′32″S 56°40′23″W
- Area: 538,151 hectares (1,329,800 acres)
- Designation: National park
- Created: 13 February 2006
- Administrator: ICMBio

Rio Novo National Park (Portuguese: Parque Nacional do Rio Novo) is a national park in the state of Pará, Brazil.

== Location ==
The Rio Novo National Park has an area of 538,151 hectares (1,329,800 acres). It covers parts of the municipalities of Novo Progresso and Itaituba in Pará. The park is in an area of low-relief plateaus and depressions. The east is in the Jamanxim-Xingu depression, with flat terrain at elevations of 100 to 400 metres (330 to 1,310 ft), rising in small areas to the residual tablelands of southern Pará, with clusters of hills and low mountains with heights of 350 to 750 metres (1,150 to 2,460 ft). The west is on the Parauari-Tropas plateau, broken hilly country with elevations from 150 to 400 metres (490 to 1,310 ft) The southwest is dominated by the Serra do Cachimbo, rising to 500 to 650 metres (1,640 to 2,130 ft), with a sharp escarpment forming its northern face.

The park is in the basins of the Jamanxim and Crepori rivers, tributaries of the Tapajós. The main river in the park is the Rio Novo, a major tributary of the Jamanxim formed by the juncture of the Inambé and Marrom rivers. There are several waterfalls and rapids in the park due to the drop from the south to the north. Most of the streams have been contaminated by the illegal mining in the region. The park adjoins the Mundurucu Indigenous Territory to the west. It adjoins the Jamanxim National Forest to the east.

== Environment ==
The Rio Novo National Park is in the Amazon biome. Average annual rainfall is 2,337 millimetres (92.0 in). Temperatures range from 24 to 33 °C (75 to 91 °F) with an average of 27 °C (81 °F). It is in a region of contact between the cerrado and Amazon forest, and has at least six different zones of vegetation due to the difference in altitude between the Serra do Cachimbo and the Amazon lowlands. Roughly 53% is covered by open rainforest, 33% by dense rainforest and 14% by contact between savannah and seasonal forest. The endangered white-cheeked spider monkey (Ateles marginatus) is an endemic species.

== Conservation ==
The Rio Novo National Park was created by decree on 13 February 2006 and is administered by the Chico Mendes Institute for Biodiversity Conservation (ICMBio). An advisory council was created on 8 November 2011. It is classified as IUCN protected area category II (national park). The objective is to preserve natural ecosystems of great ecological relevance and scenic beauty and to enable scientific research, educational activities, environmental interpretation, recreation in contact with nature and ecological tourism. The park is open to visitors with special permission.

The park is in a region that contains 12 sustainable use conservation areas and 6 fully protected areas. The fully protected areas, which cover 6,670,422 hectares (16,482,970 acres), are the Amazônia, Jamanxim, Rio Novo and Serra do Pardo national parks, the Nascentes da Serra do Cachimbo Biological Reserve and the Terra do Meio Ecological Station. The sustainable use areas include the Tapajós environmental protection area and the Altamira, Amaná, Jamanxim, Trairão, Itaituba I, Itaituba II and Tapajós national forests, covering a total of 7,555,889 hectares (18,671,010 acres). The conservation unit is supported by the Amazon Region Protected Areas Program.

== Sources ==
- Full list: PAs supported by ARPA, ARPA
- Parna do Rio Novo (in Portuguese), Chico Mendes Institute for Biodiversity Conservation, archived from the original on 2019-01-24
- PARNA do Rio Novo (in Portuguese), ISA: Instituto Socioambiental
- Parque Nacional do Rio Novo (in Portuguese), Via Rural, archived from the original on June 9, 2016
- Plano de Manejo da Floresta Nacional do Trairão, Localizada no Estado do Pará (PDF), Brasília – DF: ICMBio, archived from the original (PDF) on 2017-02-11
- Terra Indígena Mundurucu (in Portuguese), ISA: Instituto Socioambiental
- Unidade de Conservação: Parque Nacional do Rio Novo (in Portuguese), MMA: Ministério do Meio Ambiente
