= Trairão National Forest =

- Floresta Nacional do Trairão
- IUCN category VI (protected area with sustainable use of natural resources)
- Location within Brazil
- Nearest city: Itaituba, Pará
- Coordinates: 4.907°S 55.545°W
- Area: 257,526 hectares (636,360 acres)
- Designation: National forest
- Created: 13 February 2006
- Administrator: Chico Mendes Institute for Biodiversity Conservation

Trairão National Forest (Portuguese: Floresta Nacional do Trairão) is a national forest in the state of Pará, Brazil. It contains a large area of Amazon rainforest with high biodiversity. It is a sustainable use conservation unit in which logging is allowed subject to a management plan, and was created in an effort to curb illegal deforestation in the area.

== Location ==
Sketch map of Tapajos basin conservation units: 13. Trairão National Forest

The Trairão National Forest covers 257,526 hectares (636,360 acres) of Amazonia biome. It was created on 13 February 2006 and is administered by the federal Chico Mendes Institute for Biodiversity Conservation. It covers parts of the municipalities of Trairão (69.2%), Rurópolis (22.0%) and Itaituba (8.8%) in the state of Pará. The main urban centres nearby are Trairão, Itaituba, Rurópolis and Santarém. It borders the Riozinho do Anfrísio Extractive Reserve to the east and the Jamanxim National Park to the south. The forest is named after the Trairão municipality, which in turn is named after the trairão (Hoplias lacerdae) fish. The area around the forest is home to 260,905 people, with a population density of 1.08 inhabitants per square kilometre.

The forest is in a region that contains 12 sustainable use conservation areas and 6 fully protected areas. The fully protected areas, which cover 6,670,422 hectares (16,482,970 acres), are the Amazônia, Jamanxim, Rio Novo and Serra do Pardo national parks, the Nascentes da Serra do Cachimbo Biological Reserve and the Terra do Meio Ecological Station. The sustainable use areas include the Tapajós environmental protection area and the Altamira, Amaná, Jamanxim, Trairão, Itaituba I, Itaituba II and Tapajós national forests, covering a total of 7,555,889 hectares (18,671,010 acres).

== Access ==
The unit is accessible via roads leading from the BR-163 highway, which is west of the forest. Itaituba may also be reached by boat along the Tapajós River, which runs further to the west. The boat journey from Santarém to Itaituba takes 15 hours. The forest lies in parts of the Tapajós and Xingu river basins. The main watercourses within the park are the Branco, Itapacurá and Cuparí rivers. Although there are many rivers and streams, few of them are suitable for river transport due to shallow depth, rapids, tree trunks, narrow channels, sharp curves and fallen trees. In the flood period it is also hard to identify the navigation channel.

== Environment ==
Average altitude is 51 metres (167 ft). Average annual rainfall is about 2,000 millimetres (79 in), with a cooler rainy season in December to May and warmer dry season from June to November. Annual temperature is 25 to 28 °C (77 to 82 °F). Vegetation is 70% dense rainforest and 30% open rainforest.

The forest is in a watershed divide that creates wide variations in habitat including waterfalls, igapó flooded forest and riparian forest, resulting in high biodiversity. A short study of herpetofauna in two locations of the forest in September 2009 recorded 94 species of amphibians and reptiles. There were 35 species of amphibian, four species of turtle, the smooth-fronted caiman, 23 species of lizard and 31 species of snake. Most of the species are typical of tropical rainforests. Some of the recorded species had dubious taxonomy and may be new to science. 64 species of fish have been identified from the families of Characiformes (33), Siluriformes (16), Perciformes (7) Gymnotiformes (6), Cyprinodontiformes (1) and Synbranchiformes (1).

== Conservation ==
The Trairão National Forest is classed as IUCN protected area category VI (protected area with sustainable use of natural resources). The purpose is to support sustainable multiple use of forest resources and scientific research, with emphasis on methods for sustainable exploitation of native forests. Timber extraction is permitted. The forest was created as part of a conservation strategy to contain the advancing arc of deforestation in the Amazon and to minimise the loss of biodiversity due to logging, monoculture, illegal farming and cattle. The area accessible from BR-163 had already been 10.4% deforested, and the ecosystems were highly fragmented. It is hoped that modern multiple-use forest management will increase the number of jobs in the region, providing income and improved quality of life to the population.

The Management Plan for the forest was published in March 2010. Part of the forest in the south and south west has been identified as important for biodiversity conservation and confirmed as an area for conservation. The Management Plan noted that the forest was subject to illegal logging, illegal extraction of non-timber products, hunting, fishing, roads and the development of farms. Conversion of the rainforest into pasture, as has happened in other parts of Pará, will probably cause most species of herpetofauna to become locally extinct, since they are adapted to a humid microclimate.

== Sources ==
- Floresta Nacional do Trairão (in Portuguese), Chico Mendes Institute for Biodiversity Conservation
- Mendes-Pinto, Telêmaco Jason; Souza, Sergio Marques de (20 November 2011), "Preliminary assessment of amphibians and reptiles from Floresta Nacional do Trairão, with a new snake record for the Pará state, Brazilian Amazon", Salamandra, 47 (4), ISSN 0036-3375
- Pedroza, Wellington Silva; Vasconcelos Ribeiro, Frank Raynner; Almeida, Fabiane Ferreira de (2010), "Ictiofauna da Porção Oeste da Floresta Nacional do Trairão – Bases para a Conservação e Manejo" (PDF), Anais do I Seminário Internacional de Ciências do Ambiente e Sustentabilidade na Amazônia
- Plano de Manejo da Floresta Nacional do Trairão, Localizada no Estado do Pará (PDF), Brasília – DF: ICMBio
- Unidade de Conservação: Floresta Nacional do Trairão (in Portuguese), MMA: Ministério do Meio Ambiente
