= Hisonotus bockmanni =

Scientific classification
- Domain: Eukaryota
- Kingdom: Animalia
- Phylum: Chordata
- Class: Actinopterygii
- Order: Siluriformes
- Family: Loricariidae
- Genus: Hisonotus
- Species: H. bockmanni

Binomial name
- Hisonotus bockmanni Carvalho & Datovo, 2012

Species of catfish

Hisonotus bockmanni is a species of catfish in the family Loricariidae. It is native to South America, where it occurs in the basins of the Amazon River and the Cururu River in Brazil. The species reaches 2.4 cm (0.9 inches) SL and was described in 2012.
