= Sai Cinza Indigenous Territory =

Indigenous territory in Pará, Brazil

- Location within Brazil
- Nearest city: Jacareacanga, Pará
- Coordinates: 6°27′52″S 57°59′30″W
- Area: 126,000 ha (490 sq mi)
- Designation: Indigenous territory
- Created: 26 December 1991

The Sai Cinza Indigenous Territory (Portuguese: Terra Indígena Sai Cinza) is an indigenous territory in the state of Pará, Brazil. A proposed dam on the Tapajós river is on hold since it would flood part of the territory, and the constitution does not allow projects that would force relocation of indigenous people.

== Location ==
Sketch map of Tapajos River: 16. Sai Cinza Indigenous Territory

The Sai Cinza Indigenous Territory is in the municipality of Jacareacanga, Pará. It has an area of 126,000 hectares (310,000 acres). It adjoins the Mundurucu Indigenous Territory to the south. The western part of the territory is bounded by the Tapajós river to the north. In the east the territory contains land on both sides of the river. The reserve is entirely within the Tapajós basin and the Amazon biome. Vegetation is 82.69% dense rainforest and 17.31 savanna-rainforest contact.

== History ==
The Sai Cinza Indigenous Territory was declared by decree 94.604 of 14 July 1987. It was approved by decree 393 of 26 December 1991.

The reservoir of the proposed Chacorão Dam on the Tapajós river would affect the Munduruku, Kayabí and Apiacá indigenous people. As of 2010 Eletronorte had not applied for registration with the National Electricity Agency to start feasibility studies for the Chacorão hydroelectric power plant, since the dam would flood parts of the Mundurucu and Sai Cinza indigenous territories. A spokesman said that without a decree to regulate the constitution there was no way to undertake projects in indigenous territories.

A series of planning workshops in the two TIs starting in November 2011 where more than 300 indigenous people participated. In October 2013 a seminar was held in the village of Sai-Cinza on creating a Territorial and Environmental Management Plan (PGTA) for the Munduruku and Sai-Cinza Indigenous Territories. The seminar was attended by representatives from all parts of the two TIs and from involved government and civil society organizations.

== People ==
The territory is inhabited by the Munduruku people. The estimated population was 529 in 1990, rising to 1,022 by 2000 and to 1,739 by 2013. Indigenous organizations include Associação Da'uk (AIP), Associação Indígena Wuyxaximã, Conselho Indígena Munduruku do Alto Tapajós (CIMAT) and Kerepo - Associação de Produtores Indígenas (KEREPO). The state is represented in the territory by the Fundação Nacional do Índio (Funai). There is an evangelist Assembly of God mission and a Brazilian Baptist Convention mission. There are 13 mining concessions in the region.

== See also ==
- Mundurucu Indigenous Territory
- Electrobras

== Sources ==
- "Chacorão Perfil da usina", Barragens na Amazônia (in Portuguese), archived from the original on 2017-12-31
- Couto, Fábio (7 May 2010), "Usinas-plataforma: aposta no baixo impacto", Canal Energia (in Portuguese), Eletronorte, archived from the original on 2017-02-14
- Plano de Gestão Territorial e Ambiental das Terras Indígenas Munduruku e Sai-Cinza é debatido em seminário (in Portuguese), Funai, 22 October 2013
- Terra Indígena Sai Cinza (in Portuguese), ISA: Instituto Socioambiental
