= Munduruku Indigenous Territory =

Indigenous territory in Pará, Brazil

Mundurucu Indigenous Territory
- Terra Indígena Mundurucu
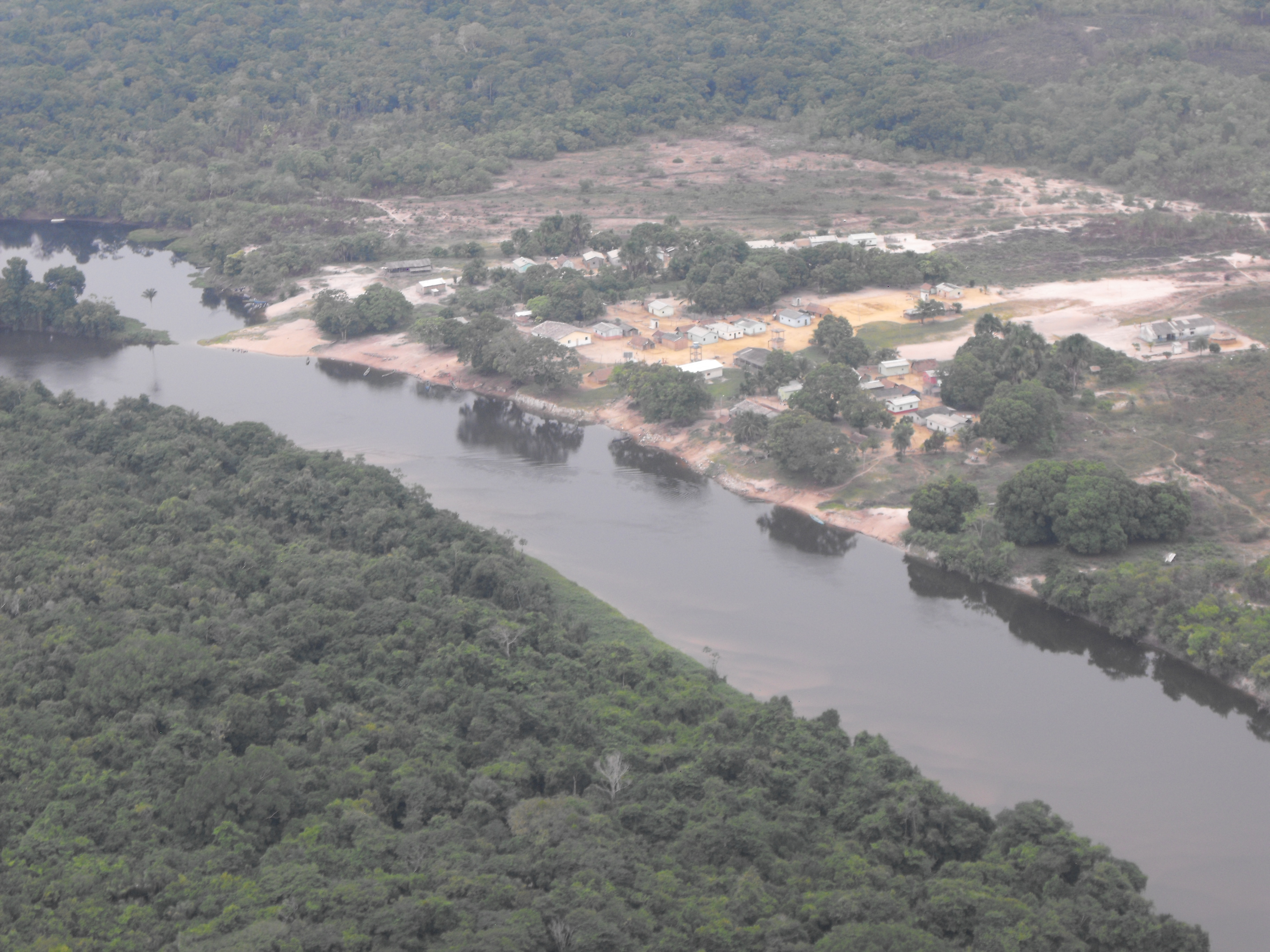
- Waro Apompu: Munduruku village on the Cururu River

- Location within Brazil
- Nearest city: Jacareacanga, Pará
- Coordinates: 7°13′53″S 57°39′55″W
- Area: 2,382,000 ha (9,200 sq mi)
- Designation: Indigenous territory
- Created: 26 February 2004

The Mundurucu Indigenous Territory (Portuguese: Terra Indígena Mundurucu) is an indigenous territory in the state of Pará, Brazil. It is occupied by the Apiacá and Munduruku people. A proposed dam on the Tapajós river is on hold since it would flood part of the territory, and the constitution does not allow projects that would force relocation of indigenous people.

== Location ==
Sketch map of Tapajos River: 17. Mundurucu Indigenous Territory

The Mundurucu Indigenous Territory (TI) is divided between the municipalities of Itaituba and Jacareacanga, Para. It has an area of 2,382,000 hectares (5,890,000 acres). The territory adjoins the Sai Cinza Indigenous Territory to the north and the Kayabi Indigenous Territory to the south. The Tapajós river and its tributary the Teles Pires define the north and west boundary of the territory. To the east it adjoins the Crepori National Forest and the Rio Novo National Park.

The TI lies entirely in the Tapajós river basin, in the Amazon biome. Vegetation includes dense rainforest (17.27%), open rainforest (24.28%), savanna-rainforest contact (37.51%), savanna-seasonal forest contact (14.60%), as well as small area of rainforest-seasonal forest contact, savanna-pioneer formation contact, seasonal deciduous forest and savanna. The people of the territory define regions in terms of rivers. The main ones are the Teles Pires River, Anipiri River, Tapajós River, Cururu River, Igarapé Wareri, Igarapé Parawadukti, Cadiriri River, Cabitutu River, das Tropas River, Kaburuá River, Igarapé Preto and Igarapé Maçaranduba.

== History ==
The Mundurucu Indigenous Territory was officially recognized by decree of 26 February 2004. The reservoir of the proposed Chacorão Dam on the Tapajós river would affect the Munduruku, Kayabí and Apiacá indigenous people. It would flood 18,700 hectares (46,000 acres) of the Munduruku Indigenous Territory. As of 2010 Eletronorte had not applied for registration with the National Electricity Agency to start feasibility studies for the Chacorão hydroelectric power plant. A spokesman said that without change to the constitution there was no way to undertake projects in indigenous territories.

== Society ==
In 2002 it was estimated that there were 10,065 indigenous people in the Upper Tapajós Region, in about 80 villages. However, villages are constantly being dissolved and reconstituted. The largest numbers of Munduruku live in the Mundurucu Indigenous Territory, with most of the villages along the Cururu River, a tributary of the Tapajós. The Munduruku Indigenous Territory is occupied mainly by Munduruku but also by people of the Apiacá, Kayabí, Kayapo, Tembé and Rikbaktsa ethnic groups.

Estimated population of the territory was 2,420 in 1990, 5,075 in 1995 and had risen to 6,518 by 2012. There are two indigenous organizations, the Associação Da'uk (AIP) and the Conselho Indígena Munduruku do Alto Tapajós (CIMAT). The state is represented in the territory by the Fundação Nacional do Índio (Funai). The Catholic Church operates the Missão de São Francisco. The territory has a number of FUNASA bases, each with a small building with a waiting room, laboratory for testing for malaria, hospitalization room and staff accommodation.

== Sources ==
- "Chacorão Perfil da usina", Barragens na Amazônia (in Portuguese)
- Couto, Fábio (7 May 2010), "Usinas-plataforma: aposta no baixo impacto", Canal Energia (in Portuguese), Eletronorte
- Fearnside, Philip M. (2015), "Amazon dams and waterways: Brazil's Tapajo´s Basin plans", Ambio, 44 (5): 426–439, doi:10.1007/s13280-015-0642-z, PMC 4510327, PMID 25794814
- Melo, Juliana; Villanueva, Rosa Elisa (2008), Levantamento Etnoecológico MUNDURUKU Terra Indígena Munduruku (PDF), Brasília: FUNAI – Fundação Nacional do Índio / PPTAL – Projeto Integrado de Proteção às Populações e Terras Indígenas da Amazônia Legal / GTZ – Deutsche Gesellschaft für Technische Zussamenarbeit (GTZ) GmbH, archived from the original (PDF) on 2017-02-15
- Munduruku: Localização e população (in Portuguese), ISA: Instituto Socioambeintal
- Terra Indígena Mundurucu (in Portuguese), ISA: Instituto Socioambiental
