= Itapacurá River =

River in Pará, Brazil

- Location within Brazil
- Native name: Rio Itapacurá (Portuguese)

Location
- Country: Brazil

Physical characteristics
- Mouth
  - coordinates: 4.392236°S 56.083873°W

Basin features
- River system: Tapajós

The Itapacurá River (Portuguese: Rio Itapacurá) is a river in the state of Pará, Brazil. It is a right tributary of the Tapajós, which it enters a few kilometres upstream from Miritituba, on the opposite bank from Itaituba.

The upper part of the river flows through the Trairão National Forest.
