= Novo Progresso Airport =

Novo Progresso Airport Aeroporto de Novo Progresso
- IATA: NPR; ICAO: SJNP; LID: PA0026

Summary
- Airport type: Public
- Serves: Novo Progresso
- Time zone: BRT (UTC−03:00)
- Elevation AMSL: 231 m (758 ft)
- Coordinates: 07°07′34″S 055°24′04″W

Map
- Location in Brazil NPR (Brazil)

Runways
Direction	Length		Surface
Direction	m	ft	Surface
18/36	1,200	3,937	Gravel
- Source: ANAC, DECEA

Novo Progresso Airport (IATA: NPR, ICAO: SJNP) is the airport serving Novo Progresso, Brazil.

== Access ==
The airport is located 3 km (2 mi) from downtown Novo Progresso.

== See also ==
- List of airports in Brazil
