= Das Tropas River =

- Location within Brazil
- Native name: Rio das Tropas (Portuguese)

Location
- Country: Brazil

Physical characteristics
- Source
  - location: Pará state
- Mouth
  - coordinates: 6.129809°S 57.633164°W

Basin features
- River system: Tapajós

The Das Tropas River (Portuguese: Rio das Tropas) is a river of Pará state in north-central Brazil. It is a right tributary of the Tapajós River; the mouth is located on the eastern side of the Tapajós about 200 km (120 mi) after the Juruena–Teles Pires junction.

The river flows through the Itaituba I National Forest, a 220,639 hectares (545,210 acres) sustainable use conservation area established in 1998. The lower part of the river flows through the Mundurucu Indigenous Territory.

== See also ==
- List of rivers of Pará
