= Novo Progresso =

Municipality in Pará, Brazil

Coordinates: 7.14694°S 55.3819°W

- Municipality
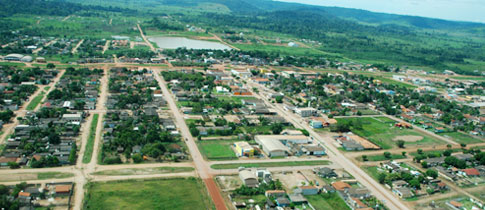
- Aerial view of Novo Progresso

- Flag
- Interactive map of Novo Progresso
- Country: Brazil
- Region: Northern
- State: Pará
- Mesoregion: Sudoeste Paraense

Population (2020)
  - Total: 25,766
- Time zone: UTC−3 (BRT)

Novo Progresso is a municipality in the state of Pará in the Northern region of Brazil.

The city is served by Novo Progresso Airport

== Historical context and purpose ==
The municipality of Novo Progresso, Jacareacanga and Trairão was separated from Itaituba on December 13, 1991.

== Geography ==
The municipality contains part of the 342,192 hectares (845,570 acres) Nascentes da Serra do Cachimbo Biological Reserve, a strictly protected conservation unit established in 2005. It also contains part of the 538,151 hectares (1,329,800 acres) Rio Novo National Park, a conservation unit created in 2006. In contains the 1,301,683 hectares (3,216,530 acres) Jamanxim National Forest, a sustainable use conservation unit created in 2006 in which uncontrolled clearance of the Amazon rainforest was proceeding at a rapid pace.

=== Climate ===
Climate data for Novo Progresso
Month	Jan	Feb	Mar	Apr	May	Jun	Jul	Aug	Sep	Oct	Nov	Dec	Year
Mean daily maximum °C (°F)	29.9 (85.8)	29.8 (85.6)	30.4 (86.7)	31.4 (88.5)	31.8 (89.2)	32.4 (90.3)	33.3 (91.9)	34.5 (94.1)	33.4 (92.1)	32.7 (90.9)	31.9 (89.4)	30.8 (87.4)	31.9 (89.3)
Daily mean °C (°F)	25.2 (77.4)	25.1 (77.2)	25.7 (78.3)	26.0 (78.8)	26.0 (78.8)	25.3 (77.5)	25.3 (77.5)	26.0 (78.8)	26.4 (79.5)	26.5 (79.7)	26.1 (79.0)	25.6 (78.1)	25.8 (78.4)
Mean daily minimum °C (°F)	20.5 (68.9)	20.5 (68.9)	21.0 (69.8)	20.6 (69.1)	20.3 (68.5)	18.3 (64.9)	17.3 (63.1)	17.6 (63.7)	19.5 (67.1)	20.3 (68.5)	20.4 (68.7)	20.5 (68.9)	19.7 (67.5)
Average precipitation mm (inches)	326 (12.8)	360 (14.2)	334 (13.1)	250 (9.8)	88 (3.5)	36 (1.4)	14 (0.6)	26 (1.0)	117 (4.6)	183 (7.2)	215 (8.5)	318 (12.5)	2,267 (89.2)
Source: http://en.climate-data.org/location/44150/

== See also ==
- List of municipalities in Pará
