= Jacareacanga =

- Municipality
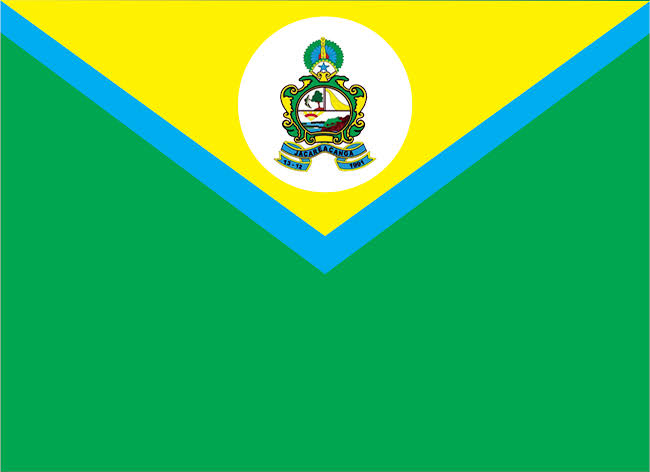
- Flag

- Location in Pará

- Location in Brazil
- Coordinates: 6.2226°S 57.7617°W
- Country: Brazil
- Region: Northern
- State: Pará
- Mesoregion: Sudoeste Paraense

Population (2022)
  - Total: 24,042
- Time zone: UTC−3 (BRT)

Jacareacanga is a municipality in the state of Pará in the Northern region of Brazil. It is at the very centre of South America.

== Conservation ==
The municipality contains the 739,806-hectare (1,828,100-acre) Crepori National Forest, created in 2006. It contains 14% of the 1,988,445-hectare (4,913,550-acre) Tapajós Environmental Protection Area, created in 2006. It contains part of the Amaná National Forest, a 539,571-hectare (1,333,310-acre) sustainable use conservation unit created in 2006.

== Indigenous territories ==
The municipality contains the 126,000-hectare (310,000-acre) Sai Cinza Indigenous Territory, established in 1991. It contains part of the 2,382,000-hectare (5,890,000-acre) Mundurucu Indigenous Territory, established in 2004. It would contain part of the reservoir of the proposed Chacorão Dam on the Tapajós, if approved. However, as of 2010 Eletronorte had not applied for registration with the National Electricity Agency to start feasibility studies for the Chacorão hydroelectric power plant, since the dam would flood parts of the Mundurucu and Sai Cinza indigenous territories. A spokesman said that without a decree to regulate the constitution there was no way to undertake projects in indigenous territories.

== See also ==
- List of municipalities in Pará
