= Apiacá =

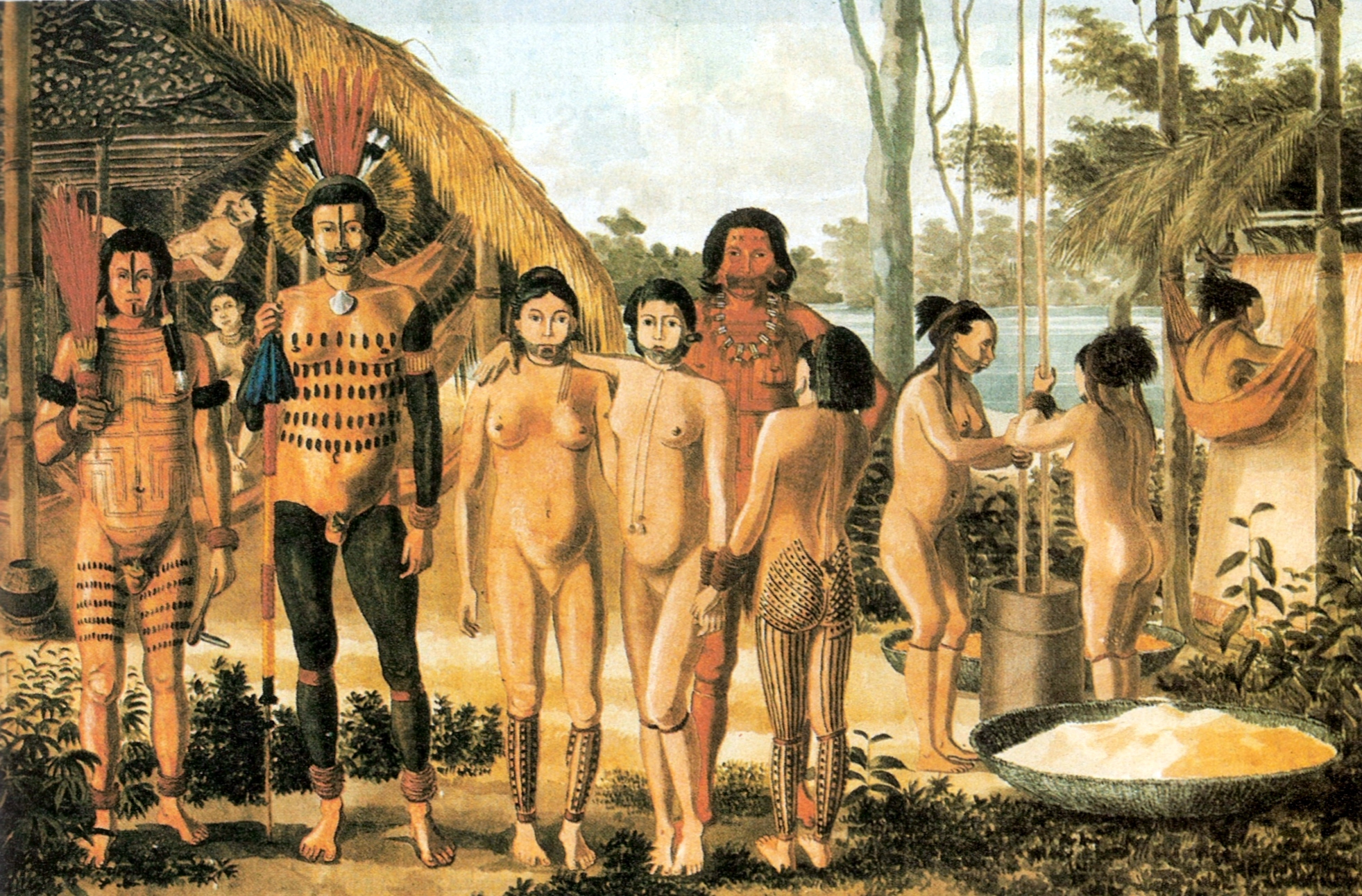
- Apiacá people, painted by Hércules Florence

Total population
- 850 (2014)

Regions with significant populations
- Brazil (Mato Grosso and Pará)

Languages
- Apiaká, Portuguese

Religion
- traditional tribal religion

The Apiacá, or Apiaká, are an Indigenous people of Brazil, who live in northern Mato Grosso, near the border of Pará. They speak an Apiacá language that is a subgroup part of the Tupi-Guarani languages, though many today speak Portuguese. Prior to the 19th century, the Apiacá were a warlike tribe with a heavily agricultural culture. Around the mid-19th century, their numbers began to decline. This decrease coincided with the contact of European settlers in Brazil. Though thought to be extinct, their numbers, today, are increasing. In 2001, there were only 192 Apiaká. As of 2009, there are a thousand Apiaká people.

== Language ==
The Apiaká language belongs to subgroup VI of the Tupi-Guarani languages. After coming into contact with the Neo-Brazilians, the Apiaca language changed with combined elements of the Lingua Geral, a Tupi-based trade jargon. Today, Portuguese or Munduruku are more widely spoken as opposed to the Apiaca language, though these people have always been known by the name "Apiaca." Today there are only four people aged over 50 who speak and understand the Apiaca language, one person speaks the language fully, another two possess less proficiency and the fourth has yet to be evaluated in close detail. Therefore, the language is at grave risk of becoming extinct.

All the Apiaca speak Portuguese and those married to members of the Munduruku and Kaiabi tribes speak their spouse’s language fluently or have the ability to understand them fully. Although the Munduruku and Kaiabi languages and idioms are spoken on a day-to-day basis in the Apiaca villages, they are, however, limited to domestic spaces and informal conversations. The language used in formal conversations is Portuguese, due to contact with the Neo-Brazilians and Portuguese settlers. Although they cannot impose their own language on the co-resident Munduruku and Kaiabi people, due to such a small number of them who actually speak the Apiaca language, the Apiaca manage to impede the languages of these peoples from becoming the official languages in their villages. This allows Portuguese to function as an instrument of resistance employed by the Apiaca to prevent their cultural absorption by the Munduruku and Kaiabi tribes.

Despite the linguistic proximity, the Apiaká do not allow Kaiabi to be taught in their villages’ schools: this stems from historically bad relations with this tribe. However, due to the better relationship the Apiaca have with the Munduruku people, they permit Munduruku teachers to give lessons in their own language. For many years the Apiaca have been attempting to revive their language through the schools in their villages but have so far been unsuccessful. In recent years there has been an initiative to create a book known as the "Apiaca Word" in order to catalog the language.

== Name ==
They are also known as Apiacá or Apiake people. Apiaká is said to have come from the Tupi word apiapa which means "people" or "man". Contrary to this origin, "the Apiaká leaders explain that their people's name refers to a wasp that when attacked travels long distances to exact revenge on the aggressor with an extremely painful sting." The name of the Apiacá people explains their beliefs in war and a warrior attitude.

== Location ==
Until 1848, the Apiacá mainly were found between the left bank of the Arinos River and the right bank of the Juruena River. However, pressure from the Neo-Brazilians caused a large portion of the Apiacá tribe to migrate towards the São Manoel River. During the early late 1800s however, the Apiacá disappeared from São Manoel. In 1895, the remnants of 100 people of this tribe were found between Salto São Simão and São Florencio. Currently, because of the growing recovery of the tribe, there are 7 villages that are located in the states of Mato Grosso and Pará. These 7 villages include: Mayrob, Figueirinha, Mairowy, Bom Futuro, Vista Alegre, Minhocuçu, and Pontal.

== History ==
The earliest records concerning the Apiacá date from 1791 to 1805, although it is possible that these Indians may have encountered Europeans as early as 1747.

At the beginning of the 19th century, the Apiacá tribe consisted of nearly 16,000 people. In 1812, one settlement consisted of around 500 people of which half were warriors. They were once a large tribe until the rubber boom took over Amazonia. The rubber boom also pushed and scattered the Apiacá away from their historical territory. The Apiacá had a strong fighting culture. They often fought with their nearby competitors, such as the Tapanyuna tribe, located on the right side of the Arinos River. However, the Apiacá did not fight for materials, but instead to avenge past conflicts. With around 200 to 300 warriors, every year they would march to battle against another tribe. Apiacá would also practice cannibalism on their prisoners. Throughout the existence of the Apiacá, their numbers have declined dramatically. Because of the establishment of the "Collectoria estadol do Mato Grosso" in 1912, many were killed and 32 remained. They were killed in compensation for an attack they made at the collector’s office. In 1916 there was evidence of some black people having been assimilated into the tribe.

In 1957, two ethnologists, undertaking a study of indigenous groups in Brazil, mistakenly declared the Apiacá extinct. They posited a number of possible causes for this supposed extinction: disease epidemics, massacres stemming from resistance to colonization, warfare with neighboring native people, and assimilation into other indigenous groups. In fact, during this entire time the tribe was still very much alive, living amongst the Kaiabi and Munduruku peoples but preserving many aspects of their own distinct culture.

== Culture and customs ==
The earliest records of the Apiaca people suggest that they had large plots of cultivated fields, and grew a great array of crops. Crops harvested include sweet cassava (manioc), cara, yams, peanuts, sweet potatoes, maize, beans, lima beans, pumpkins, cotton, and as of 1848, watermelons. Planting and harvesting were typically communal activities, although typically performed by women. Although early sources do not make mention of any domestic animals, by the mid-19th century the Apiaca came to have pigs, dogs, chickens, ducks, and several other birds. They hunted peccaries, tapirs, and capybaras, and used baskets set at the bottom of weirs across the mouths of streams in order to catch fish.

Apiaca settlements were formerly beside the river and typically consisted of a single, large house surrounded by a clearing. The huts were rectangular and covered with thatched roofs, and the walls were made of bark or palm. Inside the homes, cotton hammocks, made of either coarse fabric or net, were hung along the walls. Large bark canoes provided transportation across the waterways. Baskets, trays, sieves, and supports for various vessels were woven with strips of creeper, and ceramic pots, pans, and dishes were manufactured. Musical instruments were a part of their culture as well, as they had drums, rattles, and bamboo trumpets. Weapons and ornaments were the only forms of private property. Iron tools obtained from Europeans were of great value, although the Apiaca occasionally stole them from the Europeans.

Each Apiaca communal hut constituted a settlement and had at least one chief. The title of a chief was passed from father to son or, in the absence of an heir apparent, to the nearest relative. The chief was unique in that he was allowed as many as three wives, although typically his authority was exercised "unobtrusively". However, in times of war and in encounters with foreigners, the chief assumed great authority. This was evidenced by his distinctive ornaments, which included a large, white shell collar, a feather diadem, and a large belt of black beads and human teeth. After childbirth, a mother was confined for only one day, and children were raised in an atmosphere of love and affection. Boys were tattooed by women using thorns in a process completed at the age of 14. In this ritual, boys had a rectangle tattooed around their mouth, symbolizing that the boy could eat human flesh. Facial tattoos consisted of marks from each ear to the nose, chin, and mouth, while designs on the body displayed war and hunting accomplishments. Women were tattooed after marriage with a design consisting of a rectangle on the chin, with a band running to the ears. With the exception of the chief, the Apiaca were monogamous and married at the age of 14. Divorce was allowed, with custody of children going to the father in these cases. The dead were buried in shallow graves under their hammocks in the house, and their bones were exhumed after a year to be buried in the original grave.

The Apiaca fought and warred regularly with their neighbors, who included the Nambicuara, the Parintintin, the Tapanyuna, and others, for the purpose of avenging former issues. War expeditions of 200 to 300 warriors were embarked upon after the harvest, but only in the event of the shamans predicting victory. Several villages might cooperate under the leadership of a chief in times of war, and cannibalism – the eating of prisoners and those killed in battle – was practiced with elaborate ceremonies as late as 1848.

== Religion ==
The Apiaca believed in a god who created the sky and earth and who showed his anger and displeasure in the form of thunder and lightning. Shamans were greatly respected and told the future through trances and speaking with the spirits. They treated the ill by blowing on the patient, sucking the afflicted part of the body, and washing the patient in a herbal bath.
