= Trairão =

- Municipality
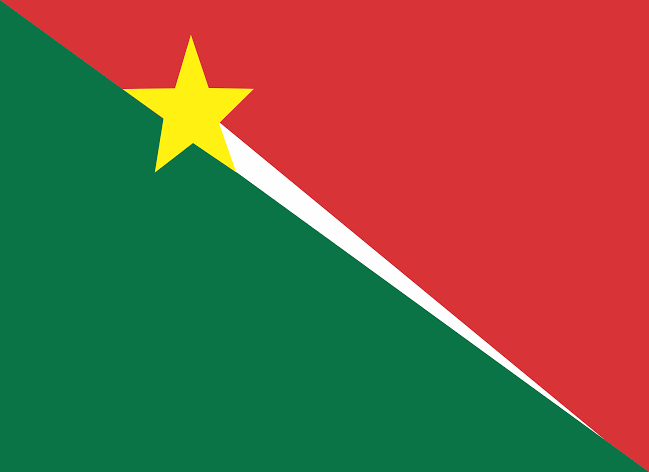
- Flag

- Location in Para

- Location in Brazil
- Coordinates: 4.57389°S 55.9439°W
- Country: Brazil
- Region: Northern
- State: Pará
- Mesoregion: Sudoeste Paraense

Population (2020)
  - Total: 19,168
- Time zone: UTC−3 (BRT)

Trairão is a municipality in the state of Pará in the Northern region of Brazil.

== Conservation ==
The municipality contains part of the Trairão National Forest, in which logging is permitted subject to a management plan. It contains part of the 724,965-hectare (1,791,430-acre) Altamira National Forest, a sustainable use conservation unit created in 1998. It contains part of the Itaituba I and Itaituba II national forests, both established in 1998, which have a combined area of 610,472-hectare (1,508,510-acre). It also contains part of the Jamanxim National Park, a fully protected area. The municipality contains a small portion of the 1,988,445-hectare (4,913,550-acre) Tapajós Environmental Protection Area, created in 2006.

The municipality contains part of the 178,173-hectare (440,280-acre) Sawré Muybu Indigenous Territory, recognized by Funai in April 2016.

== See also ==
- List of municipalities in Pará
