= Itaituba =

- City
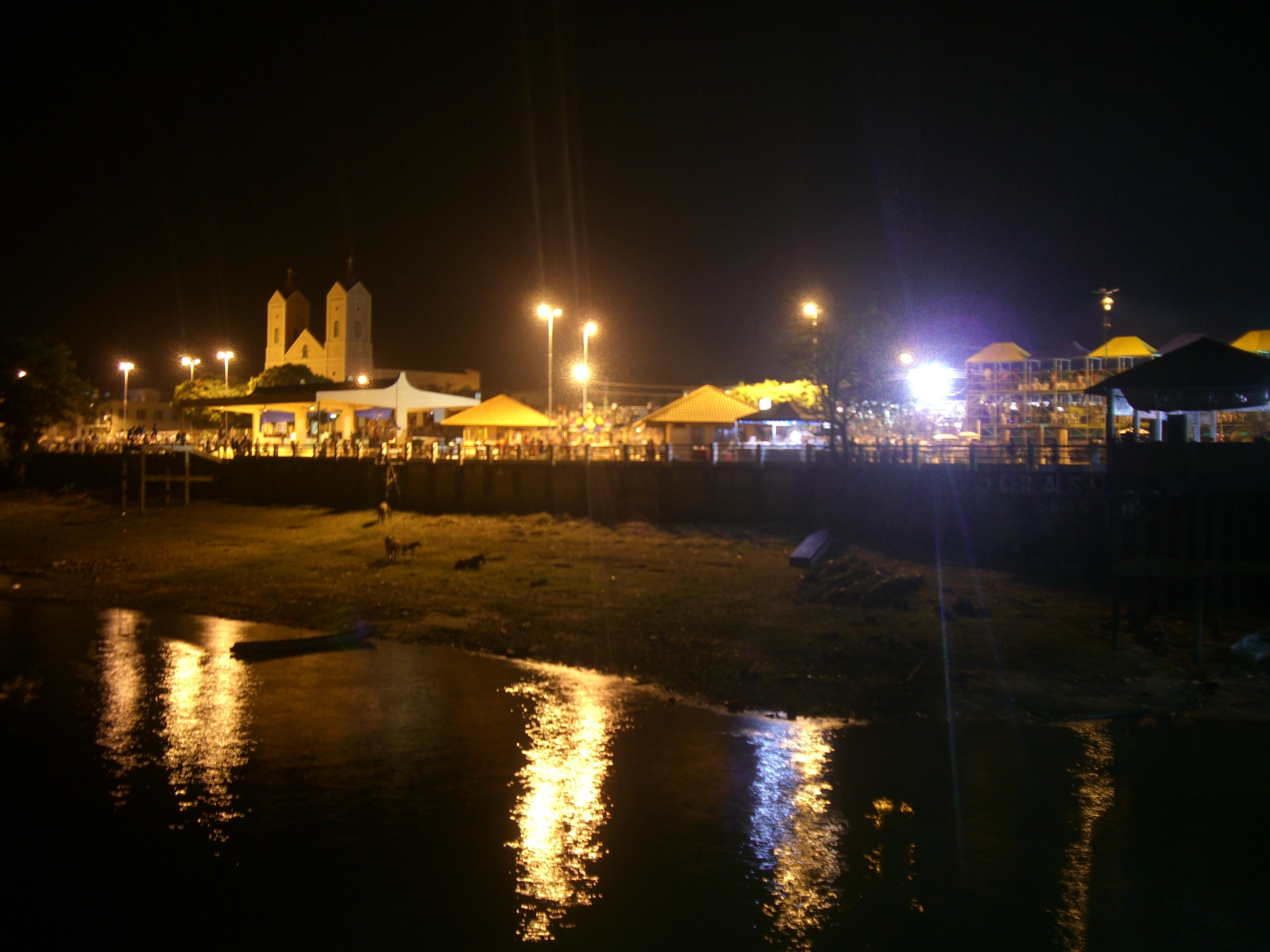

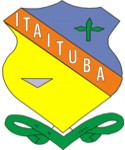
- Flag Coat of arms
- Nickname: "Golden City (Cidade Pepita, in Portuguese)"
- Location of Itaituba in the State of Pará, Brazil

- Location of Itaituba in Brazil
- Coordinates: 4°16′33″S 55°59′2″W
- Country: Brazil
- Region: North
- State: Pará (state, Brazil)
- Founded: December 15, 1856

Government
  - Mayor: Valmir Climaco (MDB)

Area
  - Total: 62,040.947 km^{2} (23,954.144 sq mi)
- Elevation: 15 m (49 ft)

Population (2022 Census)
  - Total: 123,314
  - Estimate (2025): 135,369
  - Density: 1.98762/km^{2} (5.14792/sq mi)
- Time zone: UTC−3 (BRT)
- Postal Code: 68180-000
- Area code: 93
- HDI (2000): 0.704 – medium
- Website: www.itaituba.pa.gov.br

Itaituba is a city and municipality located in the state of Pará, Brazil, and one of the most important socioeconomic centers in the western region of the State.

== Location ==
Itaituba is the fifteenth largest city (by population) in the State of Pará, third largest city in the western region, and has the thirteenth largest gross domestic product in the state. The city is regarded as a medium-sized city, and one of the fastest growing cities in the countryside of Brazil. The name of the city origins from Tupi (an indigenous language), which literally means gravel place.

People from the city of Itaituba are known as itaitubenses. The city nickname is cidade pepita, which translates as "gold nugget city." The city is known for the intense gold mining activity in the valley of the Tapajós River, the multitude of landscapes (such as the sandy river beaches that are formed during the dry seasons, and also the waterfalls located in the district of São Luiz do Tapajós), and the Amazônia National Park.

The municipality will contain part of the reservoir of the proposed Jatobá Hydroelectric Power Plant on the Tapajós.

== History ==
=== Early history ===
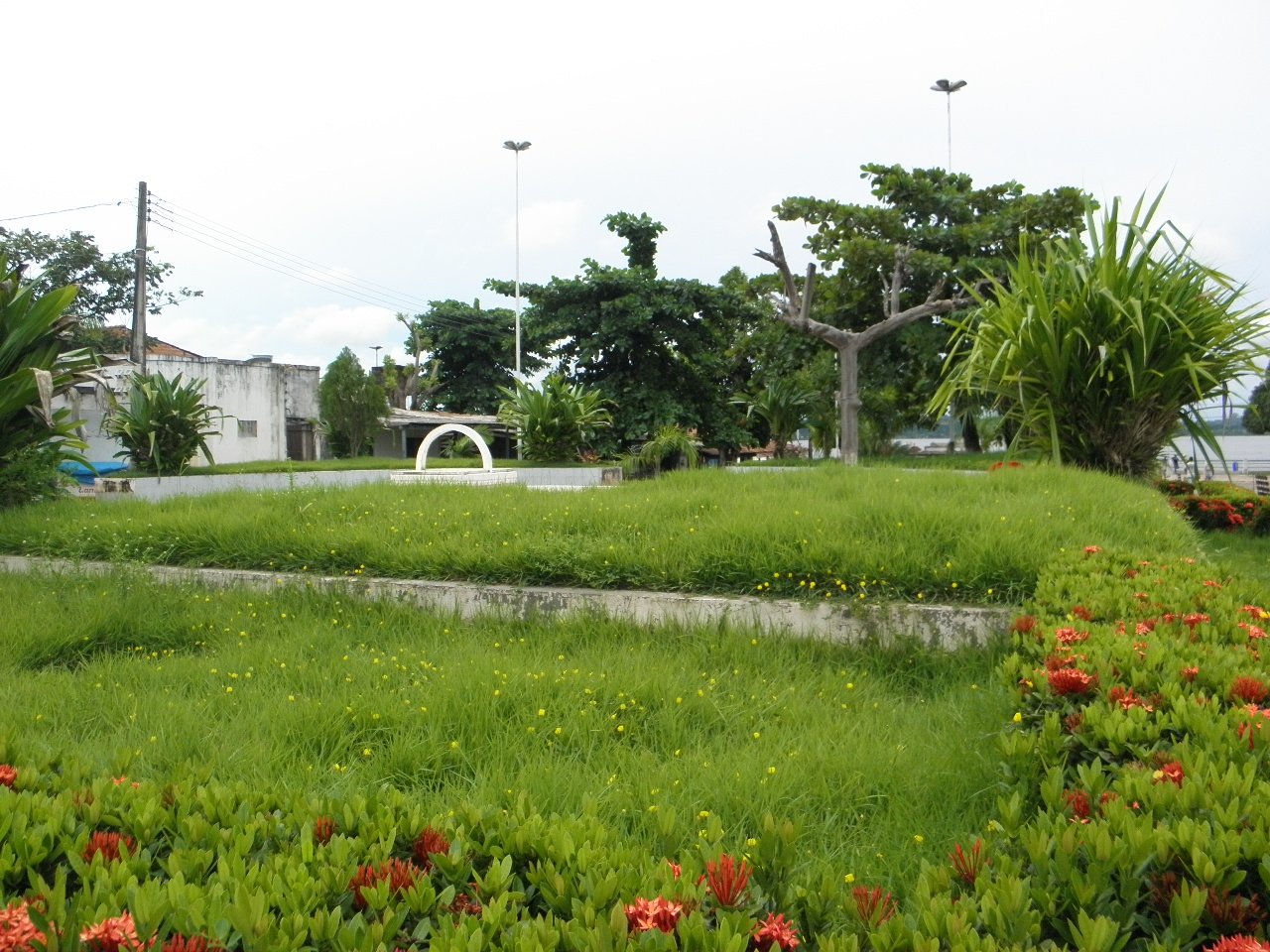
Praca do Centenário (Centenary Square), built for the celebration of the centenary of foundation of Itaituba.

The presence of Dutch, French, and English explorers in the estuary of the Amazon River has concurred for the settlement of Portuguese expeditionaries in the current territory of the State of Pará, and also for the expedition of Francisco Caldeira Castelo Branco which, in 1616, has founded the city of Belém.

After the foundation of the captaincy of Grão Pará, the foreigners were gradually expelled by the government, by means of various expeditions which had as goal to destroy the settlements created. Among these expeditions, the one headed by captain Pedro Teixeira reached for the first time (in 1626) the Tapajós River. This expedition established a friendly contact with native people in the site currently known as Alter-do-Chão bay. In 1639, Pedro Teixeira returned to the Tapajós River, being followed the Jesuits.

Several villages were founded by the Jesuits, along the Tapajós River, during this period. Some of these villages were "Tapajós", in 1661, "São José" (or Matapus), in 1722, "São Inácio" (or Tupinambaranas), in 1737, and Borari and Arapiuns.

During the administration of the governor and captain-general Francisco Xavier de Mendonça Furtado, the government retracted the Jesuits from these villages, and raised the Tapajós village to the category of town, with the denomination of Santarém. There were also changes in the villages of Borari and Arapiuns, in 1757, which were denominated Alter-do-Chão and Vila Franca, respectively. And, in 1758, the villages of São Inácio and São José were denominated as Boim and Pinhel.

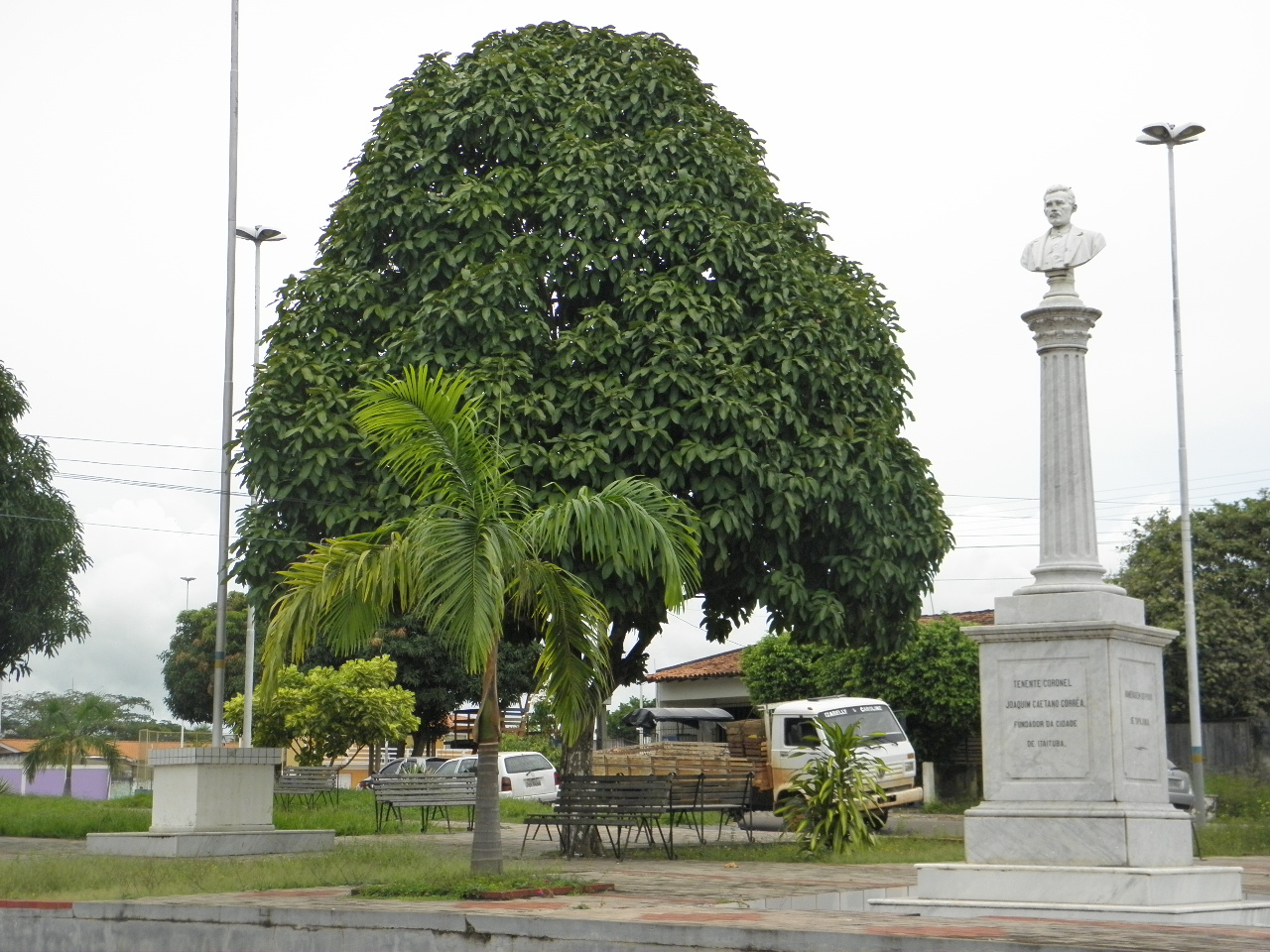
Praça da Bandeira (Flag's Square). In this photo, the decorative bust in honor to Joaquim Caetano Corrêa, founder of the municipally seat of Itaituba.

During the administration of José de Nápoles Telo de Menezes the village of Aveiro was founded. In this village was installed, in 1781, the parish of Our Lady of Conception (Nossa Senhora da Conceição).

It is known, from the footage and historical evidence available, that the place of Itaituba already existed by the year of 1812, since it was mentioned in the travel list of Miguel João de Castro alongside the Tapajós River, as a center of exploration and trade of specialties of the High Tapajós.

With the Revolution of Cabanagem and the events that occurred during this period, the village of Brasília Legal was founded, in 1836, as a place for resistance of the rebels, on the left bank of the Tapajós River.

According to Ferreira Penna, in 1836 Itaituba was an indigenous village, belonging to the province of Grão Pará, in which a small military base was installed.

Among the most relevant people associated to the foundation of Itaituba, one of remarkable importance is Joaquim Caetano Corrêa, because of its pioneer work on the exploration of the tapajonic region, being even regarded as the founder of the municipally seat.

Itaituba depended on the parish of Pinhel until 1853, when it was transferred to the jurisdiction of Boim.

== Geography ==
The city is located at latitude 04º16'34" S and longitude 55º59'01" W, on the left bank of the Tapajós River.

It contains part of the 2,382,000-hectare (5,890,000-acre) Mundurucu Indigenous Territory, established in 2004. The municipality also contains part of the 178,173-hectare (440,280-acre) Sawré Muybu Indigenous Territory, recognized by Funai in April 2016.

=== Conservation ===
The municipality contains part of the Trairão National Forest, in which logging is permitted subject to a management plan. It also contains part of the 724,965-hectare (1,791,430-acre) Altamira National Forest, a sustainable use conservation unit created in 1998. It contains part of the Itaituba I and Itaituba II national forests, both established in 1998, which have a combined area of 610,472 hectares (1,508,510 acres). It contains part of the Jamanxim National Park, a fully protected area. It also holds part of the 538,151-hectare (1,329,800-acre) Rio Novo National Park, a conservation unit created in 2006. It contains part of the Amaná National Forest, a 539,571-hectare (1,333,310-acre) sustainable use conservation unit created in 2006. The municipality contains 86% of the 1,988,445-hectare (4,913,550-acre) Tapajós Environmental Protection Area, created in 2006.

=== Climate ===
The climate of the region is equatorial, with an average minimum daily temperature greater than 18 °C. Itaituba has a relative humidity of the air above 80% during almost all the months of the year. The rainy season includes the months of December to April, while the driest months are from July to October.

Climate data for Itaituba (1991–2020)
Month	Jan	Feb	Mar	Apr	May	Jun	Jul	Aug	Sep	Oct	Nov	Dec	Year
Mean daily maximum °C (°F)	31.9 (89.4)	31.6 (88.9)	31.9 (89.4)	32.1 (89.8)	32.5 (90.5)	33.4 (92.1)	34.0 (93.2)	34.8 (94.6)	35.1 (95.2)	35.0 (95.0)	34.0 (93.2)	33.0 (91.4)	33.3 (91.9)
Daily mean °C (°F)	26.9 (80.4)	26.7 (80.1)	26.8 (80.2)	27.0 (80.6)	27.2 (81.0)	27.4 (81.3)	27.5 (81.5)	28.2 (82.8)	28.7 (83.7)	28.7 (83.7)	28.3 (82.9)	27.8 (82.0)	27.6 (81.7)
Mean daily minimum °C (°F)	23.6 (74.5)	23.5 (74.3)	23.6 (74.5)	23.8 (74.8)	23.8 (74.8)	23.3 (73.9)	22.8 (73.0)	23.3 (73.9)	24.0 (75.2)	24.2 (75.6)	24.2 (75.6)	24.1 (75.4)	23.7 (74.7)
Average precipitation mm (inches)	254.8 (10.03)	313.6 (12.35)	345.6 (13.61)	272.6 (10.73)	209.9 (8.26)	99.0 (3.90)	67.8 (2.67)	53.5 (2.11)	72.7 (2.86)	112.8 (4.44)	148.2 (5.83)	178.8 (7.04)	2,129.3 (83.83)
Average precipitation days (≥ 1.0 mm)	16	18	19	17	16	11	8	6	6	8	9	11	145
Average relative humidity (%)	87.9	89.0	88.8	88.7	88.8	86.8	84.1	81.1	80.1	80.2	83.2	85.1	85.3
Source: Instituto Nacional de Meteorologia

== Culture ==
The biggest festival in Itaituba is Our lady de Santana's Party, for padroeira of the municipal district. The festivities are during the first fortnight of July and finish with Círio's Procession, on the 26th of July, dedicated to that holy.

== Transportation ==
The city is served by Itaituba Airport.

== See also ==
- List of municipalities in Pará
