= Amazônia National Park =

National park in Pará, Brazil

- Parque Nacional da Amazônia
- IUCN category II (national park)
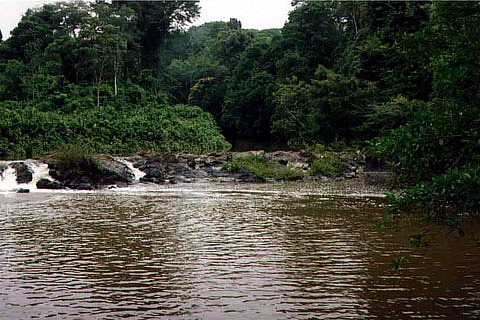
- Park in May 2014

- Location within Brazil
- Location: Pará, Brazil
- Coordinates: 4°26′22″S 56°50′25″W
- Area: 1,070,737 hectares (2,645,850 acres)
- Designation: National park
- Established: 1974
- Governing body: Instituto Chico Mendes de Conservação da Biodiversidade

The Amazônia National Park (Portuguese: Parque Nacional da Amazônia) was created in 1974, as a national park comprising 1,070,737 ha. It is situated in Itaituba and Trairão municipalities, Pará state, in the north region of Brazil. It is located in the watershed of the Tapajós River, about halfway between Manaus and Belém. It has expanded since its inception and now covers 8,600 square kilometres (3,300 mi^{2}). It is a very biodiverse habitat and contains a wide range of animals and plants. The specific objectives of the park are the preservation of various Amazonic ecosystems, through scientific, educational and recreational means.

== Geography ==
The park lies on either side of the Tapajós River. The habitat is dense lowland rain forest and there are areas of white-sand grasslands beside the upper reaches of the Tapajós. This river rises in the Precambrian crystalline shields area of ancient igneous rock and carries little sediment. The river acts as a barrier so that some of the animals and plants on one bank are not found on the other. The first base in the park is about 53 km (33 mi) from Itaituba, and there is some illegal cutting of timber and gold mining in the eastern parts closest to Itaituba and Trairão. To the west the park adjoins the 827,877 hectares (2,045,730 acres) Pau-Rosa National Forest, created in 2001. The proposed South Amazon Ecological Corridor would link the park to other protected areas and indigenous territories in the region.

== History ==
The Amazônia National Park was created by federal decree 73.683 of 19 February 1974. Its limits were altered by decree on 18 January 1985. The management plan was published on 31 December 1988, but was not made official at that time. The consultative council was created on 26 November 2004. The limits of the park were altered on 13 February 2006 and again on 12 August 2011. Law 12678 of 25 June 2012 amended the limits of the Amazônia, Campos Amazônicos and Mapinguari national parks, the Itaituba I, Itaituba II and Crepori national forests and the Tapajós Environmental Protection Area. All of these were reduced in size except the Campos Amazônicos. This last alteration reduced the area of the park to 1,070,737 hectares (2,645,850 acres).

== Flora and fauna ==
Except for about 2% of more open forest, the whole park consists of dense humid tropical forest. The larger trees reach a height of about 50 m (160 ft), and the light filtering through the canopy is sufficient to produce a biodiverse understorey of vines, lichens, mosses and orchids. Many of the mammals in the park are nocturnal, and some such as the giant otter, Amazonian manatee and giant anteater are endangered. There are also large numbers of reptiles, fish and other aquatic creatures.

== Visiting the park ==
The park can be reached from the city of Itaituba. The Transpantaneira runs from east to west through the park but does not really live up to its name. The road is paved as far as Itaituba but other parts are unpaved earth roads topped with gravel that deteriorate during the rainy season, November to April, and need much repair work each May and June. The park can be accessed from Santarém, Pará, which is at the confluence of the Tapajós with the Amazon River. Santarém has an airport. Any roads usually require four-wheel-drive vehicles and river transport is normally used in this region.

== Sources ==
- "Amazonia National Park", Encyclopædia Britannica, Encyclopædia Britannica
- Ayres, José Márcio; Da Fonseca, Gustavo A. B.; Rylands, Anthony B.; Queiroz, Helder L.; Pinto, Luiz Paulo; Masterson, Donald; Cavalcanti, Roberto B. (2005), Os Corredores Ecológicos das Florestas Tropicais do Brasil (PDF) (in Portuguese), Sociedade Civil Mamirauá, archived from the original (PDF) on 2016-07-31
- Branford, Sue (1 October 1980), "From Nothing to Nowhere: The Transamazonian Highway", New Internationalist
- FLONA de Pau-Rosa (in Portuguese), ISA: Instituto Socioambiental
- "Parna da Amazônia" (in Portuguese). ISA: Instituto Socioambiental.
- PARNA dos Campos Amazônicos (in Portuguese), ISA: Instituto Socioambiental
- Sears, Robin, Central Amazonia in Brazil and parts of Bolivia, WWF
- Waggoner, John (2014), The Amazon of Brazil, Hunter Publishing, Inc, ISBN 978-1-58843-793-8
