= Jamanxim National Park =

National park in Pará, Brazil

- Parque Nacional do Jamanxim
- IUCN category II (national park)
- Location within Brazil
- Nearest city: Itaituba, Pará
- Coordinates: 5°39′29″S 55°42′11″W
- Area: 859,797 hectares (2,124,600 acres)
- Designation: National park
- Created: 13 February 2006
- Administrator: ICMBio

The Jamanxim National Park (Portuguese: Parque Nacional do Jamanxim) is a national park in the state of Pará, Brazil.

== Location ==
Sketch map of Tapajos basin conservation units: 14. Jamanxim National Park

The Jamanxim National Park covers 859,797 hectares (2,124,600 acres) of Amazon rainforest. It is in parts of the municipalities of Altamira, Itaituba and Trairão in the state of Pará. The Trairão National Forest lies to the north.

The park mostly lies in the Jamanxim-Xingu depression, with relatively flat terrain ranging from 100 to 200 metres (330 to 660 ft) in altitude. The Southern Pará plateau rises to 200 to 300 metres (660 to 980 ft). Two small areas of the Tapajós Plateau in the west contain hills rising from 100 to 400 metres (330 to 1,310 ft). The park contains the sub-basins of the Jamanxim, Tocantins and Aruri rivers within the Tapajós basin. It also holds very small parts of the Ratão and Iriri basins. Average annual rainfall is 2,228 millimetres (87.7 in). Temperatures range from 24 to 33 °C (75 to 91 °F) with an average of 28 °C (82 °F).

Vegetation includes open rainforest with vines and palms trees, dense submontane rainforest with emergent canopy and dense alluvial rainforest with uniform canopy. The trees include species with high timber value that are subject to intense exploitation pressure and are important for conservation of Amazonian biodiversity. They include species such as Hymenaea courbaril, Cedrela odorata, Manilkara huberi, Dipteryx odorata, Dinizia excelsa, Handroanthus impetiginosus, Minquartia guianensis and Copaifera reticulata. Species with value other than timber include Aspidosperma carapanauba, Carapa guianensis and Brazil nut (Bertholletia excelsa).

== Conservation ==
The park is classified as IUCN protected area category II (national park), so has the purpose of preserving natural ecosystems of great ecological relevance and scenic beauty, enabling the conduct of scientific research, development of educational activities and environmental interpretation, and supporting recreation in contact with nature and ecological tourism. It was created by decree on 13 February 2006, and is administered by the Chico Mendes Institute for Biodiversity Conservation (ICMBio). The conservation unit is supported by the Amazon Region Protected Areas Program. Protected species in the park include the jaguar (Panthera onca) and giant otter (Pteronura brasiliensis).

== Sources ==
- Full list: PAs supported by ARPA, ARPA
- Parque Nacional do Jamanxim (in Portuguese), Chico Mendes Institute for Biodiversity Conservation, archived from the original on 2021-03-02
- Plano de Manejo da Floresta Nacional do Trairão, Localizada no Estado do Pará (PDF), Brasília – DF: ICMBio, archived from the original (PDF) on 2017-02-11
- Unidade de Conservação: Parque Nacional do Jamanxim (in Portuguese), MMA: Ministério do Meio Ambiente, archived from the original on March 14, 2022
