= National forest (Brazil) =

Type of protected area in Brazil

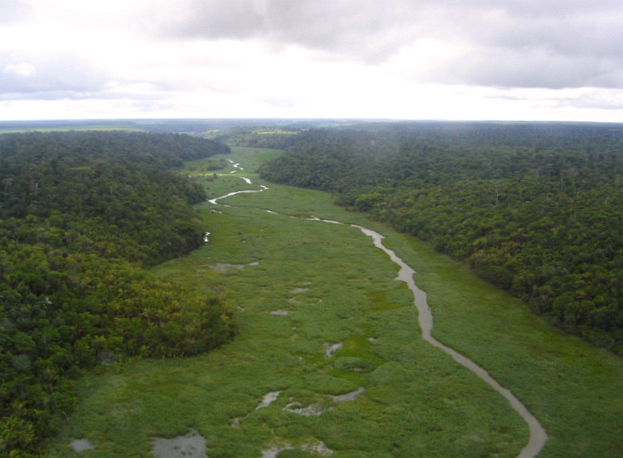
Rio Preto National Forest

A national forest (Portuguese: Floresta Nacional, FLONA) in Brazil is a type of sustainable use protected area. The primary purpose is sustainable exploitation of the forest, subject to various limits. These include a requirement to preserve at least 50% of the original forest, to preserve forest along watercourses and on steep slopes, and so on. More than 10% of the Amazon rainforest is protected by national forests or other types of conservation unit.

== Definition ==
The concept of the National Forest originated with the 1934 Forest Code. It is an area with forest cover of predominantly native species and has the basic objective of the sustainable multiple use of forest resources and scientific research, with emphasis on methods for sustainable exploitation of native forests. The forest is publicly owned, and any private lands in its boundaries are expropriated when it is formed. Indigenous populations may remain in the forest. Public visits are allowed, and research is encouraged, subject to the rules set out by the responsible agency. The term "national forest" is replaced by the equivalent terms "state forest" and "municipal forest" when it is created by the lower administrative level. The responsible agency must prepare and publish a management plan for the forest.

== Conservation ==
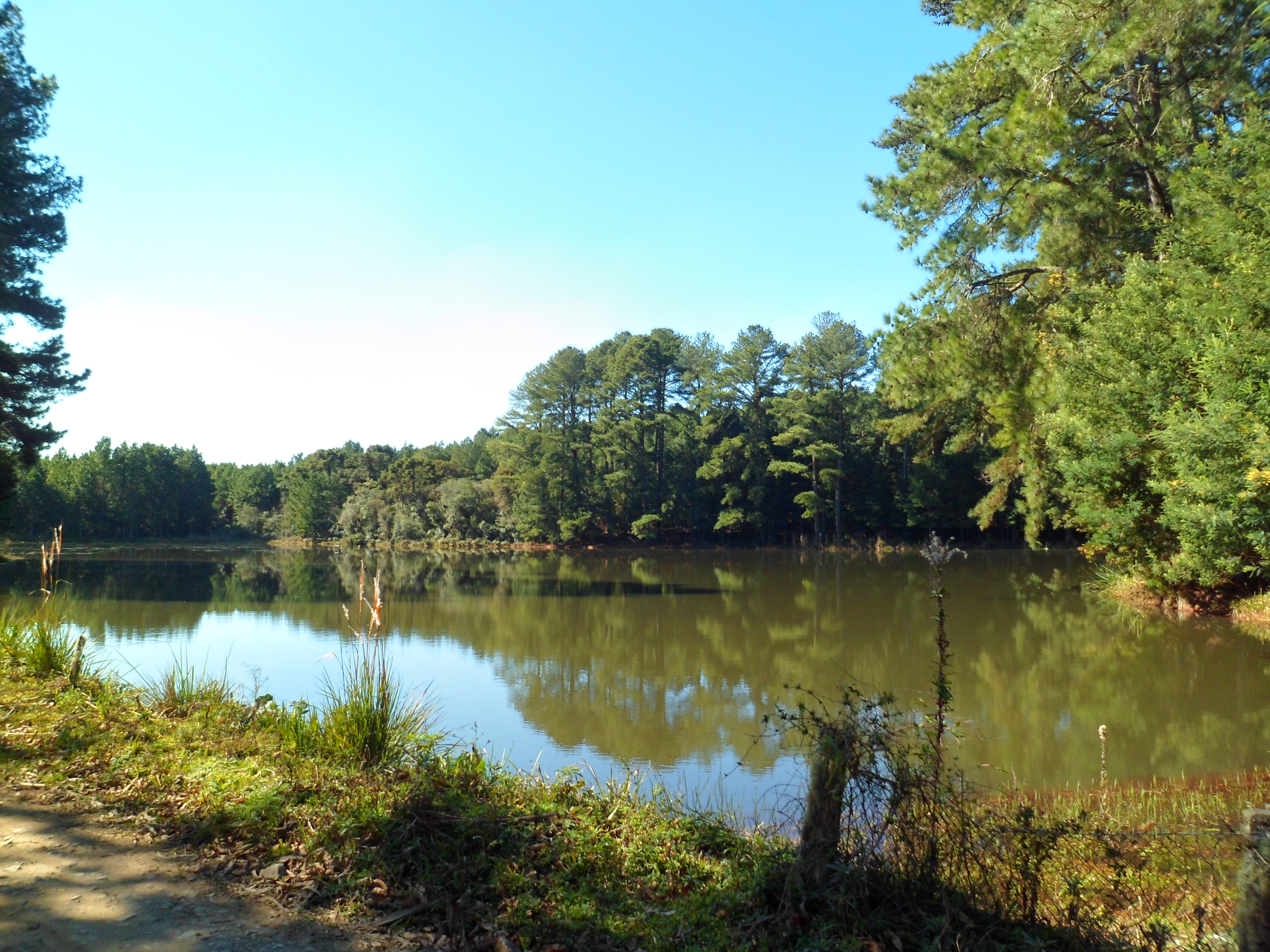
São Francisco de Paula National Forest

Under the Forest Code any new national forests must maintain at least 50% of the original forest coverage, although older forests may have as little as 20%. Properties in the south of Brazil in which the Paraná pine (Araucaria angustifolia) occurs cannot be deforested. Areas with slopes between 24 and 45 degrees cannot be deforested, but lumber may be extracted without clearcutting. Forests along waterways and around springs, on topographical heights, on slopes of more than 45 degrees, in salt marshes, on the edge of plateaus and above 1,800 metres (5,900 ft) may not be touched. The minimum amount of wild coverage must be preserved at each level of the property. Industries that use forest products are expected to invest in forests to meet their needs.

Financial incentives envisioned in the Forest Code including tax exemptions on forest income and tax incentives for reforestation have not been implemented or have been substantially modified. The regulations prohibit trade in wildlife products and by-products including 14 plants species and 207 species of animal. These include the black caiman, manatee, jaguar, marsh deer, giant otter, macaw and giant anteater. However, enforcement has been hampered by lack of personnel, there is pressure from poor people who need the resources for survival, and tropical plants and animals fetch high prices in the international market.

== Amazonia ==
Seven new national forests were created in the Amazon by presidential decree of Fernando Henrique Cardoso on 2 February 1998. According to the Socio-Environmental Institute (ISA) this did not increase the protected area of the Amazon since the forests had previously been military areas protected from predatory exploitation, or the perimeter of the Carajás Project, the mining area of the Companhia Vale do Rio Doce (CVRD). However, the decrees did let the government claim that 10% of the Amazon forests were protected. According to Paulo Benincá of IBAMA the chosen areas had high potential for logging and were close to major rivers to transport. The goal was to create 40,000,000 hectares (99,000,000 acres) of national forest, which would be sufficient to meet domestic and foreign demand for wood products. The 700,000 hectares (1,700,000 acres) Carajás National Forest around the Carajás project would ensure financial partnership with CVRD for environmental projects.

== See also ==
- List of Brazilian National Forests

== Sources ==
- Decreto Nº 4.340, de 22 de Agosto de 2002, Presidência da República - Casa Civil - Subchefia para Assuntos Jurídicos, August 22, 2002
- "Floresta Nacionais", Amazônia Legal (in Portuguese)
- LEI No 9.985, DE 18 DE JULHO DE 2000, Presidência da República - Casa Civil- Subchefia para Assuntos Jurídicos, 18 July 2000
- O que são Unidades de Conservação (in Portuguese), ((o))eco, 19 April 2013
