= Chico Mendes Institute for Biodiversity Conservation =

Brazilian environmental organization

- Instituto Chico Mendes de Conservação da Biodiversidade
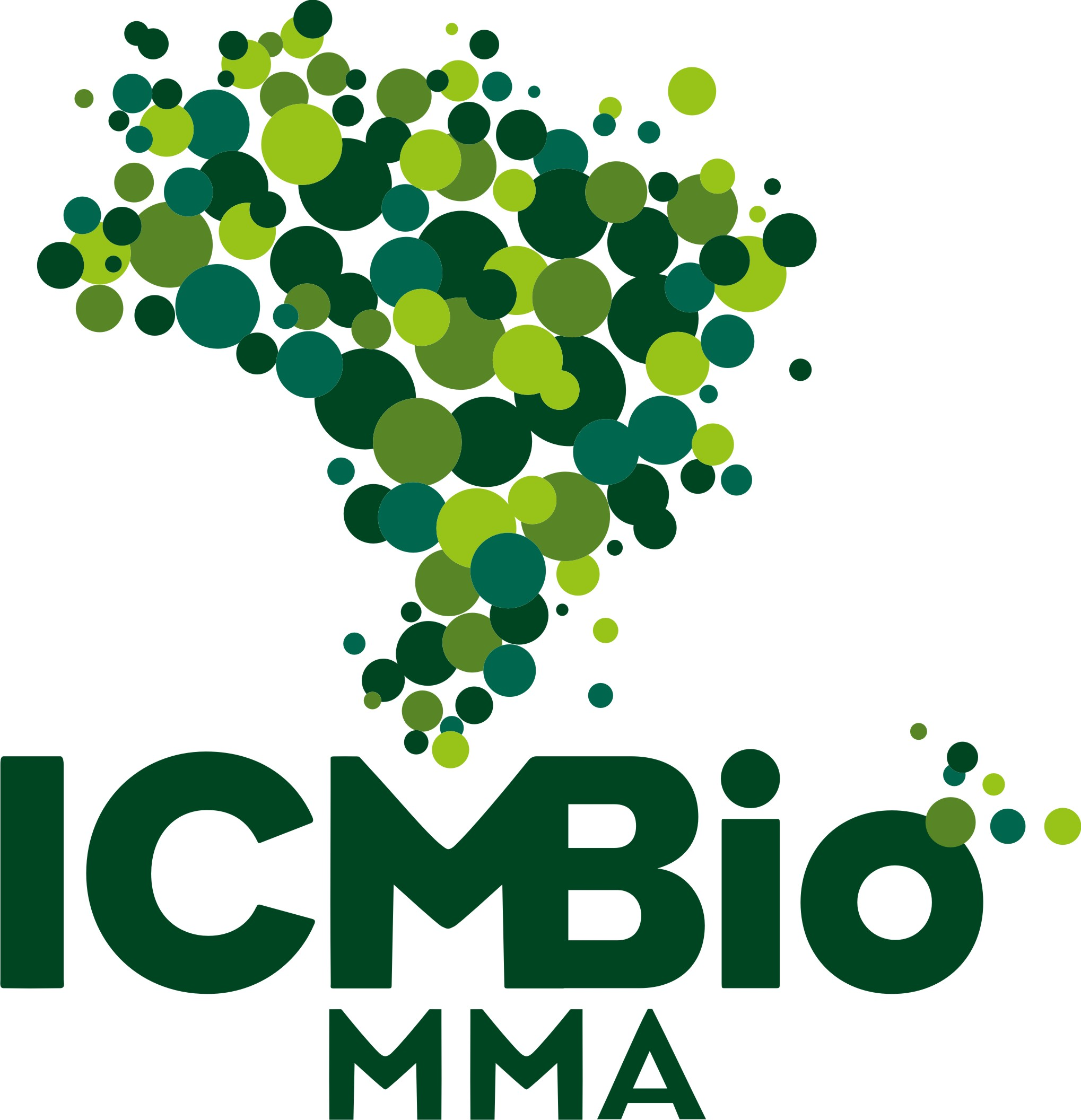

Agency overview
- Formed: August 28, 2007
- Jurisdiction: Federal government of Brazil
- Headquarters: Brasília, Distrito Federal, Brazil
- Parent agency: Ministério do Meio Ambiente
- Website: www.gov.br/icmbio/

The Chico Mendes Institute for Biodiversity Conservation (Portuguese: Instituto Chico Mendes de Conservação da Biodiversidade, ICMBio) is a government agency under the administration of the Brazilian Ministry of the Environment. It is named after the environmental activist Chico Mendes. Its function is to protect, manage, and administrate protected areas within the country's territory. ICMBio is headquartered in Brasília.
