= Parakanã people =

Brazilian Indigenous people

The Parakanã people are a group of about 1,300 people speaking a Tupi-Guarani language who are Indigenous to a small region in Brazil between Pacajá and Tocantins. They practice slash-and-burn agriculture, with a small number of crops. Their staple crop is bitter manioc. Like other Amerindians in the region, they hunt large mammals.

== History ==
The state of Pará, Brazil, where the Parakanã live

Towards the end of the 19th century, the Parakanã people divided themselves into two distinct population blocs: Eastern and Western. This occurred as a result of a woman being captured during a raid, causing extreme conflict. The Eastern Parakanã settled in the upper areas of the Pucuruí, Bacuri, and da Direita rivers, while the Western Parakanã decided to migrate northwest, most likely near the Jacaré and Pacajazinho-Arataú rivers. These two blocs have since become very divergent types of groups with the Parakanã people. The Western Parakanã utilized nomadic strategies within the interior of the forests, as they stopped horticulture and increased their aggression as well as their relationships with other populations of the region. Meanwhile, the Eastern Parakanã remained much more defensive in nature and implemented a more sedentary lifestyle, keeping their contact with other populations to a minimum.

It was in 1910 that the Parakanã were first seen along the Pacajá, just upriver from a town known as Portel. They were first identified as the group who located themselves between the lower portion of the Pucuruí River and the town of Alcobaça where they ransacked the workers and colonists of the Tocantins Railroad. Ultimately, the Indian Protection Service created a Pacification Post on the railroad to ensure the safety of the workers due to the danger the Parakanã were causing to these people.

=== Contact ===
The Parakanã were first spotted in 1910 along the Pacajá. However, it was not until the 1920s were the Parakanã tribe identified as being the Amerindians who lived between the town of Alcobaca and the lower part of the Pucurui River. Finally in 1928, the Servico de Protecao aos Indio, also known as the Indian Protection Service, built the Pacification Post on the 67th kilometer of the Tocantins Railroad. This post, set on the left bank of Pucurui River, was to protect and provide safety to the representatives throughout the pacification with the Parakanã.

Until 1938, the Western Parakanã regularly visited the post to acquire western goods and develop a peaceful relationship with the Toria. However, after a rise in violent conflict with other Amerindian groups, the Western Parakanã stopped visiting the post. Since then, there has been a rise in warfare within the area between the Western and Eastern blocs.

==== Western Parakanã ====
Until 1938, the Western Parakanã regularly visited the post to acquire western goods and develop a peaceful relationship with the Toria. However, after a rise in violent conflict with other Amerindian groups, the Western Parakanã stopped visiting the post. Since then, there has been a rise in warfare within the area between the Western and Eastern blocs.

Throughout the 1960s, the Western Parakanã monopolized the Pucurui Post. They remained autonomous however would frequently visit the post to exchange with western merchants. Towards the end of the 1960s, the economic front began to reach the groups previously preserved territory that were previously motivated by lumber and mineral trade. The long-term trade relationship had reached its climax and the groups steadily began to mobilize away from traditional forms of villages.

In May 1972, the Funai were called after individuals from the Western Parakanã bloc were spotted ransacking gardens of colonists. They began preliminary discussions with the group before withdrawing due to lack of support and gifts from the government. The following year, the Western bloc began heading southwest towards the upper part of the Cajàzeira River. However, they quickly headed west after a man was killed by the local village. Throughout the migration, the group disputed over women and separated, going different directions. The Akaria group arrived at their destination in 1975. By 1976, their campsite coincided with the 377th kilometer of the Transamazonian road and the group was transferred to the Pucurui Post. At the time of contact, the bloc had over forty people. By the time they settled at the Post, less than 30 still survived.

The other majority of the Western Parakanã group headed west toward the Xingu-Bacaja. They were met with the Araweté, or the Yrywijara, a rival tribe. For two years, the tribes fought three large-scale wars before the Funai settled the disputes and moved the Arawete to the Ipixuna Post in 1977. The Western Parakanã finally settled further south in the basin of Sao Jose Stream. From 1980 to 1990 the group ransacked farms in the area. The Funai were sent to settle disputes and establish contact.

==== Eastern Parakanã ====
In the late 1950s, the Eastern Parakanã bloc began its migration from the Da Direita River northwards towards the upper course of the Andorinha River. For decades the group fought for their autonomy. Throughout the Brazilian rubber and nut boom and the railway project that connected Tucurui and Maraba, the tribe were able to maintain their autonomy and preserve their land. The Eastern Parakanã bloc never knew of the Pacification Post's existence. Since they were located in the middle and upper part of the Pucurui river, their relationship with the outside consisted of Bracilian nut gatherers, rubber tappers, and jaguar pelt hunters that often ventured into the

On November 12, 1970, by the Lontra River, the Eastern Parakanã tried to drive the Funai away. However were succumbed by the gifts brought by the Funai and retreated to the Front's campsite. Unfortunately, this led to severe depopulation from contact with the foreigners that resulted in high mortality rates. The bloc was exposed to many diseases including blepharitis, polio, and hepatitis.

== Cultural practices ==
When it comes to social organization of the Parakanã people, the Eastern and Western Parakanã take differing approaches. The Eastern Parakanã separate themselves exogamous patri-groups, otherwise known as groups traced through the paternal familial line that do not marry within their own social group. The layout of the houses in the Eastern Parakanã village also are represented by these patri-groups. Typically, the houses are occupied by simply a nuclear family, however, some houses consisted of multiple couples. Conversely, the Western Parakanã villages are arranged through virilocal and patrilineal reason.

The Parakanã are known for their elaborate music and dance rituals as well. Four of these routines are the most well-known, as they require an intense amount of preparation and development. They are called the Clarinet Feast, the Cigar Feast, the Feast of the Rhythmic Baton, and the Beer Feast. These four rituals occur in company with a series of small feasts connected to the hunt of particular animals, or they occur with the collection of wild honey. The sole crop that is implemented in these feasts is tobacco, which is put on the inside of a cigar that is made from the inner bark of the tauari or the ‘tree of smoke.’

Agriculturally, the Western Parakanã abandoned the practice of horticulture in the early 1960s and only lived by hunting and gathering, while also raiding other populations' garden products. Meanwhile, after the ‘pacification’ horticulture was reintroduced to the Parakanã by the Funai employees and large collective gardens were introduced through the guidance of the Post chief. The gardens were used to grow rice, beans, banana, manioc, and maize. All of the labor was left to the men of the Parakanã including cutting trees, burning, planting and harvesting, sowing, and cutting undergrowth. Particularly within the Western Parakanã, men were a vital component of the group as they adopted the majority of the agricultural tasks and took an active part in the processing of manioc. In regards to the Eastern Parakanã, the garden labor is divided among family ties within each group. Therefore, their agricultural work consists of the organization of female labor through marriage in accordance with the cooperation of the males through patrilineal ties.

== Shamanism ==
The practice of shamanism has been noted by anthropologists to be an integral part of Parakanã culture. Unlike other Amazonian tribes, the Parakanã frequently practice shamanism in tandem with warfare. The specific structure and practice of their shamanism deviates from the modern Western perception as no individual is called a shaman. As there is a negative association of shamanism with witchcraft, the term dreamer is used to refer to the individual.

In Parakanã shamanism, there is both a master (jara) and a pet (te’omawa). The practice occurs within the dreams of the jara, the dreamer, and the te’omawa, the dreamed. In most situations, the te’omawa is from an enemy village of the jara. Through dreams, the te’omawa can be tamed by the jara and is no longer believed to be an enemy. Although the jara possesses control over his te’omawa through his dreams, the latter is believed to have healing properties. Following the dreams, either the jara or the te’omawa will visit the other's village and are greeted with a warm reception.

There are also ritualistic and symbolic aspects of the practice. Originally created as a festival related to warfare, the tobacco festival opetymoi develops a male's capacity to dream of their enemy known as jawara, or the jaguar. Similar to the concept of the master (jara) and the pet (te’omawa), there is the jawajara (the master of the jaguar) and the jawara (the jaguar).

=== Additional beliefs ===
Although there is the practice of the master and the pet, as previously described, the Parakanã also hold the belief that white individuals and white-to-be are shamans and have the power to heal. This stems from a long-held tradition that white individuals are immortal and can bring the dead back to life through revitalization: a ritualistic practice of smoking and dancing around the deceased's grave.

Another origin of the association with white individuals and shamanism have been constructed by Brazilian historians. The historians believe this belief held by the Parakanã comes from the age of European colonialism and conquest in Latin America. The Parakanã and other Brazilian indigenous groups developed the term Caraíba to refer to shamans who were seen as god-like people that they interacted with. The Caraíba spoke of an abundant, eternal life and cured Parakanã villagers.

The perception presented by Brazilian historians of European colonizers and missionaries as god-like to the Parakanã have not been without challenge. Gananath Obeyeseke, professor emeritus of Anthropology at Princeton University, pushed back on the myth and argued that it perpetuated the domination of the European narrative in history.

== Relationship with the Brazilian government ==
Brazil's new 1988 Constitution gave special emphasis to protecting the human rights of indigenous people. Article 231 recognized both the cultural and territorial rights of indigenous groups based on their traditional heritage. This constitution formally protects groups from invasion of their territories. Article 67 ordered all indigenous territories to be demarcated in five years. However, a decade later, only half of the territories have been formally demarcated. In 1996, President Cardoso signed #1775 which allowed groups to appeal the claim to access of indigenous lands, allowing commercial interests to claim these lands.

=== Today ===
Today, the Parakanã live in the last repositories of woods and other natural resources. Frequent contact with illegal loggers have caused a rise in exposure of dependency, alcoholism, and exploitation of Parakanã's youth. While the Brazilian government has put into place a federal decree to impose strict logging restrictions, the Amazon is too vast to actually enforce anything. The Parakanã have helped illegal woodcutters locate stands of Mahogany in exchange for firearms, food, and alcohol. On the other hand, they have also helped the Funai and other federal agencies curb invasions and exploitation of the Amazon. In 1993, they helped destroy machines and tools used by the Perachi timber company.
