= Nascentes da Serra do Cachimbo Biological Reserve =

Biological reserve in Pará, Brazil

- Reserva Biológica Nascentes da Serra do Cachimbo
- IUCN category Ia (strict nature reserve)
- Location within Brazil
- Nearest city: Alta Floresta, Mato Grosso
- Coordinates: 9°00′47″S 54°41′10″W
- Area: 342,192 hectares (845,570 acres)
- Designation: Biological reserve
- Created: 20 May 2005
- Administrator: Chico Mendes Institute for Biodiversity Conservation

The Nascentes da Serra do Cachimbo Biological Reserve (Portuguese: Reserva Biológica Nascentes da Serra do Cachimbo) is a biological reserve in the state of Pará, Brazil. The reserve protects an area in the transition between the Cerrado and Amazon biomes, supporting highly diverse flora and fauna including many endemic species. It is accessible via the BR-163 highway, and is among the federal conservation units in the Amazon Legal that has suffered most from deforestation.

== Location ==
The Nascentes da Serra do Cachimbo Biological Reserve has an area of 342,192 hectares (845,570 acres). The reserve covers parts of the municipalities of Altamira and Novo Progresso in the state of Pará. The reserve is adjacent to the BR-163 highway and abuts the Panará and Menkragnoti indigenous territories.

The Serra do Cachimbo complex is partly a continuous mass of mountains with a south west alignment, partly plateau with flat-bottomed valleys. Altitude ranges from 250 to 740 metres (820 to 2,430 ft) above sea level. Erosion has created ridges and ravines. In the northern part there are escarpments along the transition to the peripheral depression of southern Pará, where the rivers descend in rapids and waterfalls such as the Salto do Curuá.

Springs in the reserve form the Cristalino and São Bento rivers, which are in the Tapajós basin. The Água Fria, Flecha, Nilana, Ipiranga, Xixé, Curuaés, Curuá and Iriri rivers are headwaters of the Xingu River. About 11% of the reserve is in the Tapajós basin and the remainder in the Xingu basin.

== Environment ==
The Nascentes da Serra do Cachimbo Biological Reserve is in the Amazon biome. Average annual rainfall is 2,000 millimetres (79 in). Temperatures vary from 18 to 35 °C (64 to 95 °F) with an average of 22 °C (72 °F). The reserve is in a transition region between the Amazon and the Cerrado. In the north the climate is humid tropical, with high temperature and rainfall throughout the year. In the south the climate is tropical, with a dry season. There is a wide range of plant species of sub-montane dense and open rainforest, seasonal and alluvial forest and extensive open areas of Campinarana, besides patches of Rupestre and Buritizais vegetation.

=== Mammals ===
Endangered carnivores include the giant otter (Pteronura brasiliensis), ocelot (Leopardus pardalis), oncilla (Leopardus tigrinus), margay (Leopardus wiedii) and jaguar (Panthera onca). Other endangered species include the giant anteater (Myrmecophaga tridactyla), giant armadillo (Priodontes maximus) and the regionally endemic white-cheeked spider monkey (Ateles marginatus), which is protected.

=== Herpetofauna ===
The reserve has typical amphibians of the Amazon rainforest including the South American common toad (Rhinella margaritifera), the gladiator frog Hyla wavrini and the Manaus slender-legged tree frog (Osteocephalus taurinus). The frogs Dendropsophus melanargyreus and Pseudopaludicola mystacalis, more common in the cerrado, are also found. Reptiles include typical Amazon species such as the gecko Gonatodes eladioi, the lizards Bachia flavescens and Anolis punctatus, false coral snake (Anilius scytale), pit viper Bothriopsis taeniata, emerald tree boa (Corallus caninus) and Xenoxybelis argenteus. Regionally endemic species include five species of frog including Rhinella castaneotica, Brazil-nut poison frog (Adelphobates castaneoticus) and Hyla anataliasiasi, two caecilians (Nectocaecilia ladigesi and Typhlonectes obesus and seven lizards including Arthrosaura kockii, striped forest whiptail (Kentropyx calcarata) and Leposoma guianense.

=== Birds ===
The varied relief and flora support a very diverse bird population and favour endemism. The white-banded mockingbird (Mimus triurus) passes through the reserve from June to August. 409 species are known to occur in the reserve including the threatened hyacinth macaw (Anodorhynchus hyacinthinus), Chaco eagle (Buteogallus coronatus), red-necked aracari (Pteroglossus bitorquatus) and blue-winged macaw (Primolius maracana). There are 22 regionally endemic species including red-throated piping guan (Pipile cujubi), snow-capped manakin (Lepidothrix nattereri) and masked tanager (Tangara nigrocincta). Rare species include the Tapajós hermit (Phaethornis aethopygus), bald parrot (Pyrilia aurantiocephala) and the chorozinho-do-cachimbo, a recently discovered species of Herpsilochmus.

== Conservation ==
The reserve maintains large blocks of native vegetation in the deforestation arc along the BR-163 highway. It was considered a priority among the first proposals for large scale conservation in the Amazon. The Nascentes da Serra do Cachimbo Biological Reserve was created by decree on 20 May 2005. The reserve is classed as IUCN protected area category Ia (strict nature reserve), with the objective of fully preserving the biota and other natural attributes without direct human interference or environmental changes except where needed to restore and preserve the ecology. The management plan was approved on 4 September 2009, and the advisory council was created on 8 November 2011.

The reserve is in a region that contains 12 sustainable use conservation areas and 6 fully protected areas. The fully protected areas, which cover 6,670,422 hectares (16,482,970 acres), are the Amazônia, Jamanxim, Rio Novo and Serra do Pardo national parks, the Nascentes da Serra do Cachimbo Biological Reserve and the Terra do Meio Ecological Station. The sustainable use areas include the Tapajós environmental protection area and the Altamira, Amaná, Jamanxim, Trairão, Itaituba I, Itaituba II and Tapajós national forests, covering a total of 7,555,889 hectares (18,671,010 acres).

== Threats ==
At the time of its creation the reserve had already been occupied for 15 years in about 94 locations by squatters who had moved north from Mato Grosso. As of 2015 about 200 families lived in the reserve. Large amounts of mahogany have been removed from the forests of the reserve via a 923 kilometres (574 mi) network of roads, creating a fragmented and vulnerable landscape. The remaining lumber is not seen as high value, so trees are mostly felled in order to create pasturage. As of 2013 26,402 hectares (65,240 acres) had been deforested, making it among the ten most deforested federal conservation units in the Amazon Legal. More than 10,000 hectares (25,000 acres) has been burned by squatters, and about 6% of the reserve has been converted to pasture.

The reserve has also suffered from predatory hunting and fishing. There are two abandoned mining areas covering 325 hectares (800 acres), which affect water quality. There are two small hydroelectric stations on the western margin of the reserve. In August 2015 it was reported that Senator Flexa Ribeiro of the Brazilian Social Democracy Party (PSDB) proposed to split the reserve into a 162,000 hectares (400,000 acres) National Park open to tourists and a 178,000 hectares (440,000 acres) Environmental Protection Area (APA) in which the inhabitants could engage in livestock breeding and commercial production of rice, bananas, pineapples and coffee.

== Sources ==
- Plano de Manejo da Floresta Nacional do Trairão, Localizada no Estado do Pará (PDF), Brasília – DF: ICMBio, archived from the original (PDF) on 2017-02-11
- "Projeto quer extinguir Reserva Biológica Nascentes da Serra do Cachimbo", ((o))eco (in Portuguese), 26 August 2015
- Rebio Nascentes da Serra do Cachimbo (in Portuguese), Chico Mendes Institute for Biodiversity Conservation, archived from the original on 2018-05-12
- REBIO Nascentes da Serra do Cachimbo (in Portuguese), ISA: Instituto Socioambiental
- Unidade de Conservação: Reserva Biológica Nascentes Serra do Cachimbo (in Portuguese), MMA: Ministério do Meio Ambiente
