= Curuá River =

There are several rivers named Curuá River in Brazil:

- Curuá River (Amazon River tributary)
- Curuá River (Iriri River tributary)
- Curuá River (Mato Grosso)
- Curuá Una River
- Curuá do Sul River

== See also ==
- Curuá, a municipality in the state of Pará, Brazil
