= Acari River =

Acari River may refer to several rivers in Brazil:

== Brazil ==
- Acari River (Amazonas)
- Acari River (Minas Gerais)
- Acari River (Rio de Janeiro)

== See also ==
- Acará River, Pará state, Brazil
- Acarai River, Pará state, Brazil
- Acuriá River, Acre state, Brazil
