= Catete =

Catete may refer to:

- Catete, Ícolo e Bengo, a small town and commune in the municipality of Icolo e Bengo, Luanda Province, Angola
- Catete, Rio de Janeiro, a district in Rio de Janeiro, Brazil
- Catete River (Iriri River), a tributary of the Iriri River in Pará state in north-central Brazil
- Catete River (Itacaiunas River), a tributary of the Itacaiunas River in Pará state in north-central Brazil
- Catete Palace, a former presidential palace in Catete, Rio de Janeiro
- Catete Station, a subway station of the Rio de Janeiro Metro
