= Catete River =

Catete River may refer to:

- Catete River (Iriri River), a tributary of the Iriri River in Pará state in north-central Brazil
- Catete River (Itacaiunas River), a tributary of the Itacaiunas River in Pará state in north-central Brazil
