= Pau d'Arco =

Pau d'Arco or Paudarco may refer to:

== Places ==
- Pau d'Arco, Pará, a municipality in the state of Pará in the Northern region of Brazil
- Pau-d'Arco, Tocantins, a municipality in the state of Tocantins in the Northern region of Brazil
- Pau d'Arco do Piauí, a municipality in the state of Piauí in the Northeast region of Brazil
- Pau d'Arco River, a river of Pará state in north-central Brazil

== Plants and herbs ==
- Tabebuia, a genus of trees, or herbal products derived from them
- Lapacho, herbal tea made from the inner bark of some Tabebuia trees
- Handroanthus, a genus of trees known in Latin America as pau d'arco or other names, including taheebo and lapacho.
