= Moju River (Acará) =

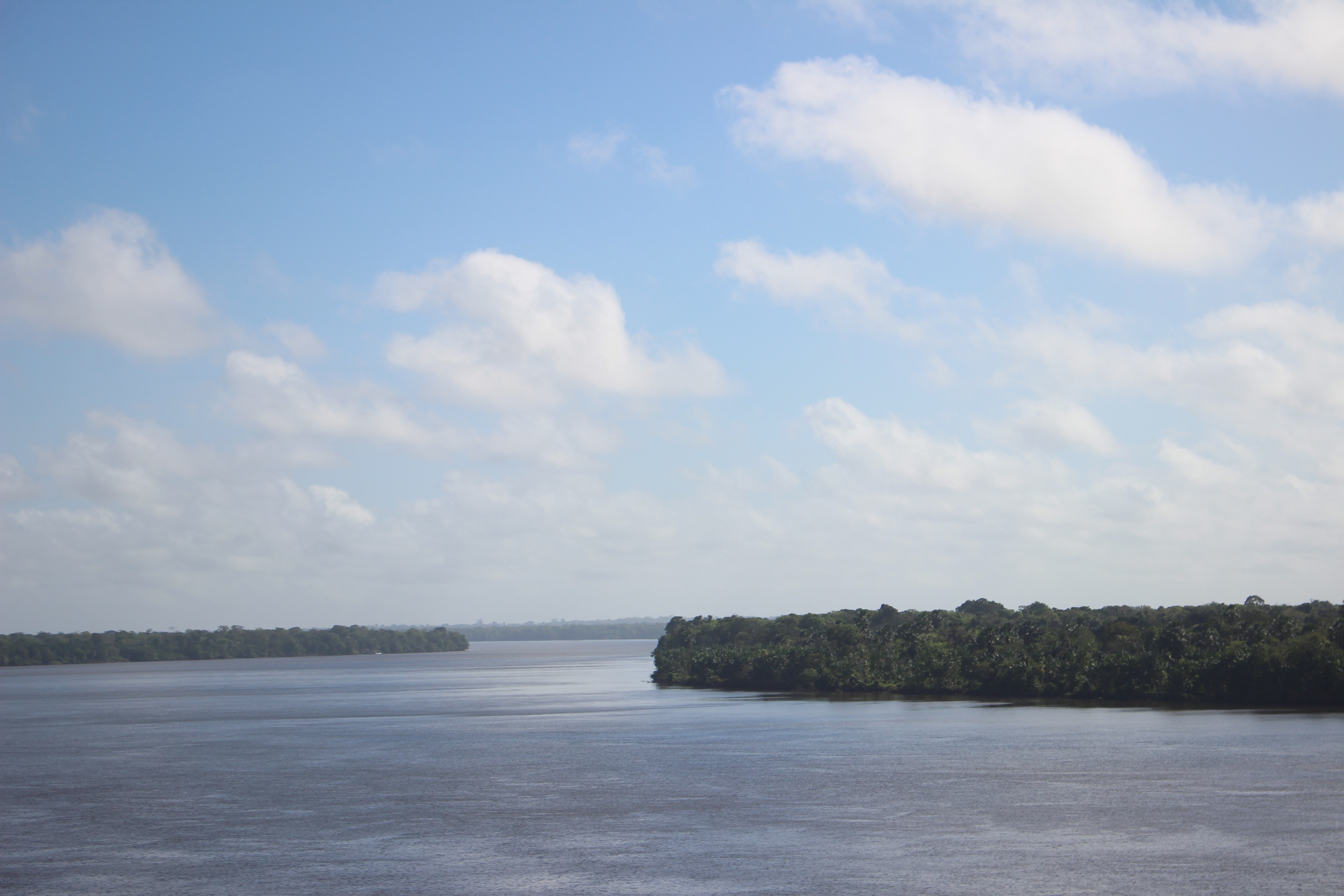

- Location within Brazil
- Native name: Rio Moju (Portuguese)

Location
- Country: Brazil

Physical characteristics
- Mouth
  - location: Acará River
  - coordinates: 1.669327°S 48.440734°W
- Length: 400

The Moju River (Portuguese: Rio Moju) is a river in the east of Pará state in north-central Brazil. It is a tributary of the Acará River.

== See also ==
- List of rivers of Pará
