= List of Pará rivers by confluence =

List of Pará rivers by confluence.

== Table of rivers by confluence ==
UPSTREAM South bank Amazon River WEST	UPSTREAM North bank Amazon River WEST	--Notes--
blank	blank	border of state: Roraima
blank	Rio Madeira (Pará) trib of Trombetas
blank	Trombetas	River no.2 of 5 in NORTH
blank	blank
Tapajós	blank
blank	Rio Maicuru
blank	Rio Paru
Xingu River w/Curua River	blank
Xingu River w/Iriri River	blank
Xingu River	blank
blank	Jari River	border of state: Amapá; River no.5 of 5
Araguaia River; Tocantins River	blank

== See also ==
List of rivers of Pará
