= Parauapebas River =

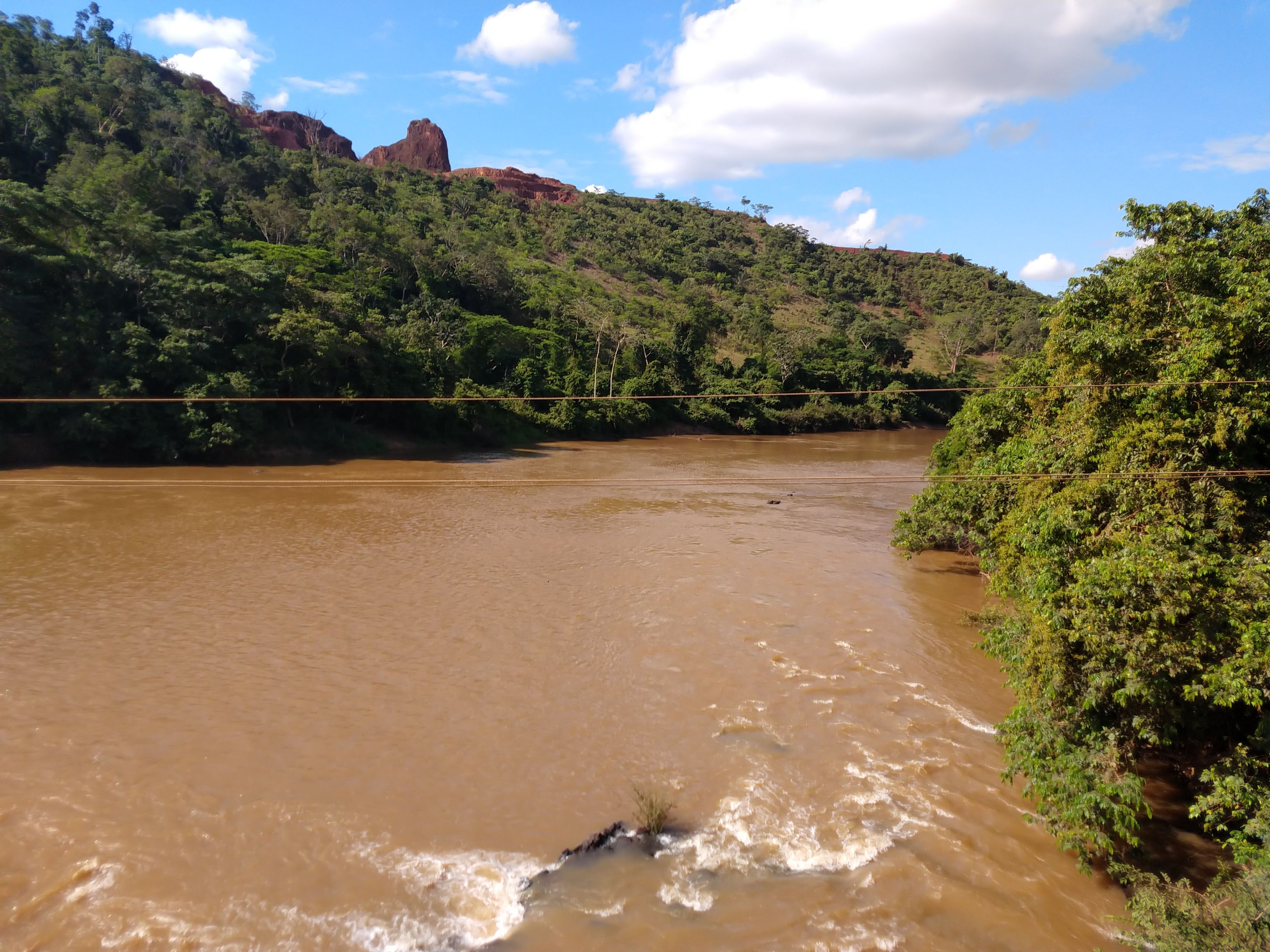

- Mouth location in Brazil
- Native name: Rio Parauapebas (Portuguese)

Location
- Country: Brazil

Physical characteristics
- Source
  - location: Pará state
- Mouth
  - coordinates: 5°35′53″S 49°43′42″W

The Parauapebas River is a river of Pará state in north-central Brazil. It is a tributary of the Itacaiúnas River, which in turn is a tributary of the Tocantins River.

The Parauapebas River is a blackwater river. Its basin is in the Xingu–Tocantins–Araguaia moist forests ecoregion.

== See also ==
- List of rivers of Pará
