= Tapirapé (disambiguation) =

The Tapirapé are an indigenous people of Brazil

Tapirapé may also refer to:

- Tapirapé Biological Reserve
- Tapirapé language, the language of the Tapirapé people
- Tapirapé River (Mato Grosso), Brazil
- Tapirapé River (Pará), Brazil
