= Piriá River (Marajó) =

- Location within Brazil
- Native name: Rio Piriá (Portuguese)

Location
- Country: Brazil
- State: Pará

Physical characteristics
- Mouth
  - location: Pará River
  - coordinates: 1.718155°S 50.062635°W

Basin features
- Tributaries
  - right: Mucutá River

The Piriá River (Portuguese: Rio Piriá) is a river of Marajó, which itself is an island in the Amazon Delta. It is located in the state Pará in northern Brazil, and is a tributary to the Pará River.

The Piriá originates from three streams that flow from the flooded igapó forests on Marajó Island. A village that is also called Piriá is located on its left bank, a little upstream from where it flows into the Pará River.

The river runs through part of the 194,868 hectares (481,530 acres) Terra Grande-Pracuúba Extractive Reserve, a sustainable use conservation unit created in 2006.

== See also ==
- List of rivers of Pará
