= Branco River (Pará) =

Location
- Country: Brazil

Physical characteristics
- Source
  - location: Pará state
- Mouth
  - coordinates: 7°01′26″S 51°40′48″W

The Branco River is a river of Pará state in north-central Brazil, a tributary of the Fresco River.

== See also ==
- List of rivers of Pará
