= Jacundá River =

Jacundá River may refer to:

== Brazil ==
- Jacundá River (Pará)
- Jacundá River (Rondônia), see Jacundá National Forest

== See also ==
- Jamundá River, Brazil
