= Curuaés River =

River in Pará state, Brazil

- Location within Brazil
- Native name: Rio Curuaés (Portuguese)

Location
- Country: Brazil

Physical characteristics
- Source
  - location: Pará state
- Mouth
  - coordinates: 7.412502°S 54.786728°W

Basin features
- River system: Curuá River

The Curuaés River is a river of Pará state in north-central Brazil. It is a right tributary of the Curuá River in the Xingu River basin.

The river rises in the 342,192 hectares (845,570 acres) Nascentes da Serra do Cachimbo Biological Reserve, a strictly protected conservation unit established in 2005. It is one of the headwaters of the Xingu River. It flows through the 724,965 hectares (1,791,430 acres) Altamira National Forest, a sustainable use conservation unit created in 1998.

== See also ==
- List of rivers of Pará
