= Serra do Cachimbo =

Mountain range in Brazil

Coordinates: 10°11′S 54°28′W

- Cachimbo Mountains
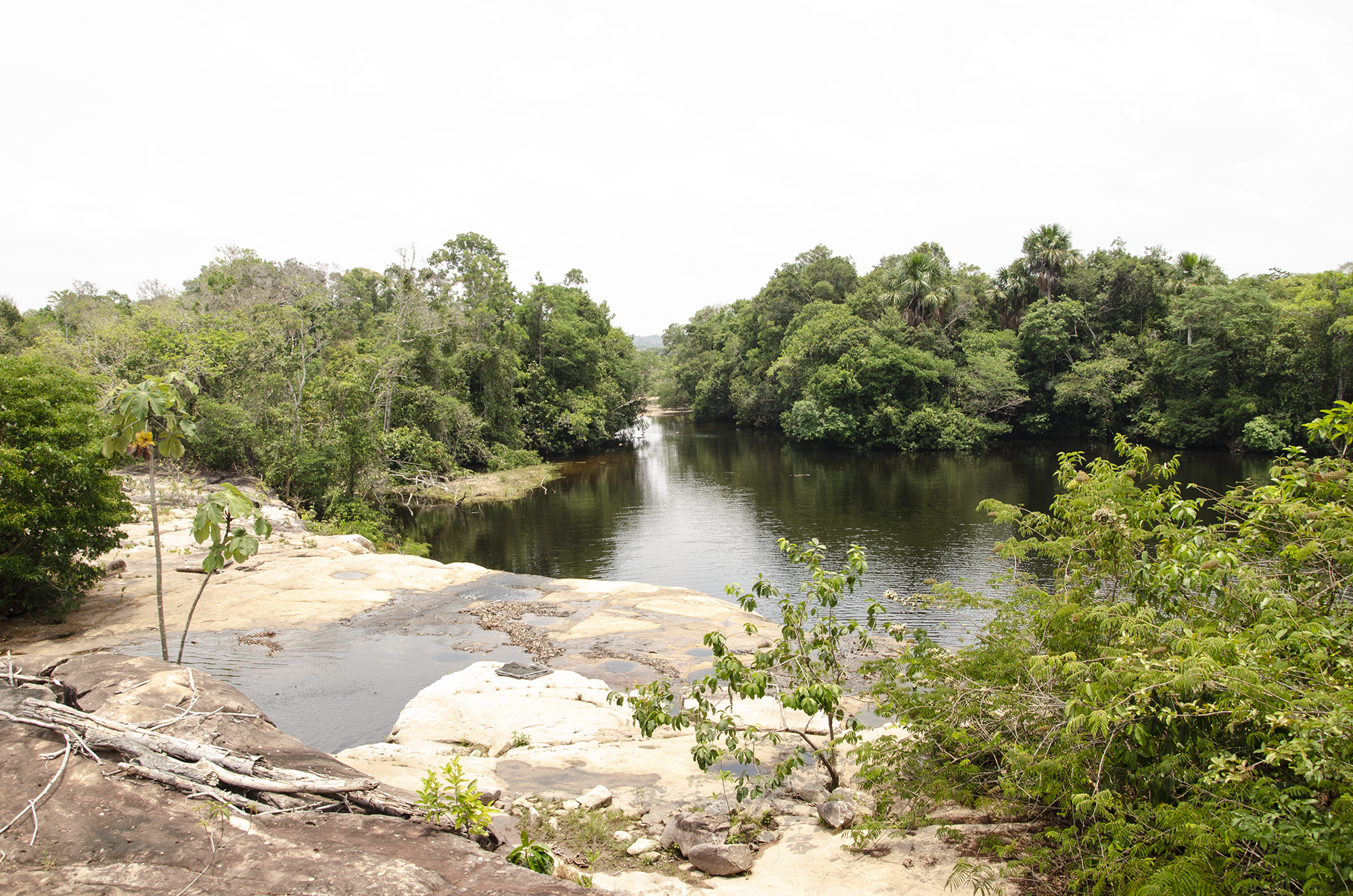

Geography
- Location within Brazil
- Country: Brazil
- State: Pará

Serra do Cachimbo (English: Cachimbo Range) is a low mountain range in the southern part of the state of Pará, Brazil. It is located mostly in the municipalities of Altamira, Itaituba, Jacareacanga, and Novo Progresso.

The Serra do Cachimbo complex is partly a continuous mass of mountains with a south west alignment, partly plateau with flat-bottomed valleys. Altitude ranges from 250 to 740 metres (820 to 2,430 ft) above sea level. Erosion has created ridges and ravines. In the northern part there are escarpments along the transition to the peripheral depression of southern Pará, where the rivers descend in rapids and waterfalls such as the Salto do Curuá.

The Nascentes da Serra do Cachimbo Biological Reserve covers part of the range. The southwest of the Rio Novo National Park is dominated by the Serra do Cachimbo, rising to 500 to 650 metres (1,640 to 2,130 ft), with a sharp escarpment forming its northern face. The Iriri River and its tributaries (notably Curuá River) rises in the Serra do Cachimbo and flows for 900 kilometres (560 mi) before joining the Xingu River. It is the main river of the 3,373,134 hectares (8,335,200 acres) Terra do Meio Ecological Station. The Jamanxim River, a tributary of the Tapajós, also rises in the Serra do Cachimbo. Jamanxim, Curuá and other rivers of Serra do Cachimbo are home to many endemic fish. Several of these are threatened by habitat loss and proposed dams, although there are also a few like Phycocharax rasbora that benefit from the reservoirs created by dams. Serra do Cachimbo is very rich in birds with more than 380 registered species. This richness is in part explained by the diversity of habitats, as it is in a region mostly covered by Amazon rainforest, but the Serra also has isolated patches of Cerrado vegetation.

Campo de Provas Brigadeiro Velloso is a large complex of the Brazilian Armed Forces, administrated by the Brazilian Air Force, located in Serra do Cachimbo. The complex includes the Cachimbo Airport.

== Sources ==
- Unidade de Conservação: Estação Ecológica da Terra do Meio [Protected Area: Terra do Meio Ecological Station] (in Portuguese), MMA: Ministério do Meio Ambiente
- Unidade de Conservação: Parque Nacional do Rio Novo [Protected Area: Rio Novo National Park] (in Portuguese), MMA: Ministério do Meio Ambiente
- Unidade de Conservação: Reserva Biológica Nascentes Serra do Cachimbo [Conservation Unit: Nascentes Serra do Cachimbo Biological Reserve] (in Portuguese), MMA: Ministério do Meio Ambiente
