= Baú River =

Baú River may refer to:

- Baú River (Pará), Brazil
- Baú River (Santa Catarina), Brazil

== See also ==
- Bao River, Shaanxi Province, China
