= Guajará River (Marajó) =

- Location within Brazil

Location
- Country: Brazil
- State: Pará

Physical characteristics
- Mouth
  - location: Pará River
  - coordinates: 1.754278°S 50.268925°W

The Guajará River (Portuguese: Rio Guajará) is a river of Marajó, which itself is an island in the Amazon Delta. It is located in the state Pará in northern Brazil.

== Course ==
The river has its source in the forests in the interior of Breves municipality. It flows in a southerly direction, and passes by a number of islands before it reaches a bay called Baía das Bocas in the Pará River. It is connected through river channels called furos with the Mutuacá River and the Curuacá River. Geological processes have slightly elevated the terrain between the Guajará and the Mucutá River.

The Guajará River is one of the main rivers of the 194,868 hectares (481,530 acres) Terra Grande-Pracuúba Extractive Reserve, a sustainable use conservation unit created in 2006.

== See also ==
- List of rivers of Pará
