= Andirá River =

Andirá River may refer to the following rivers in Brazil:

- Andirá River (Amazon River tributary)
- Andirá River (Acre River tributary)
- Andirá River (Juruá River tributary)
- Andirá River (Tapajós River tributary)

== See also ==
- Andra River (disambiguation)
