= Tapirapé River =

There are two rivers named Tapirapé in Brazil:

- Tapirapé River (Mato Grosso)
- Tapirapé River (Pará)
