= Mutuacá River =

- Location within Brazil

Location
- Country: Brazil
- State: Pará

Physical characteristics
- Source
  - location: Marajó island
- Mouth
  - location: Pará River
  - coordinates: 1.743151°S 50.091880°W
- Basin size: 247.46 km^{2} (95.54 mi^{2})

The Mutuacá River (Portuguese: Rio Mutuacá) is a river of Marajó, which itself is an island in the Amazon Delta. It is located in the state Pará in northern Brazil, and is a tributary to the Pará River.

The Mutuacá has its source in the flooded igapó forests on Marajó Island. It flows in south-eastern direction, entering the Pará River in a bay called Baía das Bocas. Two river channels called furos connect the Mutuacá to the Guajará River. They surround an area that is called Mutuacá Island.

The river runs through part of the 194,868 hectares (481,530 acres) Terra Grande-Pracuúba Extractive Reserve, a sustainable use conservation unit created in 2006.

== See also ==
- List of rivers of Pará
