= Vermelho River (Pará) =

Location
- Country: Brazil

Physical characteristics
- Source
  - location: Pará state
- Mouth: Itacaiúnas River
  - coordinates: 5°32′56″S 49°13′45″W

The Vermelho River is a river of Pará state in north-central Brazil.

== See also ==
- List of rivers of Pará
