= Caripetuba River =

Location
- Country: Brazil

Physical characteristics
- Source
  - location: Pará state

The Caripetuba River is a river of Pará state in north-central Brazil. It is an important river in its region to supply feeding the local population, beyond being a way of pluvial transport.

== See also ==
- List of rivers of Pará
