= Anapu River =

- Mouth location in Brazil
- Native name: Rio Anapu (Portuguese)

Location
- Country: Brazil

Physical characteristics
- Source
  - location: Pará state
- Mouth
  - coordinates: 2°04′33″S 51°29′11″W
- Length: 470 kilometres (290 mi)

Basin features
- River system: Pará River

The Anapu River is a river of Pará state in north-central Brazil. It is a tributary of the Pará River, a channel that connects the Amazon and Tocantins rivers to the south of Marajó island.

The basin of the Anapu River is in the Xingu–Tocantins–Araguaia moist forests ecoregion.

== See also ==
- List of rivers of Pará

== Sources ==
- Sears, Robin, Eastern Amazonian - Brazil (NT0180), WWF: World Wildlife Fund
- Ziesler, R.; Ardizzone, G.D. (1979), "Amazon River System", The Inland waters of Latin America, Food and Agriculture Organization of the United Nations, ISBN 92-5-000780-9, archived from the original on 21 October 2013
