= Acará-Mirim River =

Coordinates: 1°57′59″S 48°12′05″W

Location
- Country: Brazil

Physical characteristics
- Source
  - location: Pará state

The Acará-Mirim River is a river of Pará state in north-central Brazil.

== See also ==
- List of rivers of Pará
