= Jauaru River =

- Location within Brazil

Location
- Country: Brazil

Physical characteristics
- Source
  - location: Pará state
- Mouth
  - location: Est of Prainha, Pará
  - coordinates: 1.748083°S 53.354495°W

Basin features
- River system: Amazon River

The Jauaru River is a river of Pará state in north-central Brazil, a tributary of the Amazon River.

Part of the river's basin is in the Maicuru Biological Reserve.

== See also ==
- List of rivers of Pará
