= Sororó River =

- Location within Brazil
- Native name: Rio Sororó (Portuguese)

Location
- Country: Brazil

Physical characteristics
- Source
  - location: São Geraldo do Araguaia, Pará, Brazil
- Mouth
  - coordinates: 5.402367°S 49.137569°W

Basin features
- River system: Itacaiúnas River

The Sororó River (Portuguese: Rio Sororó) is a river in the state of Pará, Brazil. It is a left tributary of the Itacaiúnas River.

Tributaries of the Sororó River drain the Serra das Andorinhas within the 24,897 hectares (61,520 acres) Serra dos Martírios/Andorinhas State Park, created in 1996.

== See also ==
- List of rivers of Pará
