= Ribeirão Santa Maria =

Location
- Country: Brazil

Physical characteristics
- Source
  - location: Pará state
- Mouth
  - coordinates: 7°10′S 49°13′W

The Ribeirão Santa Maria is a river of Pará state in north-central Brazil. It is considered an extension of the Rio Pará distribution channel.

== See also ==
- List of rivers of Pará
