= Novo River (Iriri River tributary) =

Location
- Country: Brazil

Physical characteristics
- Source
  - location: Pará state
- Mouth
  - location: Iriri River
  - coordinates: 4°27′S 53°40′W

The Novo River is a tributary of the Iriri River in Pará state in north-central Brazil.

== See also ==
- List of rivers of Pará
