= Citaré River =

Location
- Country: Brazil

Physical characteristics
- Source
  - location: Pará state
- Mouth
  - location: Paru River
  - coordinates: 0°31′N 54°11′W

The Citaré River is a tributary of the Paru River in Pará state in north-central Brazil.

== See also ==
- List of rivers of Pará
