= Ipitinga River =

- Location within Brazil
- Native name: Rio Ipitinga (Portuguese)

Location
- Country: Brazil

Physical characteristics
- Source
  - location: Pará state
- Mouth
  - coordinates: 0.031944°N 53.007778°W

Basin features
- River system: Jari River

The Ipitinga River is a river of Pará state in north-central Brazil, a tributary of the Jari River.

Part of the river's basin is in the Maicuru Biological Reserve.

== See also ==
- List of rivers of Pará
