= Curiaú River =

Location
- Country: Brazil

Physical characteristics
- Source
  - location: Pará state
- Mouth: Anuma River
  - coordinates: 1°16′13″N 57°01′49″W

The Curiaú River is a river of Pará state in north-central Brazil.

== See also ==
- List of rivers of Pará
