= List of rivers of Pará =

List of rivers in Pará (Brazilian state).

The list is arranged by drainage basin from north to south, with respective tributaries indented under each larger stream's name and ordered from downstream to upstream. All rivers in Pará drain to the Atlantic Ocean, the majority of the state is on the Amazon basin.

== By drainage basin ==
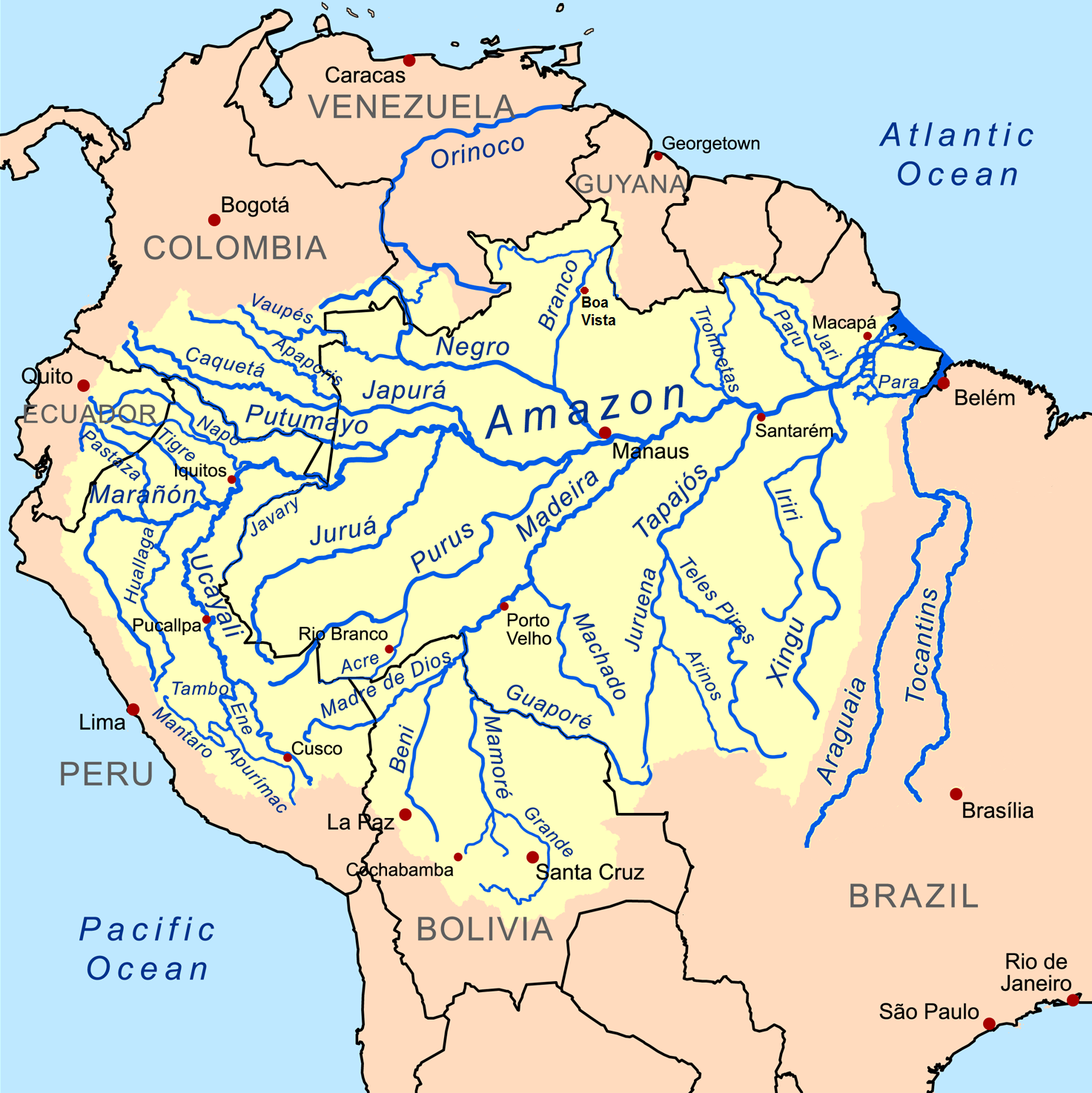
Amazon River basin

- Amazon River
  - Cajari River
  - Anajás River
    - Cururu River
    - Moções River
  - Jacaré Grande River
    - Aramá River
      - Mapuá River
    - Furo do Tajapuru (connects to Pará River)
      - Da Laguna River (Pauxis River)
    - De Breves River (connects to Pará River)
  - Baquiá Preto River
  - Jari River
    - Carecuru River
    - Ipitinga River
  - Xingu River
    - Jaraucu River
    - Acarai River
    - Tucurui River
    - Bacajá River
    - Bacajaí River
    - Itata River
    - Iriri River
      - Novo River
      - Carajarí River
      - Curuá River
        - Baú River
        - Curuaés River
      - Catete River
      - Xinxim River
      - Chiché River
      - Iriri Novo River
      - Ipiranga River
    - Pardo River
    - Fresco River
      - Branco River
      - Riozinho River
      - Trairão River
      - Arraias River
    - Petita River (Porto Alegre River)
    - Ribeirão da Paz
    - Liberdade River
  - Paru River
    - Citaré River
  - Guajará River
  - Jauaru River
  - Maicuru River
  - Curuá Una River
    - Moju dos Campos River
    - Curuá do Sul River
      - Tutuí River
  - Tapajós River
    - Arapiuns River
      - Aruã River
    - Andirá River
    - Curupara River
    - Jamanxim River
      - Tocantins River
      - Novo River
    - Crepori River
    - Pacu River
    - Das Tropas River
    - Leste River
    - Cururu River
    - São Manuel River (Teles Pires River)
      - Cururuaçu River
      - São Benedito River
      - Cristalino River
  - Curuá River
    - Mamiá River
    - Cuminapanema River
  - Trombetas River
    - Paru de Oeste River (Cuminá River)
      - Marapí River
    - Mapuera River
      - Baracuxi River
      - Tauini River
    - Cachorro River
      - Imabu River
    - Poana River
      - Cafuini River
    - Anamu River
      - Curiaú River
  - Juriti River
  - Nhamundá River
  - Mamuru River
    - Mariaquã River
  - Maués Açu River (Amazonas)
    - Urupadi River
    - Amanã River
- Paracauti River
- Arari River
- Atuá River
- Muaná River
- Pracumba River
- Pará River
  - Canaticu River
  - Pracuúba River
  - Piriá River
    - Mucutá River
  - Mutuacá River
  - Guajará River
  - Cupijó River
  - Araticu River
    - Dos Oeiras River
  - Panaúba River
  - De Breves River (connects to Amazon River)
  - Furo do Tajapuru (connects to Amazon River)
  - Jacundá River
  - Pacajá River
    - Camaraipe River
    - Uriuana River
    - Aratu River
  - Anapu River
    - Pracupí River
    - Pracaí River
    - Tueré River
- Tocantins River
  - Paracauari River
    - Saco River
  - Cajàzeira River
    - Da Direita River
  - Itacaiunas River
    - Catete River
    - Sororò River
    - Vermelho River
    - Parauapebas River
    - Tapirapé River
    - Pium River
  - Araguaia River
    - Ribeirão Santa Maria
    - Pau d'Arco River
      - Arraias do Araguaia River
    - Inajá River
    - Campo Alegre River
    - Ribeirão Santana
- Acará River
  - Moju River
    - Cairari River
  - Acará-Mirim River
- Guamá River
  - Capim River
    - Camaoi River
    - Surubiu River
    - Ararandeua River
- Caeté River
- Piriá River
- Gurupi River
  - Coraci River
  - Uraim River

== By alphabetical order ==
- Acará River
- Acará-Mirim River
- Acarai River
- Afuá River
- Amanã River
- Amazon River
- Anajás River
- Anamu River
- Anapu River
- Andirá River
- Araguaia River
- Aramá River
- Arapiuns River
- Ararandeua River
- Arari River
- Araticu River
- Aratu River
- Arraias do Araguaia River
- Arraias River
- Aruã River
- Atuá River
- Bacajá River
- Bacajaí River
- Baquiá Preto River
- Baracuxi River
- Baú River
- Branco River
- Cachorro River
- Caeté River
- Cafuini River
- Cairari River
- Cajari River
- Cajàzeira River
- Cajuúna River
- Camaoi River
- Camaraipe River
- Campo Alegre River
- Capim River
- Carajarí River
- Carecuru River
- Catete River
- Catete River
- Chiché River
- Citaré River
- Coraci River
- Crepori River
- Cristalino River
- Cuminapanema River
- Cupiró River
- Curiaú River
- Curuá River
- Curuá River
- Curuá do Sul River
- Curuá Una River
- Curuaés River
- Curupara River
- Cururu River
- Cururu River
- Cururuaçu River
- Da Direita River
- Da Laguna River (Pauxis River)
- Das Tropas River
- De Breves River
- Dos Oeiras River
- Fresco River
- Furo do Tajapuru
- Guajará River
- Guajará River
- Guamá River
- Gurupi River
- Imabu River
- Inajá River
- Ipiranga River
- Ipitinga River
- Iriri River
- Iriri Novo River
- Itacaiunas River
- Itata River
- Jacaré Grande River
- Jacundá River
- Jamanxim River
- Jaraucu River
- Jari River
- Jauaru River
- Juriti River
- Leste River
- Liberdade River
- Maicuru River
- Mamiá River
- Mamuru River
- Mapuá River
- Mapuera River
- Marajozinho River
- Marapí River
- Mariaquã River
- Moções River
- Moju River
- Moju dos Campos River
- Mucutá River
- Mutuacá River
- Nhamundá River
- Novo River
- Novo River
- Pacajá River
- Pacu River
- Panaúba River
- Pará River
- Paracauari River
- Paracauti River
- Parauapebas River
- Pardo River
- Paru River
- Paru de Oeste River (Cuminá River)
- Pau d'Arco River
- Petita River (Porto Alegre River)
- Piriá River
- Piriá River
- Pium River
- Poana River
- Pracaí River
- Pracumba River
- Pracupí River
- Ribeirão da Paz
- Ribeirão Santa Maria
- Ribeirão Santana
- Riozinho River
- Saco River
- São Benedito River
- São Manuel River (Teles Pires River)
- Sororò River
- Surubiu River
- Tapajós River
- Tapirapé River
- Tauini River
- Tocantins River
- Tocantins River
- Trairão River
- Trombetas River
- Tucurui River
- Tueré River
- Tutuí River
- Uraim River
- Uriurana River
- Urupadi River
- Vermelho River
- Xingu River
- Xinxim River

== See also ==
- Ilha de Marajó map
- List of Pará rivers by confluence

== Citations ==
- Rand McNally, The New International Atlas, 1993.
