= Mamuru River =

Coordinates: 3°15′S 56°30′W

Location
- Country: Brazil

Physical characteristics
- Source
  - location: Pará state
- Mouth
  - location: Amazonas state

Mamuru River is a river of Amazonas and Pará states in north-western Brazil.

== See also ==
- List of rivers of Amazonas
- List of rivers of Pará
