= Coraci River =

Coordinates: 2°28′26″S 46°26′24″W

Location
- Country: Brazil

Physical characteristics
- Source
  - location: Pará state

The Coraci River is a river of Pará state in north-central Brazil.

== See also ==
- List of rivers of Pará
