= Cristalino River =

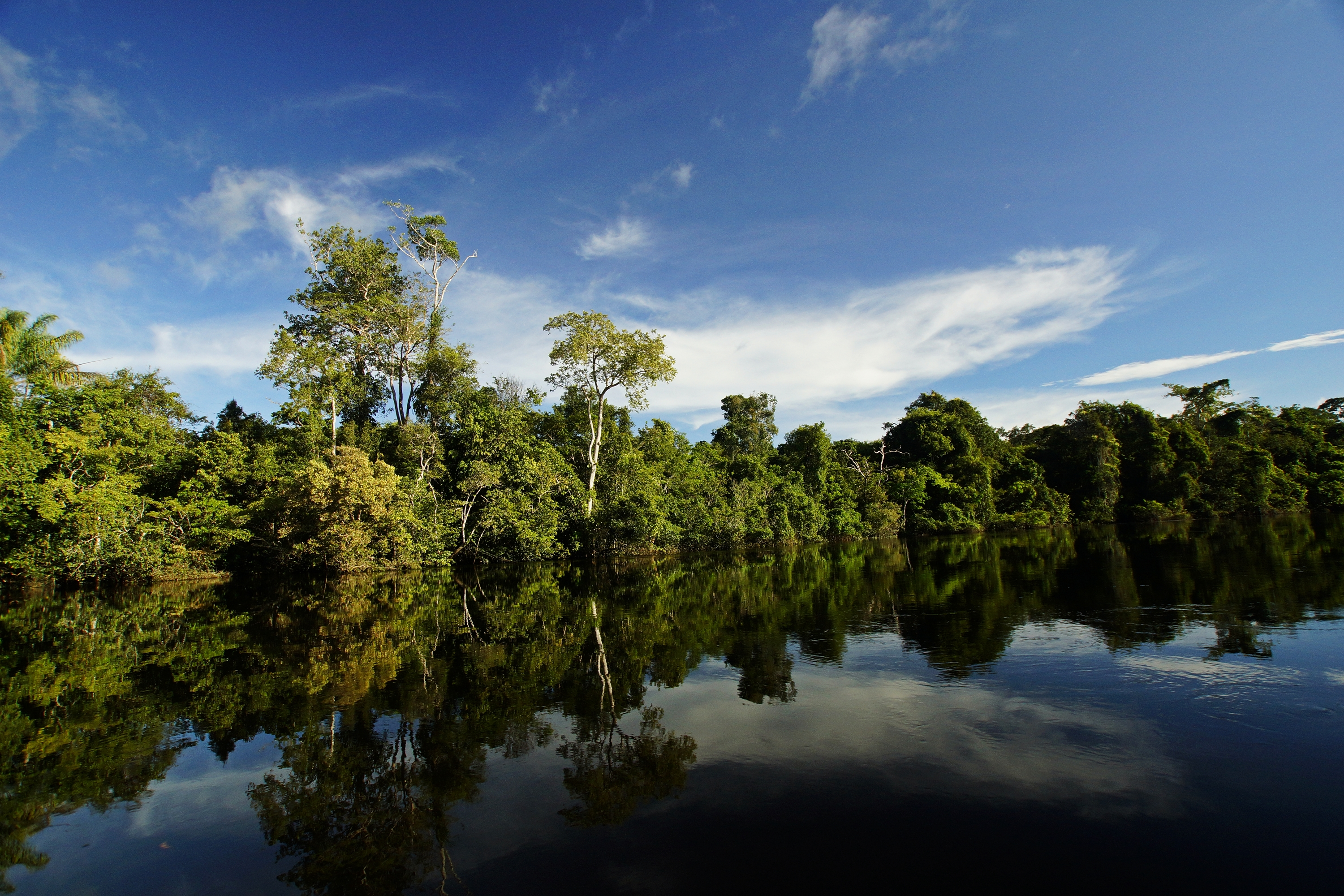
- Cristalino River in Mato Grosso

- Location within Brazil
- Native name: Rio Cristalino (Portuguese)

Location
- Country: Brazil

Physical characteristics
- Source
  - location: Nascentes da Serra do Cachimbo Biological Reserve, Pará
- Mouth
  - location: Teles Pires
  - coordinates: 9°38′7″S 55°55′44″W

Basin features
- River system: Teles Pires

The Cristalino River (Portuguese: Rio Cristalino) is a river of the states of Pará and Mato Grosso in western Brazil. It is a tributary of the Teles Pires.

== Course ==
The river rises in the 342,192 hectares (845,570 acres) Nascentes da Serra do Cachimbo Biological Reserve, a strictly protected conservation unit established in 2005 in the state of Pará. It is an indirect tributary of the Tapajós.

After crossing the border into Mato Grosso the river flows through the 184,900 hectares (457,000 acres) Cristalino State Park, established in 2001, before entering the Teles Pires. The river is navigable throughout the state park, despite the large number of submerged rocks and small rapids along its course.

== See also ==
- List of rivers of Mato Grosso
- List of rivers of Pará

== Sources ==
- Infraestrutura do Módulo do Parque Estadual do Cristalino (in Portuguese), PPBio
- Unidade de Conservação: Reserva Biológica Nascentes Serra do Cachimbo (in Portuguese), MMA: Ministério do Meio Ambiente
