= Imabu River =

River in Pará, Brazil

Coordinates: 0°44′S 57°22′W

Location
- Country: Brazil

Physical characteristics
- Source
  - location: Pará state

The Imabu River is a river of Pará state in north-central Brazil.

== See also ==
- List of rivers of Pará
