= Da Laguna River =

Location
- Country: Brazil

Physical characteristics
- Source
  - location: Pará state

The Da Laguna River is a river of Pará state in north-central Brazil.

== See also ==
- List of rivers of Pará
