= Ipiranga River (Pará) =

Location
- Country: Brazil

Physical characteristics
- Source
  - location: Pará state
- Mouth
  - location: Iriri River
  - coordinates: 9°17′32.78″S 53°54′58.68″W

The Ipiranga River is a tributary of the Iriri River in Pará state in north-central Brazil.

The river rises in the 342,192 hectares (845,570 acres) Nascentes da Serra do Cachimbo Biological Reserve, a strictly protected conservation unit established in 2005. It is one of the headwaters of the Xingu River.

== See also ==
- List of rivers of Pará
