= Cafuini River =

Coordinates: 1°16′N 57°10′W

Location
- Country: Brazil

Physical characteristics
- Source
  - location: Pará state

The Cafuini River is a river of Pará state in north-central Brazil.

== See also ==
- List of rivers of Pará
