= Fresco River =

River in Pará, Brazil

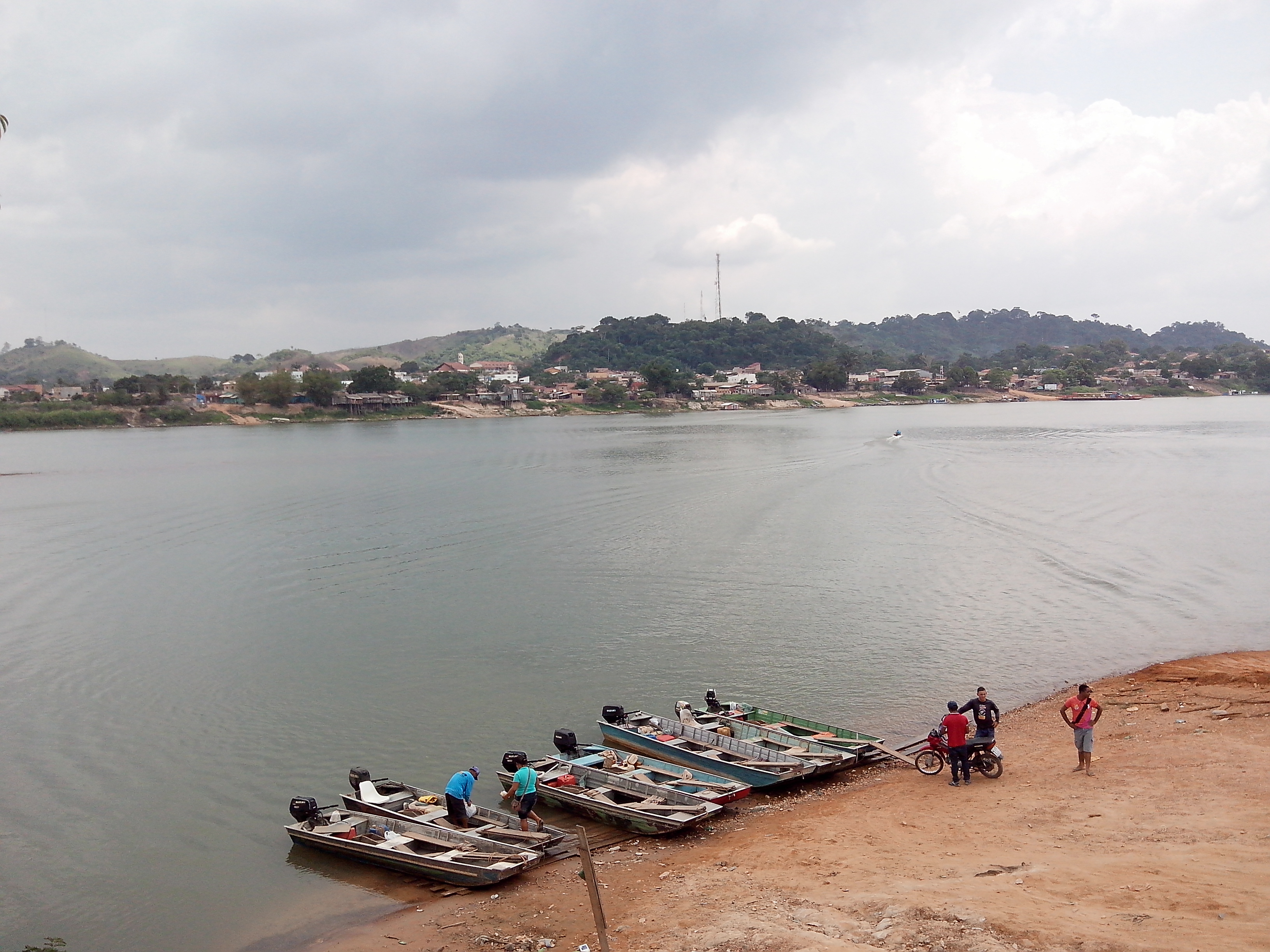

- Mouth location in Brazil
- Native name: Rio Fresco (Portuguese)

Location
- Country: Brazil

Physical characteristics
- Mouth
  - coordinates: 6°38′43″S 52°00′09″W
- Length: 560 km (350 mi)
- Basin size: 43,771 km^{2} (16,900 mi^{2})
- Discharge
  - location: São Félix do Xingu, Pará State (near mouth)
  - average: 865.6 m^{3}/s (30,570 cu ft/s)
  - minimum: 2.03 m^{3}/s (72 cu ft/s)
  - maximum: 4,526 m^{3}/s (159,800 cu ft/s)
- Discharge
  - location: Boa Esperança, Pará State (Basin size: 43,030 km^{2} (16,610 sq mi)
  - average: 851 m^{3}/s (30,100 cu ft/s) (Period of data: 1970-1996)837 m^{3}/s (29,600 cu ft/s)
  - minimum: 2 m^{3}/s (71 cu ft/s)
  - maximum: 4,449 m^{3}/s (157,100 cu ft/s)

Basin features
- River system: Xingu River
- Tributaries
  - left: Riozinho
  - right: Trairão

The Fresco River is a river of Pará state in north-central Brazil. It is a right tributary of Xingu River, which it joins at São Félix do Xingu.

The Fresco River is a blackwater river. Its basin is in the Xingu-Tocantins-Araguaia moist forests ecoregion.

== See also ==
- List of rivers of Pará
