= Chiché River =

River in Pará, Brazil

Location
- Country: Brazil

Physical characteristics
- Source
  - location: Pará state
- Mouth
  - location: Iriri River
  - coordinates: 8°15′S 53°30′W

The Chiché River (Xixé River) is a tributary of the Iriri River in Pará state in north-central Brazil.

== See also ==
- List of rivers of Pará
