= Andra River =

Andra River may refer to:

- A tributary of the Alba river in Romania
- Andra River in the Dibang Valley district of Arunachal Pradesh, India; see Mipi § Geography

== See also ==
- Andirá River (disambiguation)
