= Baracuxi River =

River in Pará, Brazil

Coordinates: 0°09′31″N 58°15′48″W

Location
- Country: Brazil

Physical characteristics
- Source
  - location: Pará state

The Baracuxi River is a river of Pará state in north-central Brazil.

== See also ==
- List of rivers of Pará
