= Mucutá River =

- Location within Brazil

Location
- Country: Brazil
- State: Pará

Physical characteristics
- Mouth
  - location: Piriá River
  - coordinates: 1.645309°S 50.018188°W
- Basin size: 643.88 km^{2} (248.60 mi^{2})

The Mucutá River (Portuguese: Rio Mucutá) is a river of Marajó, which itself is an island in the Amazon Delta. It is located in the state Pará in northern Brazil, and is a tributary to the Piriá River.

The Mucutá flows into south-western direction until half of its length, where it suddenly turns into south-eastern direction. Geological processes have slightly elevated the terrain between the Mucutá and the Guajará River.

The river runs through part of the 194,868 hectares (481,530 acres) Terra Grande-Pracuúba Extractive Reserve, a sustainable use conservation unit created in 2006.

== See also ==
- List of rivers of Pará
