= Paru River =

Coordinates: 1°32′S 52°38′W

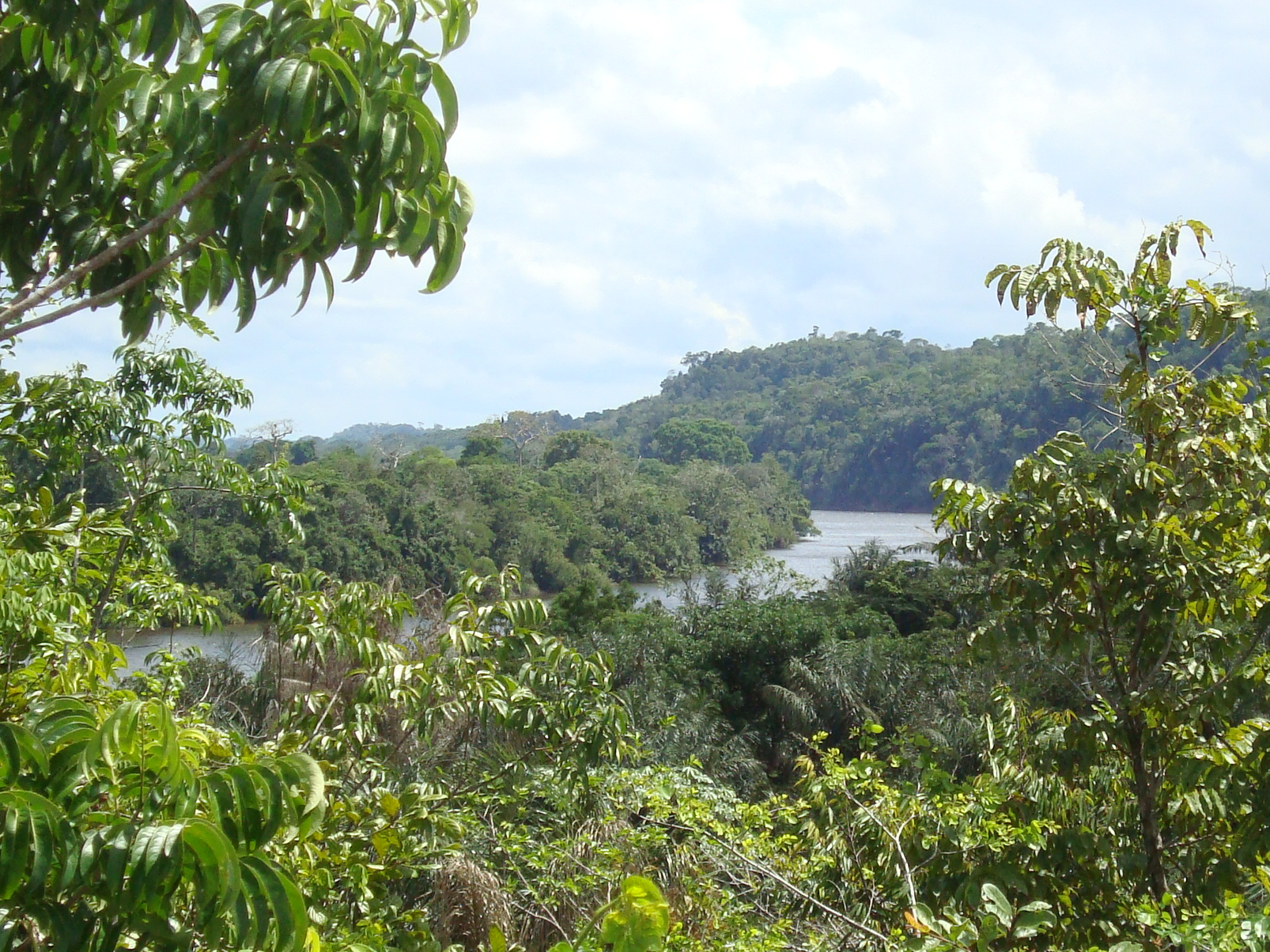

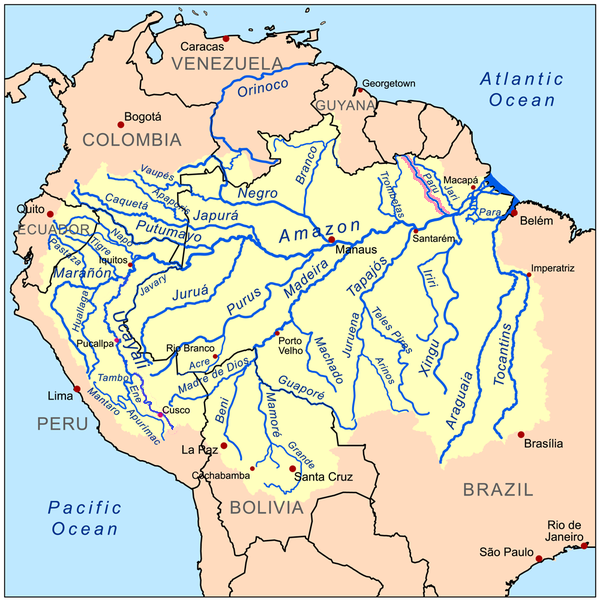
- Amazon Basin with Paru River in the northeast

Location
- Country: Brazil
- State: Pará

Physical characteristics
- Mouth: Amazon River
  - location: near the city of Almeirim, Pará, Brazil
- Length: 710 km (440 mi)
- Discharge
  - average: 970 m^{3}/s (34,000 cu ft/s)

Basin features
- Tributaries
  - right: Citaré River

The Paru River is a northern tributary of the lower Amazon in Pará state in north-central Brazil.

The river flows through the Uatuma-Trombetas moist forests ecoregion. Part of the river's basin is in the Maicuru Biological Reserve.

== In popular culture ==
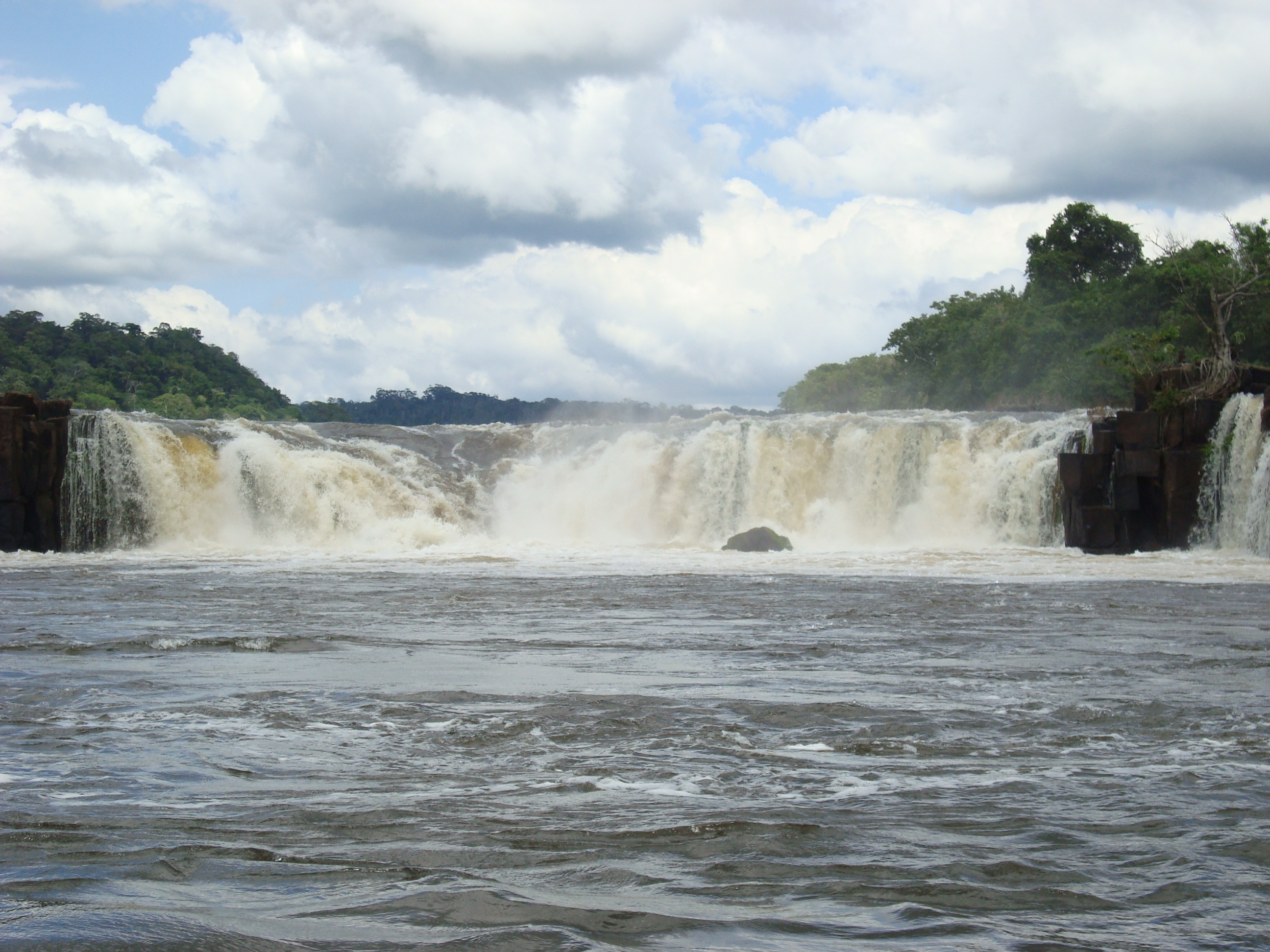
The Panama waterfalls on the Paru River

The seventh track of the album Aguas da Amazonia is named after the river.

== See also ==
- List of rivers of Pará
