= Tauini River =

Coordinates: 0°29′37″N 58°22′53″W

Location
- Country: Brazil

Physical characteristics
- Source
  - location: Pará state

The Tauini River is a river of Pará state in north-central Brazil.

== See also ==
- List of rivers of Pará
