= Petita River =

Coordinates: 8°36′S 52°38′W

Location
- Country: Brazil

Physical characteristics
- Source
  - location: Pará state

The Petita River is a river of the Pará state in north–central Brazil.

== See also ==
- List of rivers of Pará
