= Crepori River =

- Mouth location in Brazil
- Native name: Rio Crepori (Portuguese)

Location
- Country: Brazil

Physical characteristics
- Source
  - location: Pará state
- Mouth
  - coordinates: 5°44′07″S 57°19′15″W

Basin features
- River system: Tapajós

The Crepori River is a river of Pará state in north-central Brazil. It is a tributary of the Tapajós.

The river flows through the Tapajós-Xingu moist forests ecoregion. The river basin includes part of the 538,151 hectares (1,329,800 acres) Rio Novo National Park, a conservation unit created in 2006.

== See also ==
- List of rivers of Pará
