= Bacajaí River =

Location
- Country: Brazil

Physical characteristics
- Source
  - location: Pará state
- Mouth
  - coordinates: 3°34′S 51°46′W

The Bacajaí River is a river of Pará state in north-central Brazil.

== See also ==
- List of rivers of Pará
