= Furo do Tajapuru =

River in Brazil

Coordinates: 1°50′S 50°25′W

Location
- Country: Brazil

Physical characteristics
- Source
  - location: Pará state

The Furo do Tajapuru is a furo river channel of Pará state in north-central Brazil.

== See also ==
- List of rivers of Pará
