= Arapiuns River =

Coordinates: 2°18′S 55°00′W

Location
- Country: Brazil

Physical characteristics
- Source
  - location: Pará state

The Arapiuns River is a river in Pará state in north-central Brazil, which It is a tributary of the Tapajós, and merges into the latter river about 30 km (19 mi) before Tapajós merges into the Amazon River. Arapiuns is a blackwater river.

== See also ==
- List of rivers of Pará
