= Carecuru River =

River in Brazil

Coordinates: 0°08′51″S 52°56′17″W

Location
- Country: Brazil

Physical characteristics
- Source
  - location: Pará state

The Carecuru River is a river of Pará state in north-central Brazil.

== See also ==
- List of rivers of Pará
