= Cairari River =

River in Pará, Brazil

Location
- Country: Brazil

Physical characteristics
- Source
  - location: Pará state
  - coordinates: 2.5953°S 49.2761°W
  - length: 2.529 meters.

The Cairari River is a river of Pará state in north-central Brazil.

Approximate coordinates: 2.5953°S 49.2761°W, with an average water surface elevation of 2.529 meters.

Water level varies between 1.502 m (minimum) and 4.744 m (maximum).

== See also ==
- List of rivers of Pará
