= Novo River (Jamanxim River tributary) =

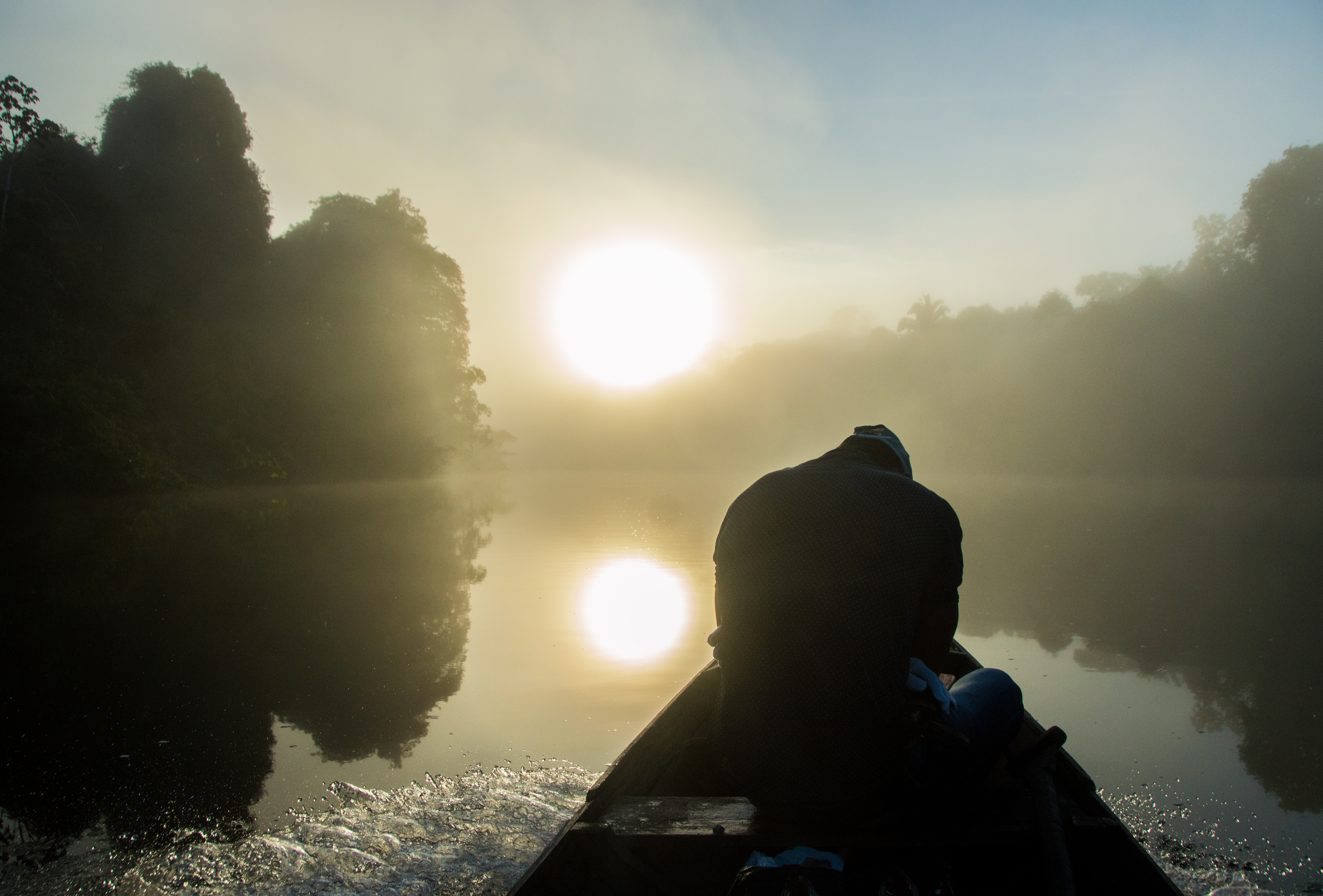
- Novo River

- Location within Brazil
- Native name: Rio Novo (Portuguese)

Location
- Country: Brazil

Physical characteristics
- Source
  - location: Pará state
- Mouth
  - coordinates: 6.282486°S 55.759432°W

The Novo River (Portuguese: Rio Novo) is a river of Pará state in north-central Brazil.

The Novo is a major tributary of the Jamanxim River. It is formed by the juncture of the Inambé and Marrom rivers, and has its headwaters in the Rio Novo National Park, a 538,151 hectares (1,329,800 acres) conservation unit created in 2006.

== See also ==
- List of rivers of Pará
