= Tueré River =

Coordinates: 2°47′38″S 50°59′20″W

Location
- Country: Brazil

Physical characteristics
- Source
  - location: Pará state

The Tueré River is a river within Pará state in north-central Brazil.

== See also ==
- List of rivers of Pará
