= Tutuí River =

Location
- Country: Brazil

Physical characteristics
- Source
  - location: Pará state
- Mouth
  - coordinates: 3°9′S 53°56′W

The Tutuí River is a river of Pará state in north-central Brazil.

== See also ==
- List of rivers of Pará
