= Cururuaçu River =

Location
- Country: Brazil

Physical characteristics
- Source
  - location: Pará, Brazil
- Mouth: Teles Pires
  - coordinates: 8°54′12″S 57°15′07″W

The Cururuaçu River is a river in the Pará state of north-central Brazil. It is a tributary of the Teles Pires.

== See also ==
- List of rivers of Pará
