= Pardo River (Xingu) =

- Location within Brazil
- Native name: Rio Pardo (Portuguese)

Location
- Country: Brazil

Physical characteristics
- Source
  - location: State of Pará, Brazil
- Mouth
  - coordinates: 5.357444°S 52.900649°W

Basin features
- River system: Xingu River

The Pardo River (Portuguese: Rio Pardo) is a river in the state of Pará, Brazil. It is a left tributary of the Xingu River.

The Pardo River defines the northwest boundary of the 445,408 hectares (1,100,630 acres) Serra do Pardo National Park, created in 2005.

== See also ==
- List of rivers of Pará

== Sources ==
- PARNA da Serra do Pardo (in Portuguese), ISA: Instituto Socioambiental
