= Uraim River =

Coordinates: 2°43′50″S 46°40′29″W

Location
- Country: Brazil

Physical characteristics
- Source
  - location: Pará state

The Uraim River is a river of Pará state in north-central Brazil.

== See also ==
- List of rivers of Pará
