= Carajarí River =

Coordinates: 4°36′59″S 54°03′34″W

Location
- Country: Brazil

Physical characteristics
- Source
  - location: Pará state
- Mouth
  - location: Iriri River

The Carajarí River is a tributary of the Iriri River in Pará state in north-central Brazil.

== See also ==
- List of rivers of Pará
