= Pracupí River =

Coordinates: 2°05′50″S 51°30′02″W

Physical characteristics
- Source
  - location: Pará state

The Pracupí River is a river of Pará state in north-central Brazil.

== See also ==
- List of rivers of Pará
