= Leste River =

River in Brazil

Location
- Country: Brazil

Physical characteristics
- Source
  - location: Pará state

The Leste River is a river in Pará state of north-central Brazil.

== Name Meaning ==
The name Leste comes from the Portuguese word for “east”, used in geography and navigation to denote the cardinal direction. Leste is the standard Portuguese term for “east” on a compass.

The river flows within Pará state, which lies largely within the Amazon rainforest of northern Brazil. The region is characterized by a humid tropical climate and dense forest. The precise course and tributaries of the Leste River may be relatively small or under-documented on major maps compared with larger Amazon tributaries, but the river is part of Pará’s vast freshwater network.

== Ecology and Wildlife ==
While there is limited published ecological data specific to the Leste River itself, rivers in Pará and the Amazon Basin support extremely rich biodiversity. The freshwater habitats of the region are home to a vast array of species — including diverse fish assemblages, reptiles such as caimans and turtles, and aquatic mammals like river dolphins, as well as abundant amphibians, insects, and birdlife.

== See also ==
- List of rivers of Pará
