= Pau d'Arco do Piauí =

Coordinates: 5.27583°S 42.405°W

- Municipality
- Country: Brazil
- Region: Nordeste
- State: Piauí
- Mesoregion: Centro-Norte Piauiense

Population (2020)
  - Total: 4,065
- Time zone: UTC−3 (BRT)

Pau d'Arco do Piauí is a municipality in the state of Piauí in the Northeast region of Brazil.

== See also ==
- List of municipalities in Piauí
