= Curuá do Sul River =

Coordinates: 2°39′S 54°10′W

Location
- Country: Brazil

Physical characteristics
- Source
  - location: Pará state

The Curuá do Sul River is a river of Pará state in north-central Brazil.

== See also ==
- List of rivers of Pará
