= Rhinella castaneotica =

Conservation status
- Least Concern (IUCN 3.1)

Scientific classification
- Kingdom: Animalia
- Phylum: Chordata
- Class: Amphibia
- Order: Anura
- Family: Bufonidae
- Genus: Rhinella
- Species: R. castaneotica

Binomial name
- Rhinella castaneotica (Caldwell, 1991)

Synonyms
- Bufo castaneoticus Caldwell, 1991; Rhinella castaneoticus (Caldwell, 1991)

Species of amphibian

Rhinella castaneotica is a species of toad in the family Bufonidae. It is known from the Amazon Basin in Bolivia (Pando), Brazil (Amazonas, Pará, and Rondônia), Colombia (Amazonas, Caquetá, and Putumayo), and eastern Peru, but likely occurs wider in the upper Amazon Basin. Its natural habitats are tropical moist old-growth lowland forests. It is a forest floor species that breeds in Brazil nut capsules and temporary pools. There are no known significant threats to this species.
