= Baú River (Pará) =

Location
- Country: Brazil

Physical characteristics
- Source
  - location: Pará state
- Mouth
  - coordinates: 7°20′S 54°49′W

The Baú River is a river located in Pará state in north-central Brazil.

== See also ==
- List of rivers of Pará
