= Bacajá River =

- Mouth location in Brazil
- Native name: Rio Bacajá (Portuguese)

Location
- Country: Brazil

Physical characteristics
- Source
  - location: Pará state
- Mouth
  - coordinates: 3°30′24″S 51°42′47″W
- Length: 374 km (232 mi)
- Basin size: 25,756.9 km^{2} (9,944.8 mi^{2})
- Discharge
  - location: Confluence of Xingu (near mouth)
  - average: 488.72 m^{3}/s (17,259 cu ft/s)

Basin features
- River system: Xingu River

The Bacajá River is a river of Pará state in north-central Brazil. It is a tributary of the Xingu River.

The Bacajá River is a blackwater river. Its basin is in the Xingu–Tocantins–Araguaia moist forests ecoregion.

== See also ==
- List of rivers of Pará
