= Serra do Pardo National Park =

National park in Pará, Brazil

- Parque Nacional da Serra do Pardo
- IUCN category II (national park)
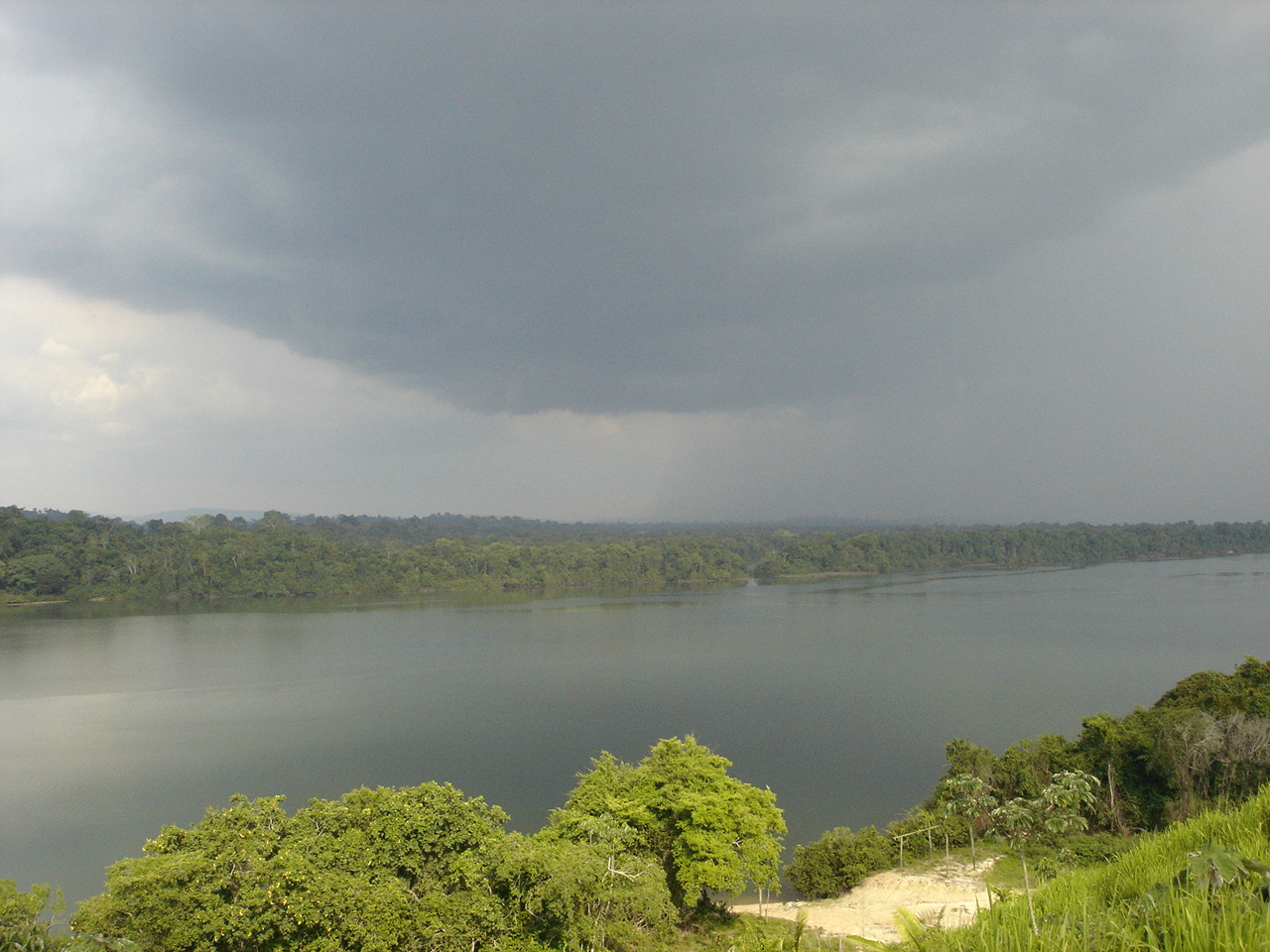
- Pending rainstorm in the park beside the Xingu River

- Location within Brazil
- Nearest city: Altamira, Pará
- Coordinates: 5°28′48″S 52°59′20″W
- Area: 445,408 hectares (1,100,630 acres)
- Designation: National park
- Created: 17 February 2005
- Administrator: Chico Mendes Institute for Biodiversity Conservation

The Serra do Pardo National Park (Portuguese: Parque Nacional da Serra do Pardo) is a National park in the state of Pará, Brazil.

== Location ==
The Serra do Pardo National Park is divided between the municipalities of São Félix do Xingu (51.28%) and Altamira (48.72%) in the state of Pará. It covers an area of 445,408 hectares (1,100,630 acres). The park takes its name from the mountain range that stretches along the Pardo River. The mountains have an average height of 400 metres (1,300 ft) and rise to a maximum altitude of 546 metres (1,791 ft). The Pardo River defines the northwest boundary of the park.

On the north, the park is bounded by the Rio Xingu Extractive Reserve. The west and south of the park adjoin the Triunfo do Xingu Environmental Protection Area. To the northwest, it adjoins the Terra do Meio Ecological Station. To the east, it is bounded by the Xingu River. The park is part of the Terra do Meio Mosaic, a grouping of protected areas.

== History ==
The park was used for rubber extraction until the rubber crisis of the 1950s, then was occupied by squatters who extracted timber, and later was used for grazing cattle. The region was the scene of much deforestation and many land ownership conflicts. However, the park still maintains about 95% of its natural vegetation.

The Serra do Pardo National Park was created by decree on 17 February 2005. It is administered by the Chico Mendes Institute for Biodiversity Conservation. With the creation of the park, the farms were expropriated and cattle removed in joint operations by ICMBio, the Brazilian Institute of Environment and Renewable Natural Resources and the federal police. The park is supported by the Amazon Region Protected Areas Program. The consultative council was created on 26 December 2012. The management plan was approved on 23 December 2015.

== Objectives and threats ==
The park is classed as IUCN protected area category II (national park). Objectives are to preserve natural ecosystems, facilitate scientific research and the development of education activities and environmental interpretation, recreation in contact with the nature and ecological tourism. Public visitation is allowed and may generate jobs related to tourism, benefiting the local community. Some traditional communities of former rubber tappers still live in the park pending transfer to another area where they can move without impairing their livelihoods. Threats include deforestation, cattle, illegal mining and infrastructure projects.

== Environment ==
Temperatures range from 20 to 40 °C (68 to 104 °F). The park is in the Amazon biome and contains open submontane rainforest, dense submontane forest and cerrado fields. The park is in the interfluvial region between the Xingu and Tapajós rivers, so may well have endemic species. Birds include the threatened white-crested guan (Penelope pileata), hyacinth macaw (Anodorhynchus hyacinthinus) and chestnut-throated spinetail (Synallaxis cherriei) . Protected species in the park include the jaguar (Panthera onca) and giant otter (Pteronura brasiliensis).

== Sources ==
- Brazil protects millions of hectares of Amazon, WWF, 21 February 2005
- Full list: PAs supported by ARPA, ARPA
- Parna da Serra do Pardo (in Portuguese), Chico Mendes Institute for Biodiversity Conservation, archived from the original on 2017-02-15
- PARNA da Serra do Pardo (in Portuguese), ISA: Instituto Socioambiental
- Unidade de Conservação: Parque Nacional da Serra do Pardo (in Portuguese), MMA: Ministério do Meio Ambiente
