= Jacundá River (Pará) =

Location
- Country: Brazil
- State: Pará

Physical characteristics
- Mouth: Pará River
  - coordinates: 1°56′46″S 50°26′20″W
- Length: 340 km (210 mi)

The Jacundá River is a river of Pará state in north-central Brazil.

== See also ==
- List of rivers of Pará
