= Tapirapé River (Pará) =

Location
- Country: Brazil

Physical characteristics
- Source
  - location: Pará state
- Mouth
  - coordinates: 5°40′S 50°17′W

The Tapirapé River is a river of Pará state in Brazil. It is a tributary of the Itacaiúnas River.

== See also ==
- List of rivers of Pará
