= Catete River (Itacaiúnas River tributary) =

- Mouth location in Brazil
- Native name: Rio Catete (Portuguese)

Location
- Country: Brazil

Physical characteristics
- Mouth
  - coordinates: 6°07′36″S 50°43′13″W

Basin features
- River system: Itacaiúnas River

The Catete River is a river of Pará state in north-central Brazil. It is a tributary of the Itacaiúnas River, which in turn is a tributary of the Tocantins River.

The Catete River is a blackwater river. Its basin is in the Xingu–Tocantins–Araguaia moist forests ecoregion.

== See also ==
- List of rivers of Pará
