= Pau d'Arco River =

Coordinates: 7°37′58″S 49°22′43″W

Location
- Country: Brazil

Physical characteristics
- Source
  - location: Pará state

The Pau d'Arco River is a river of Pará state in north-central Brazil.

== See also ==
- List of rivers of Pará
