= Trairão River =

Coordinates: 7°19′43″S 51°12′11″W

Location
- Country: Brazil

Physical characteristics
- Source
  - location: Pará state

The Trairão River is a river of Pará state in north-central Brazil.

== See also ==
- List of rivers of Pará
