= Altamira, Pará =

Municipality in Pará, Brazil

Altamira
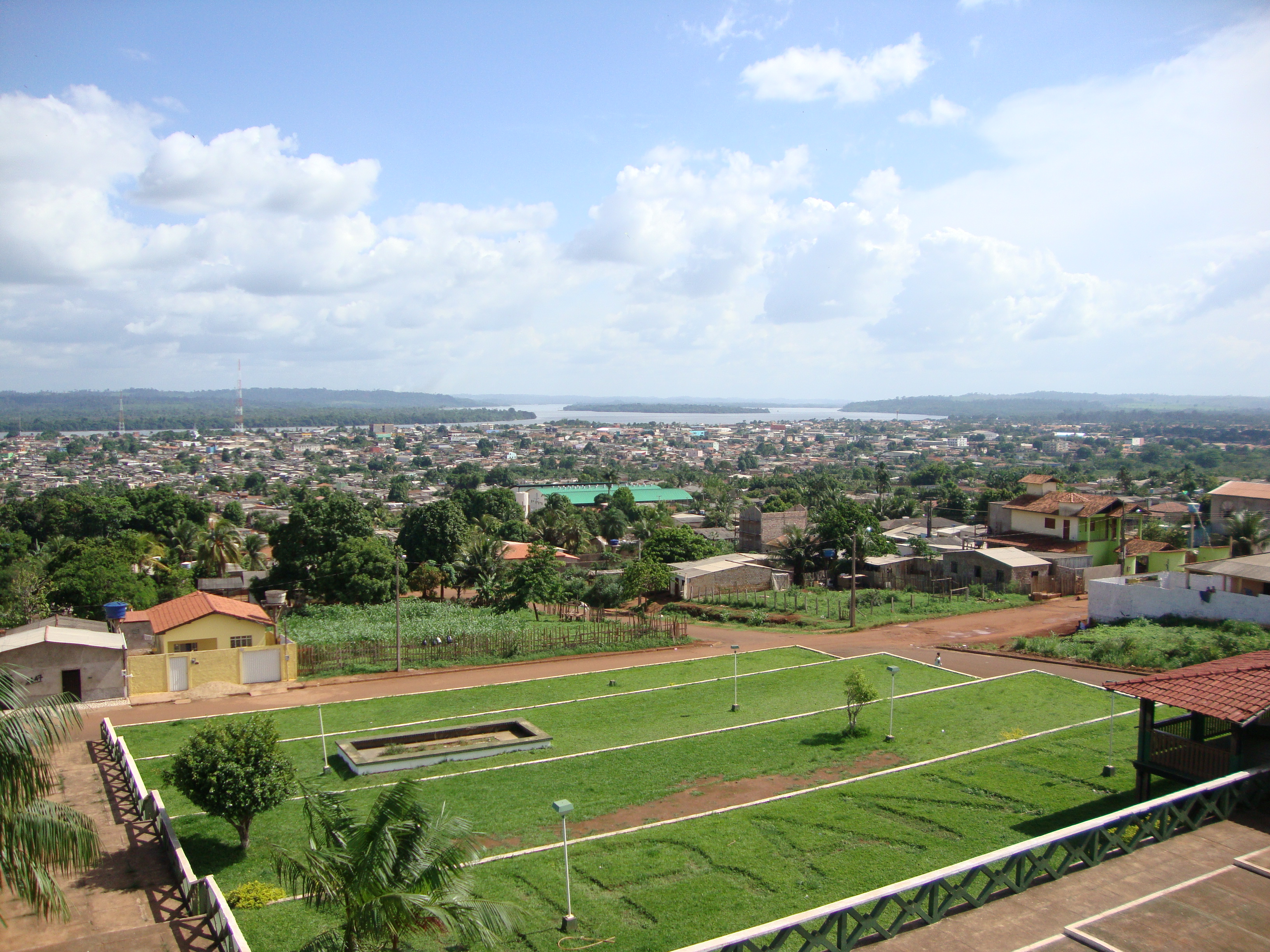
- Panorama view of Altamira and Xingu River

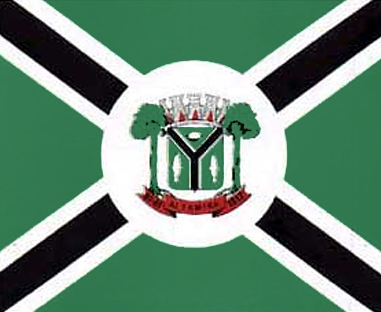
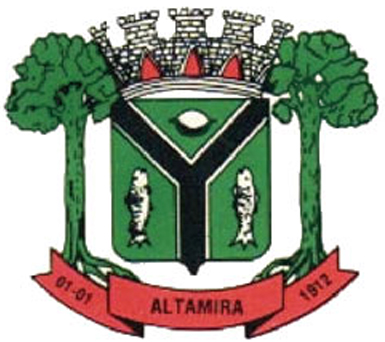
- Flag Coat of arms

- Location of Altamira

- Location in Brazil
- Coordinates: 3°12′10″S 52°12′21″W
- Country: Brazil
- Region: Northern Region
- State: Pará
- Founded: November 6, 1911

Government
  - Mayor: Claudomiro Gomes

Area
  - Total: 159,533.73 km^{2} (61,596.32 sq mi)
- Elevation: 109 m (358 ft)

Population (2022 Census)
  - Total: 126,279
  - Estimate (2025): 138,749
  - Density: 0.791550/km^{2} (2.05011/sq mi)
- Time zone: UTC−3 (BRT)

Altamira is a municipality in the state of Pará, in northern Brazil. It has an area of 159,533.73 square kilometres or 61,596.32 square miles, making it the largest municipality by area both in Pará state and Brazil, and until 2009 it was the world's largest municipal subdivision. It occupies 12.8% of the state's territory, 1.8% of Brazil's territory and 0.8% of South America. It also covers a more extensive area than 104 countries, and its size is comparable to that of the US state of Georgia.

Altamira Municipality encompasses the Altamira city and district, the seat of local government, whose majority population lives in urban area, and nine other mostly rural districts (most of those covered by the Amazon rainforest), whose urban populations are minorities, and live in inhabited areas spaced by tens or hundreds of kilometers. According to the 2010 Brazilian National Census the municipality had 99,075 inhabitants which grew to 115,969 at the 2020 Census, making a density of only 0.73 inhabitants per square kilometer at the same year. It is home to hundreds of indigenous communities and environmental protection areas. The Belo Monte Dam, the world's fourth largest hydroelectric dam is also located in the municipality.

== History ==
The history of Altamira traditionally includes the period from the installation of the Jesuit mission of the city to the present day. However, the municipal territory has been inhabited since time immemorial by nomadic and semi-nomadic indigenous peoples.

=== Mission Tavaquara ===
Although it is well known that even before the eighteenth century former Jesuit Missions already inhabited the Xingu region, it was not until the 1750s that Father Roque Hunderfund entered the Xingu River until the Tucuruí Igarapé, later called Vitória. There, he made contacts with indigenous Xipaia and Kuruaya, who guided him towards Volta Grande do Xingu. There, near the mouth of the Panelas stream, they chose the foundation of the Tavaquara Mission, whose settlement formed the city of Altamira.

The policies of the Portuguese Prime Minister Marquês de Pombal, still in the eighteenth century, shut down all Jesuit missions in the colonies, causing the Tavaquara Mission to close its activities. The parish of Souzel continued to assist the village, but only in 1841 did Fr. Antonio Torquato de Souza reopen the sting that linked the Victoria stream on the lower Xingu ground to the Tavaquara Mission, higher up. crossing the waterfalls, making the work in Tavaquara more accessible.

=== Administrative recognition ===
The first administrative elevation took place on April 14, 1874, when the municipality of Souzel (now Senator José Porfírio) was created, where the Tavaquara Mission (Altamira) was elevated to the status of village. During this period the village survived from the extraction and commercialization of rubber and other drugs from the backlands, as well as communicating with Souzel and Moz Port by steam navigation.

On April 2, 1883, under the influence of Colonel Francisco Gayoso, the town of Tavaquara was elevated to the town of Souzel, receiving the name of Altamira. Also under the influence of Colonel Gayoso, a bite was opened, linking the bass to the middle Xingu, with the objective of turning it into a road, employing African slave labor.

In 1880, Agrarian Cavalgante resumed the works of Col. Gayoso, rectifying the layout of the road, starting from where today is the headquarters of the municipality of Vitória do Xingu and arriving at the mouth of the Ambé stream, there building Fort Ambé, which no longer exists.

== Economy ==
The municipal GDP is around US$450 million and is mainly linked to agricultural activities, trade and since 2010 has been driven by the construction of the Belo Monte Dam.

The municipality is served by Altamira Airport.

== Belo Monte Dam ==
In Altamira the third-largest dam in the world by generating capacity (behind the Three Gorges Dam and Itaipu Dam), with a capacity of 11.233 GW, is being built. As of October 2019 all turbines at Pimental and 17 turbines in main power powerhouse are online with total installed capacity of 10,388.87 MW at Belo Monte site, totaling 10,621.97 MW with the Pimental site.

== Geography ==
Altamira is located in a transition area between the Brazilian Highlands and Amazonian Lowlands, is situated on the shores of the Xingu River a tributary of the Amazon River, with average elevation of 109 meters.

The municipality contains part of the 724,965-hectare (1,791,430-acre) Altamira National Forest, a sustainable use conservation unit created in 1998. The municipality contains part of the Jamanxim National Park, a protected area. It contains part of the 3,373,134-hectare (8,335,200-acre) Terra do Meio Ecological Station, a strictly protected conservation unit created in 2005. It also contains part of the 342,192-hectare (845,570-acre) Nascentes da Serra do Cachimbo Biological Reserve, a strictly protected conservation unit established in 2005. The municipality contains 49% of the 445,408-hectare (1,100,630-acre) Serra do Pardo National Park, established at the same time.

=== Climate ===
The climate of Altamira is tropical monsoon (Köppen Am), with high temperatures all year and average rainfall of 1,844 millimetres or 73 inches annually. The seasons are undefined by temperature, but there is a distinct wet season from November/December to May/June and a dry season from July to October, although some rain does occur during this dry season.

Climate data for Altamira (1981–2010)
Month	Jan	Feb	Mar	Apr	May	Jun	Jul	Aug	Sep	Oct	Nov	Dec	Year
Mean daily maximum °C (°F)	31.3 (88.3)	30.9 (87.6)	30.9 (87.6)	31.2 (88.2)	31.8 (89.2)	32.5 (90.5)	33.0 (91.4)	33.8 (92.8)	34.1 (93.4)	33.9 (93.0)	33.4 (92.1)	32.3 (90.1)	32.4 (90.3)
Daily mean °C (°F)	26.3 (79.3)	25.9 (78.6)	26.1 (79.0)	26.3 (79.3)	26.7 (80.1)	26.8 (80.2)	27.0 (80.6)	27.6 (81.7)	27.8 (82.0)	28.0 (82.4)	27.8 (82.0)	27.0 (80.6)	26.9 (80.4)
Mean daily minimum °C (°F)	22.5 (72.5)	22.2 (72.0)	22.5 (72.5)	22.5 (72.5)	22.8 (73.0)	22.1 (71.8)	22.0 (71.6)	22.2 (72.0)	22.7 (72.9)	22.9 (73.2)	23.0 (73.4)	22.8 (73.0)	22.5 (72.5)
Average precipitation mm (inches)	288.5 (11.36)	319.4 (12.57)	414.6 (16.32)	366.9 (14.44)	228.1 (8.98)	120.6 (4.75)	65.7 (2.59)	27.3 (1.07)	43.6 (1.72)	54.3 (2.14)	93.5 (3.68)	171.8 (6.76)	2,194.3 (86.39)
Average precipitation days (≥ 1.0 mm)	19	21	24	22	18	11	7	4	5	6	6	12	155
Average relative humidity (%)	83.7	85.3	85.7	85.6	84.2	81.0	77.8	75.1	73.4	73.1	74.9	79.5	79.9
Mean monthly sunshine hours	130.1	110.3	114.3	132.6	164.4	205.9	236.3	234.4	199.3	180.3	143.3	127.2	1,978.4
Source: Instituto Nacional de Meteorologia

== Media ==
Altamira is an important destination in the 1979 movie Bye Bye Brasil.
