= Catete River (Iriri River tributary) =

- Mouth location in Brazil
- Native name: Rio Catete (Portuguese)

Location
- Country: Brazil

Physical characteristics
- Source
  - location: Pará state
- Mouth
  - coordinates: 6°21′01″S 54°03′55″W

Basin features
- River system: Iriri River

The Catete River is a left tributary of the Iriri River in Pará state in north-central Brazil.

== See also ==
- List of rivers of Pará
