= Curuá River (Iriri River tributary) =

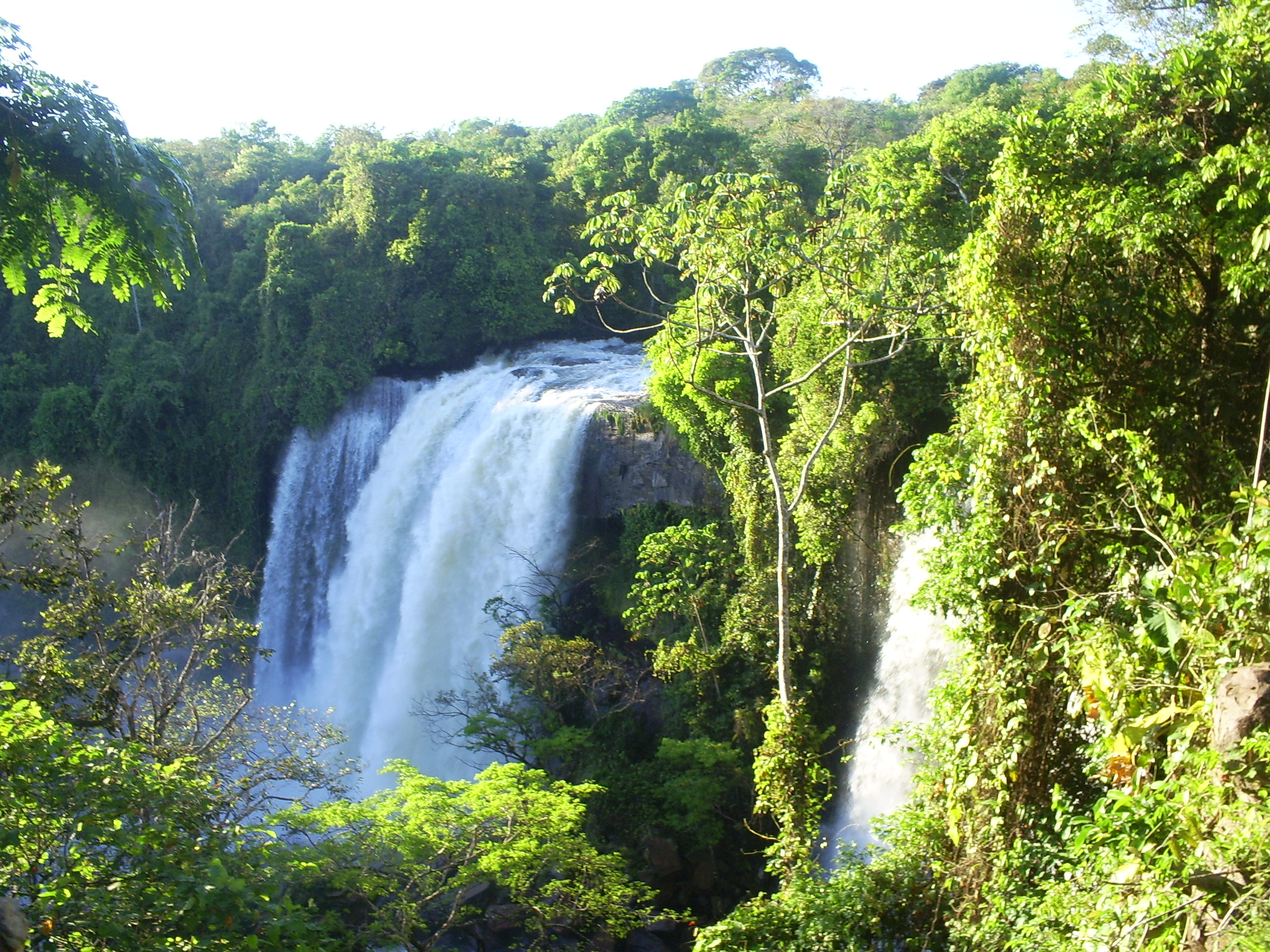

- Mouth location in Brazil
- Native name: Rio Curuá River (Portuguese)

Location
- Country: Brazil

Physical characteristics
- Source
  - location: Pará
- Mouth
  - coordinates: 5°22′35″S 54°27′09″W
- Length: 530

Basin features
- River system: Iriri River

The Curuá River is a tributary of the Iriri River in Pará state in north-central Brazil. The river flows through the Tapajós-Xingu moist forests ecoregion. Along its course to its mouth at the Iriri River, it passes through several areas inhabited by indigenous tribes, such as a tribe of Kayapo people, and passes less than a kilometer of the Castelo dos Sonhos district. The river rises in the 342,192 hectares (845,570 acres) Nascentes da Serra do Cachimbo Biological Reserve, a strictly protected conservation unit established in 2005. It is one of the headwaters of the Xingu River.

The upper and lower parts of the Curuá River are divided by two waterfalls, only 50 m (160 ft) apart. The first waterfall is 60 m (200 ft) tall and the second is 40 m (130 ft) tall. As a consequence, the fauna in the upper part, above the waterfalls on the Serra do Cachimbo plateau, is highly distinct and includes several endemic fish: three Lebiasina species, Brachychalcinus reisi, Erythrocharax altipinnis, Jupiaba kurua, Knodus nuptialis, Moenkhausia petymbuaba, Leporinus guttatus, three Harttia species, three Apistogramma species (including A. kullanderi, the largest in the genus), and others. These are, to some extent, protected by the reserve. Still, habitat loss continues, and the proposed building of dams, which would remove the waterfalls that isolate the endemics from more widespread species in the lower part, potentially represents a serious threat.

== See also ==
- List of rivers of Pará
