= Iriri River =

River in Pará, Brazil

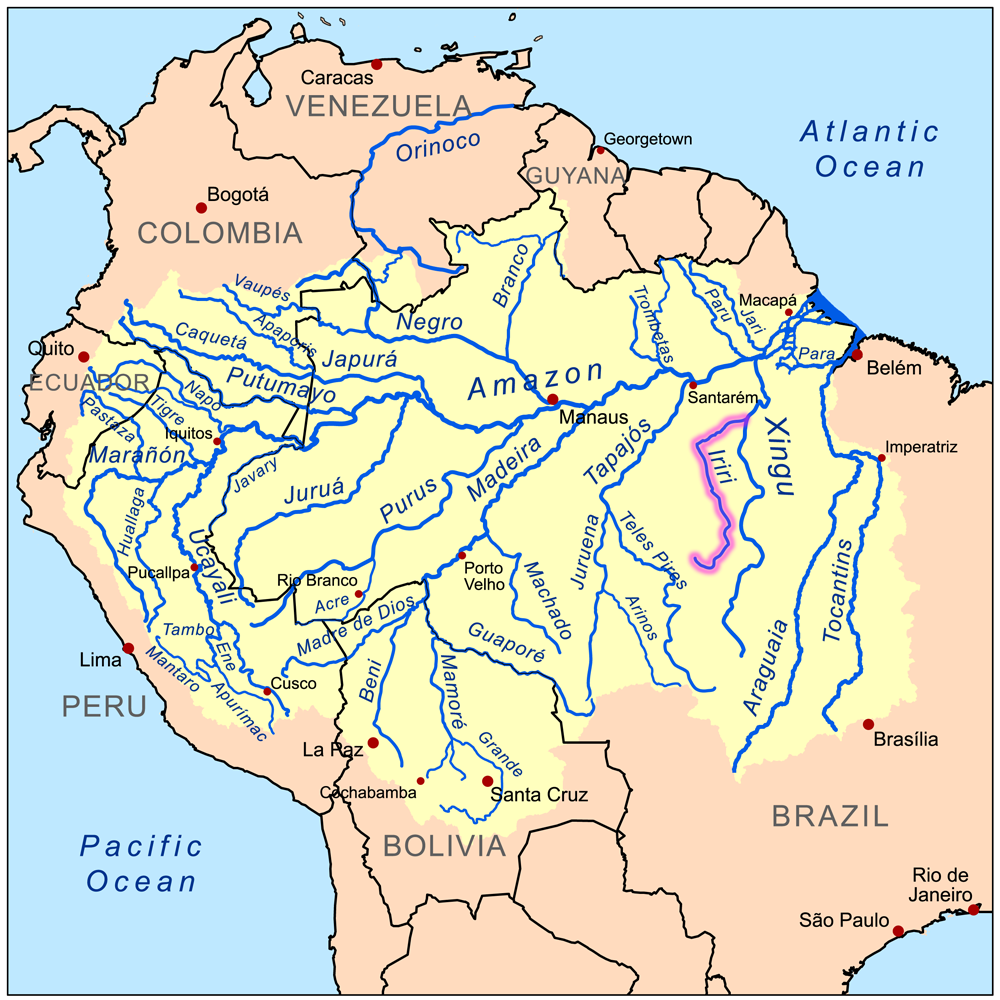
- Native name: Rio Iriri (Portuguese); Kororoti (Kayapó)

Location
- Country: Brazil

Physical characteristics
- Source
  - location: Pará, Brazil
  - elevation: 619 m (2,031 ft)
- Mouth: Xingu River
  - coordinates: 3°49′00″S 52°36′20″W
  - elevation: 116 m (381 ft)
- Length: 1,151 km (715 mi)
- Basin size: 141,943 km^{2} (54,804 sq mi)
- Discharge
  - location: Confluence of Xingu (near mouth)
  - average: 3,028 m^{3}/s (106,900 cu ft/s)
  - minimum: 56.3 m^{3}/s (1,990 cu ft/s)
  - maximum: 14,025 m^{3}/s (495,300 cu ft/s)
- Discharge
  - location: Pedra do Ó gauge station (130 km upstream of mouth - Basin size 123,827 km^{2} (47,810 sq mi)
  - average: 2,748 m^{3}/s (97,000 cu ft/s)
  - minimum: 49 m^{3}/s (1,700 cu ft/s)
  - maximum: 12,235 m^{3}/s (432,100 cu ft/s)

Basin features
- Tributaries
  - left: Curuá River, Catete River, Chiché River, Ipiranga River
  - right: Novo River, Carajarí River, Xinxim River, Iriri Novo River

The Iriri River (Portuguese: Rio Iriri [ˈʁi.u iɾiˈɾi]; Mẽbêngôkre: Kororoti [kɔˌɾɔɾɔˈti]) is a large tributary of the Xingu River in Brazil, in the state of Pará. It is 1,300 km (810 mi) long making it the 116th longest river in the world (with Krishna River, India) and the 15th longest in the Amazon basin. The headwaters are the traditional home of the Panará people.

== Course ==
The river rises in the 342,192-hectare (845,570-acre) Nascentes da Serra do Cachimbo Biological Reserve, a strictly protected conservation unit established in 2005 in the Serra do Cachimbo. It is one of the headwaters of the Xingu River. It flows for 900 kilometres (560 mi) before joining the Xingu, running through the 3,373,133.89-hectare (8,335,195.4-acre) Terra do Meio Ecological Station. The river varies greatly in volume depending on the season, and in the dry season includes waterfalls, rocks and rapids.

The Iriri River flows through the Tapajós–Xingu moist forests ecoregion. The river is rich in fish, including many species found only there and in the Xingu. Large sections remain unexplored due to its remoteness in a region surrounded by Amazon rainforest, and sections with strong current and cataracts.

== Sources ==
- Bleher, H. (2009), "Rio Iriri biotope, Brazil.", Practical Fishkeeping, archived from the original on 27 May 2014
- Sears, Robin, Amazon Basin - Brazil (NT0168), WWF: World Wildlife Fund
- Unidade de Conservação: Estação Ecológica da Terra do Meio (in Portuguese), MMA: Ministério do Meio Ambiente, archived from the original on 2018-10-01
- Unidade de Conservação: Reserva Biológica Nascentes Serra do Cachimbo (in Portuguese), MMA: Ministério do Meio Ambiente
- Ziesler, R.; Ardizzone, G.D. (1979), "Amazon River System", The Inland waters of Latin America, Food and Agriculture Organization of the United Nations, ISBN 92-5-000780-9, archived from the original on 21 October 2013
