= Acará River =

River in Brazil

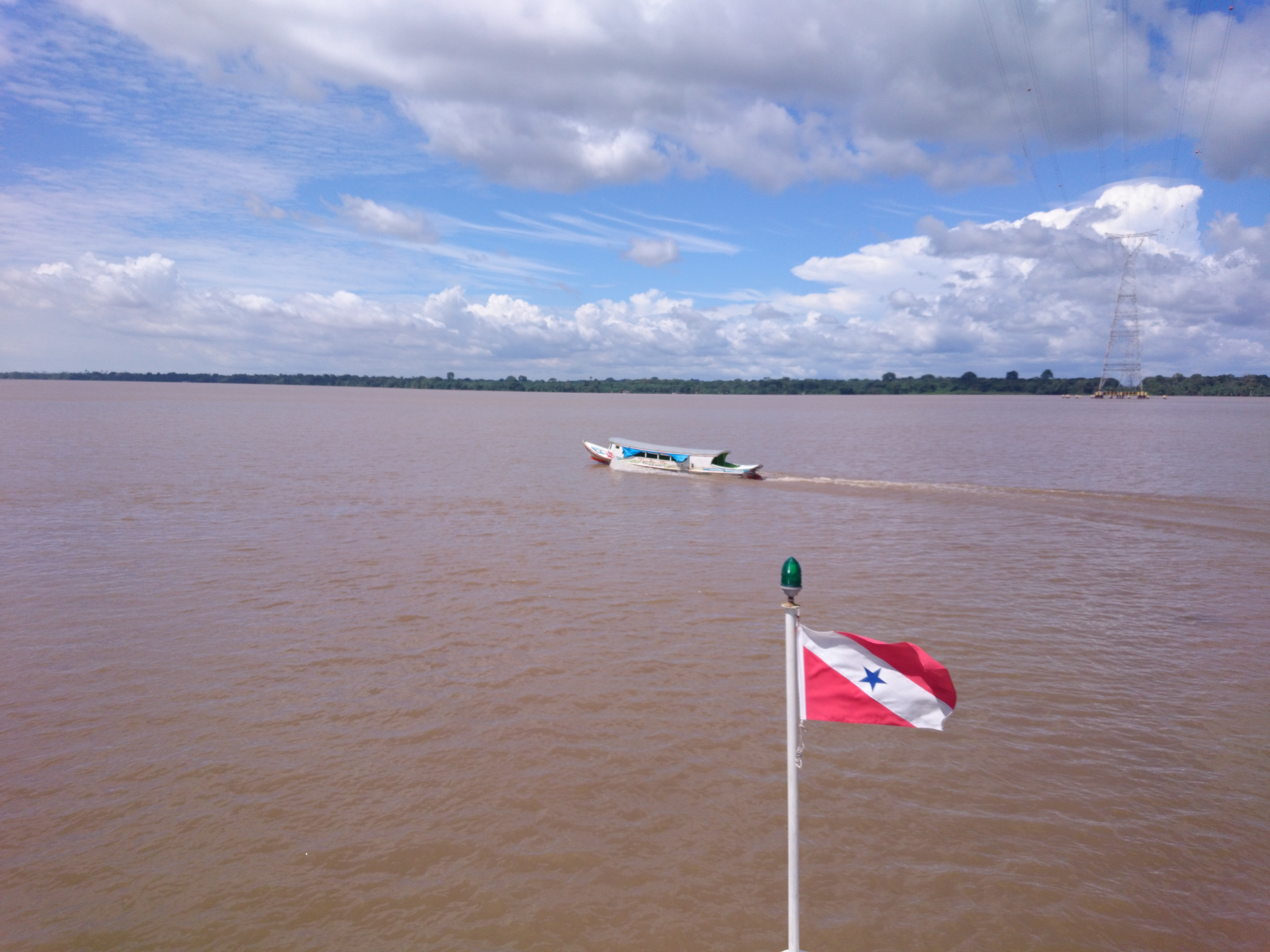

Location
- Country: Brazil
- State: Pará

Physical characteristics
- Mouth: Pará River
  - coordinates: 1°32′S 48°31′W
- Length: 390 km (240 mi)

The Acará River is a river of Pará state in north-central Brazil.

== See also ==
- List of rivers of Pará
