= Pará River =

River in the mouth of the Amazon and Tocantins River Basins in Brazil

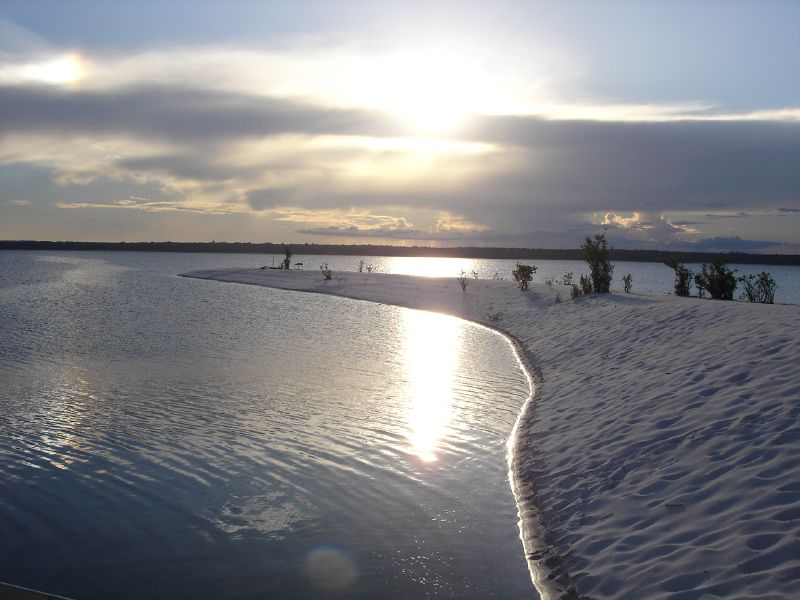
- View of the Pará River in Brazil

Location
- Country: Brazil

Physical characteristics
- Source
  - location: Confluence of Anapu and Pacajá, Pará state
  - coordinates: 1°54′27.6048″S 50°49′2.1396″W
  - elevation: 0.5 m (1 ft 8 in)
- 2nd source: Anapu
  - location: Carajás Mountains, Pará
  - coordinates: 4°1′51.1032″S 51°13′53.112″W
  - elevation: 250 m (820 ft)
- 3rd source: Pacajá
  - location: Carajás Mountains, Pará
  - coordinates: 4°58′24.3624″S 50°46′40.7532″W
  - elevation: 233 m (764 ft)
- Mouth
  - location: Marajó Bay, Pará
  - coordinates: 0°25′48.234″S 48°8′41.4096″W
  - elevation: 0 m (0 ft)
- Length: 320 km (200 mi)(Pará–Anapu 784 km (487 mi)
- Basin size: 1,000,000 km^{2} (390,000 sq mi)
- Discharge
  - location: Atlantic Ocean (near mouth)
  - average: 20,946 m^{3}/s (739,700 cu ft/s) ~664 km^{3}/a (21,000 m^{3}/s) to 26,000 m^{3}/s (920,000 cu ft/s)
- Discharge
  - location: Confluence of Tocantins (141 km upstream of mouth; Basin size 84,027 km^{2} (32,443 sq mi)
  - average: 9,249 m^{3}/s (326,600 cu ft/s) to 10,000 m^{3}/s (350,000 cu ft/s)
- Discharge
  - location: Portel, Pará (320 km upstream of mouth; Basin size: 52,066.5 km^{2} (20,103.0 sq mi)
  - average: (Period: 1971–2000)2,206.7 m^{3}/s (77,930 cu ft/s)

Basin features
- Progression: → Atlantic Ocean
- Tributaries
  - left: Anapu, Breves channel, Arari
  - right: Pacajá, Jacundá, Tocantins, Acará, Guamá

The Pará River (Portuguese: Rio Pará), also called Parauaú River, Jacaré Grande River, Marajó River Channel, Macacos River Channel, Santa Maria River Channel and Bocas Bay, is a watercourse and immense estuarine complex that functions as a canal between the rivers Amazon (Amazon delta), Tocantins, Campina Grande (or Portel Bay) and Marajó Bay, in addition to numerous other smaller rivers. It can also be considered a distributary channel of the Tocantins River.

It is located in the state of Pará, Brazil. It presents muddy and turbid waters, rich in sediments originating from its source rivers.

Runs for approximately 64 kilometres (40 mi), around the west and south of the island of Marajó. Belém, the state capital of Pará, is located near the south bank of the river.

Previously academic research has come to consider this watercourse as a distributary channel of the Amazon River. However, this statement is currently considered unlikely, since recent studies have shown the small contribution of the waters of the Amazon River to the formation of the Pará River, with a greater contribution from the Tocantins River.

== See also ==
- List of rivers of Pará
