= Itacaiúnas River =

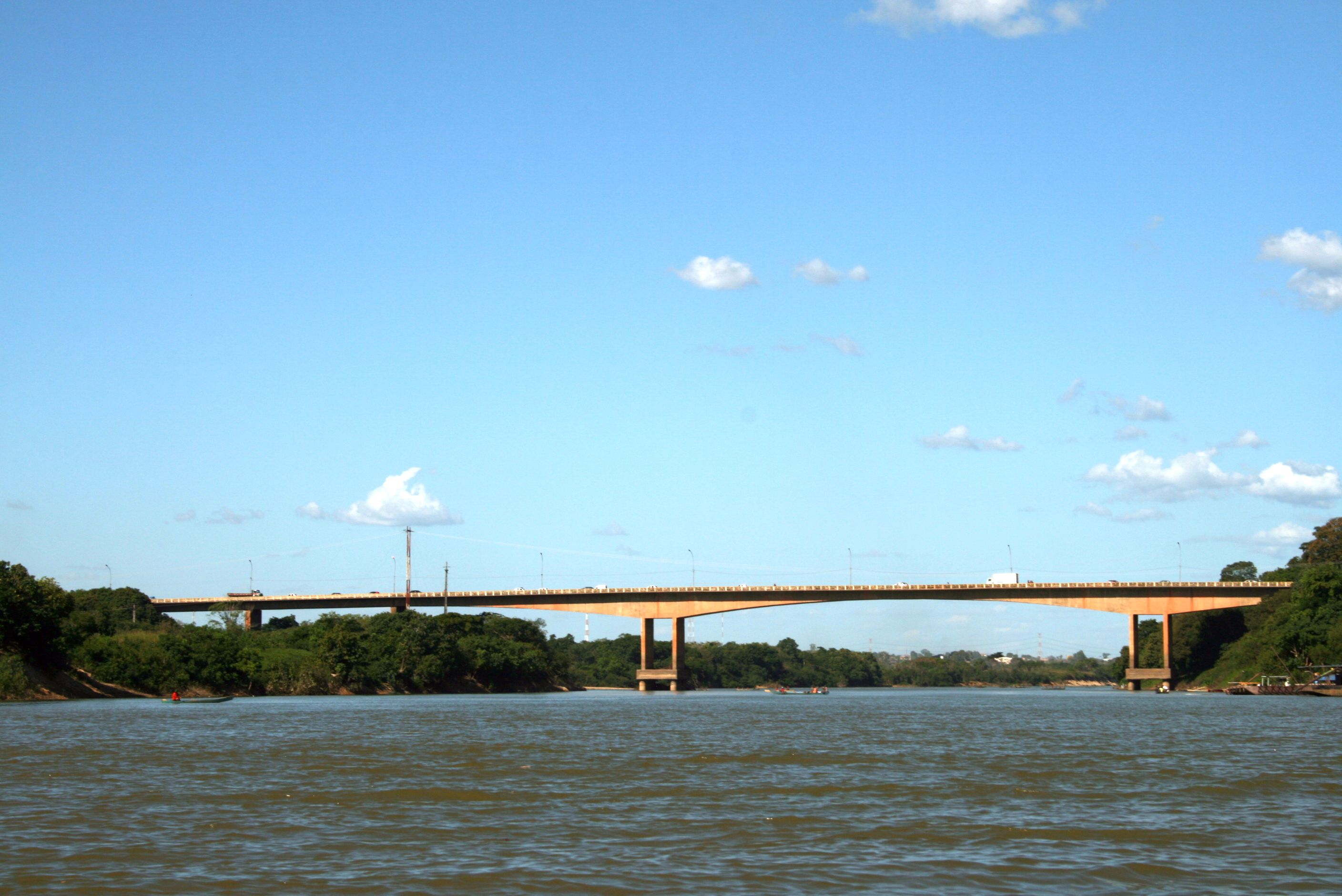

Location
- Country: Brazil
- State: Pará

Physical characteristics
- Mouth: Tocantins River
  - coordinates: 5°21′15″S 49°08′45″W
- Length: 600 km (370 mi)
- Basin size: 41,418 km^{2} (15,992 sq mi)
- Discharge
  - location: Mouth
  - average: 750 m^{3}/s (26,000 cu ft/s)

Basin features
- River system: Tocantins basin

The Itacaiúnas River is a river of Pará state in north-central Brazil.

Part of the river basin is in the Tapirapé-Aquiri National Forest, a 196,504 hours (707,410 ks) sustainable use conservation unit created in 1989.

== See also ==
- List of rivers of Pará
