= Tapajós–Xingu moist forests =

Ecoregion in Brazil

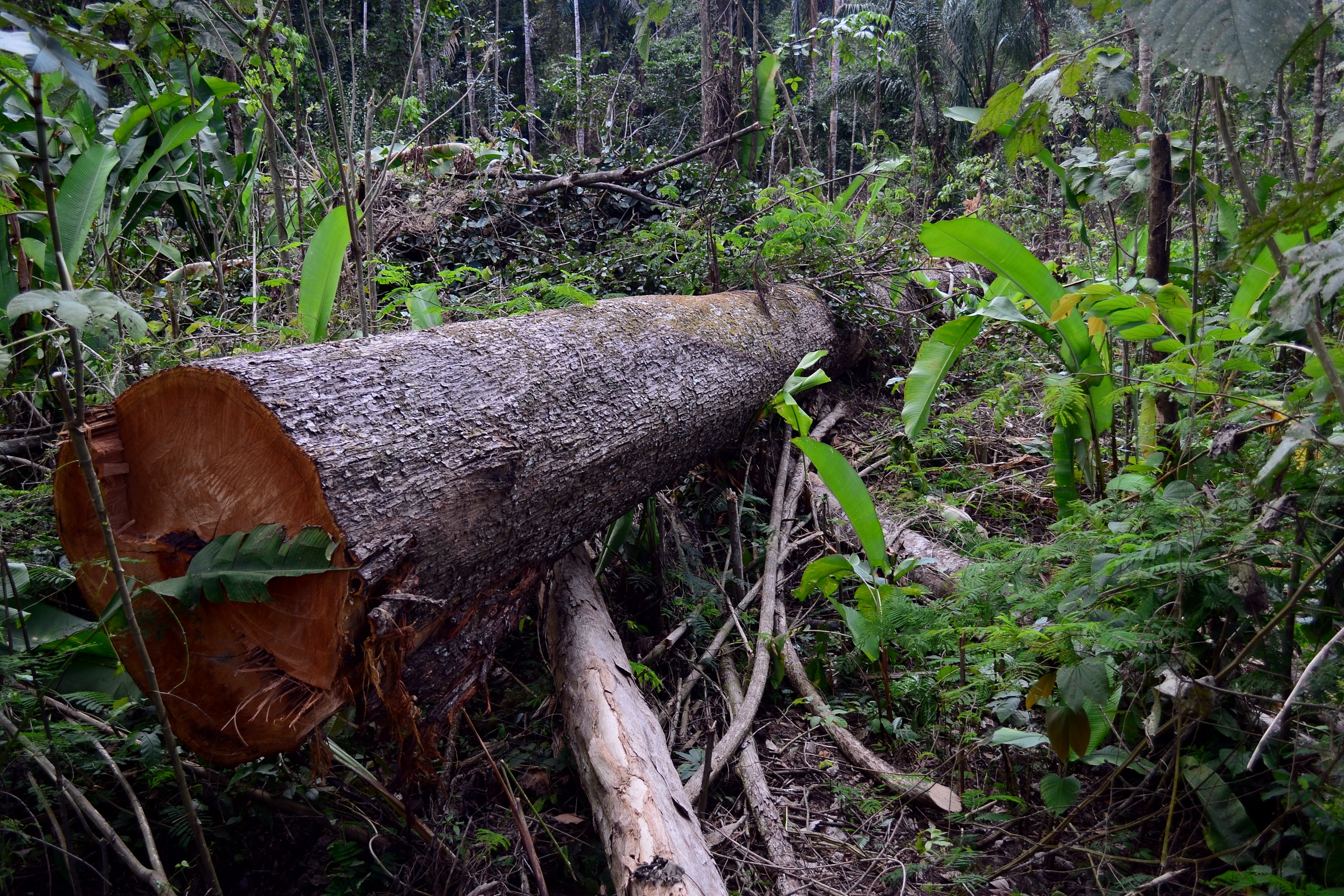
- Trunk felled by deforesters in Jamanxim National Forest Novo Progresso, Pará.

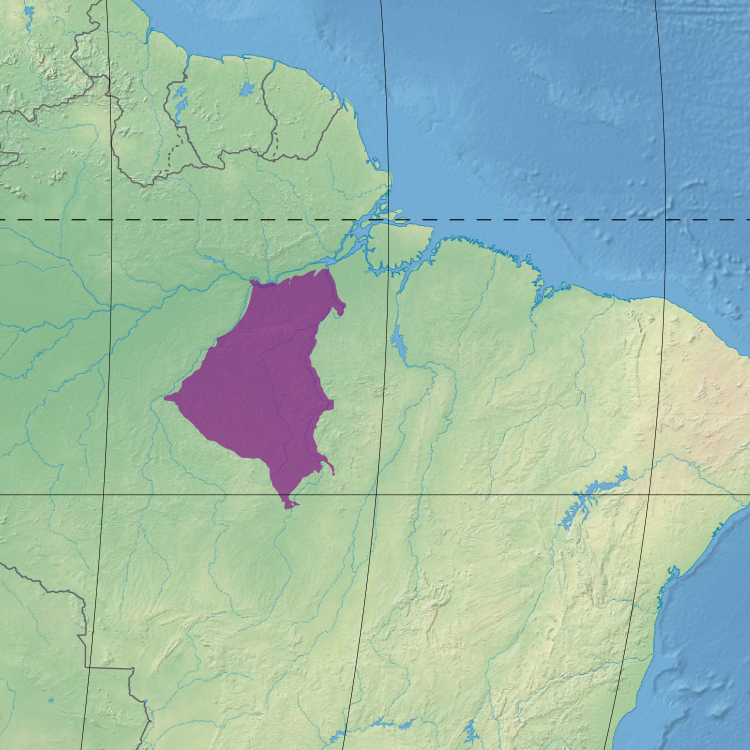
- Ecoregion territory (in purple)

Ecology
- Realm: Neotropical
- Biome: Tropical and subtropical moist broadleaf forests – Amazon

Geography
- Country: Brazil
- Coordinates: 5.910°S 54.437°W

The Tapajós–Xingu moist forests (NT0168) is an ecoregion in the eastern Amazon basin. It is part of the Amazon biome. The ecoregion extends southwest from the Amazon River between its large Tapajós and Xingu tributaries.

== Location ==
The Tapajós–Xingu moist forests lie between the Tapajós river to the west and the Xingu rivers to the east, tributaries of the Amazon River to the north. They have an area of 336,698.45 square kilometres (130,000.00 sq mi). The rivers act as barriers to the movement of plants, animals and insects to and from adjacent regions. In the south the rugged Serra do Cachimbo divides the ecoregion from other moist forest areas. There are urban centers at Santarém at the mouth of the Tapajós, Aveiro on the lower Tapajós and Altamira on the Iriri River. The ecoregion is crossed the BR-009 and BR-600 highways and by the Rio Novo and Amazônia National Parks.

To the northwest the ecoregion adjoins the Madeira–Tapajós moist forests on the other side of the Tapajós River. To the north it adjoins the Gurupa várzea along the Amazon River. The Uatuma–Trombetas moist forests are on the opposite bank of the Amazon. To the east are the Xingu–Tocantins–Araguaia moist forests. To the south and southwest the ecoregion blends into the Mato Grosso seasonal forests ecoregion.

== Physical ==
Elevations range from 5 metres (16 ft) above sea level along the Amazon to 198 metres (650 ft) in the south. The ecoregion mostly lies on the undulating terrain of the ancient Brazilian Shield. Soils are often rich in nutrients, but poor soils are found in the higher areas. The main rivers are blackwater, with little or no suspended sediment. The largest is the Iriri, a tributary of the Xingu. Others are the Jamanxim, Curuá, Crepori, Curuá Una, and Jaraucu.

== Climate ==
The Köppen climate classification is "Am": equatorial, monsoonal. Temperatures are fairly uniform throughout the year, slightly cooler in July and slightly warmer in April. They range from 21.5 °C (70.7 °F) to 32.5 °C (90.5 °F), with a mean of just under 27 °C (81 °F). Annual rainfall is 1,524 to 2,032 millimetres (60.0 to 80.0 in). Monthly rainfall ranges from 37.7 millimetres (1.48 in) in July to 313.9 millimetres (12.36 in) in February, with rain falling on about 240 days of each year.

== Ecology ==
The ecoregion is in the Neotropical realm and the tropical and subtropical moist broadleaf forests biome.

=== Flora ===
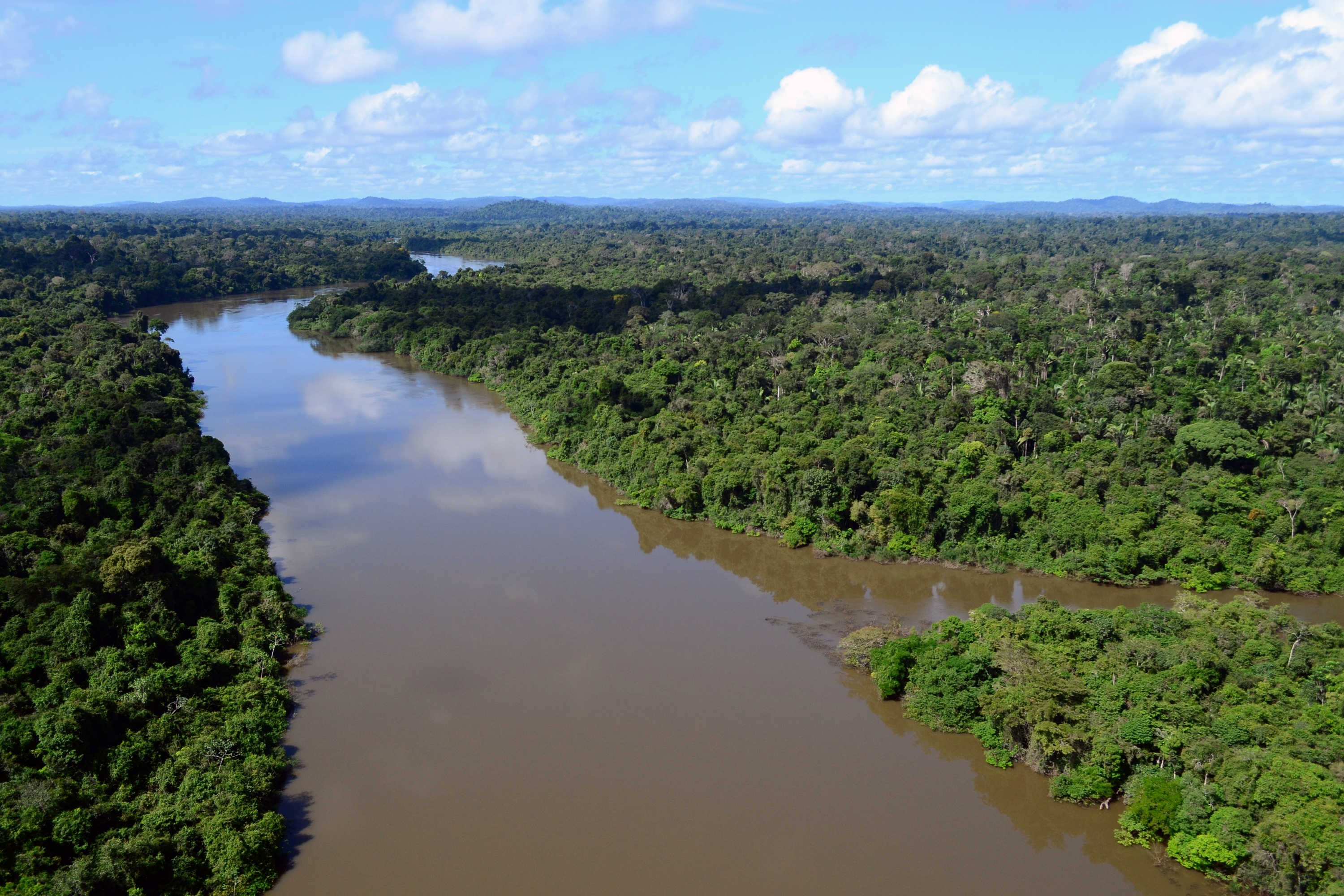
Jamanxim River from the air

The regions with rich soil have diverse flora and fauna with many endemic species. Mostly the forests are evergreen tropical rainforest on terra firme, not subject to flooding. There is lowland forest along the Amazon River. Further south the forest is submontane, open canopy forest with patches of dense forest. Where the blackwater rivers flood they create igapó forests. An unusual form of forest with many large lianas at all levels is found on the higher land in the south and southeast of the ecoregion. Typically these forests are found on richer soils, and have a canopy under 25 metres (82 ft), lower than the canopy of the humid terra firme forest.

Lianas belong to the families Bignoniaceae, Fabaceae, Hippocrateaceae, Menispermaceae, Sapindaceae and Malpighiaceae. Large trees in the liana forests include Apuleia molaris, Bagassa guianensis, Caryocar villosum, Hymenaea parvifolia, Tetragastris altissima, Astronium graveolens, Astronium lecointei, Apuleia leiocarpa, Sapium marmieri, Acacia polyphylla, Elizabetha species, Brazil nut (Bertholletia excelsa) and mahogany (Swietenia macrophylla). Endemic trees and lianas include Cenostigma tocantinum, Ziziphus itacaiunensis and Bauhinia bombaciflora. Common trees in eastern Pará that are not found to the west of the Tapajós include Zollernia paraensi, cupuaçu (Theobroma grandiflorum) and Cordia goeldiana. The predominant white-sand igapó forest along the clearwater Tapajós holds species of the family Myrtaceae and trees such as Triplaris surinamensis, Piranhea trifoliata, Copaifera martii, Alchornea castaneifolia and Handroanthus heptaphyllus.

=== Fauna ===
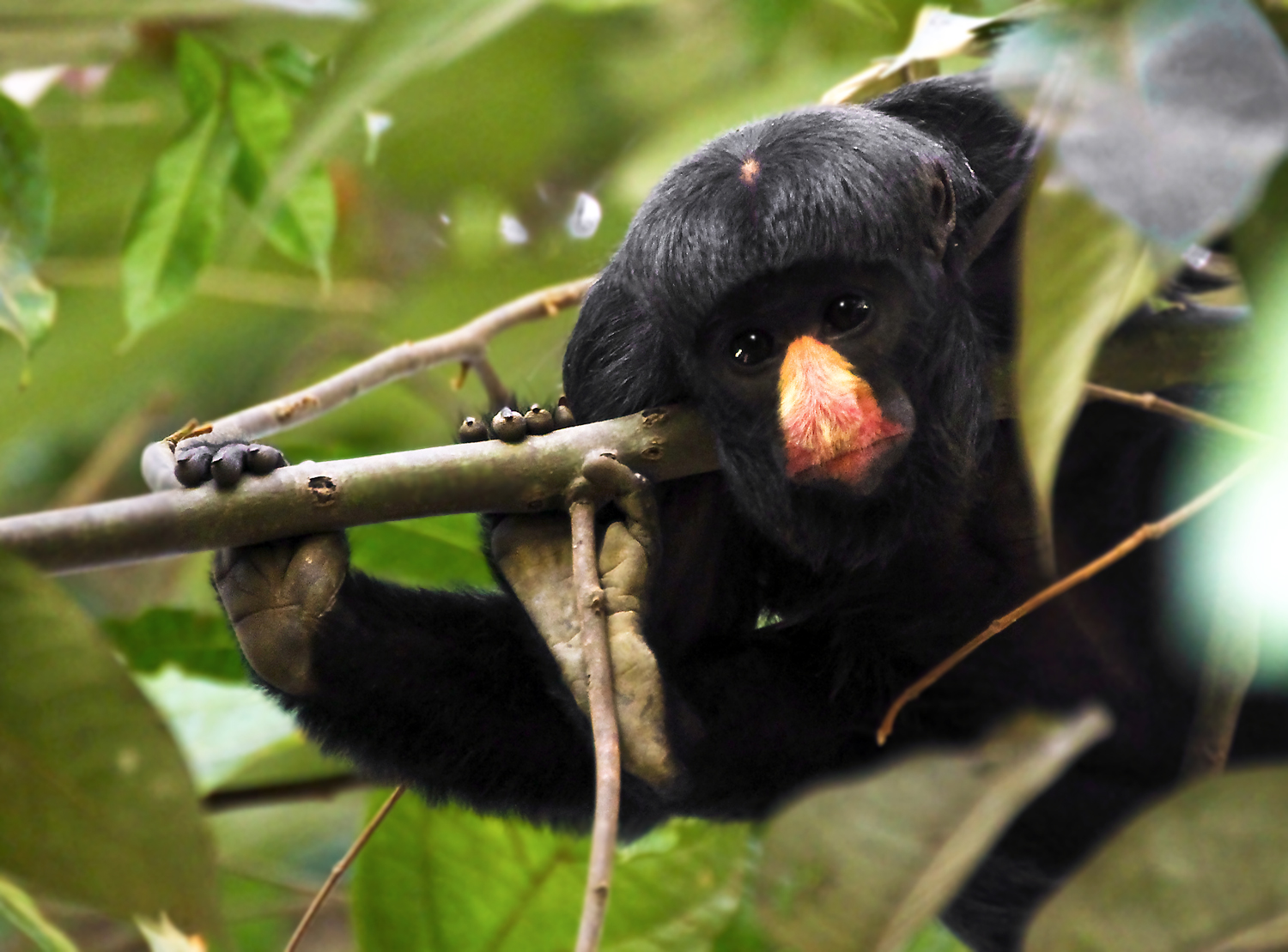
White-nosed saki (Chiropotes albinasus)

161 species of mammals have been recorded. The white-nosed saki (Chiropotes albinasus) occurs only to the east of the Tapajós. Other mammals are the red-bellied titi (Callicebus moloch), Azara's night monkey (Aotus azarae infulatus), white-cheeked spider monkey (Ateles marginatus), white-lipped peccary (Tayassu pecari), collared peccary (Pecari tajacu), cougar (Puma concolor), jaguar (Panthera onca), South American tapir (Tapirus terrestris), and brocket deer (Mazama genus). The rivers are home to spectacled caiman (Caiman crocodilus), black caiman (Melanosuchus niger), yellow-spotted river turtle (Podocnemis unifilis), Amazonian manatee (Trichechus inunguis), Amazon river dolphin (Inia geoffrensis) and tucuxi (Sotalia fluviatilis). Endangered mammals include the white-cheeked spider monkey (Ateles marginatus), white-nosed saki (Chiropotes albinasus) and giant otter (Pteronura brasiliensis).

556 species of birds have been recorded. These include osprey (Pandion haliaetus), harpy eagle (Harpia harpyja), channel-billed toucan (Ramphastos vitellinus), little chachalaca (Ortalis motmot), nine tinamou species (genera Crypturellus and Tinamus), seven macaw species (genus Ara) including hyacinth macaw (Anodorhynchus hyacinthinus), many parakeets (genera Aratinga, Pyrrhura and Brotogeris), parrots (genera Amazona and Pionus) and the hoatzin (Opisthocomus hoazin). Endangered birds include the red-necked aracari (Pteroglossus bitorquatus).

== Status ==
The World Wildlife Fund classes the ecoregion as "Vulnerable". The Tapajós–Xingu, Xingu–Tocantins–Araguaia, and Tocantins–Araguaia–Maranhão moist forest ecoregions on the eastern edge of the Amazon basin have all been badly affected by human settlement and deforestation. Roads have opened the region to rapid and uncontrolled growth of colonies, logging, ranching and major projects that have destroyed large areas of forest and degraded the land. The remaining forests are threatened by large and uncontrolled man-made fires. Miners seeking gold and other mineral pollute the rivers with chemicals. During the period from 2004 to 2011 the ecoregion experienced an annual rate of habitat loss of 0.38%. Global warming will force tropical species to migrate uphill to find areas with suitable temperature and rainfall. Low, flat, deforested ecoregions such as the Tapajós–Xingu moist forests are extremely vulnerable.

The Amazônia National Park protects both sides of the Tapajós near Itaituba, with an area of 9,935 square kilometres (3,836 sq mi), but it is underfunded. The Tapajós National Forest does little to protect the forests near Aveiro.

== Sources ==
- "Amazon Basin Ecoregions", Global Forest Atlas, Yale, archived from the original on 2021-01-23
- Coca-Castro, Alejandro; Reymondin, Louis; Bellfield, Helen; Hyman, Glenn (January 2013), Land use Status and Trends in Amazonia (PDF), Amazonia Security Agenda Project, archived from the original (PDF) on 2016-03-19
- Feeley, Kenneth J.; Rehm, Evan (2013), Amazon’s vulnerability to climate change heightened by deforestation and man-made dispersal barriers (PDF), Miami, FL: Florida International University, archived from the original (PDF) on 2017-04-04
- Sears, Robin, Amazon Basin - Brazil (NT0168), WWF: World Wildlife Fund
- "Tapajós-Xingu moist forests", Global Species, Myers Enterprises II
- WildFinder, WWF: World Wildlife Fund
