= Madeira–Tapajós moist forests =

Ecoregion in the Amazon

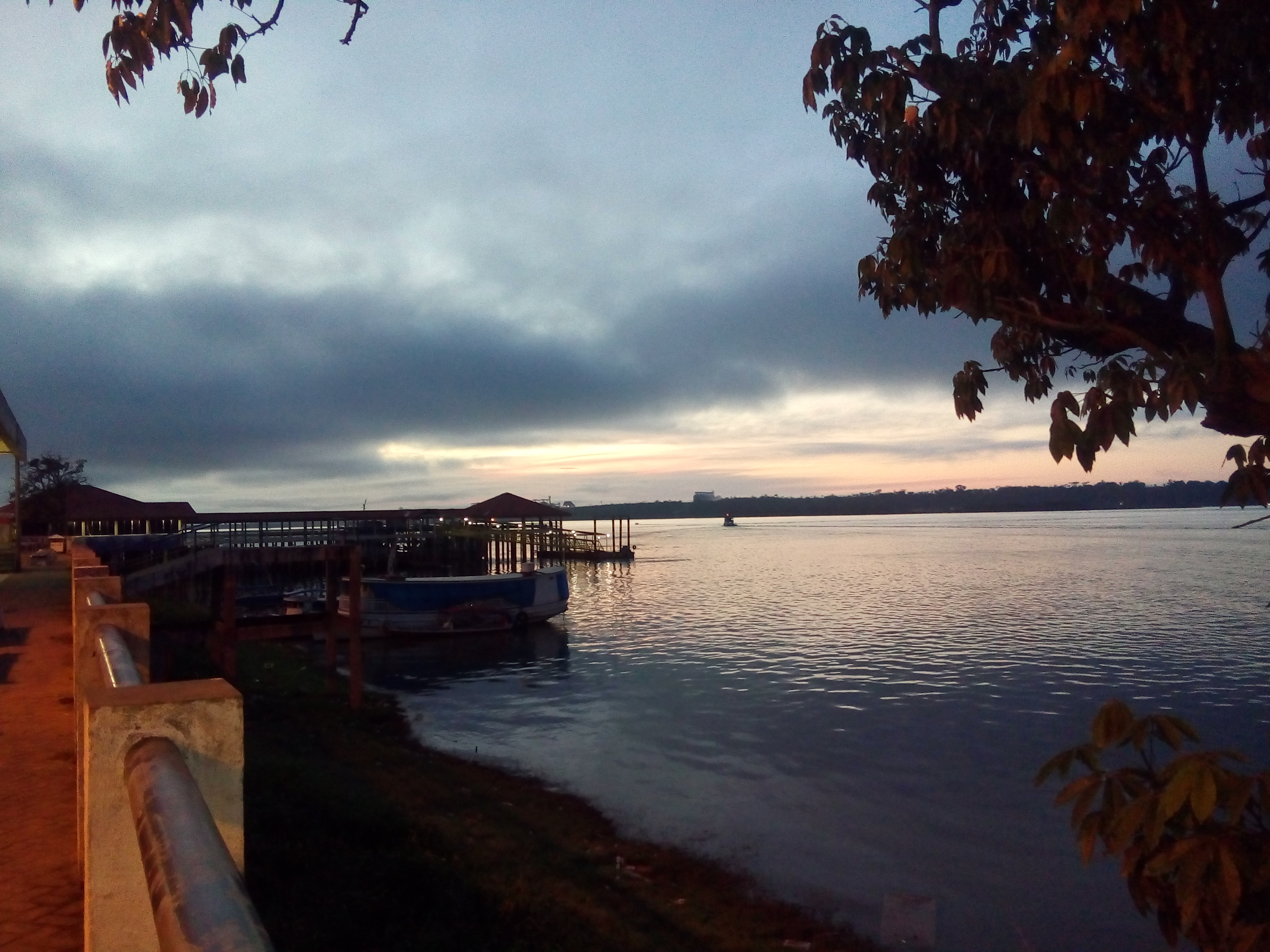
- Tapajós river at Itaituba, Pará

- Location in Brazil and Bolivia

Ecology
- Realm: Neotropical
- Biome: Tropical and subtropical moist broadleaf forests – Amazon

Geography
- Area: 719,757.69 km^{2} (277,900.00 sq mi)
- Country: Brazil, Bolivia
- Coordinates: 8.764°S 61.605°W

The Madeira–Tapajós moist forests (NT0135) is an ecoregion in the Amazon basin. It is part of the Amazon biome. The ecoregion extends southwest from the Amazon River between its large Madeira and Tapajós tributaries, and crosses the border into Bolivia. In the south it transitions into the cerrado biome of Mato Grosso. In the state of Rondônia it contains some of the most degraded land of the Amazon basin.

== Location ==
The Madeira–Tapajós moist forests cover an area of 71,975,769 hectares (177,856,000 acres). They stretch in a southwest direction through Brazil from the Amazon into northeast Bolivia. The ecoregion covers parts of the states of Amazonas, Rondônia and Mato Grosso in Brazil, and part of the Beni Department in Bolivia.

The ecoregion covers the interfluvial region between the Madeira River to the west and the Tapajós rivers to the east, two large tributaries of the Amazon to the north. Above the sources of the Tapajós the ecoregion extends south to the Guaporé River basin. The large rivers prevent the spread of flora and fauna. Thus the white-fronted capuchin (Cebus albifrons) and hairy saki (Pithecia hirsuta) are found west of the Tapajós, while the white-nosed saki (Chiropotes albinasus) is only found east of the river. In the south the bounds of the ecoregion are defined by distinct changes in vegetation, with the transition to Mato Grosso tropical dry forests in the southeast and to the Beni savanna and later the Chiquitano dry forests in the southeast.

To the northwest the ecoregion is separated from the Purus-Madeira moist forests by the Madeira River, which has Monte Alegre várzea along much of its length. The várzea extends along the Amazon River on the north of the ecoregion. To the east it is separated by the Tapajós river from the Tapajós–Xingu moist forests ecoregion. Further south along its southeast boundary it adjoins the Mato Grosso seasonal forests, Cerrado and Chiquitano dry forests ecoregions. In the southwest it adjoins the Southwest Amazon moist forests and Beni savanna ecoregions.

== Physical ==
Most of the ecoregion is below 200 metres (660 ft) in elevation. At its northern boundary on the Amazon river the elevation is 20 metres (66 ft) above sea level. The ecoregion south of the river covers part of the low, flat Amazon basin, and rises gradually to the south and east to uplifted parts of the old Brazilian Shield. The southern part of the ecoregion contains the mountainous Parecis plateau (Chapada dos Parecis). The land rises to 1,126 metres (3,694 ft) at the tallest peak of the Parecis plateau. (Note: The highest point of the Chapada dos Parecis is the 1,126 metres (3,694 ft) Pico do Tracuá.) The terrain here consists of table mountains with rocky meadows and semi-deciduous open submontane forest and woodland savanna.

The Madeira River is a sediment-rich whitewater river. The clearwater Tapajós, which rises in the ancient and well-weathered Brazilian Shield and follows a fixed course, does not carry sediment. Other large rivers in the region are the Maués Açu, Aripuanã and Canumã. The Parecis plateau's main rivers are the Ji-Paraná, Juruena, Papagaio, do Sangue and Guaporé.

== Ecology ==
The ecoregion is in the Neotropical realm and the tropical and subtropical moist broadleaf forests biome.

=== Climate ===
The Köppen climate classification is "Am" equatorial, monsoonal. Annual rainfall is 2,000 to 3,000 millimetres (79 to 118 in) in most of the region, with less than 2,000 millimetres (79 in) along the north and south boundaries. Along the middle Madeira rainfall increases to 4,000 millimetres (160 in). In the center of the region temperatures are relatively constant year round. They range from 21 to 32 °C (70 to 90 °F) and average 26 °C (79 °F). In the humid lowland areas temperatures average 27 °C (81 °F), while in the mountains they average 23 °C (73 °F).

=== Flora ===
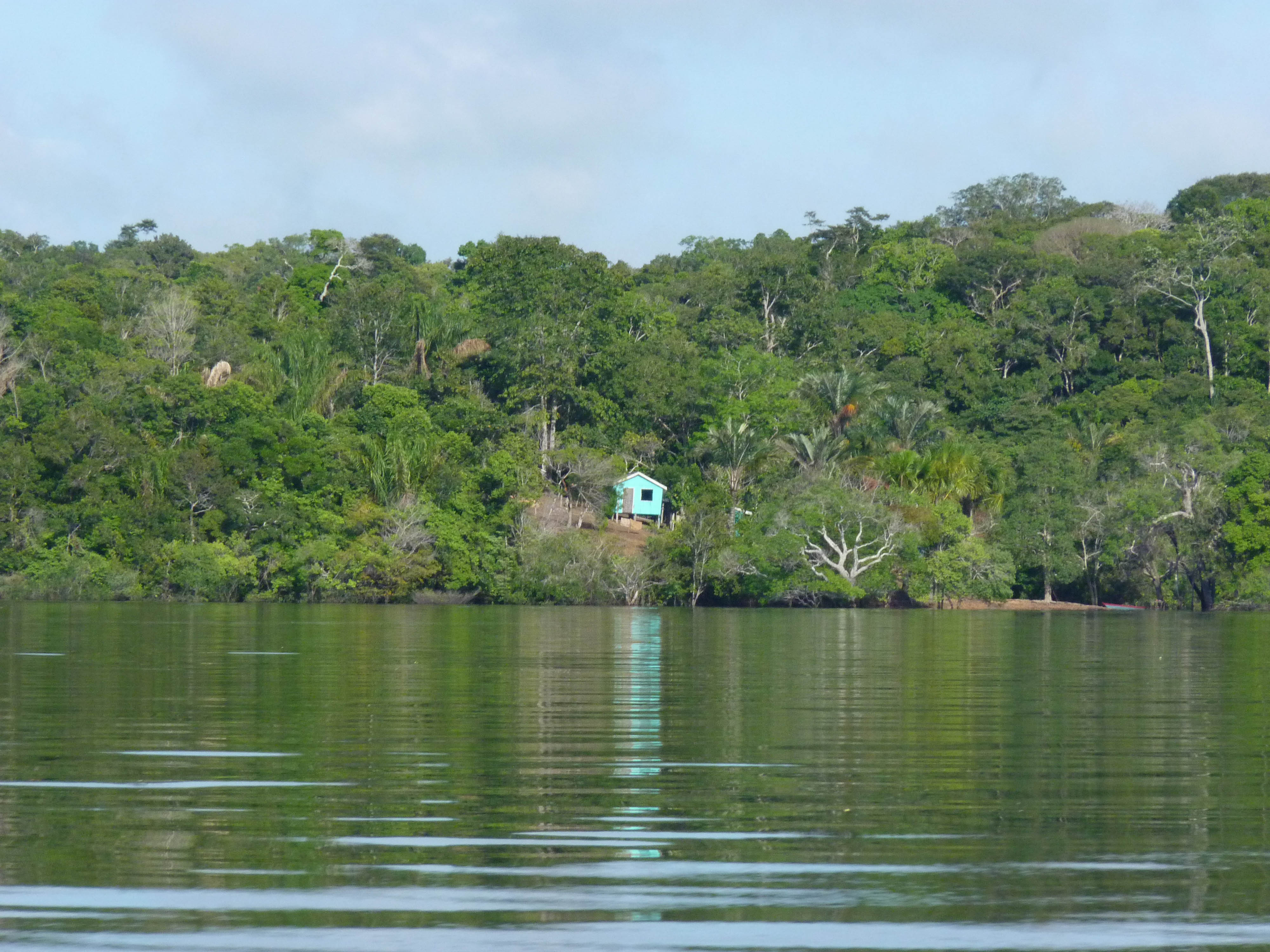
House in the Juruena National Park

Vegetation includes dense lowland rainforest, dense submontane rainforest, open submontane rainforest and woodland savanna. There is seasonally flooded várzea forest in the Monte Alegre Várzea ecoregion along Madeira. There is white sand flooded igapó forest along the clearwater Tapajós and Aripuanã rivers, with large trees such as Triplaris surinamensis, Piranhea trifoliata, Copaifera martii and Alchornea castaneifolia. The flooded forest is somewhat more open than the surrounding terra firme forest. On the upper Madeira and Tapajós there are large areas of campina, white sand grasslands.

The canopy in the dense lowland rainforest is around 30 metres (98 ft) high, with emergent trees reaching 45 metres (148 ft). Common trees include the legumes Eperua oleifera, Eperua campestris, Palovea brasiliensis, Elizabetha paraensis, Elizabetha bicolor, Elizabetha durissima and Coumarouna speciosa, as well as trees from other families such as Lophanthera lactescens, Polygala scleroxylon, Joannesia heveoides, Manilkara excelsa and Duckeodendron cestroides. At one time the endemic tree Polygonanthus amazonicus grew near Maués, the western limit for the emergent Dinizia excelsa and the eastern limit for the Theobroma cacao. The Tapajós basin is the eastern limit of Theobroma microcarpum. The Physocalymma scaberrima has red hardwood used by furniture makers. The montane forests of the upper Marmelos and middle Tapajós hold Hevea camporum, Euterpe longibracteata, Huberodendron ingens and Brachynema ramiflorum.

Further south in Mato Grosso there are forests in the transition between the Amazon and cerrado biomes.

=== Fauna ===
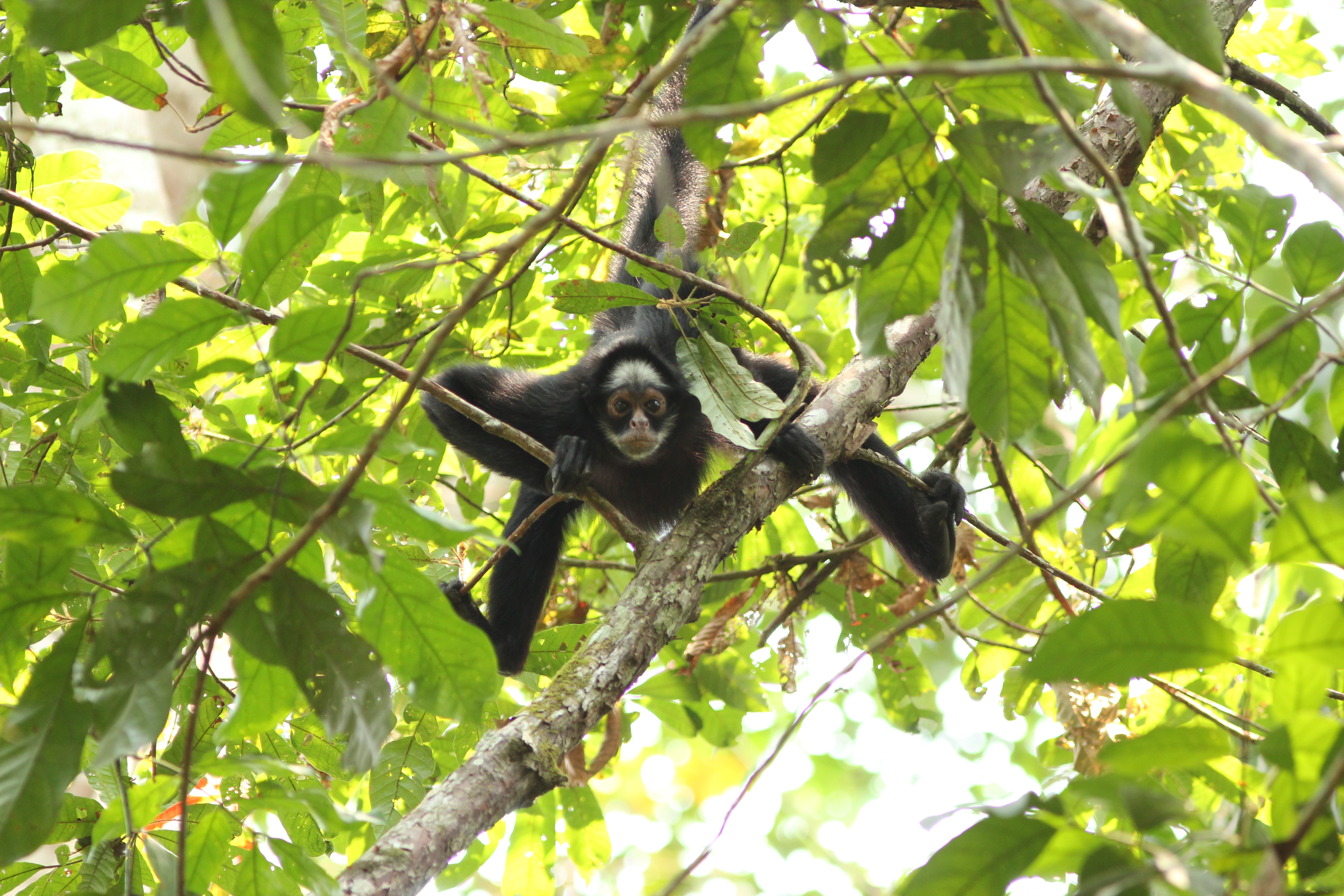
white-cheeked spider monkey (Ateles marginatus)

183 species of mammals have been reported, including 90 bat species and many primates. The ecoregion is the eastern limit of the brown woolly monkey (Lagothrix lagotricha). The Santarem marmoset (Mico humeralifer) is endemic to the north of the ecoregion. Roosmalens' dwarf marmoset (Callibella humilis) lives along the east bank of the Madeira and the western bank of the lower Aripuana. The bare-eared squirrel monkey (Saimiri ustus) and red-bellied titi (Callicebus moloch) are found only in the south-central Amazon. Other mammals include white-lipped peccary (Tayassu pecari), collared peccary (Pecari tajacu), cougar (Puma concolor), jaguar (Panthera onca), South American tapir (Tapirus terrestris) and brocket deer (Mazama genus). Endangered mammals include the white-cheeked spider monkey (Ateles marginatus), white-nosed saki (Chiropotes albinasus) and giant otter (Pteronura brasiliensis).

621 species of birds have been reported. These include several tinamous (Crypturellus and Tinamus genera), six macaws (Ara genus), many parakeets (Aratinga, Pyrrhura and Brotogeris genera), parrots (Amazona and Pionus genera) and hoatzin (Opisthocomus hoazin). Endangered birds include the red-necked aracari (Pteroglossus bitorquatus).

The rivers are home to black caiman (Melanosuchus niger), yellow-spotted river turtle (Podocnemis unifilis), Amazonian manatee (Trichechus inunguis), Amazon river dolphin (Inia geoffrensis) and tucuxi (Sotalia fluviatilis). Snakes include fer-de-lance (Bothrops asper), palm pit-vipers (Bothriechis genus), coral snakes (Micrurus genus), bushmasters (Lachesis muta) and boa constrictor (Boa constrictor). The neotropical rattlesnake (Crotalus durissus) is found in the dry uplands.

== Status ==
The World Wildlife Fund classes the ecoregion as Vulnerable. The main threats come from deforestation and colonization along the main rivers and the highways. During the period from 2004 to 2011 the ecoregion experienced an annual rate of habitat loss of 0.61%. Part of the ecoregion in central Rondônia is one of the most degraded areas of the central Amazon basin, with the forests cut down and the land degraded. This is worst along the BR-364 highway from Cuiabá to Porto Velho and the BR-319 from there to Humaitá and also occurs along the BR-230 Trans-Amazonian Highway from Humaitá to the middle Tapajós. The banks of the Tapajós and Madeira have large areas that are scarred by large-scale illegal mining. Conservation units such as the Amazônia National Park and Pacaás Novos National Park are underfunded and poorly protected.

== Sources ==
- Coca-Castro, Alejandro; Reymondin, Louis; Bellfield, Helen; Hyman, Glenn (January 2013), Land use Status and Trends in Amazonia (PDF), Amazonia Security Agenda Project, archived from the original (PDF) on 2016-03-19
- "Madeira-Tapajós moist forests", Global Species, Myers Enterprises II
- Sears, Robin, Central Amazonia in Brazil and parts of Bolivia (NT0135), WWF: World Wildlife Fund
- WildFinder, WWF: World Wildlife Fund
