= Xingu–Tocantins–Araguaia moist forests =

Ecoregion in Brazil

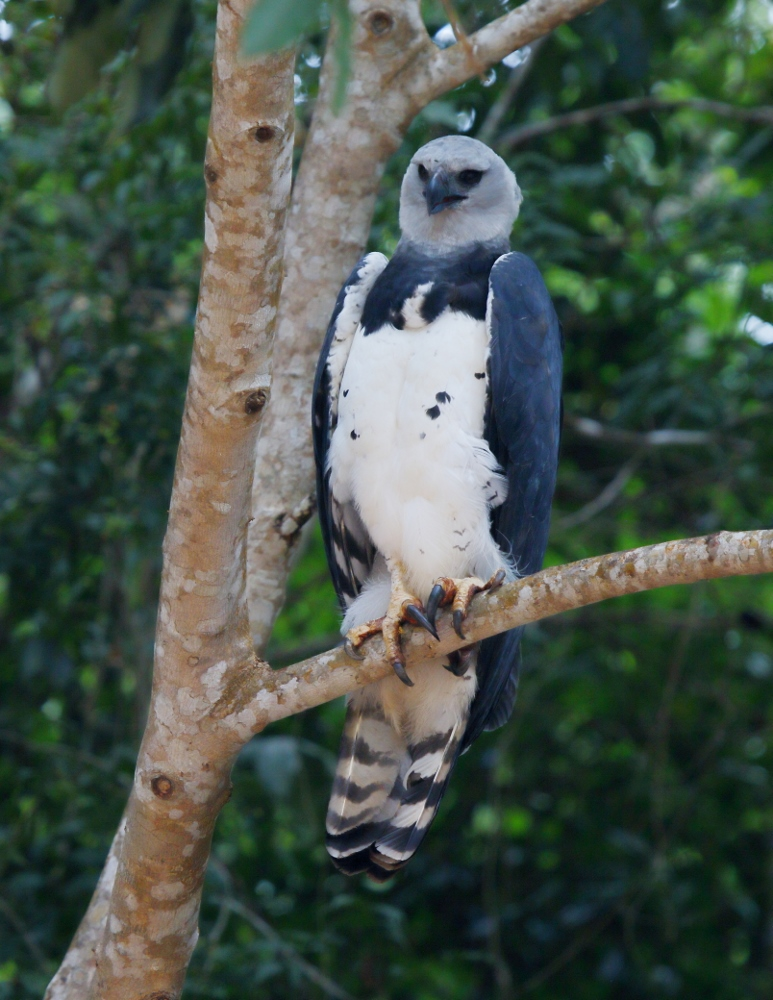
- Harpy eagle in Carajás National Forest

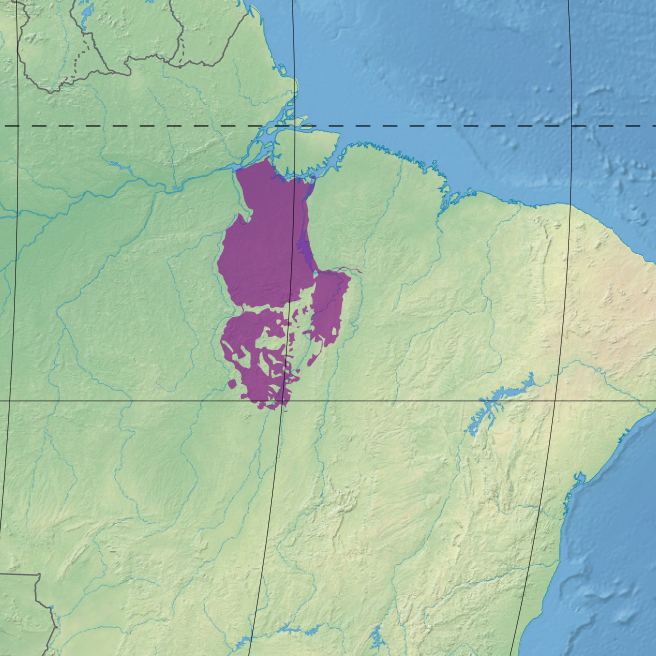
- Ecoregion territory (in purple)

Ecology
- Realm: Neotropical
- Biome: tropical and subtropical moist broadleaf forests – Amazon

Geography
- Area: 266,250.77 km^{2} (102,800.00 sq mi)
- Country: Brazil
- Coordinates: 4.711°S 50.859°W

The Xingu–Tocantins–Araguaia moist forests (NT0180) is an ecoregion in the eastern Amazon basin. It is part of the Amazon biome. The ecoregion is one of the most severely degraded of the Amazon region, suffering from large-scale deforestation and selective extraction of timber, particularly along the Trans-Amazonian Highway and in the higher and more populated southern portions.

== Location ==
The Xingu–Tocantins–Araguaia moist forests ecoregion has an area of 26,625,077 hectares (65,792,000 acres). It lies to the south of the Amazon River in eastern Brazil. The Xingu River defines the western boundary and the Tocantins River defines the eastern boundary. To the south the ecoregion rises into the Carajás Mountains, where it becomes interspersed with areas of seasonal forest and cerrado. Population centers include São Félix do Xingu on the Xingu, Porto de Moz, Oeiras do Pará and Gurupá on the Amazon, and Marabá on the Tocantins.

The Marajó várzea at the mouth of the Amazon lies to the north. To the west, on the other side of the Xingu River, is the Tapajós–Xingu moist forests. To the northeast is the Tocantins–Araguaia–Maranhão moist forests. To the southeast and south the ecoregion blends into the Mato Grosso seasonal forests ecoregion, and in some places directly adjoins the Cerrado ecoregion.

== Physical ==
The terrain is undulating. In many areas the soils are rich, but in some parts they are low in nutrients. The north of the ecoregion is on the lowland Amazon basin, while in the south it rises into the higher ground of the Brazilian Shield. Elevations range from sea level at the Amazon to 396 metres (1,299 ft) in the Carajás Mountains in the south.

The forest contains a network of blackwater rivers, stained dark with tannins and holding little suspended sediment. It contains the middle and lower basin of the Araguaia River, a tributary of the Tocantins. There are many smaller blackwater rivers including the Pacajá and Anapu tributaries of the Amazon River, the Bacajá and Fresco tributaries of the Xingu, and the Parauapebas and Catete tributaries of the Tocantins.

== Ecology ==
The ecoregion is in the Neotropical realm and the tropical and subtropical moist broadleaf forests biome.

=== Climate ===
The Köppen climate classification is "Am": equatorial, monsoonal. Temperatures are fairly steady throughout the year, slightly higher in April and slightly lower in July. Average temperatures range from 21 to 32 °C (70 to 90 °F), with a mean of 26.5 °C (79.7 °F). The region is drier than the ecoregions further to the west. In the middle Xingu annual rainfall is 1,500 to 2,000 millimetres (59 to 79 in). Elsewhere average annual precipitation is about 2,100 millimetres (83 in) Monthly precipitation ranges from 19.4 millimetres (0.76 in) in July to 335.4 millimetres (13.20 in) in March.

=== Flora ===
The diverse terrain results in diverse flora and fauna, particularly on the richer soils, with many endemic species. Most of the original vegetation is evergreen tropical rainforest on terra firme. In the north there is lowland Amazon forest up to 40 metres (130 ft) high, graduating to dense submontane forest and then open submontane forest further south. There are fewer epiphytes and orchids in these forests than in the ecoregions further west. There are areas of liana forests on higher ground in the south and southeast and of forests dominated by babaçu palm (Attalea genus) and/or Brazil nut (Bertholletia excelsa). The stands of babaçu palms are thought to be originally planted by humans. The blackwater river banks are lined with white-sand igapó flooded forests. In the south the ecoregion is broken up by areas of savanna woodlands from the cerrado biome of the Central Brazilian Plateau.

The liana forests cover large areas of comparatively rich soil. They are more open than the humid terra firme forest, with a lower canopy of 25 metres (82 ft) or less. They contain many huge lianas at all levels from the families Bignoniaceae, Fabaceae, Hippocrateaceae, Menispermaceae, Sapindaceae, and Malpighiaceae. They also hold large trees including Apuleia molaris, Bagassa guianensis, Caryocar villosum, Hymenaea parvifolia, Tetragastris altissima, Astronium graveolens, Astronium lecointei, Apuleia leiocarpa var. molaris, Sapium marmieri, Acacia polyphylla and Elizabetha. There are many endemic species such as Cenostigma tocantinum, Ziziphus itacaiunensis and Bauhinia bombaciflora. Typical trees in the middle Tocantins upland include Cenostigma tocantinum, Bombax tocantimumi, Bombax macrocalyx, Matisia bicolor, Strychnos melinoniana and Strychnos solimoesana. Swietenia macrophylla is found in the moist areas.

=== Fauna ===
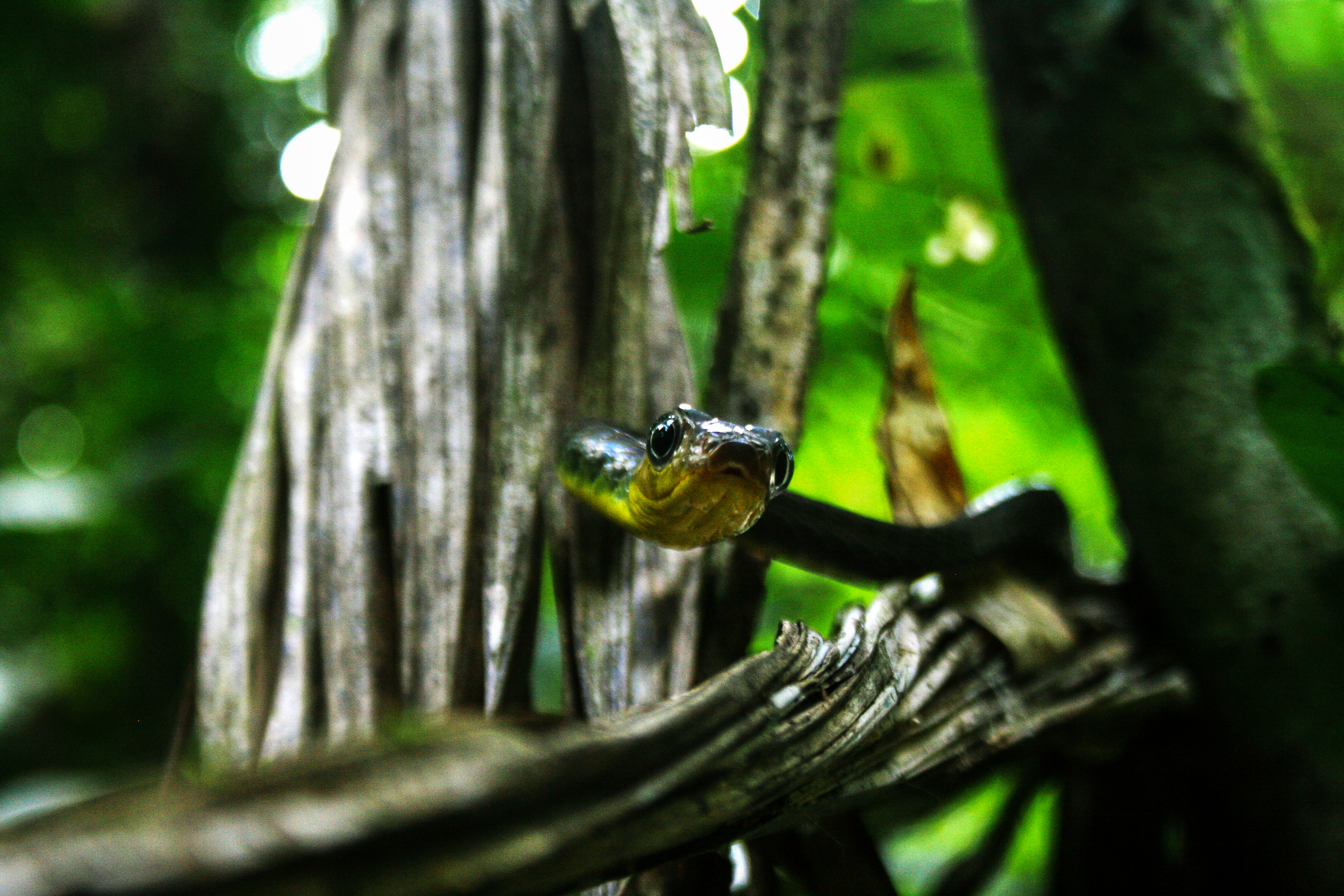
Snake of genus Chironius in Carajás

There are 153 species of mammals, a relatively low number for the Amazon region. Of these 90 are bats and 21 are rodents. There are 8 species of primates including the white-nosed saki (Chiropotes albinasus), red-handed tamarin (Saguinus midas), red-bellied titi (Callicebus moloch), Azara's night monkey (Aotus azarae infulatus) and white-cheeked spider monkey (Ateles marginatus). The last two are endemic to this ecoregion and the Tapajós-Xingu moist forests to the west. Other species of mammals include white-lipped peccary (Tayassu pecari), collared peccary (Dicotyles tajacu), cougar (Puma concolor), jaguar (Panthera onca), South American tapir (Tapirus terrestris), brocket deer (genus Mazama), bare-tailed woolly opossum (Caluromys philander), and seven-banded armadillo (Dasypus septemcinctus). Endangered mammals include white-cheeked spider monkey (Ateles marginatus), black bearded saki (Chiropotes satanas) and giant otter (Pteronura brasiliensis).

527 species of birds have been recorded including many species of egret, heron, hawk and falcon along the rivers and meadows. Other birds include Brigida's woodcreeper (Hylexetastes perrotii brigidai), hyacinth macaw (Anodorhynchus hyacinthinus), scarlet macaw (Ara macao), many parrots (genera Amazona and Pionus) and parakeets (genera Aratinga, Pyrrhura and Brotogeris'). Endangered birds include the red-necked aracari (Pteroglossus bitorquatus) and yellow-bellied seedeater (Sporophila nigricollis).

The rivers are home to spectacled caimans (Caiman crocodilus), black caimans (Melanosuchus niger), yellow-spotted river turtles (Podocnemis unifilis), Amazonian manatees (Trichechus inunguis), Amazon river dolphins (Inia geoffrensis) and tucuxis (Sotalia fluviatilis).

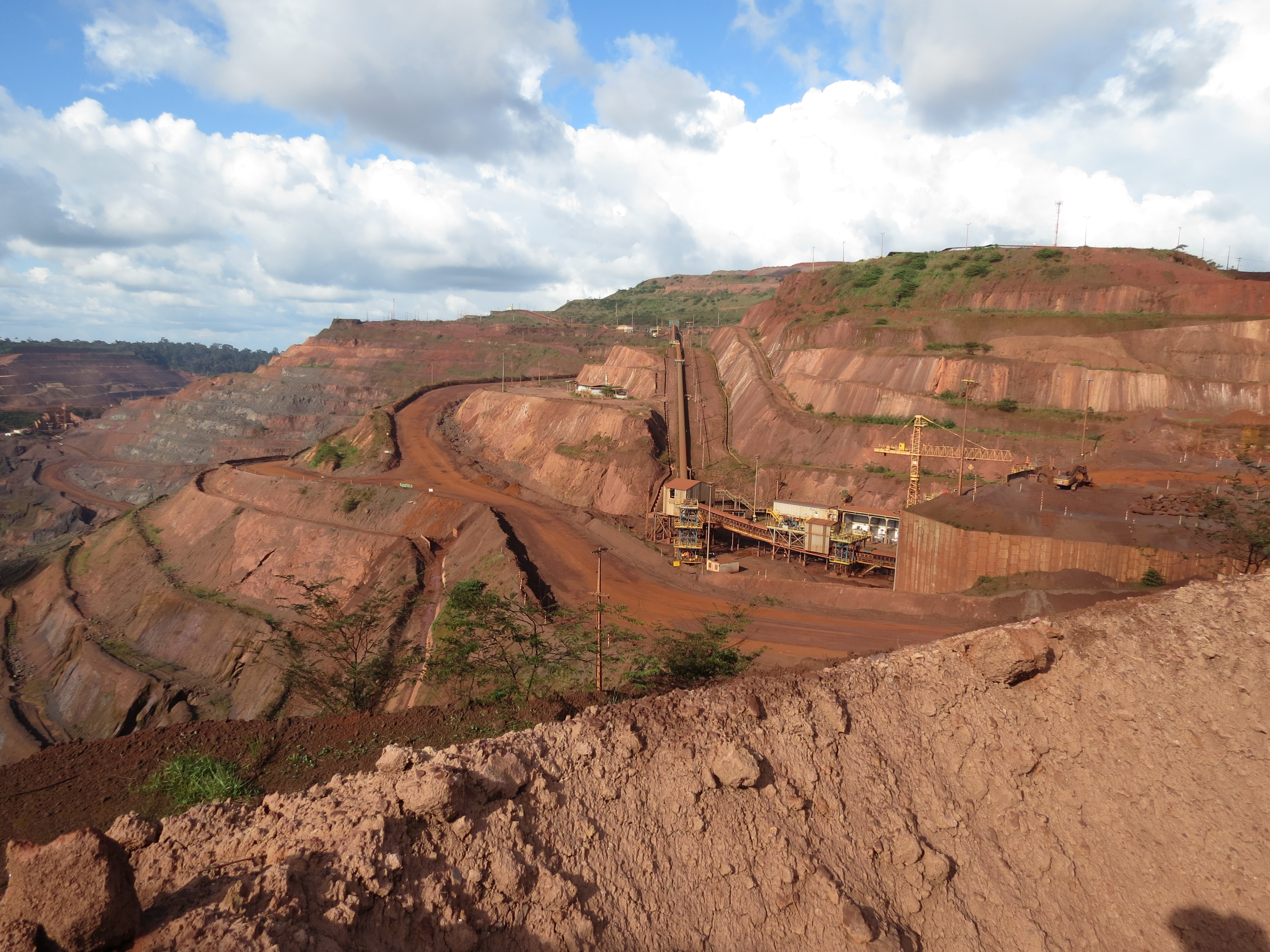
Carajás Mine in the Carajás Mountains

== Status ==
The World Wildlife Fund classes the ecoregion "Vulnerable". The Tapajós-Xingu, Xingu-Tocantins-Araguaia and Tocantins/Pindare moist forests ecoregions on the eastern edge of the Amazon basin have all been badly affected by human settlement and deforestation.

The Xingu-Tocantins-Araguaia region is the most deforested and degraded part of the Amazon region after the adjoining Tocantins/Pindare moist forests to the east. It is crossed by the Trans-Amazonian Highway (BR-230) from east to west, and by the BR-422 highway along the Tocantins. Most of the land along these roads has been deforested and replaced by pasture or farm fields. The remaining forest has been stripped of its valuable trees, and many native fauna and flora have become locally extinct. Large-scale mining near Marabá and elsewhere have directly affected the environment, and demand large quantities of wood to run the smelters.

During the period from 2004 to 2011 the ecoregion experienced an annual rate of habitat loss of 0.94%. Global warming will force tropical species to migrate uphill to find areas with suitable temperature and rainfall. Low, flat, deforested ecoregions such as the Xingu-Tocantins-Araguaia moist forests are extremely vulnerable.

Conservation units include the Tapirapé Biological Reserve and Tapirapé-Aquiri National Forest.

== Sources ==
- "Amazon Basin Ecoregions", Global Forest Atlas, Yale, archived from the original on 2021-01-23
- Coca-Castro, Alejandro; Reymondin, Louis; Bellfield, Helen; Hyman, Glenn (January 2013), Land use Status and Trends in Amazonia (PDF), Amazonia Security Agenda Project, archived from the original (PDF) on 2016-03-19
- Feeley, Kenneth J.; Rehm, Evan (2013), Amazon’s vulnerability to climate change heightened by deforestation and man-made dispersal barriers (PDF), Miami, FL: Florida International University, archived from the original (PDF) on 2017-04-04
- Sears, Robin, Eastern Amazonian - Brazil (NT0180), WWF: World Wildlife Fund
- WildFinder, WWF: World Wildlife Fund
- "Xingu-Tocantins-Araguaia moist forests", Global Species, Myers Enterprises II
