= Monte Alegre várzea =

Ecoregion in Brazil

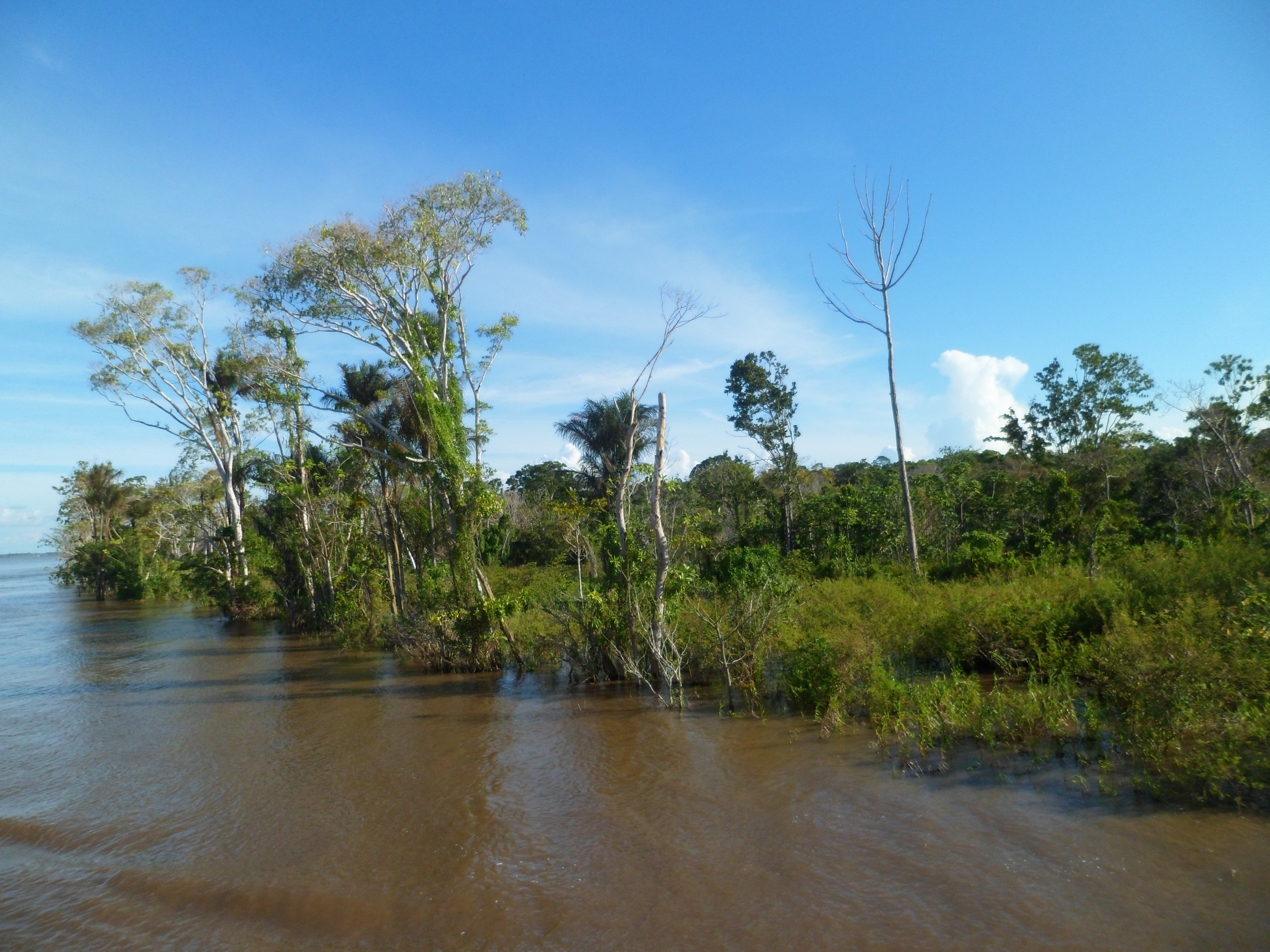
- Left bank of the Solimões at Careiro da Várzea

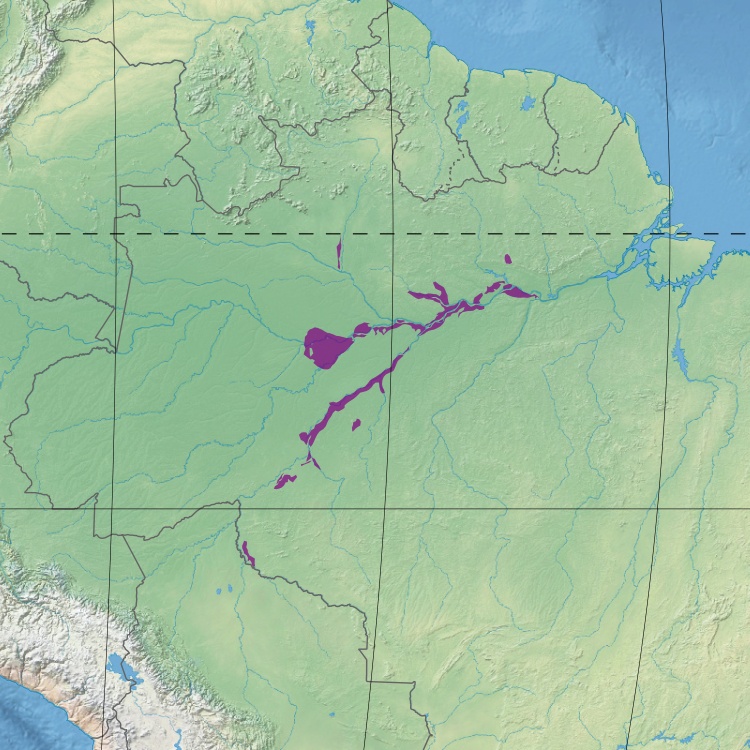
- Ecoregion territory (in purple)

Ecology
- Realm: Neotropical
- Biome: Tropical and subtropical moist broadleaf forests – Amazon

Geography
- Area: 66,821.69 km^{2} (25,800.00 sq mi)
- Country: Brazil
- Coordinates: 2.027°S 55.645°W

The Monte Alegre várzea (NT0141) is an ecoregion of seasonally flooded várzea forest along the Amazon River in the Amazon biome.

== Location ==
The várzea forests of this ecoregion extend along the low, seasonally flooded rivers of the central and lower basin of the Amazon River, including a large part of the Madeira River basin, the mouth of the Purus River, tributaries of these rivers and an isolated patch of várzea along the Mamoré River between Bolivia and Brazil. Major population centers in or near the ecoregion are Manaus, Itacoatiara, Coari and Óbidos.

The ecoregion adjoins the Madeira-Tapajós moist forests to the southeast and the Uatuma-Trombetas moist forests and Japurá-Solimões-Negro moist forests to the north. The Purus-Madeira moist forests lie to the west of the Madeira and the south of the Amazon. The Purus várzea is upstream along the Solimões and Purus rivers and their tributaries. The Gurupa várzea is downstream along the Amazon.

== Physical ==
Elevations range from 15 metres (49 ft) in the east, where the Tapajós meets the Amazon river, to 80 metres (260 ft) on the Madeira. The soils are fertile sediments formed in the present Holocene epoch, carried down from the Andes. The annual floods renew the sediments, making very rich soils compared to the higher terra firme on either side of the várzea. The river waters, loaded with sediment, rise by 6 to 12 metres (20 to 39 ft) each year, flooding the land for as long as eight months.

The river course through the floodplain constantly shifts over time, creating oxbow lakes, levees, meander swales and bars. These landscape elements support diverse vegetation, predominantly seasonally flooded tropical evergreen rainforest. Typically the levees are relatively high, formed by the deposit of sediments along the river margins. Behind them the land slopes down, flattens out and then rises to the terra firme forest. The area behind the levees holds canarana grassland and lakes that expand and contract with the flood cycle.

== Climate ==
The Köppen climate classification is "Af": equatorial, fully humid. Average monthly temperatures range from 23 to 32 °C (73 to 90 °F) with an annual average of 28 °C (82 °F). Average annual rainfall in the east is less than 2,000 millimetres (79 in), while in some parts of the Madeira in the west it exceeds 2,500 millimetres (98 in).

== Ecology ==
The ecoregion is in the Neotropical realm and the tropical and subtropical moist broadleaf forests biome.

=== Flora ===
The main vegetation types are aquatic vegetation, permanent swamp vegetation, succession vegetation and forest mosaics. Typically there are fewer tree species in the várzea than on terra firme, although many trees are common to both environments. Trees in the várzea are usually shorter than on terra firme, with a canopy of up to 25 metres (82 ft). There are some palms, and often a dense understory of plants in the genus Heliconia and families Zingiberaceae and Marantaceae. Tree species that grow only in wetlands include Virola surinamensis, Calycophyllum spruceanum and Açaí palm (Euterpe oleracea). The economically valuable palms Astrocaryum jauari and Mauritia flexuosa are common on the floodplain. Other trees that feed the fruit-eating fish that enter the forest during flood periods are the yellow mombim (Spondias mombim), socoró (Mouriri ulei) and tarumã (Vitex cymosa).

Grasses in the canarana areas include Echinochloa and Hymenachne species, with tall grasses along the river margin such as Gynerium sagittatum, Paspalum repens and Echinocloa polystachya. Shrubs include Coccoloba ovata, Eugenia inundata, Ruprechtia ternifolia and Symmeria paniculata. Slightly higher up there are early succession trees such as Acosmium nitens, Buchenavia macrophylla, Cecropia latiloba, Crateva benthamii, Ficus anthelminthica, Machaerium leiophyllum, Macrolobium angustifolium, Piranhea trifoliata, Pseudobombax munguba and Tabebuia barbata. Higher up again, but still in flooded areas, trees include Calycophyllum spruceanum, Ceiba pentandra, Couroupita guianensis, Hura crepitans, Pirahnea trifoliata, Virola surinamensis, Genipa americana, Hevea brasiliensis, Lecointea amazonica, Sterculia elata and Rheedia brasiliensis.

=== Fauna ===
The ecoregion is home to 200 species of mammals including jaguar (Panthera onca), ocelot (Leopardus pardalis), South American tapir (Tapirus terrestris), capybara (Hydrochoerus hydrochaeris), kinkajou (Potos flavus) and white-lipped peccary (Tayassu pecari). The hairy-tailed bolo mouse (Necromys lasiurus), and Amazonian sac-winged bat (Saccopteryx gymnura) are endemic. Aquatic mammals include Amazon river dolphin (Inia geoffrensis), tucuxi (Sotalia fluviatilis) and the endangered Amazonian manatee (Trichechus inunguis) is also endangered. The giant otter (Pteronura brasiliensis) is also endangered. Large reptiles include black caiman (Melanosuchus niger), spectacled caiman (Caiman crocodilus) and green anaconda (Eunectes murinus).

Primates include spider monkey (subfamily Atelinae), Venezuelan red howler (Alouatta seniculus), common squirrel monkey (Saimiri sciureus), bare-eared squirrel monkey (Saimiri ustus) and red-handed tamarin (Saguinus midas). Endemic primates include Hoffmanns's titi (Callicebus hoffmannsi), ashy black titi (Callicebus cinerascens), Hershkovitz's titi (Callicebus dubius), Santarem marmoset (Mico humeralifer) and white-footed saki (Pithecia albicans). Endangered primate include white-bellied spider monkey (Ateles belzebuth), Peruvian spider monkey (Ateles chamek), white-cheeked spider monkey (Ateles marginatus), white-nosed saki (Chiropotes albinasus), black bearded saki (Chiropotes satanas) and pied tamarin (Saguinus bicolor).

681 species of birds have been reported, including herons and egrets (genera Egretta and Ardea), whistling ducks (subfamily Dendrocygninae), sharp-tailed ibis (Cercibis oxycerca), ibis (genus Theristicus), and the roseate spoonbill (Platalea ajaja). Endemic birds include ash-throated crake (Mustelirallus albicollis), plain-breasted ground dove (Columbina minuta), red-shouldered macaw (Diopsittaca nobilis), green-rumped parrotlet (Forpus passerinus), scaled ground cuckoo (Neomorphus squamiger), and stygian owl (Asio stygius). Endangered birds include sun parakeet (Aratinga solstitialis), wattled curassow (Crax globulosa), varzea piculet (Picumnus varzeae), and red-necked aracari (Pteroglossus bitorquatus).

=== Status ===
The World Wildlife Fund lists the ecoregion as "Critical/Endangered". The ecoregion is threatened by contamination of the water and fish by gold mining, and heavy sedimentation caused by destruction of the forests. Huge areas of the floodplain forests are cleared and burned by ranchers to create pastures for livestock. Global warming will force tropical species to migrate uphill to find areas with suitable temperature and rainfall. Low, flat, deforested ecoregions such as the Monte Alegre várzea are extremely vulnerable.

== Sources ==
- Feeley, Kenneth J.; Rehm, Evan (2013), Amazon’s vulnerability to climate change heightened by deforestation and man-made dispersal barriers (PDF), Miami, FL: Florida International University
- "Monte Alegre varzea", Global Species, Myers Enterprises II
- Sears, Robin, Northern South America: Northern central Brazil: NT0141, WWF: World Wildlife Fund
- WildFinder, WWF: World Wildlife Fund
