= Mato Grosso tropical dry forests =

Ecoregion in central Brazil

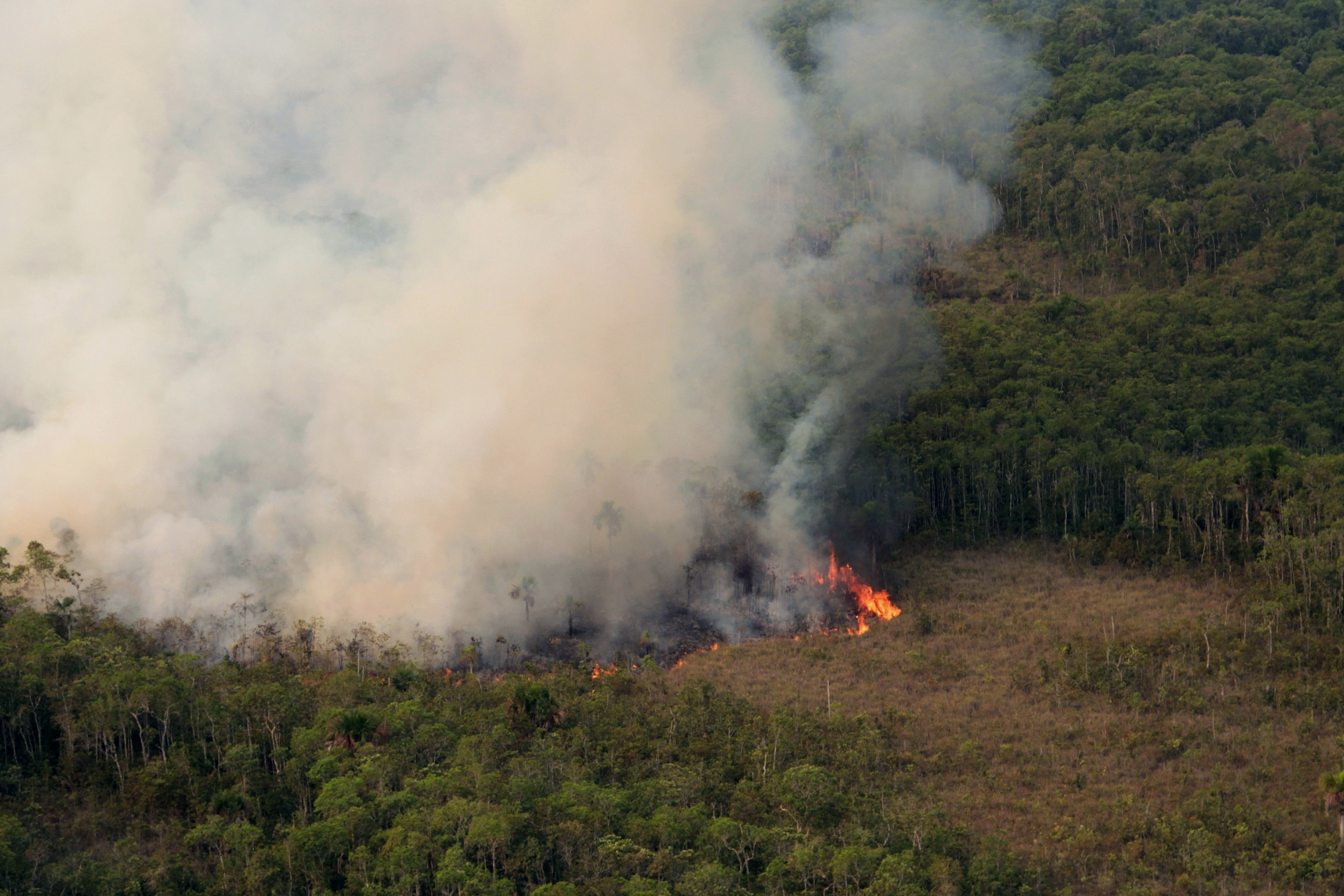
- Fire in the Xingu Indigenous Park (August 2016)

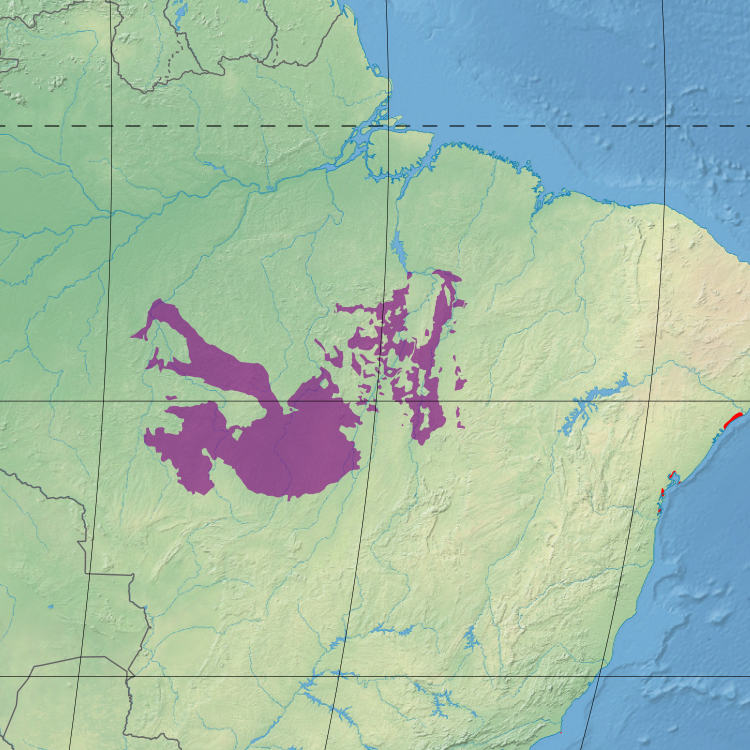
- Ecoregion territory (in purple)

Ecology
- Realm: Neotropical
- Biome: Tropical and subtropical moist broadleaf forests

Geography
- Area: 413,880.10 km^{2} (159,800.00 mi^{2})
- Country: Brazil
- Coordinates: 11.768°S 53.528°W

The Mato Grosso tropical dry forests (NT0140), also called the Mato Grosso seasonal forests, is an ecoregion in central Brazil to the south of the Amazon region. It contains vegetation in the transition between the Amazon rainforest to the north and the cerrado savanna to the south. The opening of highways through the region has caused rapid population growth, deforestation and pollution.

== Location ==
The Mato Grosso tropical dry forests ecoregion covers 41,388,010 hectares (102,272,000 acres). The forests are mainly in the north of the state of Mato Grosso, but extend into the southeast of Amazonas, the south of Pará and parts of Tocantins and Maranhão.

Some sources include the ecoregion in the Amazon biome. In the northwest it adjoins the Madeira–Tapajós moist forests and Tapajós–Xingu moist forests ecoregions, and extends north for some distance between them. In the east patches of the Mato Grosso tropical dry forests are interspersed with the Xingu–Tocantins–Araguaia moist forests and extend as far as the Tocantins–Araguaia–Maranhão moist forests. In the south and east the Mato Grosso tropical dry forests meet the Cerrado ecoregion.

== Physical ==
In the north the slopes are from 8% to 30%, while in the south they are less than 8%. The northeast of the region is in the Serra do Cachimbo and the eastern part is in the Serra dos Caiabis and Serra Formosa. These three ranges are well-drained savannas. The ecoregion contains part of the Alto-Xingu, the headwaters of the Xingu River. The central and western area cover a river drainage basin between the Serra do Roncador and the Serra do Formosa. In the east and center most of the soils are ultisols. In the western serras they are mainly entisols and oxisols.

== Ecology ==
The Mato Grosso tropical dry forests ecoregion is in the Neotropical realm and the tropical and subtropical moist broadleaf forests biome.

=== Climate ===
The Köppen climate classification is "Aw": equatorial, dry winter. There is relatively little temperature variation throughout the year. Average temperatures range from 20 °C (68 °F) to 33 °C (91 °F) with a mean of 26 °C (79 °F).

Rainfall varies considerably from month to month, with little rain in June–July and 348 millimetres (13.7 in) in March. Total annual precipitation is around 2,100 millimetres (83 in). The serras in the east have wet seasons that last for 6–8 months. The central body of the ecoregion in Mato Grosso, and the portions to the west, have wet seasons from 8–9 months. During the rainy season from December to May large areas are flooded. In the dry season the porous soil quickly drains the wetlands and pools, leaving large flats and patches of dry forest, savanna and moist forest.

=== Flora ===
The Mato Grosso tropical dry forests ecoregion is a transitional zone between the moist forests of the Amazon basin to the north and the Cerrado of the Brazilian Highlands to the south. The annual floods and periodic fires in the dry season form a complex mosaic of forest, grasslands and transitional vegetation. The dominant habitat is dry forest, but the ecoregion also contains savannas, gallery forests and areas of dense thicket. Much of the habitat is found in isolated patches within other ecoregions.

The soil of the Serra do Cachimbo is white sand. It has an extensive region of campos rupestres, an open plant formation subject to drought growing on rocks that do not retain water. In appearance the campo ruprestre is similar to savanna, but the flora are different with species such as Calea lutea and others that are found in caatinga forest. The central and western areas hold tropical semi-deciduous seasonal forest. Forests are not as lush as those found further west, and the trees are shorter at 10 to 15 metres (33 to 49 ft). Flora includes Piptadenia incurialis and species of the Bowdichia, Hymenaea, and Machaerium genera. Cerrado species include Curatella americana, Qualea species, and Kielmeyera coriacea.

=== Fauna ===
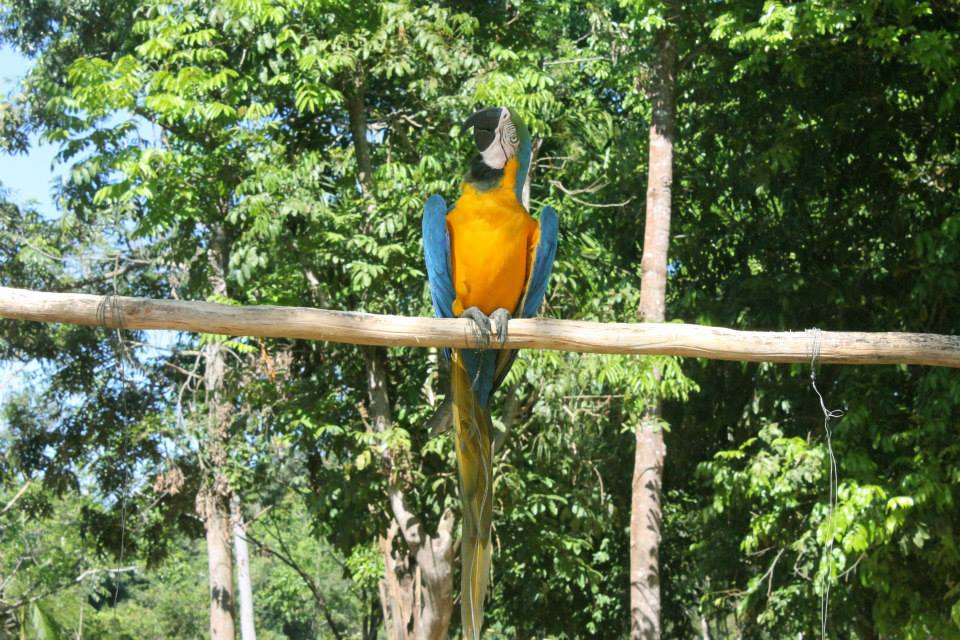
Blue-and-yellow macaw (Ara ararauna) in Xingu State Park

The various seasonal habitats support diverse fauna with many endemic species including cayman lizards and colorful butterflies. In 1967–69 the British Royal Society and Royal Geographical Society undertook an expedition in the Mato Grosso (upper Xingu River). They found 46 genera of rodents including the large capybara (Hydrochoerus hydrochaeris), 52 genera of bats of which Artibeus and Molossus were most common, 3 of marsupials and 11 of edentates. They recorded 161 species of birds of which 60 occurred only in the cerrado, 33 in gallery forests and 25 in dry forest. The Serra do Cachimbo has an isolated population of caatinga antwren (Herpsilochmus sellowi) and the endemic amphibian Tropidurus insulanus.

Endangered mammals include white-cheeked spider monkey (Ateles marginatus), white-nosed saki (Chiropotes albinasus), black bearded saki (Chiropotes satanas) and giant otter (Pteronura brasiliensis). Endangered birds include red-necked aracari (Pteroglossus bitorquatus).

== Status ==
The World Wildlife Fund gives the Mato Grosso tropical dry forests ecoregion the status "Vulnerable". Construction of highways BR-070 / BR-364 from Brasília to Acre and of highway BR-163 from Cuiabá to Santarém, Pará, have caused rapid growth in the human population. The region has experienced a gold rush, which causes mercury pollution, logging and land clearance for cattle ranching and agriculture.

During the period from 2004 to 2011 the ecoregion experienced an annual rate of habitat loss of 0.76%. Global warming will force tropical species to migrate uphill to find areas with suitable temperature and rainfall. Ecoregions such as the Mato Grosso seasonal forests are extremely vulnerable since the deforested strips create barriers to species migration.

The Xingu Indigenous Park provides protection for several indigenous groups.

== Sources ==
- Coca-Castro, Alejandro; Reymondin, Louis; Bellfield, Helen; Hyman, Glenn (January 2013), Land use Status and Trends in Amazonia (PDF), Amazonia Security Agenda Project, archived from the original (PDF) on 2016-03-19
- Feeley, Kenneth J.; Rehm, Evan (2013), Amazon's vulnerability to climate change heightened by deforestation and man-made dispersal barriers (PDF), Miami, FL: Florida International University, archived from the original (PDF) on 2017-04-04
- Locklin, Claudia C., South America: Brazil (NT0140), WWF: World Wildlife Fund
- "Mato Grosso seasonal forests", Global Species, Myers Enterprises II
- WildFinder, WWF: World Wildlife Fund
