= Moju River =

Moju River may refer to

- Moju River (Acará), a river in the east of the state of Pará, Brazil
- Moju dos Campos River, a river in the west of the state of Pará, Brazil
