= Guajará River =

Guajará River may refer to:

- Guajará River (Amazon), a right tributary of the Amazon in the state of Pará, Brazil
- Guajará River (Marajó), a river on the island of Marajó in the state of Pará, Brazil
