= Jaraucu River =

- Location within Brazil
- Native name: Rio Jaraucu (Portuguese)

Location
- Country: Brazil

Physical characteristics
- Source
  - location: Pará state
- Mouth
  - location: Xingu River
  - coordinates: 1.823056°S 52.248889°W

Basin features
- River system: Xingu River

The Jaraucu River is a river of Pará state in north-central Brazil, a tributary of the Xingu River.

The river flows through the Tapajós-Xingu moist forests ecoregion. The river runs through the 1,288,720 hectares (3,184,500 acres) Verde para Sempre Extractive Reserve, a sustainable use conservation unit created in 2004, before discharging into the Xingu.

== See also ==
- List of rivers of Pará
