= Porto de Moz Airport =

Porto de Moz Airport Aeroporto de Porto de Moz
- IATA: PTQ; ICAO: SNMZ; LID: PA0020

Summary
- Airport type: Public
- Serves: Porto de Moz
- Time zone: BRT (UTC−03:00)
- Elevation AMSL: 16 m (52 ft)
- Coordinates: 01°44′29″S 052°14′09″W

Map
- Location in Brazil PTQ (Brazil)

Runways
Direction	Length		Surface
Direction	m	ft	Surface
05/23	1,270	4,167	Asphalt
- Sources: ANAC, DECEA

Porto de Moz Airport (IATA: PTQ, ICAO: SNMZ) is the airport serving Porto de Moz, Brazil.

== Airlines and destinations ==
Airlines	Destinations
Azul Conecta	Belém, Breves

== Access ==
The airport is located 1 km (1 mi) from downtown Porto de Moz.

== See also ==
- List of airports in Brazil
