= Verde para Sempre Extractive Reserve =

Extractive reserve in Pará, Brazil

- Reserva Extrativista Verde para Sempre
- IUCN category VI (protected area with sustainable use of natural resources)
- Location within Brazil
- Nearest city: Porto de Moz, Pará
- Coordinates: 2.266°S 52.749°W
- Area: 1,289,362.78 hectares (3,186,084.8 acres)
- Designation: Extractive reserve
- Created: 8 November 2004
- Administrator: Chico Mendes Institute for Biodiversity Conservation

The Verde para Sempre Extractive Reserve (Portuguese: Reserva Extrativista Verde para Sempre) is an extractive reserve in the state of Pará, Brazil. The reserve supports sustainable use of Amazon rainforest resources by the local population. Both before and after creation of the reserve there have been violent conflicts between different groups seeking access to the resources.

== Location ==
The Verde para Sempre Extractive Reserve has an area of 1,289,362.78 hectares (3,186,084.8 acres). It is in the municipality of Porto de Moz, Pará. The region belongs to the lower Amazon plateau, with altitudes around 200 metres (660 ft). It is bounded by the Amazon River to the north and the Xingu River to the east. The Renascer Extractive Reserve is to the west. It drains into the Amazon and Xingu. The Jaraucu and the Acarai tributaries of the Xingu and the Guajará tributary of the Amazon run through the reserve. Settlements are scattered along the wetlands, streams and tributaries of the Amazon and Xingu.

== Environment ==
The climate is hot and humid, with temperatures ranging from 22 to 40 °C (72 to 104 °F) and averaging 27 °C (81 °F). Average annual rainfall is 3,100 to 5,600 millimetres (120 to 220 in). The region is covered by dense rainforest (68.5%) and pioneer formations (31.5%). The floodplain forest contains stands of forest dominated by palms: babaçu (Attalea genus), palmeira açaí (Euterpe oleracea), and buritirana (Mauritiella armata). Other trees include virola (Virola sebifera), cupiúba and jacarandá (Machaerium genus), andiroba (Carapa guianensis), sucupira (Bowdichia virgiloides), castanha-do-Brasil (Bertholletia excelsa), angelim (Dinizia excelsa), copaíba (Copaifera genus), breu (Protium genus), sapucaia (Lecytis pisonis), pau d'arco (Tabebuia serratifolia) and seringueira (Hevea brasiliensis).

== History ==
Porto de Moz was founded in 1639 but did not become a city until 1890. The area along the Xingu River and its tributaries was inhabited by indigenous groups. Occupation by Europeans began from 1800 until the first decade of the 20th century. Most of the present population arrived in the 1940s, attracted by the second rubber boom. Colonisation was encouraged in 1979 by settlement projects. Creation of the reserve followed serious conflicts between local communities and loggers, escalating after 2002. There is continued conflict between different actors struggling for power and the right to use natural resources. There is intense pressure from logging companies based in other municipalities.

Most families survive through fishing, subsistence agriculture and buffalo husbandry. The residents say the main obstacle to higher earnings is lack of technical knowledge and lack of direct access to the consumer market. A project led by the Brazilian Agricultural Research Corporation between 2007 and 2010 tried to develop sustainable production of buffalo cheese, leather crafts and non-timber products (bio-jewels). The Tropical Forest Institute (IFT: Instituto Floresta Tropical) working with the Sustainable Development Committee of Porto de Moz (CDS), with support from the Vale Fund and others, has developed plans for sustainable forest management in the reserve that have been approved by ICMBio. This will allow low-impact lumber extraction and marketing by the residents.

== Administration ==
The Verde para Sempre Extractive Reserve was created by federal decree on 8 November 2004, and is administered by the Chico Mendes Institute for Biodiversity Conservation (ICMBio). It is classed as IUCN protected area category VI (protected area with sustainable use of natural resources). An extractive reserve is an area used by traditional extractive populations, whose livelihood is based on extraction, subsistence agriculture and small-scale animal husbandry. Its objectives are to protect the livelihoods and culture of these people and to ensure the sustainable use of natural resources. Activities include extraction of wood and non-wood products, family farms, fishing and animal husbandry. On 15 December 2006 the Instituto Nacional de Colonização e Reforma Agrária (INCRA: National Institute for Colonization and Agrarian Reform) recognised the reserve as meeting the needs of 2,500 families. The deliberative council was created on 31 January 2008. The conservation unit is supported by the Amazon Region Protected Areas Program.

== Sources ==
- Alternativas sustentáveis para geração de renda na comunidade da "Reserva Extrativista Verde Para Sempre" (Porto de Moz-PA) (in Portuguese), Embrapa
- Full list: PAs supported by ARPA, ARPA
- Resex Verde para Sempre (in Portuguese), Chico Mendes Institute for Biodiversity Conservation
- Resex Verde Para Sempre, no Pará, tem planos de manejo florestal aprovados (in Portuguese), Fundo Vale, 5 February 2016
- RESEX Verde para Sempre (in Portuguese), ISA: Instituto Socioambiental
- Unidade de Conservação: Reserva Extrativista Verde para Sempre (in Portuguese), MMA: Ministério do Meio Ambiente
