= Curuá Una River =

River in Pará state, Brazil

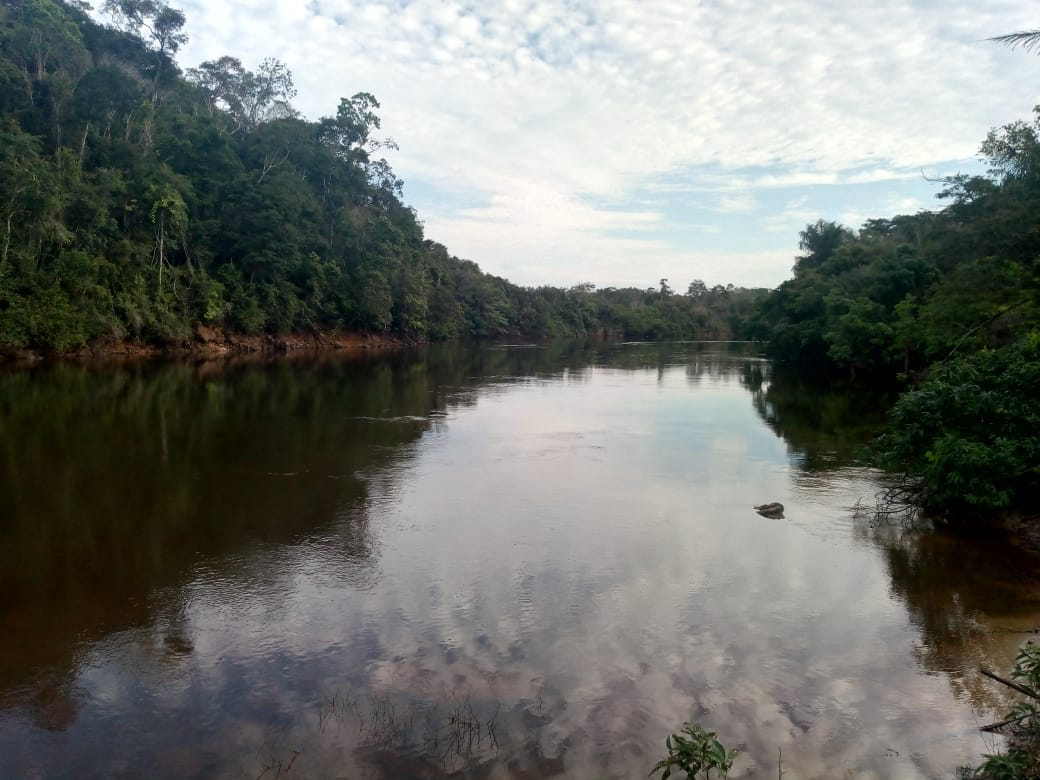

- Location within Brazil
- Native name: Rio Curuá Una (Portuguese)

Location
- Country: Brazil

Physical characteristics
- Source
  - location: Pará state
- Mouth
  - coordinates: 2.376667°S 54.075278°W
- Basin size: 24,505 km^{2} (9,461 mi^{2})
- Discharge
  - average: 680 m^{3}/s (24,000 cu ft/s)

Basin features
- River system: Amazon River

The Curuá Una River is a river of Pará state in north-central Brazil, a right tributary of the Amazon River.

The river flows through the Tapajós-Xingu moist forests ecoregion. Part of the river basin is in the Tapajós National Forest, a 549,067 hectares (1,356,770 acres) sustainable use conservation unit created in 1974. The Moju River, a tributary of the Curuá-Una, rises in the national forest.

== See also ==
- List of rivers of Pará
