= Breves Airport =

Breves Airport Aeroporto de Breves
- IATA: BVS; ICAO: SNVS; LID: PA0015

Summary
- Airport type: Public
- Serves: Breves
- Time zone: BRT (UTC−03:00)
- Elevation AMSL: 30 m (98 ft)
- Coordinates: 01°38′11″S 050°26′36″W

Map
- Location in Brazil BVS (Brazil)

Runways
Direction	Length		Surface
Direction	m	ft	Surface
07/25	1,600	5,249	Asphalt
- Sources: ANAC, DECEA

Breves Airport (IATA: BVS, ICAO: SNVS) is the airport serving Breves, Brazil.

== Airlines and destinations ==
Airlines	Destinations
Azul Conecta	Belém, Porto de Moz

== Access ==
The airport is located 7 km (4 mi) from downtown Breves.

== See also ==
- List of airports in Brazil
