= Moju dos Campos River =

- Location within Brazil
- Native name: Rio Moju dos Campos (Portuguese)

Location
- Country: Brazil

Physical characteristics
- Mouth
  - location: Curuá Una River
  - coordinates: 2.960440°S 54.546372°W

Basin features
- River system: Curuá Una River

The Moju dos Campos River (Portuguese: Rio Moju dos Campos) is a river in the western part of the state of Pará, Brazil.

The Moju River, a tributary of the Curuá Una River, rises in the Tapajós National Forest, a 549,067 hectares (1,356,770 acres) sustainable use conservation unit created in 1974, and flows eastward.

== See also ==
- List of rivers of Pará
