= Porto de Moz =

Coordinates: 1°45′S 52°14′W

- Municipality
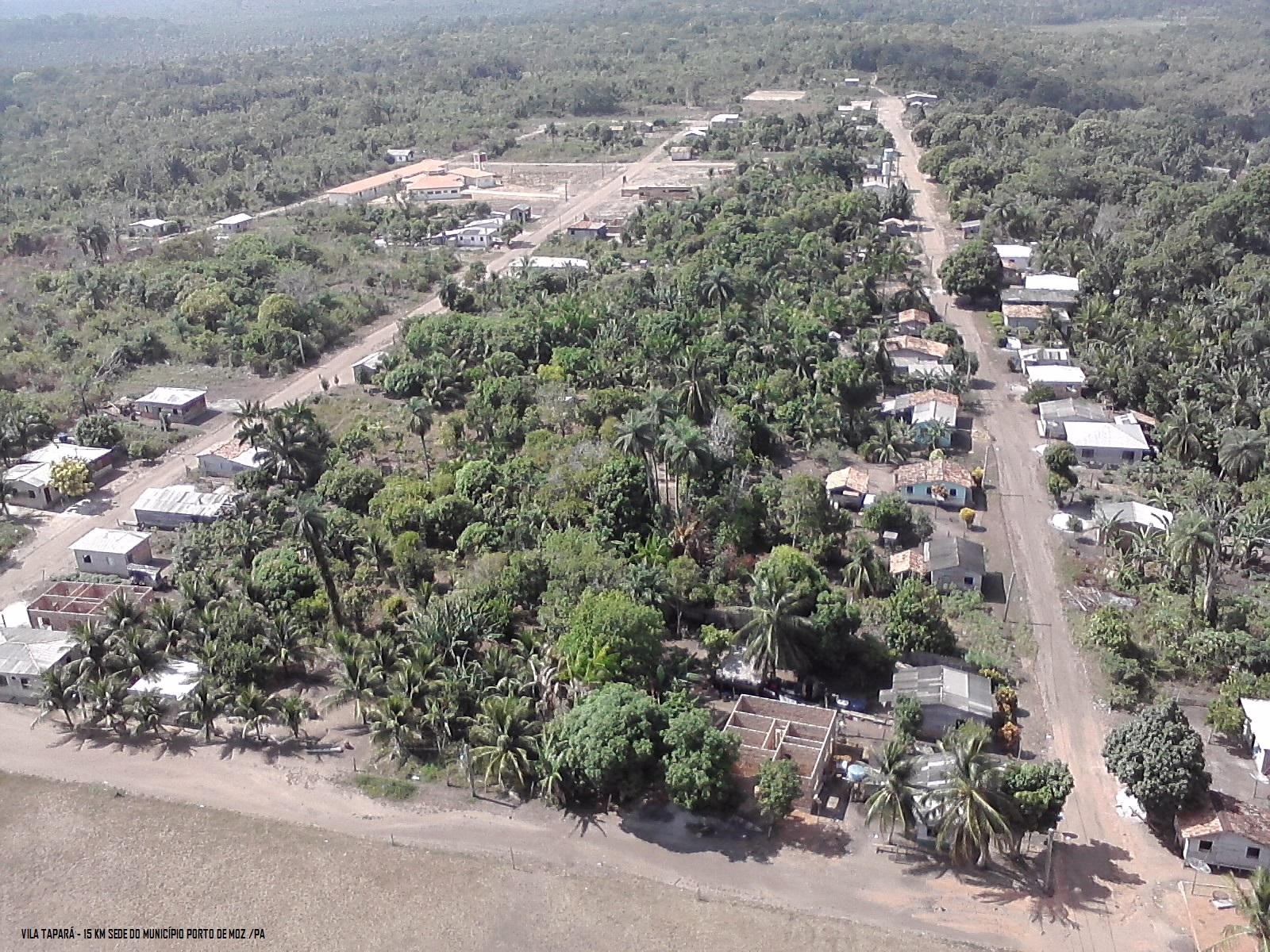

- Location in Pará
- Country: Brazil
- Region: Northern
- State: Pará
- Mesoregion: Baixo Amazonas

Area
  - Total: 6,727.01 sq mi (17,422.88 km^{2})

Population (2020)
  - Total: 41,801
  - Density: 6.2139/sq mi (2.3992/km^{2})
- Time zone: UTC−3 (BRT)

Porto de Moz is a municipality in the state of Pará in the Northern region of Brazil.

The municipality contains the 1,288,720-hectare (3,184,500-acre) Verde para Sempre Extractive Reserve, a sustainable use conservation unit created in 2004.

The city is served by Porto de Moz Airport.

== Climate ==
The climate is tropical monsoon (Köppen: Am), with great differences in precipitation according to the seasons.

Climate data for Porto de Moz (1991–2020)
Month	Jan	Feb	Mar	Apr	May	Jun	Jul	Aug	Sep	Oct	Nov	Dec	Year
Mean daily maximum °C (°F)	31.4 (88.5)	30.9 (87.6)	30.9 (87.6)	31.0 (87.8)	31.4 (88.5)	31.8 (89.2)	32.2 (90.0)	33.2 (91.8)	33.7 (92.7)	33.8 (92.8)	33.5 (92.3)	32.7 (90.9)	32.2 (90.0)
Daily mean °C (°F)	26.7 (80.1)	26.3 (79.3)	26.5 (79.7)	26.6 (79.9)	26.9 (80.4)	27.1 (80.8)	27.1 (80.8)	27.9 (82.2)	28.2 (82.8)	28.4 (83.1)	28.4 (83.1)	27.6 (81.7)	27.3 (81.1)
Mean daily minimum °C (°F)	23.6 (74.5)	23.5 (74.3)	23.8 (74.8)	23.8 (74.8)	23.9 (75.0)	23.8 (74.8)	23.5 (74.3)	24.0 (75.2)	24.1 (75.4)	24.3 (75.7)	24.4 (75.9)	24.1 (75.4)	23.9 (75.0)
Average precipitation mm (inches)	219.4 (8.64)	283.2 (11.15)	333.9 (13.15)	393.0 (15.47)	323.9 (12.75)	243.9 (9.60)	150.6 (5.93)	79.0 (3.11)	54.7 (2.15)	47.0 (1.85)	59.3 (2.33)	115.7 (4.56)	2,303.6 (90.69)
Average precipitation days (≥ 1.0 mm)	17.1	20.8	22.4	23.8	23.1	18.2	14.2	8.9	7.0	5.7	5.4	11.4	178.0
Average relative humidity (%)	84.8	87.1	87.4	87.7	87.3	85.0	84.0	80.9	78.5	77.0	77.7	80.9	83.2
Average dew point °C (°F)	24.4 (75.9)	24.4 (75.9)	24.7 (76.5)	24.9 (76.8)	25.1 (77.2)	25.0 (77.0)	24.8 (76.6)	25.0 (77.0)	25.0 (77.0)	24.9 (76.8)	24.8 (76.6)	24.6 (76.3)	24.8 (76.6)
Mean monthly sunshine hours	140.0	115.0	119.6	132.9	163.9	196.0	230.0	264.3	249.0	235.0	181.2	157.9	2,184.8
Source: NOAA

== See also ==
- List of municipalities in Pará
