= Guajará River (Amazon) =

- Location within Brazil
- Native name: Rio Guajará (Portuguese)

Location
- Country: Brazil

Physical characteristics
- Source
  - location: Pará state
- Mouth
  - location: Amazon River
  - coordinates: 1.773353°S 52.991776°W

Basin features
- River system: Amazon River

The Guajará River (Portuguese: Rio Guajará) is a tributary of the Amazon River in the state of Pará, Brazil.

The river runs through the 1,288,720 hectares (3,184,500 acres) Verde para Sempre Extractive Reserve, a sustainable use conservation unit created in 2004, before discharging into the Amazon.

== See also ==
- List of rivers of Pará
