= Alchornea castaneifolia =

Scientific classification
- Kingdom: Plantae
- Clade: Tracheophytes
- Clade: Angiosperms
- Clade: Eudicots
- Clade: Rosids
- Order: Malpighiales
- Family: Euphorbiaceae
- Genus: Alchornea
- Species: A. castaneifolia

Binomial name
- Alchornea castaneifolia (Bonpl. ex Willd.) A.Juss.

Species of tree

Alchornea castaneifolia (iporuru, iporoni, iporuro, ipururo, ipurosa, macochihua, niando, pajaro; syn. Hermesia castaneifolia Humb. & Bonpl. ex Willd.) is a medicinal plant native to Amazon rainforest vegetation in Brazil.

== Traditional medicine ==
For centuries the indigenous peoples of the Amazon have used the bark and leaves of iporuru (Alchornea castaneifolia) for many different purposes and prepared it in many different ways. The Alchornea castaneifolia plant commonly is used with other plants during shamanistic training and, sometimes is an ingredient in ayahuasca (a hallucinogenic, multi-herb decoction used by South American shamans). Throughout the Amazon the bark or leaves of iporuro are tinctured (generally with the local rum, called aguardiente) as a local remedy for rheumatism, arthritis, colds, and muscle pains. Iporuro (Alchornea castaneifolia) is well known to the indigenous peoples of Peru for relieving the symptoms of osteoarthritis, and in aiding flexibility and range of motion. The Candochi-Shapra and the Shipibo Indian tribes use both the bark and roots of iporuro for rheumatism. To prevent diarrhea, members of the Tikuna tribe take one tablespoon of Alchornea castaneifolia bark decoction before meals. The pain-relieving properties of iporuru appear in topical treatments. Crushed leaves are rubbed on painful joints and are beaten into a paste to apply to painful stingray wounds.

Little research has been done to catalog completely the phytochemicals in iporuru. Initial screening has revealed it to contain steroids, saponins, alkaloids and natural phenols (flavonols, flavones, tannins, xanthonoids).
