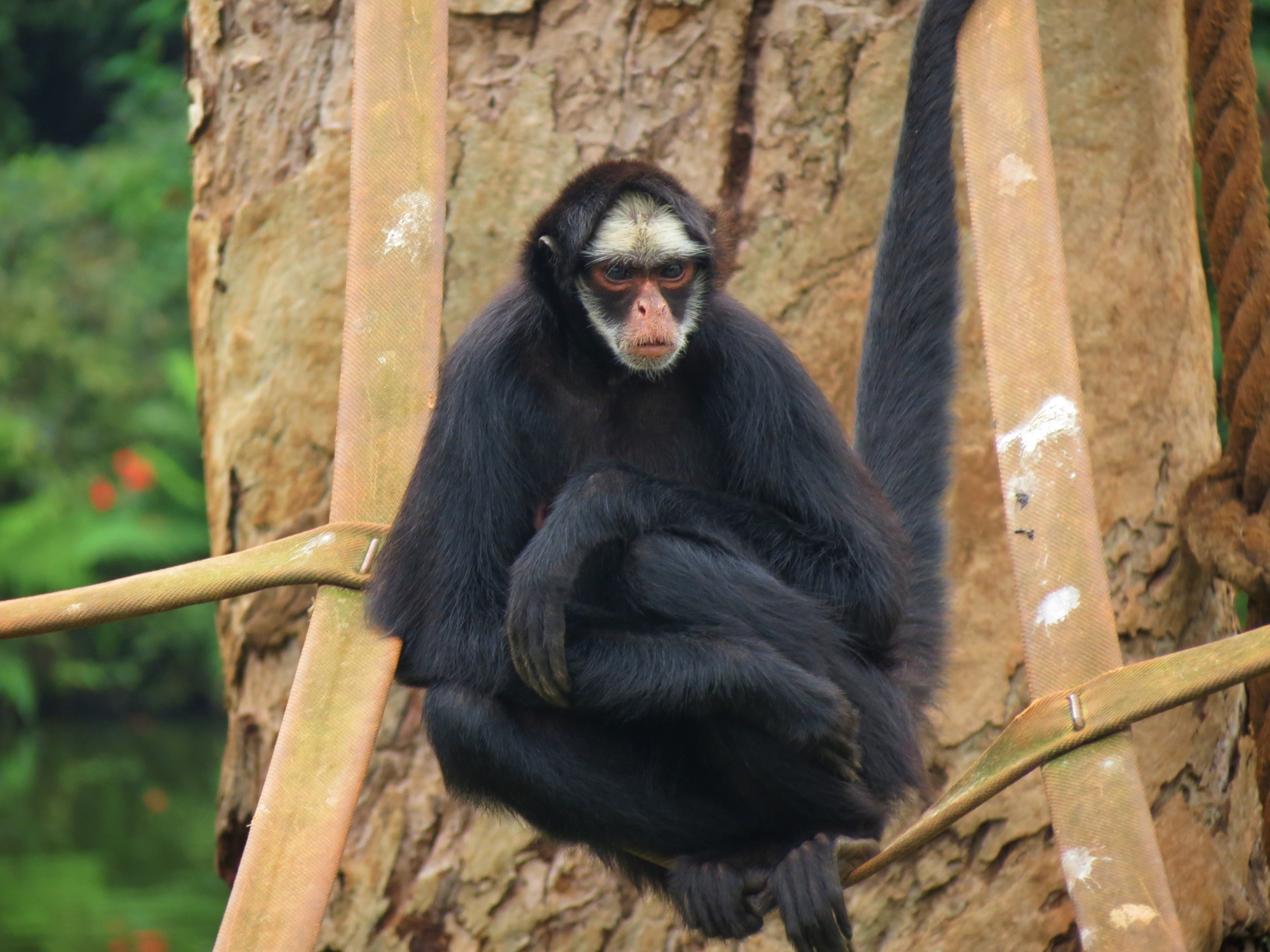

Conservation status
- Endangered (IUCN 3.1)

Scientific classification
- Kingdom: Animalia
- Phylum: Chordata
- Class: Mammalia
- Order: Primates
- Family: Atelidae
- Genus: Ateles
- Species: A. marginatus

Binomial name
- Ateles marginatus É. Geoffroy, 1809
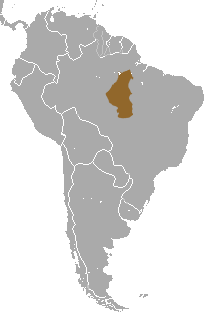
- White-cheeked Spider Monkey range

= White-cheeked spider monkey =

Species of New World monkey

The white-cheeked spider monkey (Ateles marginatus) is a species of spider monkey, a type of New World monkey, endemic to Brazil. It moves around the forest canopy in small family groups of two to four, part of larger groups of a few dozen animals. This monkey feeds on leaves, flowers, fruits, bark, honey and small insects, and it is an important means of seed dispersal for forest trees. Females give birth after a 230-day gestation period. The population of this monkey is decreasing as its forest habitat is lost to soybean production, deforestation and road construction. It is also regarded as a delicacy and hunted for food. For these reasons, the International Union for Conservation of Nature has assessed the animal's conservation status as being "endangered".

== Distribution ==
The white-cheeked spider monkey is commonly found in the Brazilian Amazon. The area in which it is most likely to be found is between the Rio Tapajós (right bank) and its tributary, the Rio Teles Pires/Sao Manuel (right bank) and the Rio Xingu (left bank), south of the Amazonas River. A portion of their territory lies also within national forests such as Tapajós National Forest (545,000 ha (1,350,000 acres)), Xingu National Forest (252,790 ha (624,700 acres)), Altamira National Forest (689,012 ha (1,702,590 acres)), Itaituba I National Forest (220,034 ha (543,720 acres)), and Itaituba II National Forest (440,500 ha (1,088,000 acres)).

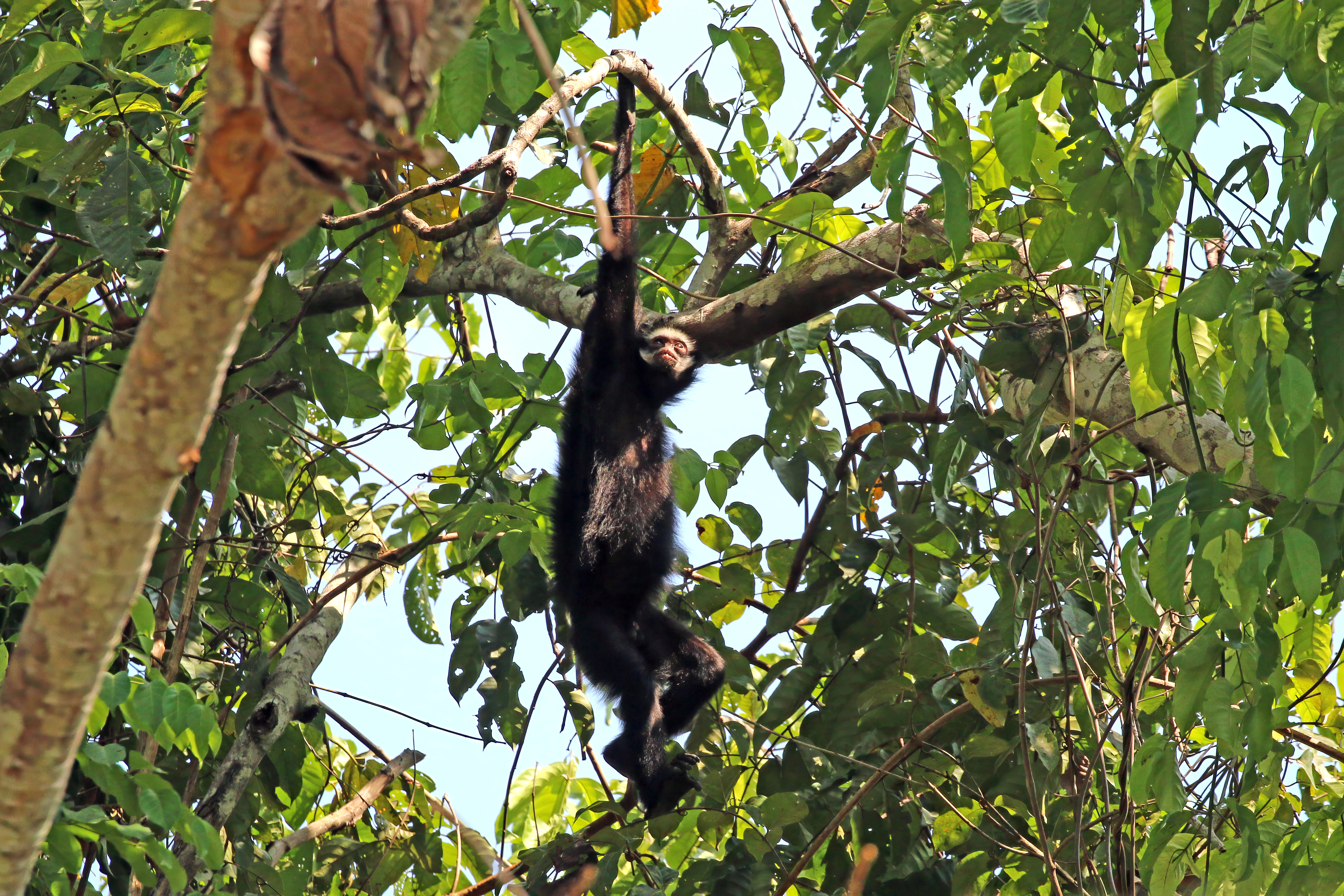
male

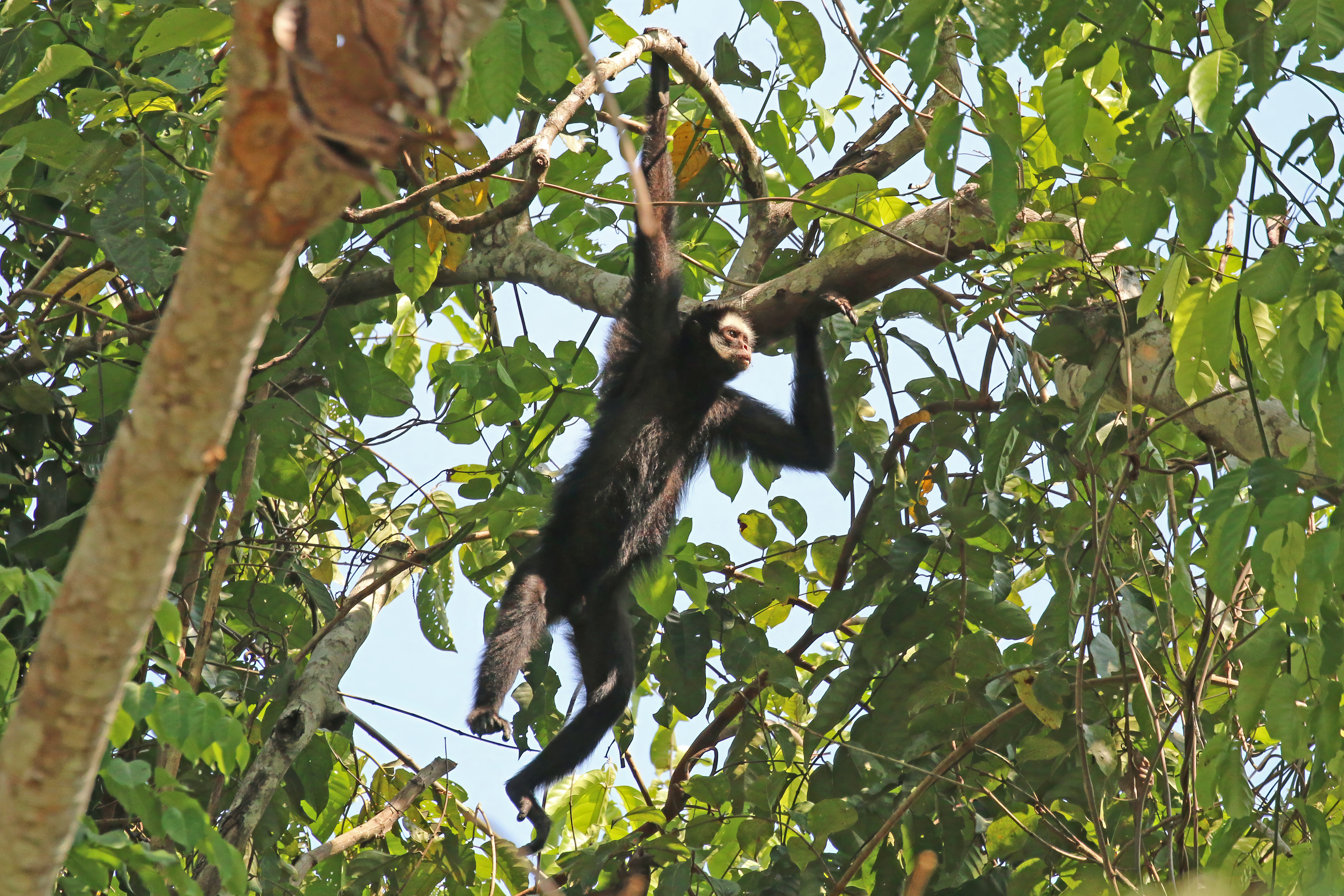
near Cristalino Lodge

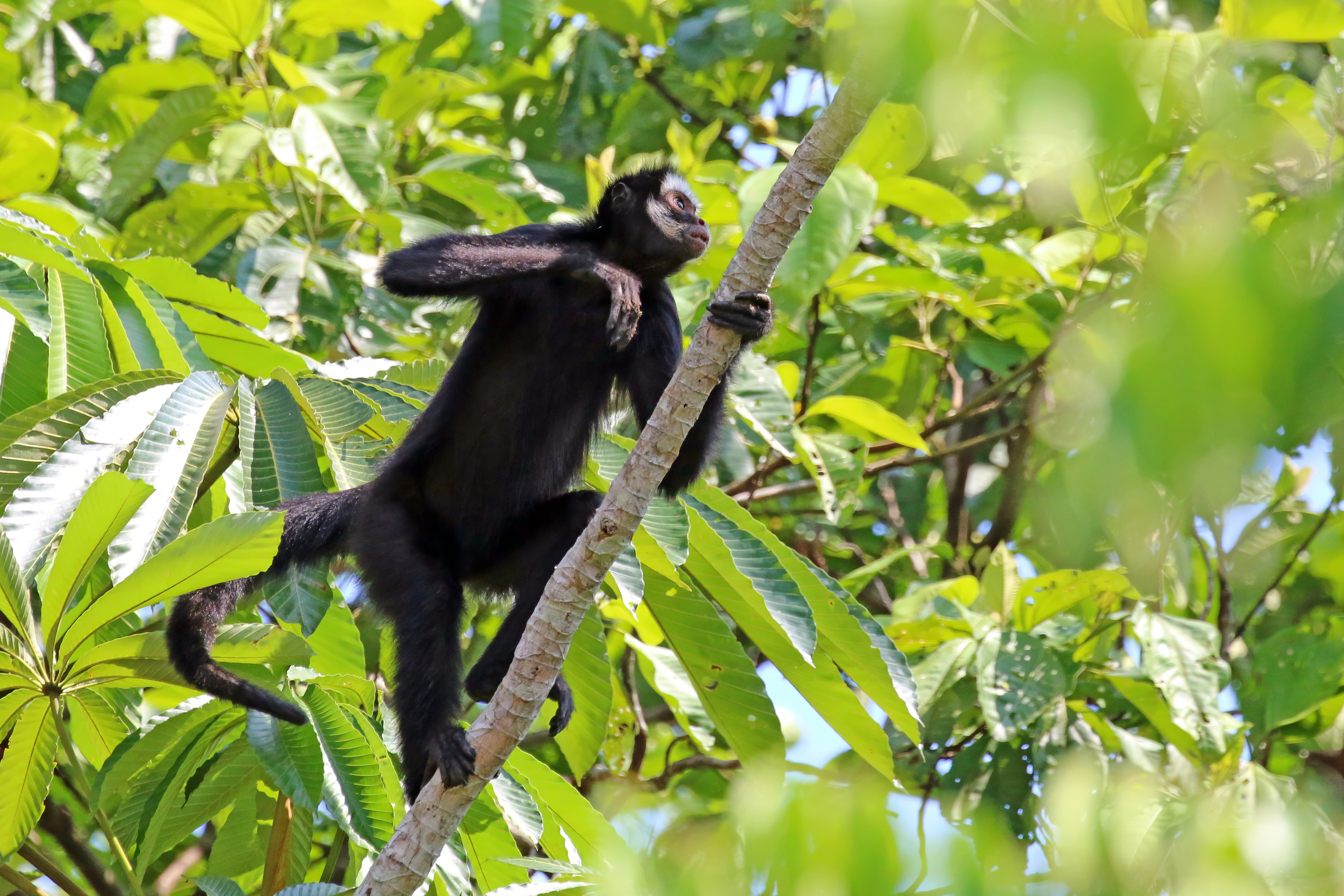
Amazon, Brazil

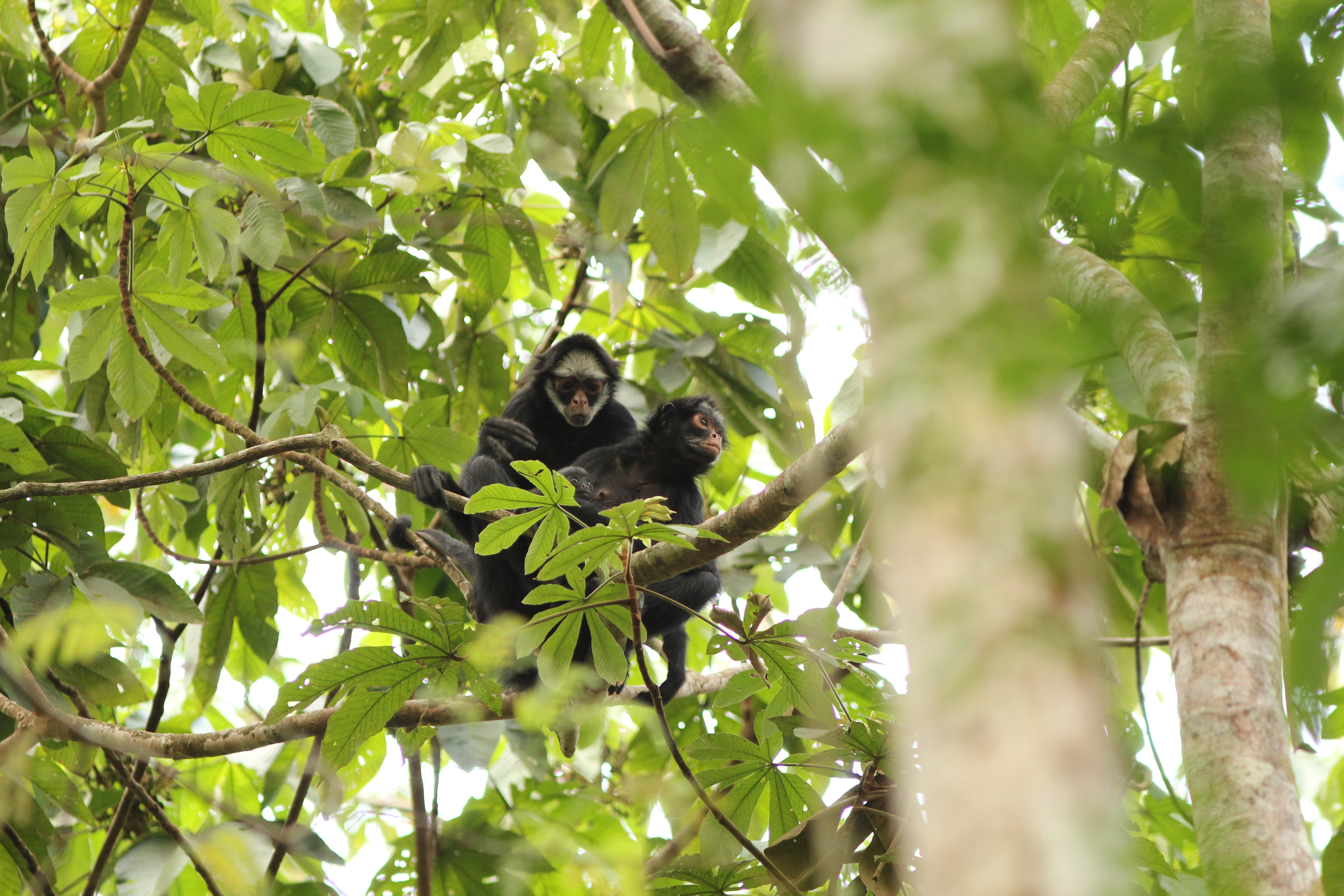
Cristalino Jungle Lodge, Mato Grosso, Brazil

== Ecology ==
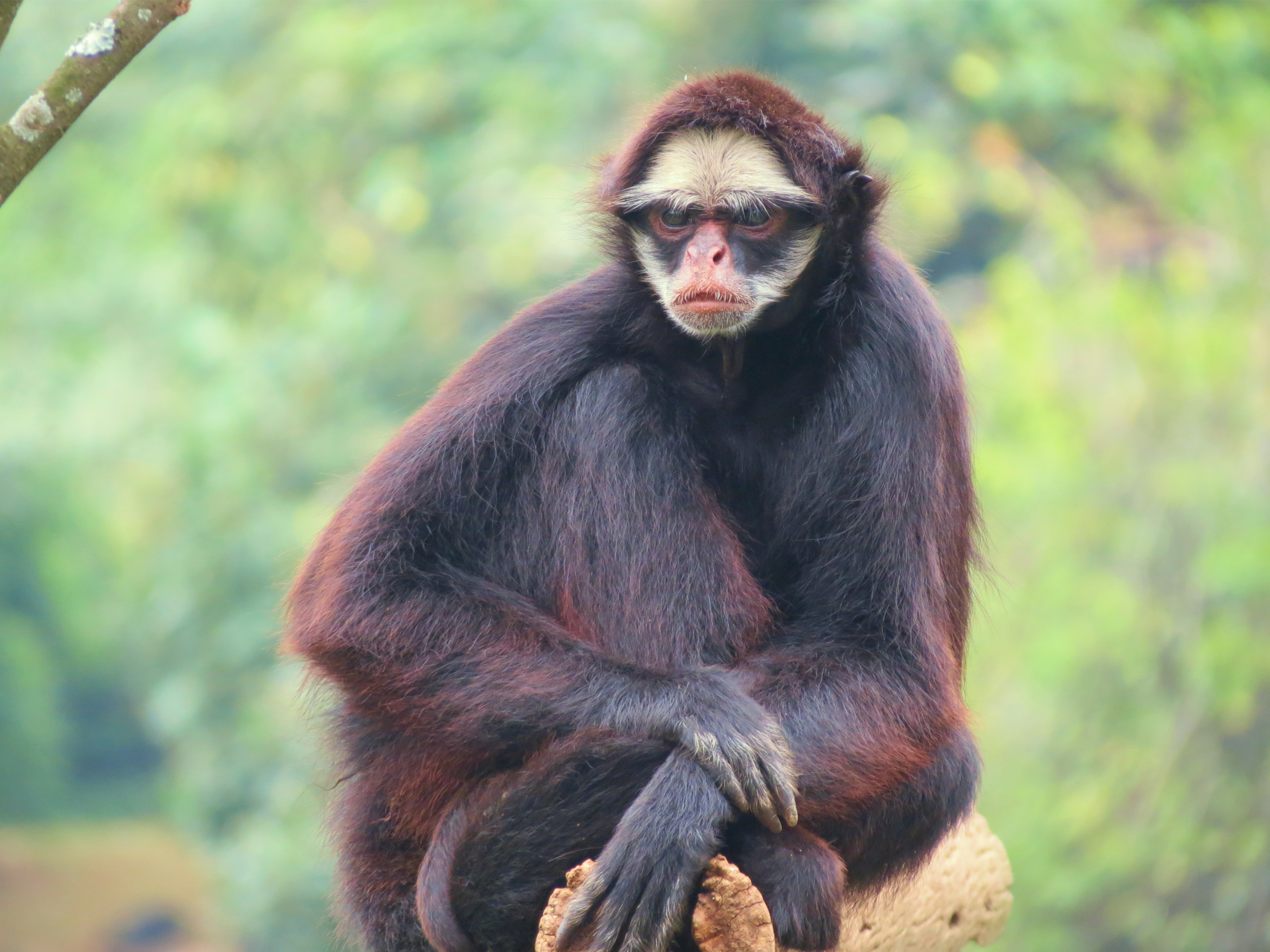
White-Cheeked Spider Monkey in São Paulo Zoo

It is common for the white-cheeked spider monkey to travel in smaller groups of 2-4 when feeding and resting. At around 4–5 years of age, it apparently reaches sexual maturity and will give birth to one offspring after a gestation period of 226–232 days; the interbirth interval can last as long as 28–30 months in the wild.

In São Paulo Zoo

The diet of the white-cheeked spider monkey consists of fruit, leaves, flowers, aerial roots, bark, decaying wood, honey, and even some small insects such as termites and caterpillars. One very important impact it has on its habitat is to provide seed dispersal for different species of plants throughout their territory. It is thought that they provide movement for up to 138 different species of fruit seeds.

== Status ==
There are many different colors of spider monkeys, such as black, brown, and white. Their homes are in the upper levels of the rain forest. The white-cheeked spider monkey was placed on the endangered species list after an assessment in 2008 discovered that their population had decreased by 50% over the course of three generations; this decline can be attributed to habitat loss and hunting. This trend is expected to continue due to the increasing expansion of soybean agriculture. Also, parts of their habitat have been destroyed to make way for major highways and extensive deforestation.

Some of the indigenous peoples in Brazil consider spider monkeys a delicacy, and when this is combined with their low reproduction rate, the population is sure to decline swiftly. It generally lives in groups of 20-30 individuals, but it is rare for them to be seen all together.
