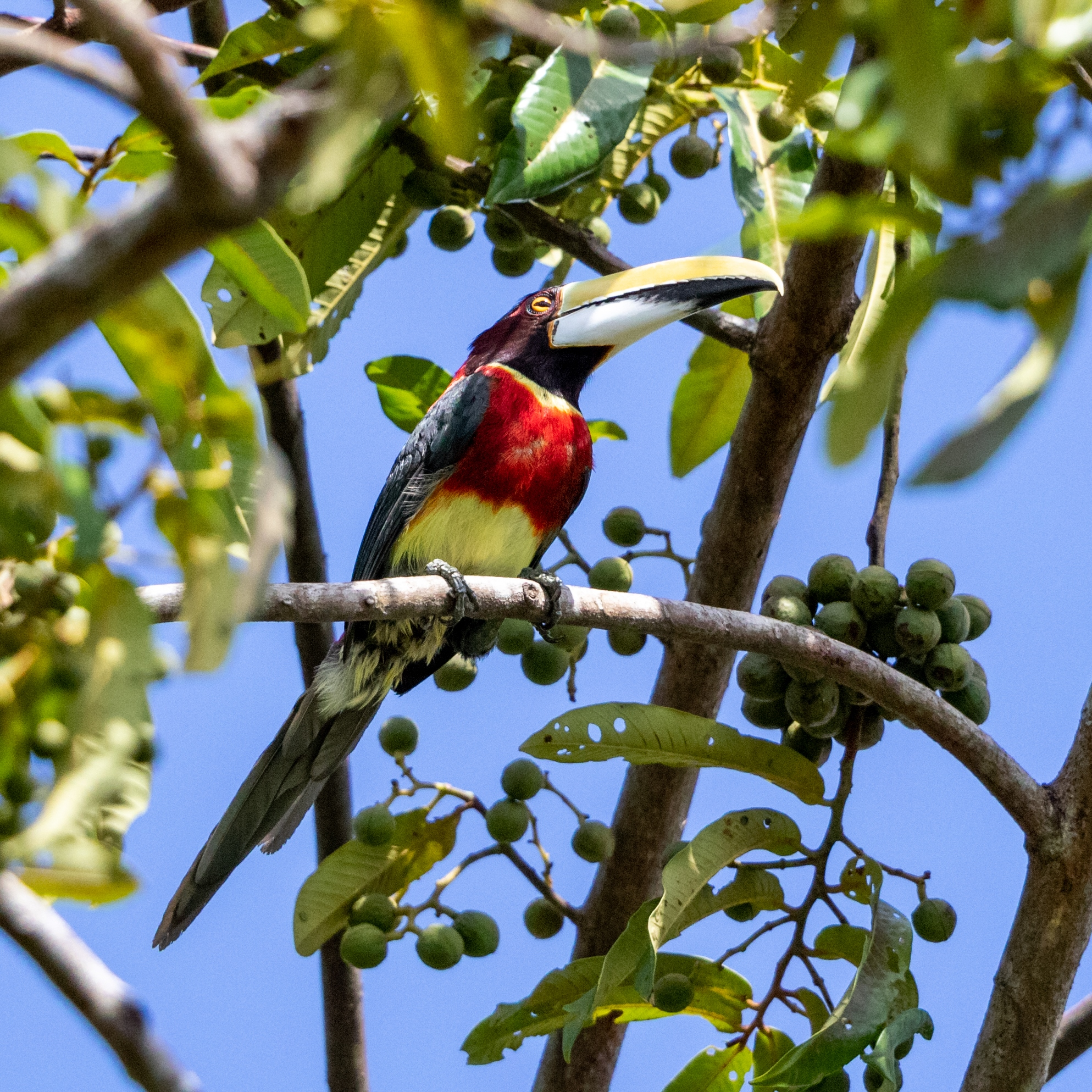
- P. b. bitorquatus in Arari, Brazil
- Least Concern (IUCN 3.1)

Scientific classification
- Kingdom: Animalia
- Phylum: Chordata
- Class: Aves
- Order: Piciformes
- Family: Ramphastidae
- Genus: Pteroglossus
- Species: P. bitorquatus

Binomial name
- Pteroglossus bitorquatus Vigors, 1826

Subspecies
- See text

= Red-necked aracari =

Species of bird

The red-necked aracari or red-necked araçari (Pteroglossus bitorquatus) is a bird in the toucan family Ramphastidae. It is found in Bolivia and Brazil.

== Taxonomy and systematics ==
The International Ornithological Committee (IOC), the Clements taxonomy, and the South American Classification Committee of the American Ornithological Society (SACC) recognize three subspecies of red-necked aracari:

- P. b. sturmii - Natterer, 1843
- P. b. reichenowi - Snethlage, E, 1907
- The nominate P. b. bitorquatus - Vigors, 1826

BirdLife International's Handbook of the Birds of the World treats subspecies P. b. sturmii as a separate species, the "western red-necked araçari", and the other two subspecies as the "eastern red-necked araçari".

This article follows the IOC et al. three-subspecies model.

== Description ==
The red-necked aracari is about 36 to 40 cm (14 to 16 in) long and weighs 112 to 171 g (4.0 to 6.0 oz). The bill of the nominate subspecies has a yellow to greenish white maxilla with black and white along the edge that resembles teeth. The mandible has a white base that angles under the black of the rest of the mandible. Adult males have a blackish crown and dark brown face, chin, and throat. Their eye is surrounded by bare blue to greenish gray skin. Their nape and breast are red; yellow and black bands separate the latter from the throat. The rest of their upperparts are dark green and their underparts are yellow below the breast. Adult females have a browner crown, a lighter face and throat, and a narrower yellow band above the breast than males. Immatures are duller and browner than adults and are orange where adults are red.

Subspecies P. b. reichenowi is similar to the nominate but has no yellow band above the breast and less extensive red on the breast. Its bill has a jagged appearance near the base of the mandible where the black and white meet. P. b. sturmii is larger than the nominate and has a wider yellow band above the red breast. The "teeth" on the maxilla are less apparent and the mandible is all black except for an orange-yellow band at its base and a pale tip.

== Distribution and habitat ==
The subspecies of red-necked aracari are found thus:

- P. b. sturmii, north-central Brazil south of the Amazon River between the Rio Madeira and Rio Tapajós, south from there to Rondônia state and eastern Bolivia, and east to near the Rio Xingu
- P. b. reichenowi, Brazil south of the Amazon between the Rio Tapajós and Rio Tocantins and south from there to northern Mato Grosso
- P. b. bitorquatus, northeastern Brazil south of the Amazon from the Rio Tocantins east to the Atlantic coast in Maranhão state.

The red-necked aracari inhabits a variety of forest types from the lowlands to hilly terrain, primarily moist tropical terra firme forest but also gallery forest in cerrado, dense bamboo, and mature secondary forest. In elevation it ranges from sea level to about 800 m (2,600 ft).

== Behavior ==
=== Movement ===
The red-necked aracari is probably sedentary, with limited local movements.

=== Feeding ===
The red-necked aracari forages from the forest mid level to the canopy, alone, in pairs, or in a small group. Its diet not well known but is primarily fruit and also probably includes insects, eggs, and small vertebrates.

=== Breeding ===
The red-necked aracari's breeding season in much of its range spans from February to August but in some areas is April to September and in Bolivia is from July to December. It is assumed to nest in tree cavities like other toucans. Nothing else is known about its breeding biology.

=== Vocalization ===
The red-necked aracari has a wide variety of vocalizations, variously repeated "tik or tek notes", repeated "ttak or tyat", and "single ik notes, a tweah, and growl-like, chattery dcheeeaah calls."

== Status ==
The IUCN follows HBW taxonomy and so has assessed the "western" and "eastern" red-necked aracaris separately. The "western" P. b. sturmii was originally rated as Near Threatened but in late 2021 was downlisted to Least Concern. It has a large range, but its population size is not known and is believed to be decreasing. The "eastern" P. b. reichenowi + P. b. bitorquatus was previously assessed as Endangered, but has been downlisted to Near Threatened as of 2023. It too has a large range, but its population size also is not known and is believed to be decreasing. Continued deforestation in the Amazon basin is the principal threat to both populations.

== Gallery ==
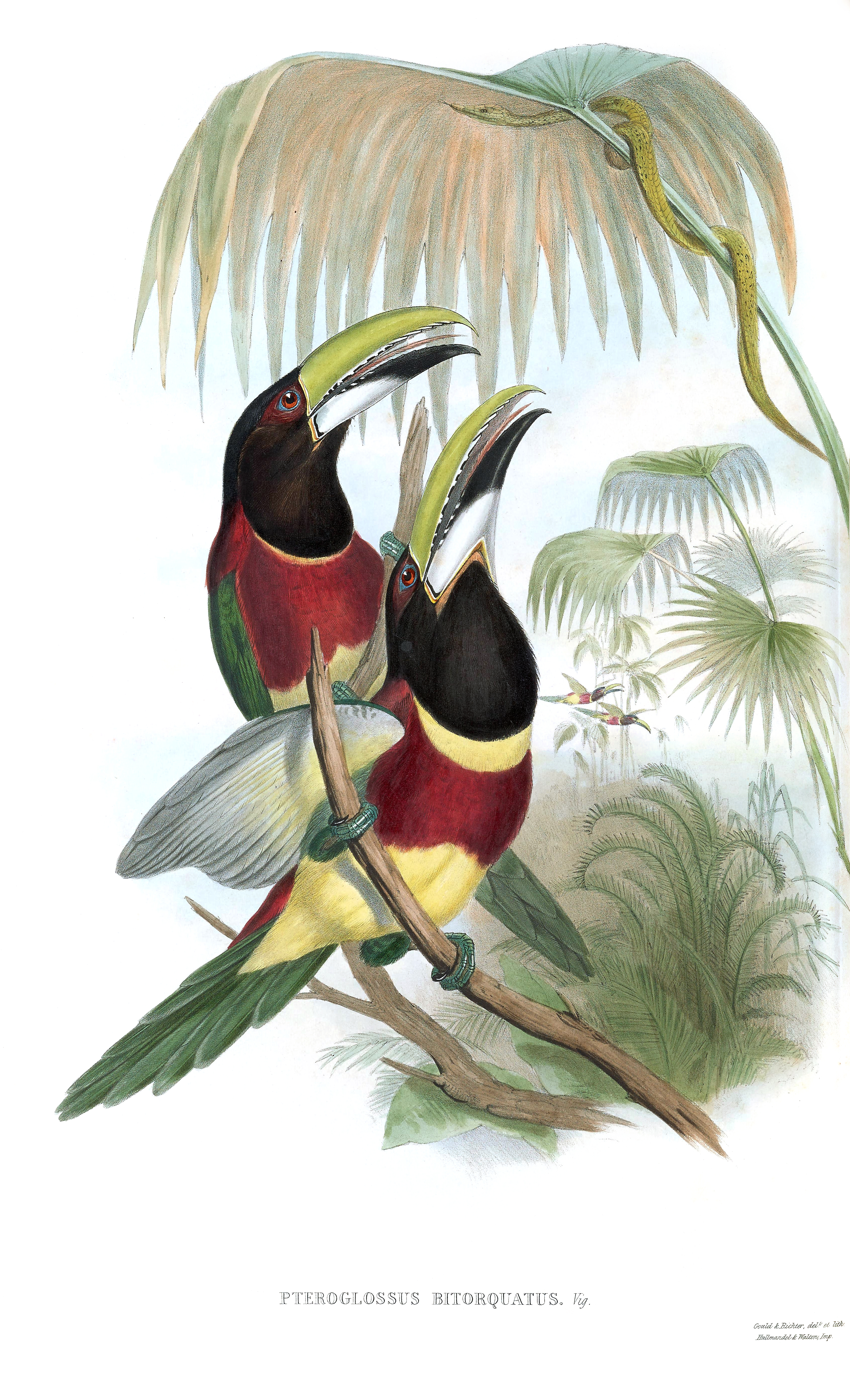
Illustration of P. b. bitorquatus by Gould and Richter in 1854

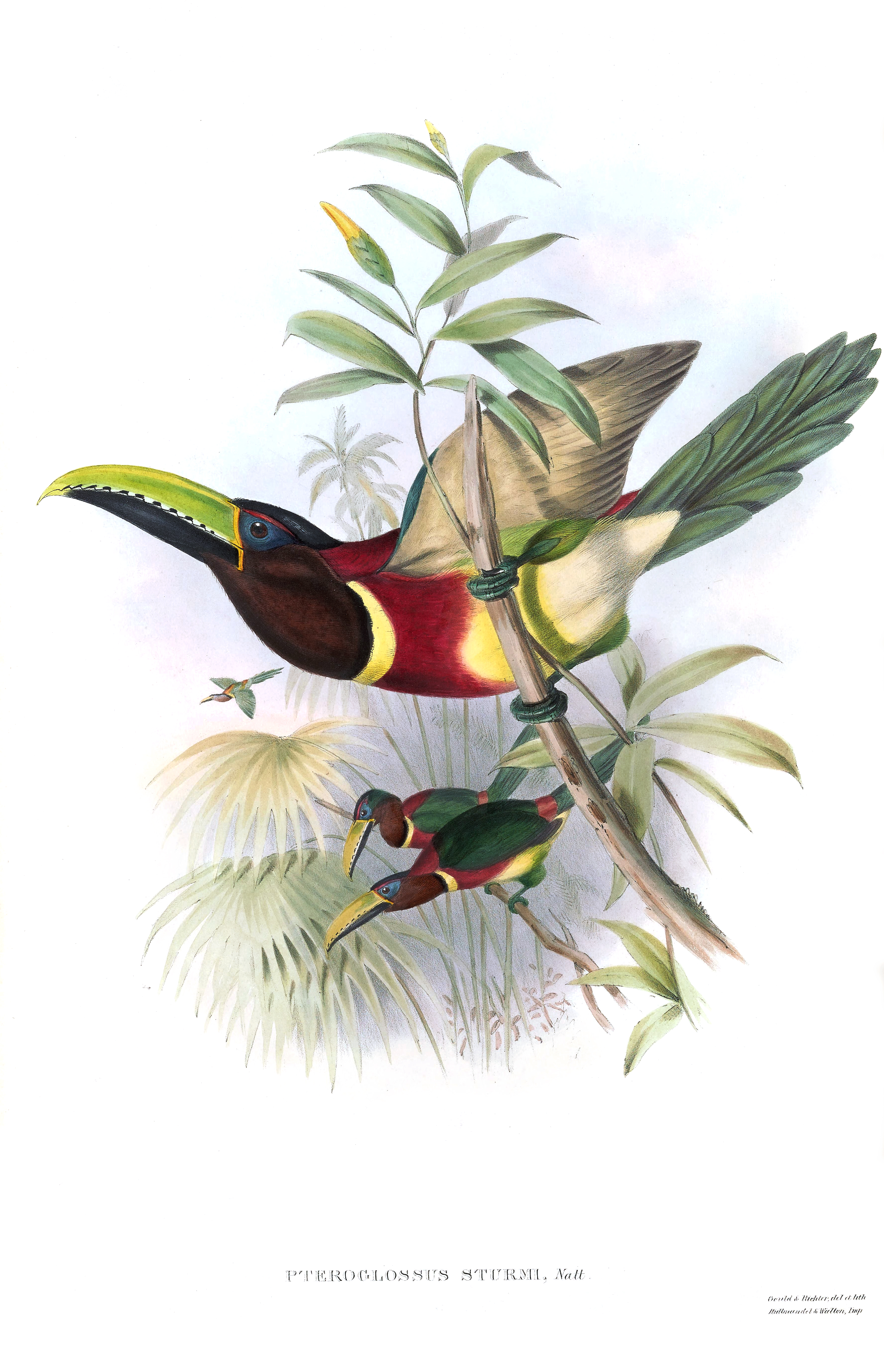
Illustration of P. b. sturmii by the same authors
