= Jatobá Hydroelectric Power Plant =

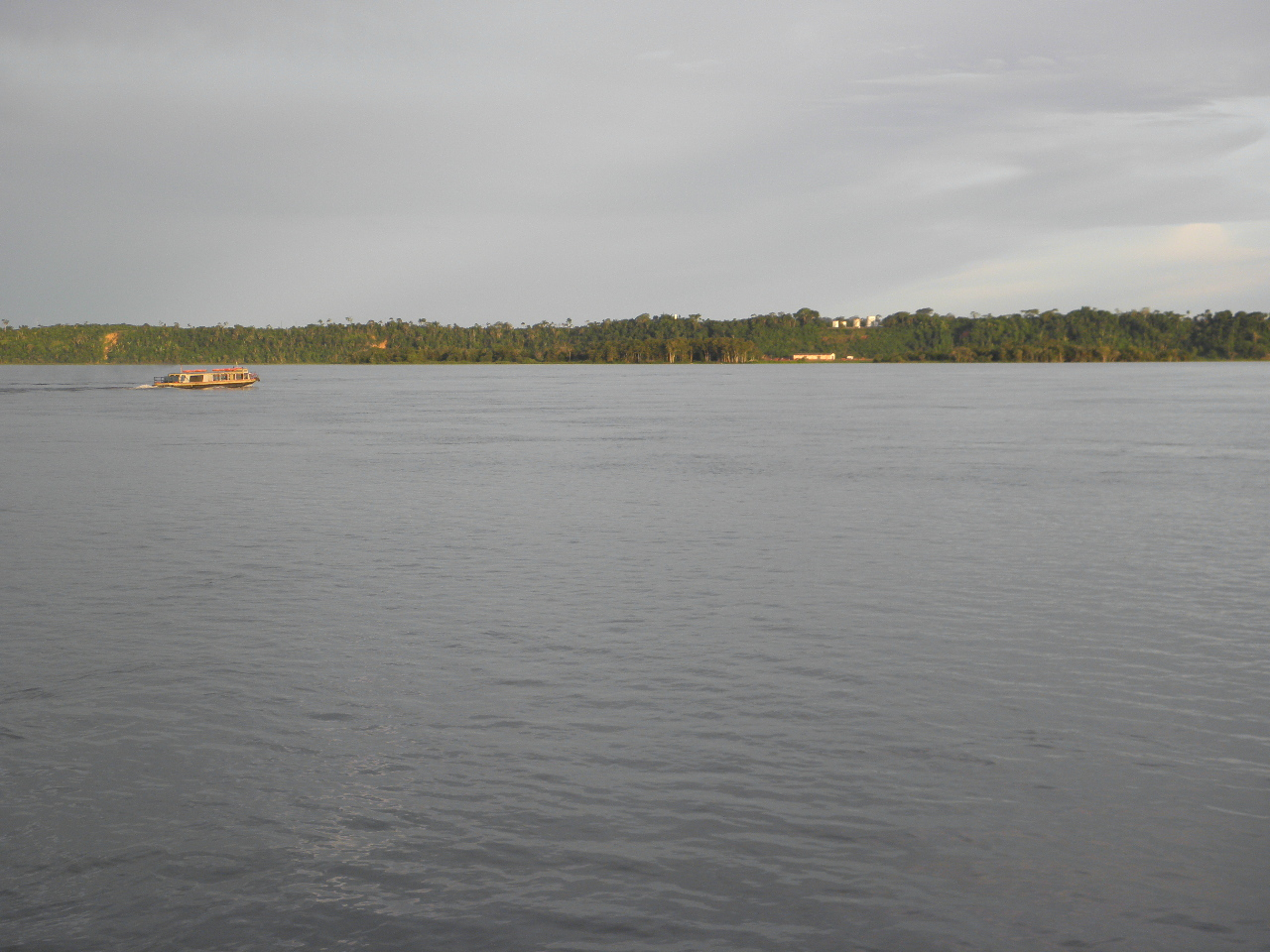
- Tapajós river in Itaituba

- Location within Brazil
- Official name: Usina Hidrelétrica Jatobá
- Country: Brazil
- Location: Itaituba, Pará
- Coordinates: 5.189099°S 56.914293°W
- Purpose: Hydroelectric
- Status: Suspended
- Operator: Grupo de Estudo Tapajós

Dam and spillways
- Impounds: Tapajós river
- Height (thalweg): 35.3 metres (116 ft)
- Length: 1,287 metres (4,222 ft)

Reservoir
- Surface area: 646 square kilometres (249 sq mi)
- Normal elevation: 66 metres (217 ft)

Power Station
- Hydraulic head: 16 metres (52 ft)
- Turbines: 40 bulb turbines, each 59.7 MW (80,100 hp)
- Installed capacity: 2,338 MW (3,135,000 hp)
- Annual generation: 11,264 GW (1.5105×10^{10} hp)

The Jatobá Hydroelectric Power Plant (Portuguese: Usina Hidrelétrica Jatobá) is a planned hydroelectric power plant and dam on the Tapajós river in the state of Pará, Brazil. As of 2017 the project was suspended.

== Location ==
The Jatobá Hydroelectric Power Plant will be built on the Tapajós river in the state of Pará, the second largest hydroelectric plant in the state. The reservoir will cover 64,600 hectares (160,000 acres). The plant and reservoir will affect the municipalities of Itaituba and Jacareacanga. The dam will be just upstream from the Sawré Muybu Indigenous Territory. It would flood large areas of Munduruku territory, and of land used by traditional ribeirinhos communities. The official estimate is that 1,303 people will be affected by the reservoir.

The plant will be part of the proposed 12,000 megawatts (16,000,000 hp) Tapajós hydroelectric complex on the Tapajos and Jamanxim rivers. Others are the São Luiz do Tapajós (6,133 MW), Cachoeira dos Patos (528 MW), Jamanxim (881 MW) and Cachoeira do Cai (802 MW) dams, all under study, as well as the less advanced proposals for the Chacorão (3,336 MW) and Jardim do Ouro (227 MW). The São Luiz do Tapajós, Jatobá and Chacorão dams on the Tapajós would together flood 198,400 hectares (490,000 acres), including parts of the Amazônia and Juruena national parks and the Itaituba I and Itaituba II national forests.

== Technical ==
The dam will be 1,287 metres (4,222 ft) long, with a maximum height of 35.3 metres (116 ft). The reservoir will have an area of 64,630 hectares (159,700 acres). Excluding the existing river area, 20,400 hectares (50,000 acres) will be newly flooded land. Water levels will be 66 metres (217 ft) upstream and 50 metres (160 ft) downstream. The hydraulic head will be 16 metres (52 ft).

The plant will have installed capacity of 2,338 MW (3,135,000 hp). The plant will have 40 bulb turbines, each with capacity of 59.7 MW (80,100 hp). Assured energy will be 1,282 megawatts (1,719,000 hp). Annual output will be 11,264 GW (1.5105×10^{10} hp). The cost is estimated at US$4.4 billion.

== Planning process ==
Provisional measure 558 of 5 January 2012, which changed the boundaries of various conservation units in the Amazon region, removed an area of about 19,915 hectares (49,210 acres) from the Tapajós Environmental Protection Area due to the planned Jatobá Hydroelectric Power Plant. The measure reduced the size of other conservation units including the Amazônia National Park, and the Itaituba I, Itaituba II and Crepori national forests. The Federal Prosecutor General (Procurador Geral da União) filed a lawsuit in February 2012 challenging the constitutionality of the measure. Law 12.678 of 25 June 2012 confirmed provisional measure 558.

A "platform" approach is proposed for construction to minimise environmental impact. There would be no access roads, and workers would be taken to the site by helicopter. After construction is complete the site would be regenerated. The dam and plant will be built by the Grupo de Estudo Tapajós consortium, composed of Eletrobras, Eletronorte, Électricité de France, Camargo Corrêa, CEMIG, Copel, Engie, Enersis and Neoenergia. As of 2017 construction was suspended.

== Sources ==
- APA do Tapajós (in Portuguese), ISA: Instituto Socioambiental
- "Brazil sets concession auction for 8,040-MW Sao Luiz do Tapajos hydro project", Hydro World, Brasilia: PennWell Corporation, 17 September 2014
- Damning the Amazon: the risky business of hydropower in the Amazon (PDF), Greenpeace, 2016
- Hydroelectric Dams in Pará and Two Serious Legal Offenses: Omission and Leniency, International Rivers, 11 December 2013
- "Jatobá Perfil da usina", Barragens na Amazônia (in Portuguese), archived from the original on 2017-12-31
- Jatobá hydro plant, BNAmericas: Business News Americas
- "Tapajós Basin Dams", International Rivers
- Usinas do Tapajós (in Portuguese), Grupo de Estudo Tapajós, archived from the original on 2017-01-19
