= Jardim do Ouro Dam =

- Location within Brazil
- Official name: Barragem Jardim do Ouro Dam
- Country: Brazil
- Location: Itaituba, Pará
- Coordinates: 6.276763°S 55.761959°W
- Purpose: Hydroelectric
- Status: Planned

Dam and spillways
- Impounds: Jamanxim River

Reservoir
- Surface area: 42,600 hectares (105,000 acres)

Power Station
- Installed capacity: 227 megawatts (304,000 hp)

The Jardim do Ouro Dam (Portuguese: Barragem Jardim do Ouro Dam) is a proposed hydroelectric dam on the Jamanxim River in the state of Pará, Brazil. The dam would have a 42,600 hectares (105,000 acres) reservoir and capacity of 227 megawatts (304,000 hp). It has not been studied on detail due to relatively low return on investment compared to other projects in the region.

== Location ==
Sketch map showing locations of dams

The Jardim do Ouro Dam is proposed to be built on the Jamanxim River in the state of Pará, in the Tapajós river basin. It would be built in the municipality of Itaituba.

The hydroelectric power plant will be part of the proposed 12,000 megawatts (16,000,000 hp) Tapajos hydroelectric complex on the Tapajós and Jamanxim rivers. Others are the São Luiz do Tapajós (6,133 MW), Jatobá (2,338 MW), Cachoeira do Cai (802 MW), Cachoeira dos Patos (528 MW) and Jamanxim (881 MW), all under study, as well as the Chacorão (3,336 MW).

== Technical ==
The Jardim do Ouro reservoir would have an area of 42,600 hectares (105,000 acres). The plant would deliver 227 megawatts (304,000 hp). A "platform" approach is proposed for construction to minimise environmental impact. There would be no access roads, and workers would be taken to the site by helicopter. After construction is complete the site would be regenerated. Detailed feasibility studies were delayed since the dam, in the upper part of the river, would have higher costs than other projects in the region.

== Sources ==
- "Brazil sets concession auction for 8,040-MW Sao Luiz do Tapajos hydro project", Hydro World, Brasilia: PennWell Corporation, 17 September 2014
- Couto, Fábio (7 May 2010), Usinas-plataforma: aposta no baixo impacto (in Portuguese), Eletronorte, archived from the original on 2017-02-14
- "Jatobá Perfil da usina", Barragens na Amazônia (in Portuguese), archived from the original on 2017-12-31
- "Jardim de Ouro Perfil da usina", Barragens na Amazonia (in Portuguese), archived from the original on April 8, 2012
- "Tapajós Basin Dams", International Rivers
