= Cachoeira dos Patos Dam =

Proposed hydroelectric dam in Pará, Brazil

- Location within Brazil
- Official name: Barragem de Cachoeira dos Patos
- Country: Brazil
- Location: Itaituba, Pará
- Coordinates: 5.902442°S 55.732596°W
- Purpose: Hydroelectric
- Status: Planned

Dam and spillways
- Impounds: Jamanxim River

Reservoir
- Surface area: 11,700 hectares (29,000 acres)

Power Station
- Installed capacity: 528 megawatts (708,000 hp)

The Cachoeira dos Patos Dam (Portuguese: Barragem de Cachoeira dos Patos) is a proposed hydroelectric dam on the Jamanxim River in the state of Pará, Brazil. Work has been delayed due to concern about environmental impact and lack of consultation with affected indigenous people.

== Location ==
Sketch map showing locations of dams

The Cachoeira dos Patos Dam is proposed to be built on the Jamanxim River in the state of Pará, in the Tapajós river basin. It would be built in the municipality of Itaituba. The hydroelectric power plant will be part of the proposed 12,000 megawatts (16,000,000 hp) Tapajós hydroelectric complex on the Tapajós and Jamanxim rivers. Others are the São Luiz do Tapajós (6,133 MW), Jatobá (2,338 MW), Cachoeira do Cai (802 MW) and Jamanxim (881 MW), all under study, as well as the Jardim do Ouro (227 MW) and Chacorão (3,336 MW).

== Technical ==
The Cachoeira dos Patos reservoir would have an area of 11,700 hectares (29,000 acres). The hydroelectric plant would have capacity of 528 megawatts (708,000 hp). Estimated construction cost is US$829 million.

The project would be undertaken by a consortium of Eletrobras, Eletronorte, Construções e Comércio Camargo Côrrea, EDF Consultoria em Projetos de Geração de Energia, Endesa Brasil, EPP Energia Elétrica, Promoção e Participações, Intertechne Consultores Associados and Neoenergia Investimentos. A "platform" approach is proposed for construction to minimise environmental impact. There would be no access roads, and workers would be taken to the site by helicopter. After construction is complete the site would be regenerated.

== Impact ==
The Cachoeira dos Patos reservoir would flood 9,000 hectares (22,000 acres) of the Jamanxim National Park and 360 hectares (890 acres) of the Jamanxim National Forest. It would also affect the area around the Tapajós Environmental Protection Area and the South Amazon Ecotones Ecological Corridor. A study released in December 2015 took into account carbon and methane emissions from the reservoir and from construction and concluded that there was a high probability that the plant would generate emissions comparable to a natural gas plant.

== Licensing ==
Eletronorte, Camargo Corrêa and CNEC Engenharia undertook hydraulic inventory studies of the Tapajós and Jamanxim Rivers, which were approved by the National Electric Energy Agency (Aneel) in 2009. That year Aneel approved the start feasibility studies of the Cachoeira dos Patos, to be delivered on 31 July 2011. The deadline was later extended to 31 December 2013. On 29 July 2013 the Federal Public Ministry recommended suspension of licensing of the Cachoeira dos Patos hydroelectric plant for the same reasons as other planned hydroelectric plants on the Tapajós, Teles Pires, Jamanxim and Juruena rivers. They had not undertaken an Integrated Environmental Assessment and had not consulted with the affected indigenous peoples, both legal requirements. The Ministry of the Environment informed the Federal Public Ministry in Santarém on 20 September 2013 that it had suspended licensing.

== Sources ==
- "Brazil sets concession auction for 8,040-MW Sao Luiz do Tapajos hydro project", Hydro World, Brasilia: PennWell Corporation, 17 September 2014
- "Cachoeira dos Patos Perfil da usina", Barragens na Amazonia (in Portuguese), archived from the original on 2017-12-31
- Fellet, João (12 January 2016), "Estudo alerta para emissões de novas hidrelétricas na Amazônia", BBC Brasil, Washington
- "Governo paralisa licenciamento da usina Cachoeira dos Patos, no Pará", G1 Globo (in Portuguese), 24 September 2013
- "Jatobá Perfil da usina", Barragens na Amazônia (in Portuguese), archived from the original on 2017-12-31
- Sanson, Cesar (31 July 2013), Licenciamento de outra hidrelétrica no Tapajós tramita no Ibama (in Portuguese), IHU: Instituto Humanitas Unisinos
- Switkes, Glenn (5 June 2009), "Relatório Preliminar sobre o Inventário Hidrelétrico da Bacia do Tapajós", International Riverd (in Portuguese)
- "Tapajós Basin Dams", International Rivers
