= Jamanxim Dam =

- Location within Brazil
- Official name: Barragem Jardim Jamanxim
- Country: Brazil
- Location: Itaituba, Pará
- Coordinates: 5.658876°S 55.874181°W
- Purpose: Hydroelectric
- Status: Planned

Dam and spillways
- Impounds: Jamanxim River
- Height (thalweg): 72 metres (236 ft)

Reservoir
- Surface area: 7,400 hectares (18,000 acres)

Power Station
- Turbines: 3 Francis turbines
- Installed capacity: 881 megawatts (1,181,000 hp)

The Jamanxim Dam (Portuguese: Barragem Jamanxim) is a proposed hydroelectric dam on the Jamanxim River in the state of Pará, Brazil.

== Location ==
The Jamanxim Dam is proposed to be built on the Jamanxim River in the state of Pará, in the Tapajós river basin. It would be built in the municipality of Itaituba. The dam would flood 8,516 hectares (21,040 acres) of the Jamanxim National Park. It would affect the South Amazon Ecotones Ecological Corridor.

The hydroelectric power plant will be part of the proposed 12,000 megawatts (16,000,000 hp) Tapajós hydroelectric complex on the Tapajós and Jamanxim rivers. Others are the São Luiz do Tapajós (6,133 MW), Jatobá (2,338 MW), Cachoeira do Cai (802 MW) and Cachoeira dos Patos (528 MW), all under study, as well as the Chacorão (3,336 MW) and Jardim do Ouro (227 MW).

== Technical ==
The dam would be 72 metres (236 ft) high, containing a reservoir with an area of 7,445 hectares (18,400 acres). The planned power plant would have potential of 881 megawatts (1,181,000 hp), with guaranteed capacity of 475 megawatts (637,000 hp). The plant would contain 3 Francis turbines, handling a flow of 1,366 cubic metres per second (48,200 cu ft/s).

Estimated cost would e US$984 million. The project would be built by Eletrobras, Eletronorte, Construções e Comércio Camargo Côrrea, EDF Consultoria em Projetos de Geração de Energia, Endesa Brasil, EPP Energia Elétrica, Promoção e Participações, Neoenergia Investimentos and Odebrecht.

== Planning process ==
On 20 January 2016 it was reported that the deadline for the feasibility study for the Jatobá plant had been extended to December 2016, and the deadline for the Jamanxim plant feasibility study was now 31 December 2017.

A "platform" approach is proposed for construction to minimise environmental impact. There would be no access roads, and workers would be taken to the site by helicopter. After construction is complete the site would be regenerated.

== Sources ==
- "Brazil sets concession auction for 8,040-MW Sao Luiz do Tapajos hydro project", Hydro World, Brasilia: PennWell Corporation, 17 September 2014
- Couto, Fábio (7 May 2010), "Usinas-plataforma: aposta no baixo impacto", Canal Energia (in Portuguese), Eletronorte, archived from the original on 2017-02-14
- "Jatobá Perfil da usina", Barragens na Amazônia (in Portuguese), archived from the original on 2017-12-31
- "Jamanxim Perfil da usina", Barragens na Amazônia (in Portuguese), archived from the original on 2017-04-02
- "Prazo para entrega de estudos da UHE Jatobá é prorrogado até dezembro", Portal PCH (in Portuguese), 20 January 2016, archived from the original on 18 February 2017
- "Tapajós Basin Dams", International Rivers
