= Cachoeira do Cai Dam =

Planned hydroelectric dam in Pará, Brazil

- Location within Brazil
- Official name: Barragem de Cachoeira do Cai
- Country: Brazil
- Coordinates: 4.998491°S 56.455739°W
- Purpose: Hydroelectric
- Status: Planned

Dam and spillways
- Impounds: Jamanxim River

Reservoir
- Surface area: 42,000 hectares (100,000 acres)

Power Station
- Installed capacity: 802 megawatts (1,075,000 hp)

The Cachoeira do Cai Dam (Portuguese: Barragem de Cachoeira do Cai) is a planned hydroelectric dam on the Jamanxim River in the state of Pará, Brazil, with a capacity of 802 megawatts (1,075,000 hp).

== Location ==
Sketch map showing locations of dams

The Cachoeira do Cai Dam is proposed to be built on the Jamanxim River in the state of Pará, in the Tapajós river basin. It would adjoin the Sawré Muybu Indigenous Territory, which lies between the Jamanxim and the Tapajós in the region above the point where the two rivers converge. The hydroelectric power plant would be part of the proposed 12,000 megawatts (16,000,000 hp) Tapajós hydroelectric complex on the Tapajós and Jamanxim rivers. Others are the São Luiz do Tapajós (6,133 MW), Jatobá (2,338 MW), Cachoeira dos Patos (528 MW) and Jamanxim (881 MW), all under study, as well as the less advanced proposals for the Jardim do Ouro (227 MW) and Chacorão (3,336 MW).

== Technical ==
The project is a joint venture of Eletrobras, Eletronorte, Construções e Comércio Camargo Côrrea, EDF Consultoria em Projetos de Geração de Energia, EPP Energia Elétrica and Promoção e Participações. The project is estimated to cost US$1.1 billion. The reservoir would have an area of 42,000 hectares (100,000 acres). The plant would have a capacity of 802 megawatts (1,075,000 hp).

A "platform" approach is proposed for construction to minimise environmental impact. There would be no access roads, and workers would be taken to the site by helicopter. After construction is complete the site would be regenerated.

== Impact ==
The reservoir would flood 15,690 hectares (38,800 acres) of the Jamanxim National Park, 6,800 hectares (17,000 acres) of the Itaituba I National Forest and 20,470 hectares (50,600 acres) of the Itaituba II National Forest. The official estimate is that 150 people will be affected. A study released in December 2015 took into account carbon and methane emissions from the reservoir and from construction and concluded that there was a high probability that the plant would generate emissions comparable to a natural gas plant, and a possibility that emissions could exceed those of a coal-fired plant.

== Sources ==
- "Brazil sets concession auction for 8,040-MW Sao Luiz do Tapajos hydro project", Hydro World, Brasilia: PennWell Corporation, 17 September 2014
- "Cachoeira do Caí Perfil da usina", Barragens na Amazonia (in Portuguese), archived from the original on 2017-12-31
- Fellet, João (12 January 2016), "Estudo alerta para emissões de novas hidrelétricas na Amazônia", BBC Brasil, Washington
- "Jatobá Perfil da usina", Barragens na Amazônia (in Portuguese), archived from the original on 2017-12-31
- Switkes, Glenn (5 June 2009), "Relatório Preliminar sobre o Inventário Hidrelétrico da Bacia do Tapajós", International Riverd (in Portuguese)
- "Tapajós Basin Dams", International Rivers
