= Tapajós hydroelectric complex =

Proposed dams in Pará, Brazil

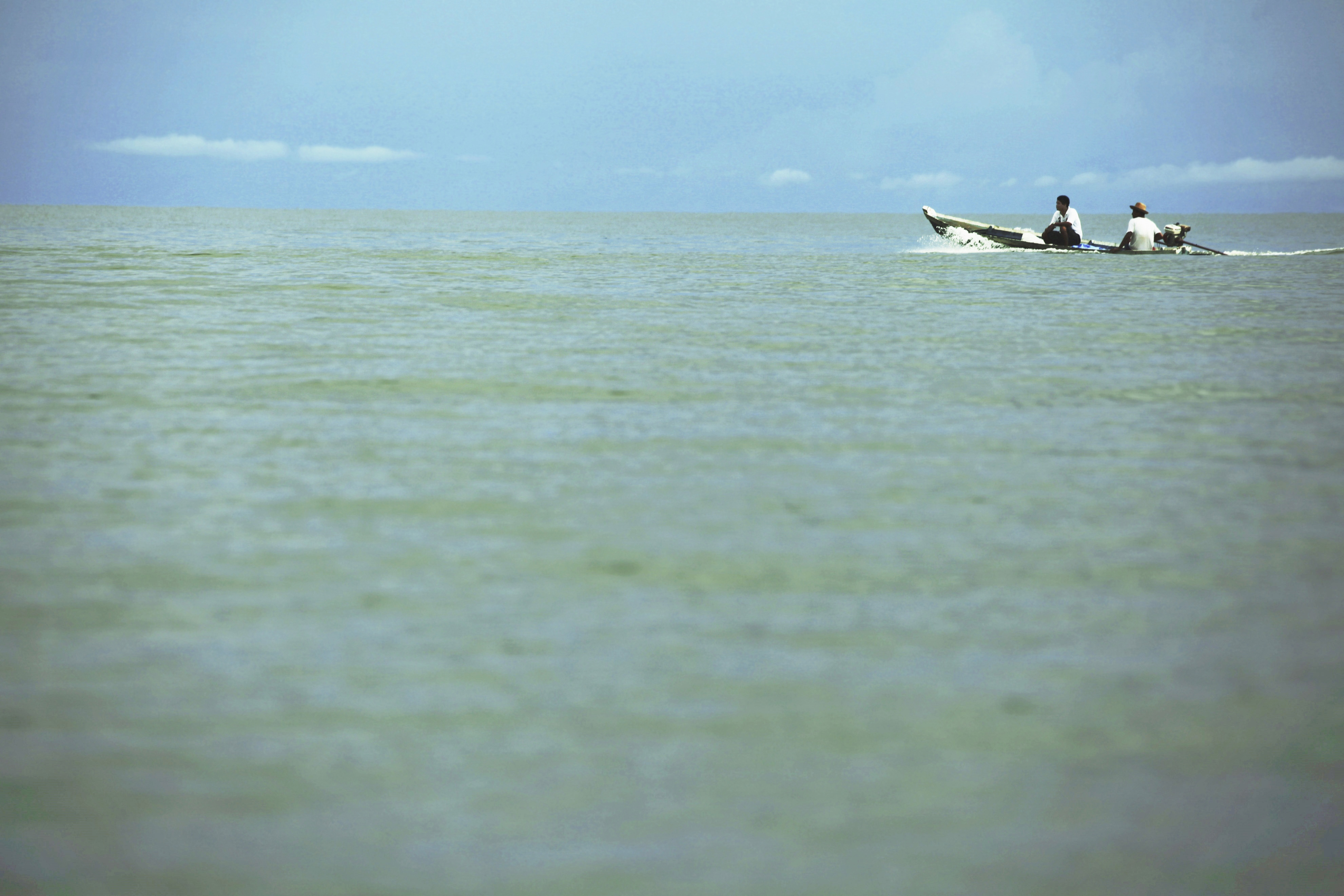
- Tapajós River

- Location of São Luiz do Tapajós
- Official name: Complexo Hidrelétrico de Tapajós
- Coordinates: 4.603722°S 56.2845°W
- Status: Proposed
- Owner: Eletronorte etc.

Dam and spillways
- Impounds: Tapajós, Jamanxim rivers

Power Station
- Installed capacity: 10,682 MW

The Tapajós hydroelectric complex (Portuguese: Complexo Hidrelétrico de Tapajós) is a proposed complex of hydroelectric dams on the Tapajós and Jamanxim rivers in the state of Pará, Brazil. The Tapajós dams would contain locks, thus converting the river into a navigable waterway. A "platform" model is proposed under which all people and material would be moved by river or by helicopter, avoiding the need to build access roads and the consequent inflow of settlers and environmental damage. However, there have been protests against flooding of indigenous territory by the dams, and the largest dam seems unlikely to be approved.

== Dams and power plants ==
The proposed Tapajós hydroelectric complex would impound sections of the Tapajós and Jamanxim rivers. The Tapajós River Hydroelectric Complex would have a total installed capacity of 10,682 MW. Eletronorte estimated that the project would deliver power equivalent to that provided by burning 30.5 million barrels of oil annually. The proposed dams being studied are:

Plant	Capacity	Guaranteed capacity	Dam Height (m)	Turbines	Type	Reservoir (km^{2})	Flow (m^{3}/s)
São Luiz do Tapajós	8,040	4,012	39.0	38	Kaplan	729.00	11,890
Jatobá	2,338	1,282	35.5	40	Bulb	646.30	10,423
Jamanxim	881	475	72.0	3	Francis	74.45	1,366
Cachoeira do Cai	802	418	39.0	5	Kaplan	420.00	1,940
Cachoeira dos Patos	528	272	34.3	3	Kaplan	116.50	1,327

São Luiz do Tapajós would have guaranteed capacity of 4,012 MW from 38 Kaplan turbines. The dam on the Tapajós would be 7,608 metres (24,961 ft) long and 53 metres (174 ft) high and would impound a reservoir of 729 square kilometres (281 sq mi). (Note: The São Luiz do Tapajós reservoir would cover 729 square kilometres (281 sq mi), but if the area already covered by the river is discounted the area flooded would be just 376 square kilometres (145 sq mi). Similarly, the Jatobá reservoir would cover 646.3 square kilometres (249.5 sq mi) but only 204 square kilometres (79 sq mi) would be newly flooded land.) There would be 17 locks, 19.6 metres (64 ft) wide and 20 metres (66 ft) high, in the spillway. The Jatobá Dam, also on the Tapajós, would be upstream from São Luiz do Tapajós. It would have 2,338 MW capacity, with 1,282 MW guaranteed, from 40 bulb turbines. The dam would be 1,287 metres (4,222 ft) long and 35.5 metres (116 ft) high impounding a reservoir of 646.3 square kilometres (249.5 sq mi). The 40 metres (130 ft) spillway would have 14 locks 18.9 metres (62 ft) wide and 20 metres (66 ft) high. The other three plants under study would be on the Jamanxim River.

The complex may also include the Chacorão (3,336 MW) on the upper Tapajós and the Jardim do Ouro (227 MW) on the Jamanxim. These have not yet been studied in detail.

== Waterway ==
The dams are part of a plan to convert the Tapajos into a waterway for barges to take soybeans from Mato Grosso to the Amazon River ports. A continuous chain of dams, with locks, would eliminate today's rapids and waterfalls. Legal and constitutional objections may be bypassed through "security suspensions." The Chacorão locks are listed as a priority in the National Waterways Plan (Brazil, MT 2010, p. 22). The dam's reservoir would eliminate the Chacorão rapids, allowing barge traffic above the dam's locks. The controversial Chacorão Dam is rarely discussed in the context of the Tapajós Basin developments, despite its central role in the plan.

== Platform model ==
The Tapajós projects are surrounded by conservation units with a total area of 200,000 square kilometres (77,000 sq mi), including the Amazônia National Park and the Itaituba I, Itaituba II and Jamanxim national forests. With the traditional construction model access roads are built to the plant, settlements form along the roads and around the plant, and there is widespread damage to the environment. This risk of damage to the native forest causes opposition to the projects.

The concept of building hydroelectric power plants in a similar way to offshore oil platforms was developed in 2004–05 planning sessions attended by Minister of the Environment Carlos Minc. With the platform model there would be minimal impact on the environment, with trees only cut down at the plant location, and the site later regenerated. All material and personnel would be transported by water or by helicopters. Transport costs will be higher but the need to build roads and other infrastructure will be avoided, so net costs may be lower.

== Impact ==
Sketch map showing locations of dams: 10. Sawré Muybu Indigenous Territory; 16. Sai Cinza Indigenous Territory; 17. Mundurucu Indigenous Territory

The project would affect at least 32 communities and 2,000 square kilometres (770 sq mi) of indigenous territory, mostly occupied by people of the Munduruku ethnic group. The São Luiz do Tapajós Dam would flood about 7% of the Sawré Muybu Indigenous Territory, and the Boa Fé village would have to be relocated. As of 2010 Eletronorte had not applied for registration with the National Electricity Agency to start feasibility studies for the Chacorão plant, since it would flood parts of the Mundurucu and Sai-Cinza indigenous territories. A spokesman said that without a decree to regulate the constitution there was no way to undertake projects in indigenous territories.

On the Jamanxim River, the Jamanxim Dam would flood 8,516 hectares (21,040 acres) of the Jamanxim National Park. It would affect the South Amazon Ecotones Ecological Corridor. The Cachoeira do Cai reservoir would flood 15,690 hectares (38,800 acres) of the Jamanxim National Park, 6,800 hectares (17,000 acres) of the Itaituba I National Forest and 20,470 hectares (50,600 acres) of the Itaituba II National Forest. The official estimate is that 150 people will be affected. The Cachoeira dos Patos reservoir would flood 9,000 hectares (22,000 acres) of the Jamanxim National Park and 360 hectares (890 acres) of the Jamanxim National Forest. It would also affect the area around the Tapajós Environmental Protection Area and the South Amazon Ecotones Ecological Corridor.

An analysis of the two Tapajós River plants published in 2014 concluded that forecasts of demand for electricity had been overstated, and plans did not take into account improvements in efficiency of energy use and the availability of new power sources such as solar and wind power. Taking into account the cost of the transmission system they concluded that the project was not cost-effective even when excluding factors such as loss of fishing and tourism revenue, water quality degradation and carbon emissions.

A study released in December 2015 took into account carbon and methane emissions from construction and from the Cachoeira do Cai and Cachoeira dos Patos reservoirs, and concluded that there was a high probability that the plants would generate emissions comparable to a natural gas plant. In the case of the Cachoeira do Caí there was a possibility that emissions could exceed those of a coal-fired plant.

== Planning and approval process ==
=== Inventory studies ===
The first surveys of the hydroelectric potential of the Tapajós River were made between 1986 and 1991, and the planning process resumed early in the 2000s. In 2009 Eletronorte, Camargo Corrêa and CNEC Engenharia undertook hydraulic inventory studies of the Tapajós and Jamanxim Rivers, which were approved by the Brazilian Electricity Regulatory Agency (Aneel). By 2010 the Brazilian Institute of Environment and Renewable Natural Resources (IBAMA) had started the licensing process for five dams on the Tapajós with a total reservoir area of about 2,000 square kilometres (770 sq mi). These would all be platform-based plants. According to the Energy Expansion Plan 2010–19 the first plant, São Luiz do Tapajós, was to be launched in 2011 and to start operating in 2016.

=== Indigenous peoples opposition ===
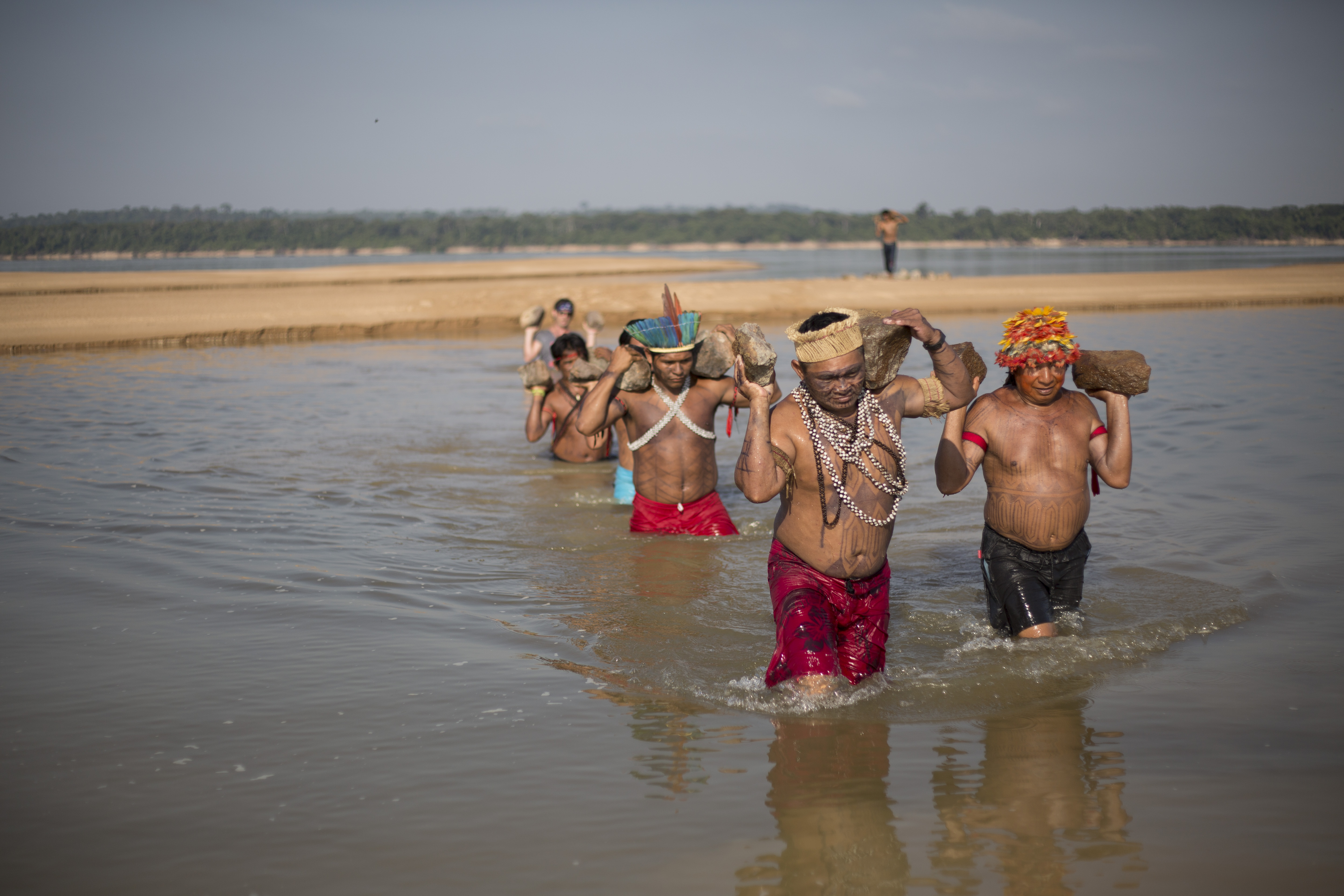
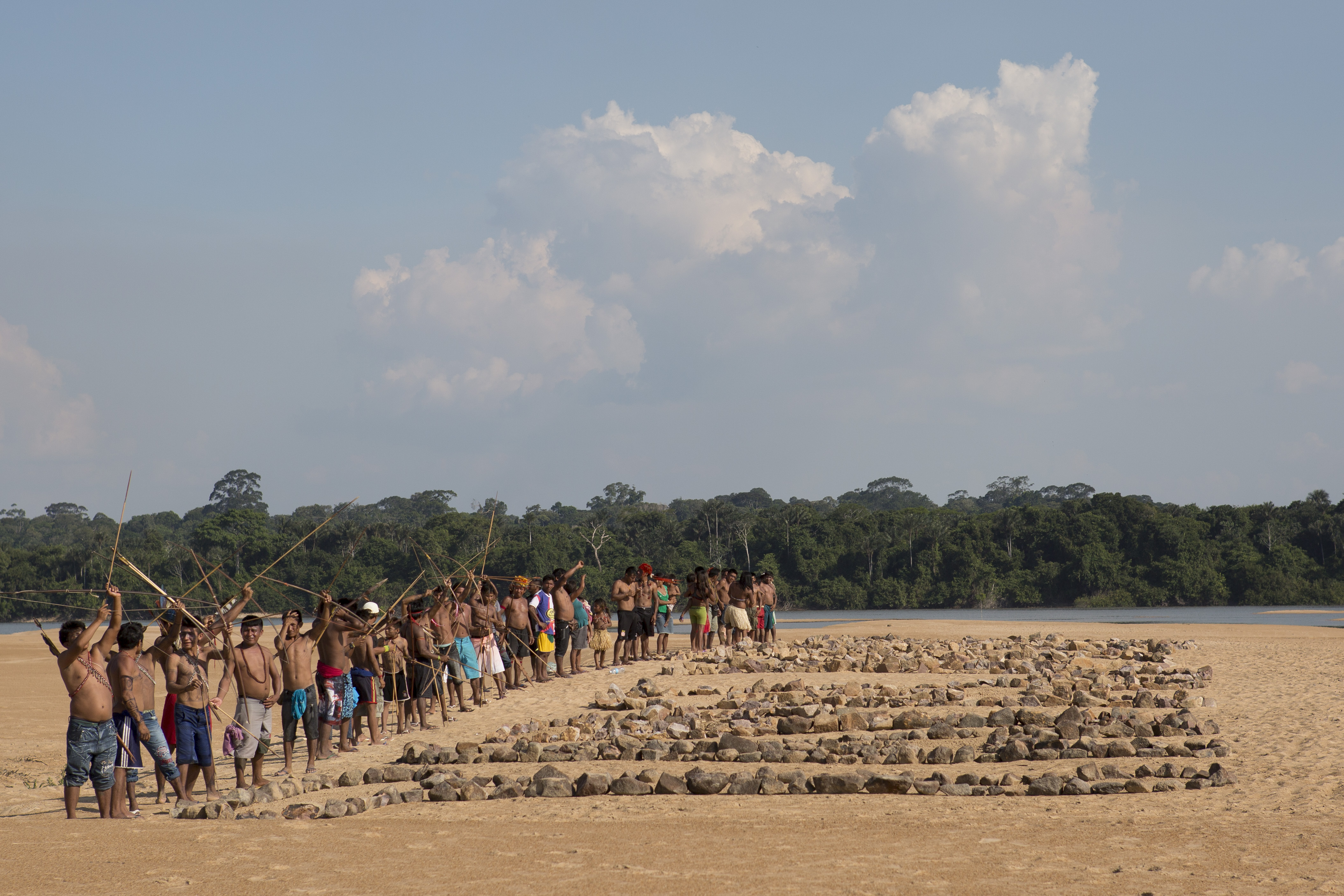
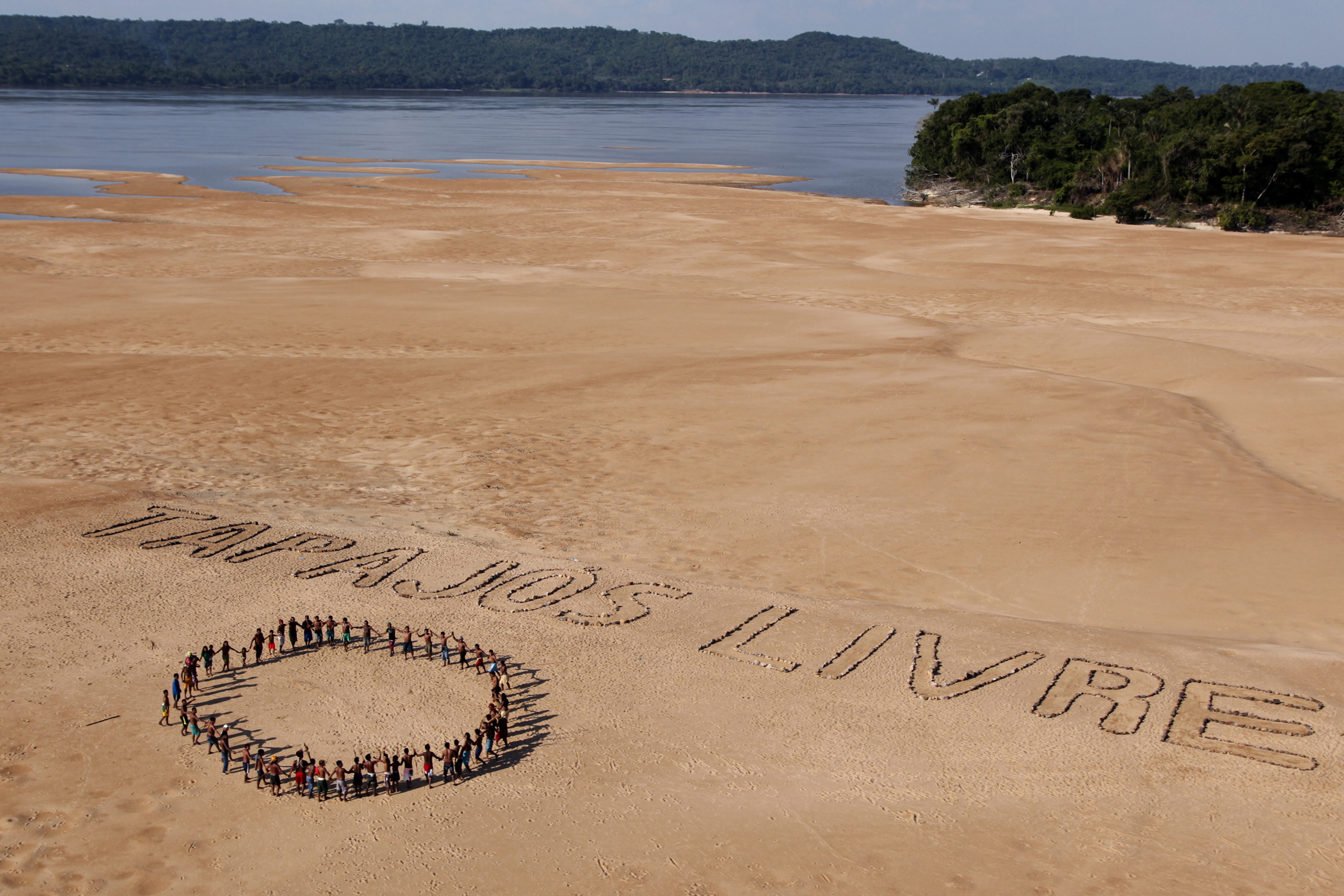
26 November 2014: Munduruku Indians and Greenpeace activists use stones to form the phrase "Tapajós Livre" on a beach on the banks of the Tapajós near Itaituba

In November 2012 tensions mounted when federal police in the region shot dead the Indian Adenilson Munduruku. On 3 April 2013 the Federal Public Ministry (MPF) asked for the federal government to suspend a military/police operation that was underway in the Tapajós region and to suspend studies and licensing for the São Luiz do Tapajós plant. The police and military were protecting a team of 24 researchers in the area, with more due to arrive. The MPF asked that the Munduruku Indians and the directly affected ribeirinhos communities first be consulted, as required by the International Labor Organization's Indigenous and Tribal Peoples Convention, 1989, to which Brazil subscribed in 2002. The MPF stated that the armed operation violated human rights, prevented any chance of dialog in good faith and would tend to create confrontation. On 16 April 2013 the Federal Regional Court of the 1st Region (TRF-1) in Brasilia ordered that the government suspend the military and police "Operation Tapajós" in the region of the Mundurucu Indigenous Territory.

Studies of the project and its impact halted in June 2013 when Indians opposed to the Tapajós developments took hostage three biologists working for Eletrobras. The three researchers were released after two days on 23 June 2013 after the federal government promised that the Eletrobras research projects would be suspended and the Indians consulted. On 12 August 2013 the Tapajós Study Group, which is responsible for analyzing the environmental viability of the hydroelectric projects on the river, was authorized by the federal government to resume research on the fauna and flora of the region. Eletrobras, which coordinates the study group, confirmed that it planned to submit Environmental Impact Studies to IBAMA for the São Luiz do Tapajós and Jatobá hydroelectric plants in December 2013. Other members of the study group are Eletronorte, GDF Suez, CEMIG, Copel, Neoenergia, Électricité de France, Endesa Brasil and Camargo Corrêa.

On 29 July 2013 the Federal Public Ministry recommended suspension of licensing of the Cachoeira dos Patos hydroelectric plant for the same reasons as other planned hydroelectric plants on the Tapajós, Teles Pires, Jamanxim and Juruena rivers. They had not undertaken an Integrated Environmental Assessment and had not consulted with the affected indigenous peoples, both legal requirements. The Ministry of the Environment informed the Federal Public Ministry in Santarém on 20 September 2013 that it had suspended licensing.

=== Further delays ===
In September 2014 the Ministry of Mines and Energy postponed the planned 15 December 2014 auction for the São Luiz do Tapajós plant until 2015. The delay was due to the need to adjust the studies to account for the indigenous component. The ministry still expected the plant to come into operation in 2020. In June 2015 it was announced that the auction of the São Luiz do Tapajós hydroelectric plant would not be held in 2015 as intended due to licensing problems, but was expected to take place in 2016. On 20 January 2016 it was reported that the deadline for the feasibility study for the Jatobá plant had been extended to December 2016, and the deadline for the Jamanxim plant feasibility study was now 31 December 2017.

After long delays, on 19 April 2016 the Fundação Nacional do Índio (National Indian Foundation, FUNAI) published a study that recognized the traditional nature of the occupation of the Sawré Muybu Indigenous Territory. This action followed the 17 April 2016 vote to impeach President Dilma Rousseff in the chamber of deputies. Also on 19 April 2016 the Brazilian Institute of Environment and Renewable Natural Resources (IBAMA) suspended environmental licensing for the São Luiz do Tapajós Dam. IBAMA stated that it was a coincidence that both actions occurred on the same day.

On 28 July 2016 the MPF recommended that IBAMA definitively cancel the licensing process for the São Luiz do Tapajós plant. Following the FUNAI study the plant was unconstitutional since the 1988 Constitution expressly prohibits removal of indigenous peoples from their lands. IBAMA had ten days to respond. In August 2016 IBAMA announced official cancellation of the São Luiz do Tapajós environmental license.

== Sources ==
- "Brazil sets concession auction for 8,040-MW Sao Luiz do Tapajos hydro project", Hydro World, Brasilia: PennWell Corporation, 17 September 2014
- "Cachoeira do Caí Perfil da usina", Barragens na Amazonia (in Portuguese), archived from the original on 2017-12-31
- "Cachoeira dos Patos Perfil da usina", Barragens na Amazonia (in Portuguese), archived from the original on 2017-12-31
- Complexo Hidrelétrico de Tapajós: custos e riscos do investimento (in Portuguese), ITA: Instituto Tecnológico de Aeronáutica
- Couto, Fábio (7 May 2010), "Usinas-plataforma: aposta no baixo impacto", Canal Energia (in Portuguese), Eletronorte, archived from the original on 2017-02-14
- "Environmental licence for São Luiz do Tapajós hydroelectric dam denied", Conservation news, 2016-08-04
- Farias, Elaíze (19 April 2016), "Funai reconhece território tradicional Sawré Muybu dos Munduruku", Amazônia Real (in Portuguese)
- Fearnside, Philip M. (2015), "Amazon dams and waterways: Brazil's Tapajo's Basin plans", Ambio, 44 (5): 426–439, doi:10.1007/s13280-015-0642-z, PMC 4510327, PMID 25794814
- Fellet, João (12 January 2016), "Estudo alerta para emissões de novas hidrelétricas na Amazônia", BBC Brasil, Washington
- Funai aprova estudos das Terras Indígenas Sawré Muybu (PA), Ypoi/Triunfo (MS), Sambaqui (PR) e Jurubaxi-Téa (AM) (in Portuguese), FUNAI, 19 April 2016
- Ghisi, Ednubia (27 March 2013), "Projetos para construção de hidrelétricas no rio Tapajós intensificam violações de direitos no Oeste do Pará", Terra de Direitos (in Portuguese)
- "Governo paralisa licenciamento da usina Cachoeira dos Patos, no Pará", G1 Globo (in Portuguese), 24 September 2013
- "Jamanxim Perfil da usina", Barragens na Amazônia (in Portuguese), archived from the original on 2017-04-02
- "Jatobá Perfil da usina", Barragens na Amazônia (in Portuguese), archived from the original on 2017-12-31
- "Justiça suspende operação Tapajós", Terra de Direitos (in Portuguese), 16 April 2013
- "Leilão da hidrelétrica de Tapajós fica para 2016", Da Redação (in Portuguese), 9 June 2015
- Leilão da usina hidrelétrica São Luiz do Tapajós, no Pará, fica para 2015 (in Portuguese), Reuters, 17 September 2014, archived from the original on 20 February 2017
- "MPF/PA recomenda ao Ibama que cancele o licenciamento da usina de São Luiz do Tapajós", Amazônia (in Portuguese), 2 August 2016, archived from the original on 2020-11-30
- "MPF pede suspensão da operação policial e estudos de usina no Tapajós/PA", Terra de Direitos (in Portuguese), 4 April 2013
- "Prazo para entrega de estudos da UHE Jatobá é prorrogado até dezembro", Portal PCH (in Portuguese), 20 January 2016, archived from the original on 2017-02-18
- Rodrigues, Alex (15 August 2013), Eletrobras diz que estudos de Impacto Ambiental do Complexo Tapajós ficam prontos em dezembro (in Portuguese), Agência Brasil
- Rodrigues, Alex (5 April 2013a), MPF volta a pedir suspensão de estudos sobre Complexo Tapajós, Agência Brasil
- Rodrigues, Alex (24 June 2013b), Mundurukus libertam biólogos após negociação com o governo (in Portuguese), Agência Brasil
- Sanson, Cesar (31 July 2013), Licenciamento de outra hidrelétrica no Tapajós tramita no Ibama (in Portuguese), IHU: Instituto Humanitas Unisinos
- Switkes, Glenn (5 June 2009), "Relatório Preliminar sobre o Inventário Hidrelétrico da Bacia do Tapajós", International Riverd (in Portuguese)
- Usinas do Tapajós (in Portuguese), Grupo de Estudos Tapajós
