= Chacorão Dam =

Proposed dam in Pará, Brazil

- Location within Brazil
- Official name: Barragem de Chacorão
- Country: Brazil
- Coordinates: 6.497717°S 58.323536°W
- Purpose: Hydroelectric
- Status: Planned

Dam and spillways
- Impounds: Tapajós river

Reservoir
- Surface area: 61,600 hectares (152,000 acres)

Power Station
- Installed capacity: 3,336 megawatts (4,474,000 hp)

The Chacorão Dam (or Chocorão Dam, Portuguese: Barragem de Chacorão) is a proposed dam on the Tapajós river in the state of Pará, Brazil. It would flood a section of rapids in the river, making them navigable by barges carrying soybeans to ports on the Amazon River. The dam would include locks for the barges and a hydroelectric power plant. It is controversial since it would flood a large area of an indigenous territory.

== Location ==
Sketch map showing locations of dams

The proposed Chacorão Dam would be built on the Tapajós river in the state of Pará. The hydroelectric power plant would be part of the proposed 14,000 megawatts (19,000,000 hp) Tapajós hydroelectric complex on the Tapajos and Jamanxim rivers. Others are the São Luiz do Tapajós (6,133 MW), Jatobá (2,338 MW), Cachoeira dos Patos (528 MW), Jamanxim (881 MW) and Cachoeira do Cai (802 MW) plants, all under study, as well as the less advanced proposal for the Jardim do Ouro (227 MW).

The São Luiz do Tapajós, Jatobá and Chacorão dams on the Tapajós would together flood 198,400 hectares (490,000 acres), including parts of the Amazônia and Juruena national parks and the Itaituba I and Itaituba II national forests. The Chacorão reservoir would affect the Munduruku, Kayabí and Apiacá indigenous people. It would flood 18,700 hectares (46,000 acres) of the Mundurucu Indigenous Territory.

== Technical ==
The dam was planned to have a reservoir of 61,600 hectares (152,000 acres). The power plant was planned to have a capacity of 3,336 megawatts (4,474,000 hp).

== Planning process ==
The dam is part of a plan to convert the Tapajos into a waterway for barges to take soybeans from Mato Grosso to the Amazon River ports. A continuous chain of dams, with locks, would eliminate today's rapids and waterfalls. Legal and constitutional objections may be bypassed through "security suspensions." The Chacorão locks are listed as a priority in the National Waterways Plan (Brazil, MT 2010, p. 22). The dam's reservoir would eliminate the Chacorão rapids, allowing barge traffic above the dam's locks. The controversial Chacorão Dam is rarely discussed in the context of the Tapajós Basin developments, despite its central role in the plan.

A "platform" approach is proposed for construction to minimise environmental impact. There would be no access roads, and workers would be taken to the site by helicopter. After construction is complete the site would be regenerated. As of 2010 Eletronorte had not applied for registration with the National Electricity Agency to start feasibility studies for the Chacorão hydroelectric power plant, since it would flood parts of the Mundurucu and Sai-Cinza indigenous territories. A spokesman said that without a decree to regulate the constitution there was no way to undertake projects in indigenous territories.

== Sources ==
- "Brazil sets concession auction for 8,040-MW Sao Luiz do Tapajos hydro project", Hydro World, Brasilia: PennWell Corporation, 17 September 2014, archived from the original on 2017-02-14
- "Chacorão Perfil da usina", Barragens na Amazônia (in Portuguese)
- Couto, Fábio (7 May 2010), "Usinas-plataforma: aposta no baixo impacto", Canal Energia (in Portuguese), Eletronorte
- Fearnside, Philip M. (2015), "Amazon dams and waterways: Brazil's Tapajo´s Basin plans", Ambio, 44 (5): 426–439, doi:10.1007/s13280-015-0642-z, PMC 4510327, PMID 25794814
- "Jatobá Perfil da usina", Barragens na Amazônia (in Portuguese), archived from the original on 2017-12-31
- "Tapajós Basin Dams", International Rivers
