= Sawré Muybu Indigenous Territory =

Indigenous territory in Pará, Brazil

- Terra Indígena Sawré Muybu
- Location within Brazil
- Nearest city: Itaituba, Pará
- Coordinates: 4°53′08″S 56°35′35″W
- Area: 178,173 ha (687.93 sq mi)
- Designation: Indigenous territory
- Created: 19 April 2016 (delimitation)

The Sawré Muybu Indigenous Territory (Portuguese: Terra Indígena Sawré Muybu), also called the Daje Kapap Eipi, is an indigenous territory of Munduruku people in the state of Pará, Brazil. It includes land that is sacred to the Mundurukus. Issuance of the document that delimits the territory was delayed until April 2016 because of the problems recognition would create with the proposed São Luiz do Tapajós Dam, which would flood part of the area. As of November 2016 the territory had still not been formally created by decree.

== Location ==
Sketch map of Tapajos River: 10. Sawré Muybu Indigenous Territory

The Sawré Muybu Indigenous Territory is in the municipalities of Itaituba and Trairão, in the Middle Tapajós, in the southwest of Pará state. The Sawré Muybu is located on the right (east) bank of the Tapajós river to the south of the town of Itaituba, Pará. It is bounded by the Tapajós to the west and its tributary the Jamanxim River to the east, and includes the land down to the juncture of the two rivers to the north. The territory is composed of very fertile "black Indian land". It has an area of 178,173 hectares (440,280 acres). The territory is threatened by proposed dams and by illegal loggers and diamond miners.

== People ==
Sawré Muybu is one of the territories of the Munduruku people. Sawré Muybu is called "Daje Kapap Eypi" by the Munduruku. It contains the "Fecho" and "Ilha da Montanha" sacred sites, where Karosakaybu created mankind and the Tapajós River from the tucumã seed. In Munduruku mythology the "Fecho", a stretch where the river narrows, is the place where the river first emerged. Based on archeological studies by Bruna Cigaran Rocha and Vinicius Honorato de Oliveira the middle Tapajós would have been occupied by the Munduruku long before the 20th century. 19th century accounts mention Munduruku villages in the region. They were driven from the area by the advance of the rubber economy after 1900.

In the 1970s, after the decline of the rubber plantations, the Munduruku returned to the middle Tapajós and the sacred sites. The present population of Sawré Muybu are Munduruku who migrated there from the upper Tapajós in the second half of the 20th century, or their descendants. The Munduruku population had gone through a long period of decline due to contact with outside society, but was now recovering. As of 2013 the FUNAI gave estimated population of Sawré Muybu as 132 Munduruku people. In 2014 Siasi/Sesai reported that the population was 168. The indigenous organization Associação Indígena Pahyhy'p (AIP) is active in the territory.

== Dams ==
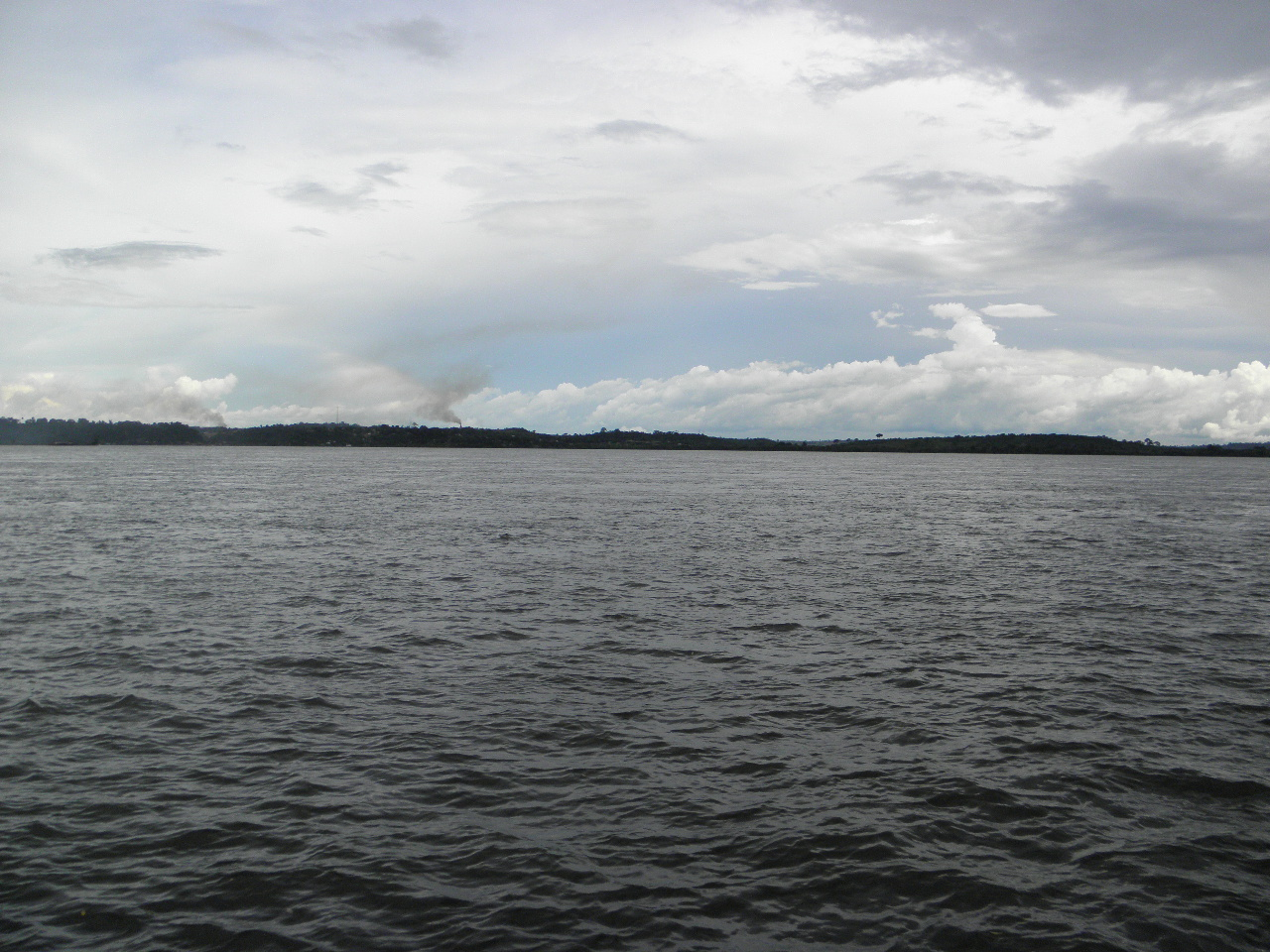
Tapajós River in Itaituba

The proposed São Luiz do Tapajós Dam on the Tapajós would be just downstream from the territory, and the proposed Cachoeira do Cai Dam on the Jamanxim would adjoin the east of the territory. The proposed Jatobá Dam on the Tapajós would be just upstream from the territory. If the São Luiz do Tapajós Dam is built about 7% of the territory would be flooded, and the Boa Fé village would have to be relocated. The territory coincided with part of the Itaituba II National Forest, which could not legally be flooded. In January 2012 President Dilma Rousseff reduced the limits of seven conservation units, including Itaituba II. The area occupied by the Munduruku was now no longer protected and could be flooded by the reservoir of the hydroelectric dam.

Government-funded studies suggested that the Munduruku should be relocated, a proposal fiercely opposed by the 13,000 Munduruku people who live along the Tapajós and its tributaries, and whose way of life is threatened by other dams in the region. The Fundação Nacional do Índio (National Indian Foundation, FUNAI) has stated that this would be unconstitutional. Supporters of the plan said the constitutional protection of the Munduruku did not apply since the territory had not been officially demarcated.

== Recognition process ==
=== Preparation of the study ===
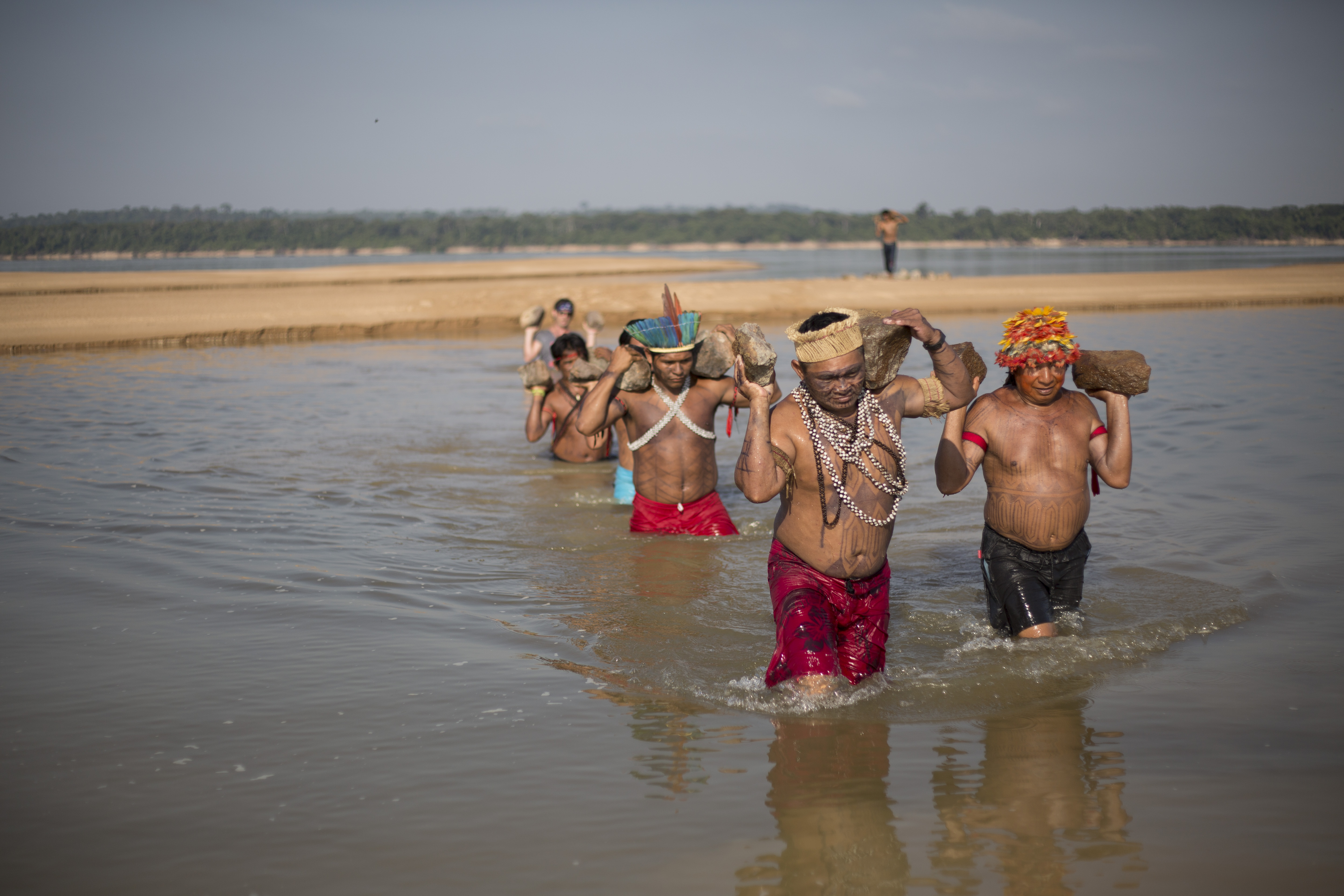
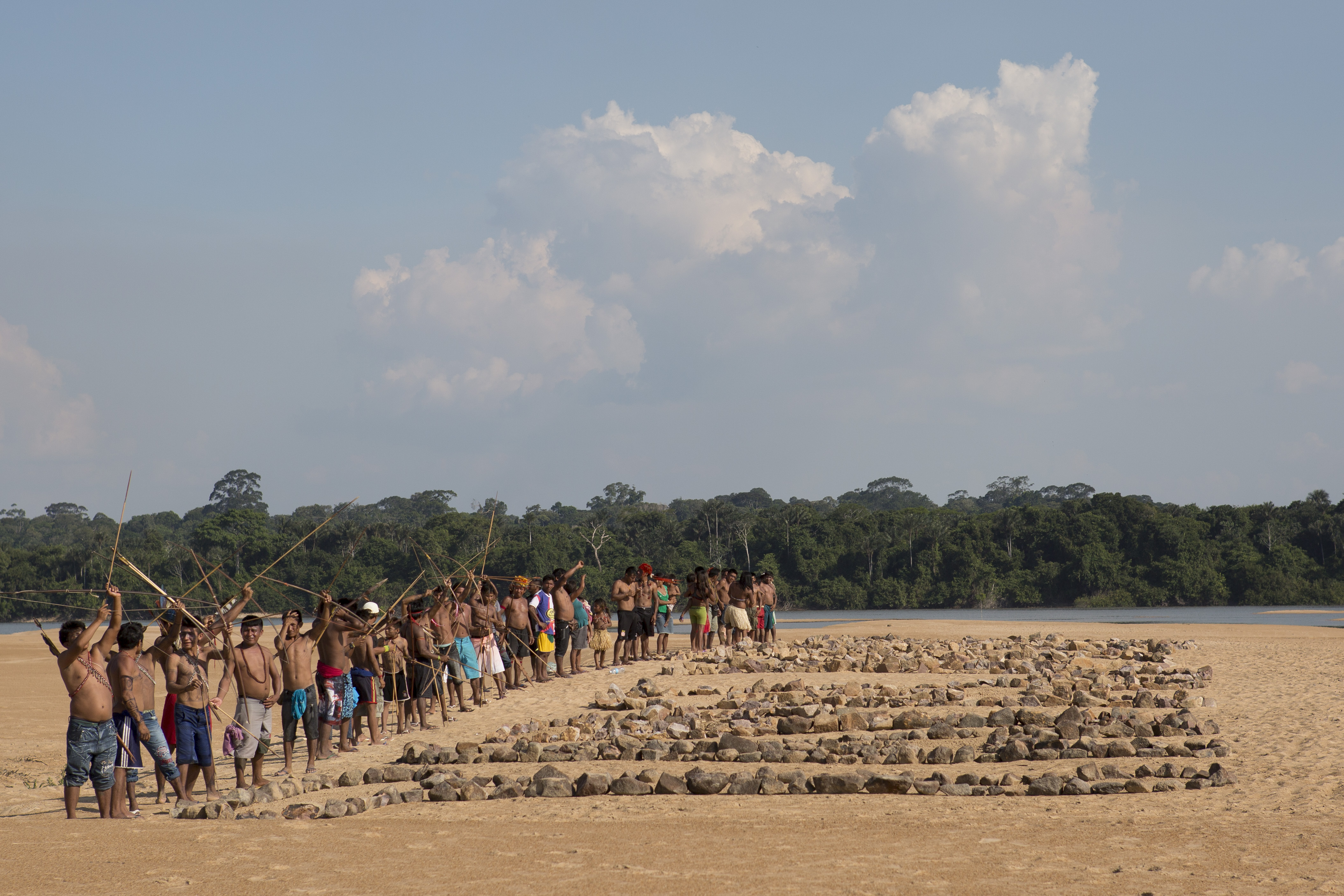
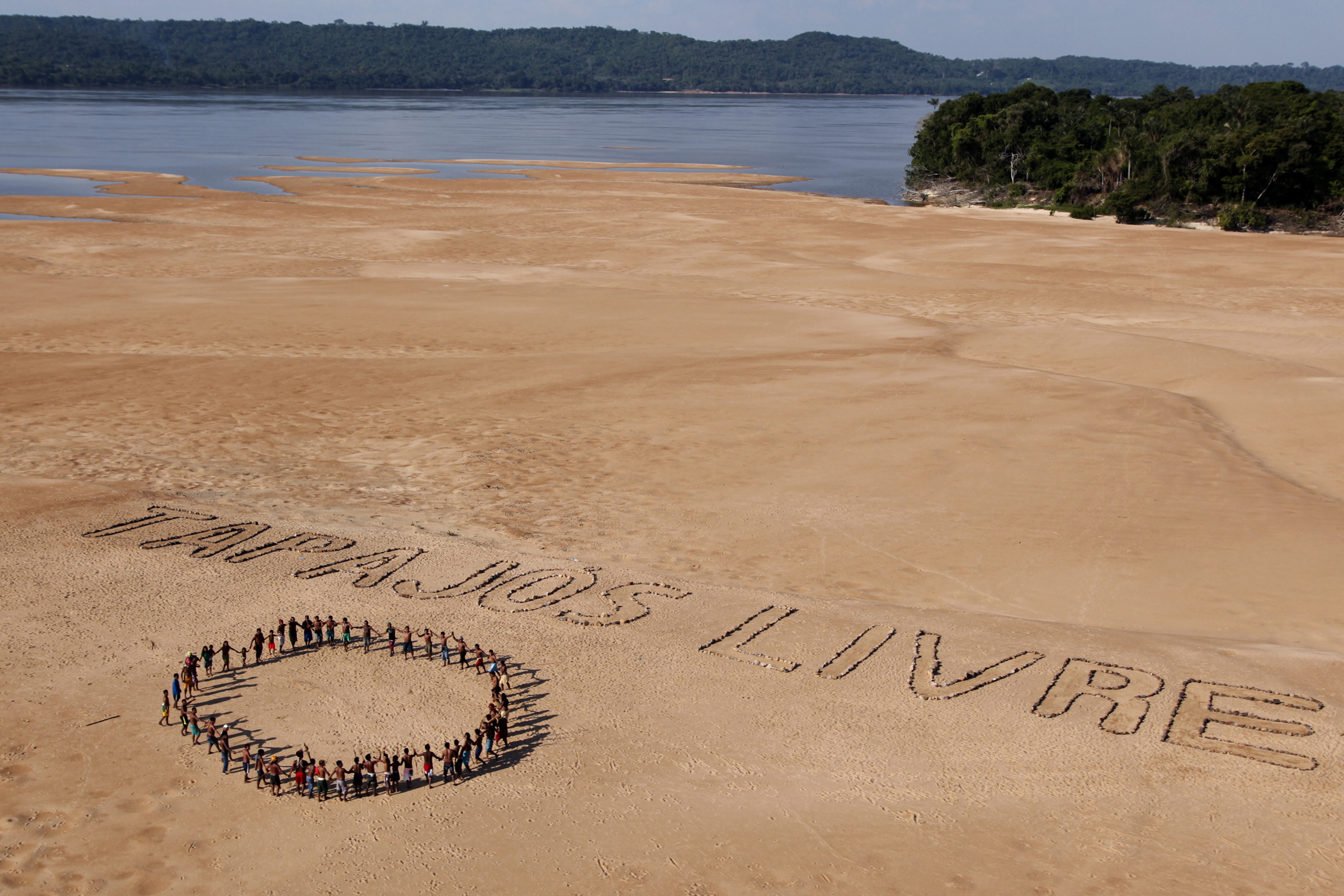
Munduruku Indians and Greenpeace activists use stones to form the phrase "Tapajós Livre" on the sands of a beach on the banks of the Tapajós near Itaituba

The demarcation process was initiated by FUNAI decree 1.099 of 13 November 2007 and renewed by further decrees in 2008, 2010 and 2012. The Relatório Circunstanciado (Circumstantial Report) was completed in 2013. The "Detailed Written Report of Identification and Delimitation of the Indigenous Land of Sawré Muybu", completed in September 2013, concluded that the state must acknowledge Sawré Muybu as an indigenous territory to guarantee that its residents' rights are respected. Publication was delayed. In 2014 the Munduruku began to demarcate the territory themselves, since FUNAI would not. In 2015 the Federal Justice of Pará, following an action by the Federal Public Prosecutor's Office, ordered FUNAI to publish the Circumstantial Report in the Federal Official Gazette. The Ipereg movement of Munduruku people received a UN award for their self-demarcation initiative at the end of 2015.

Early in April 2016 the Munduruku composed a letter to the government at their 26th Assembly in which they expressed concern over the energy policies of presidents Luiz Inácio Lula da Silva and Dilma Rousseff and said they would not accept construction of five hydroelectric plants of the Tapajós and Jamanxin Rivers. They pointed to the example of the inhabitants of the Tocantins River, who were still waiting for compensation more than 30 years after being expelled so the Tucuruí Dam could be built.

=== Publication ===
FUNAI finally published identification and delimitation studies of four indigenous lands on 19 April 2016, including the Sawré Muybu Indigenous Territory. FUNAI President João Pedro said that his agency recognized the traditional nature of the occupation of their lands by the indigenous peoples and was advancing with respect to guaranteeing the territory for them. Following publication there were 90 days for non-indigenous people living in the demarcated territory to contest the study or to demand compensation. After that it was expected that the President of Brazil would formally approve creation of the territories. This action followed the vote to impeach President Dilma Rousseff in the chamber of deputies on 17 April 2016. Also on 19 April 2016 the Brazilian Institute of Environment and Renewable Natural Resources (IBAMA) suspended environmental licensing for the São Luiz do Tapajós Dam. IBAMA stated that it was a coincidence that both actions occurred on the same day.

The move towards recognition of Sawre Muybu and other territories by the new administration was hailed as a great achievement by supporters of the rights of indigenous peoples. Recognition of the Sawré Muybu Indigenous Territory will force the government to take a new approach to dialog with the indigenous people over the proposed dams. New laws will be required to authorize flooding of the indigenous lands. Recognition should also help protect the territory from illegal loggers and miners.

=== Further delays ===
On 30 May 2016 Federal Public Prosecutor's Office (MPF) recommended that IBAMA cancel the licensing of the São Luiz do Tapajós hydroelectric plant. IBAMA asked for more time so it could study a presentation from Eletrobras that challenged FUNAI's understanding, claiming that the 1988 constitution only protected territories in existence when it was instituted. There were indications that the Federal Supreme Court would reject this argument on the basis that the constitutional rights of the indigenous people to the land they traditionally occupied was not dependent on the formal recognition status at any given time. On 28 July 2016 the MPF again recommended that IBAMA definitively cancel the licensing process. The April publication of the Circumstantial Identification and Delimitation Report (RCID) had made the plant unconstitutional, since the 1988 Constitution expressly prohibits removal of indigenous peoples from their lands. IBAMA had ten days to respond.

On 20 June 2016 it was reported that Munduruku Indians had decided to place signs on the boundaries of the territory themselves. Over the next two weeks they would install about 50 signs that would state that the area is protected and access by strangers is forbidden. Environmental activists would assist the Indians. The Indians asserted that of the 729 square kilometres (281 sq mi) São Luiz do Tapajós reservoir, at least 400 square kilometres (150 sq mi) would flood parts of Sawré Muybu. When asked about the legality of the signs, FUNAI would only say that the demarcation process was in a 90-day phase in which interested parties could challenge the agency's studies. After this the process would follow the Ministry of Justice procedure of declaration of limits and physical demarcation.

On 29 November 2016 about 80 leaders of the Indigenous Missionary Council (CIMI) and Greenpeace environmentalists protested at the Ministry of Justice in Brasília over delays in demarcation of the Sawré Muybu Indigenous Territory. They placed 180 arrows in the lawn of the ministry to represent the number of days that had been allowed for publishing the ordinance declaring the territory. They then occupied the ministry's meeting room, demanding to speak to Minister of Justice Alexandre de Morais. Instead, FUNAI President Agostinho do Nascimento Netto spoke to them. Walter Coutinho of FUNAI said the agency had not understood the challenges of the phase leading up to the decree.

== Sources ==
- Bezerra, Graziele (20 June 2016), Índios Munduruku interditam acesso à área Sawré Muybu, no Pará (in Portuguese), EBC: Empresa Brasil de Comunicação
- "Complexo hidrelétrico inundará território munduruku na Amazônia", Avispa Midia (in Portuguese), 22 January 2016, archived from the original on 2017-02-17
- Farias, Elaíze (19 April 2016), "Funai reconhece território tradicional Sawré Muybu dos Munduruku", Amazônia Real (in Portuguese)
- Fonseca, Bruno (6 January 2015), "Battle for the Tapajós: Brazil's Construction of Hydroelectric Dams Threatens the Munduruku People", Amazon Watch
- Funai aprova estudos das Terras Indígenas Sawré Muybu (PA), Ypoi/Triunfo (MS), Sambaqui (PR) e Jurubaxi-Téa (AM) (in Portuguese), FUNAI, 19 April 2016
- Klein, Tatiane; Harari, Isabel (20 April 2016), Governo declara duas Terras Indígenas e identifica quatro (in Portuguese), ISA: Instituto Socioambiental, archived from the original on 2018-06-15
- Martins, Renata (30 November 2016), Mundurukus reivindicam demarcação de terra Sawré Muybu, no Médio Tapajós (in Portuguese), EBC: Empresa Brasil de Comunicação
- "MPF/PA recomenda ao Ibama que cancele o licenciamento da usina de São Luiz do Tapajós", Amazônia (in Portuguese), 2 August 2016, archived from the original on 2020-11-30
- Terra Indígena Sawré Muybu (Pimental) (in Portuguese), ISA: Instituto Socioambiental
