= Cupari River =

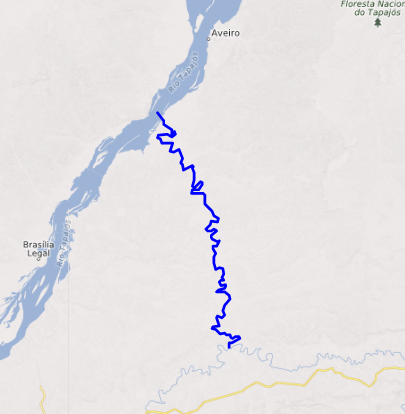
- Native name: Rio Cupari (Portuguese)

Location
- Country: Brazil

Physical characteristics
- Source
  - location: State of Pará
- Mouth
  - coordinates: 3.722778°S 55.404167°W

Basin features
- River system: Tapajós

The Cupari River (Portuguese: Rio Cupari) is a river that flows into the Tapajós in the Amazon rainforest of Brazil. Rio Cupari is in the eastern part of the Amazon River basin.

The river flows through the Itaituba I National Forest, a 220,639 hectares (545,210 acres) sustainable use conservation area established in 1998. Before entering the Tapajós it flows along the south west boundary of the Tapajós National Forest, a 549,067 hectares (1,356,770 acres) sustainable use conservation unit created in 1974.
