= Tocantins River (Jamanxim River tributary) =

- Location within Brazil
- Native name: Rio Tocantins (Portuguese)

Location
- Country: Brazil

Physical characteristics
- Mouth
  - coordinates: 5.376335°S 56.114412°W

Basin features
- River system: Jamanxim River

The Tocantins River (Portuguese: Rio Tocantins) is a river in the state of Pará, Brazil. It is a tributary of the Jamanxim River.

The river basin is in the Jamanxim National Park.
