= South Amazon Ecological Corridor =

- Corredor Sul da Amazônia
- Location within Brazil
- Coordinates: 5°05′02″S 53°42′58″W
- Area: 31,646,600 hectares (78,200,000 acres)
- Designation: Ecological corridor

The South Amazon Ecological Corridor (Portuguese: Corredor Sul da Amazônia) is a proposed ecological corridor connecting conservation units and indigenous territories in the southeast of the Amazon rainforest of Brazil.

== Background ==
The first version of the Ecological Corridors of Tropical Forests of Brazil proposal was developed by a group of consultants at the request of the Brazilian Ministry of the Environment and presented in the first half of 1997. Seven major corridors were proposed: the Central Amazon Ecological Corridor, Northern Amazon Ecological Corridor, South Amazon Ecological Corridor, South Amazon Ecotones Ecological Corridor, Western Amazon Ecological Corridor, Central Atlantic Forest Ecological Corridor and Serra do Mar Ecological Corridor. These corresponded to about 25% of the rainforests of Brazil. Priority was given to the Central Amazon Corridor and the Central Atlantic Forest Corridor, which would test and develop the concepts for use with the subsequent corridors.

== Proposed scope ==
The South Amazon Ecological Corridor was one of five Amazon region corridors identified. It included eight priority areas in three main Amazon ecoregions, and was identified as vulnerable, locally important, and moderate priority at a regional level in a 1994 Miami workshop. The proposed corridor mostly lies in the state of Pará, but extends west into Amazonas and east across the north of Tocantins into Maranhão. The corridor would have an area of 31,646,600 hectares (78,200,000 acres).

Conservation units would include the Tapajós-Arapiuns Extractive Reserve, Urariá Sustainable Development Reserve, Xingu National Forest (now part of the Terra do Meio Ecological Station), Tapajós National Forest, Maués State Forest, Amazônia National Park, Itaituba II National Forest, Tapirapé-Aquiri National Forest, Gurupi Biological Reserve, Tapirapé Biological Reserve and Carajás National Forest.

== Sources ==
- Arruda, Moacir Bueno; Nogueira de Sá, Luís Fernando S. (2003), Corredores Ecológicos: Uma abordagem integradora de ecossistemas no Brasil (PDF) (in Portuguese), Brasília: IBAMA
- Ayres, José Márcio; Da Fonseca, Gustavo A. B.; Rylands, Anthony B.; Queiroz, Helder L.; Pinto, Luiz Paulo; Masterson, Donald; Cavalcanti, Roberto B. (2005), Os Corredores Ecológicos das Florestas Tropicais do Brasil (PDF) (in Portuguese), Sociedade Civil Mamirauá
- Corredores Ecológicos na Mata Atlântica (in Portuguese), RBMA: Atlantic Forest Biosphere Reserve
- O Corredor Central Da Mata Atlãntica (PDF) (in Portuguese), MMA: Ministry of the Environment (Brazil)
