= Munduruku =

Indigenous people of Brazil

Mundurucu
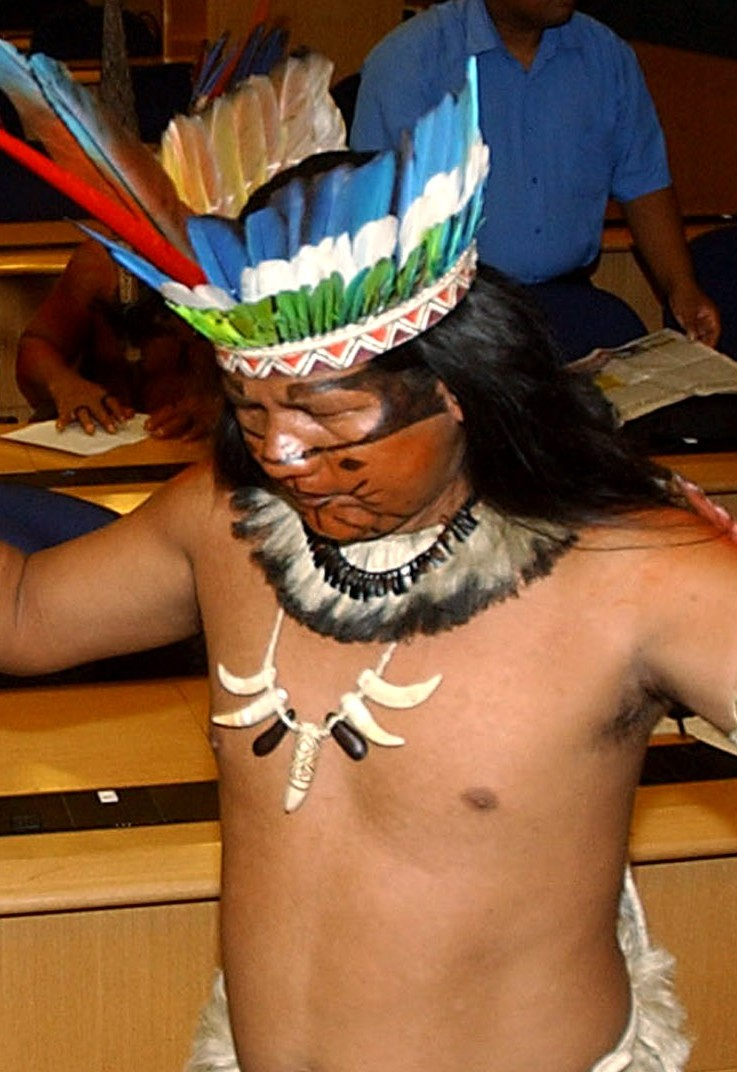

Total population
- 13,755 (2014)

Regions with significant populations
- Brazil (Amazonas, Mato Grosso, Pará)

Languages
- Munduruku, Portuguese

The Munduruku, also known as Mundurucu or Wuy Jugu, are an Indigenous people of Brazil living in the Amazon River basin. Some Munduruku communities are part of the Coatá-Laranjal Indigenous Land. They had an estimated population in 2014 of 13,755.

== History ==
Traditionally the Munduruku's territory, called Mundurukânia in the 19th century, was the Tapajós river valley. In 1788, they completely defeated their ancient enemies the Muras. After 1803 they lived at peace with the Brazilians.

The Munduruku live in southwest of the state of Pará along the Tapajós river and its tributaries in the municipalities of Santarém, Itaituba and Jacareacanga, in the east of the state of Amazonas along the Canumã River in the municipality of Nova Olinda and the municipality of Borba, and in the north of the state of Mato Grosso in the Peixe River region in the municipality of Juara. They usually inhabit forest regions on the margins of navigable rivers, and their traditional villages are in "Tapajós fields", patches of savannah within the Amazon rainforest. The largest numbers live in the Munduruku Indigenous Territory, with most of the villages along the Cururu River, a tributary of the Tapajós.

Today the Munduruku face threats to their homelands from the dams of the Tapajós hydroelectric complex, illegal gold-panning, and a new waterway construction on the Tapajós River. The reservoir of the proposed Chacorão Dam on the Tapajós river would flood 18,700 hectares (46,000 acres) of the Munduruku Indigenous Territory. The reservoir of the proposed São Luiz do Tapajós Dam on the Tapajós would flood about 7% of the Sawré Muybu Indigenous Territory.

== Name ==
External videos
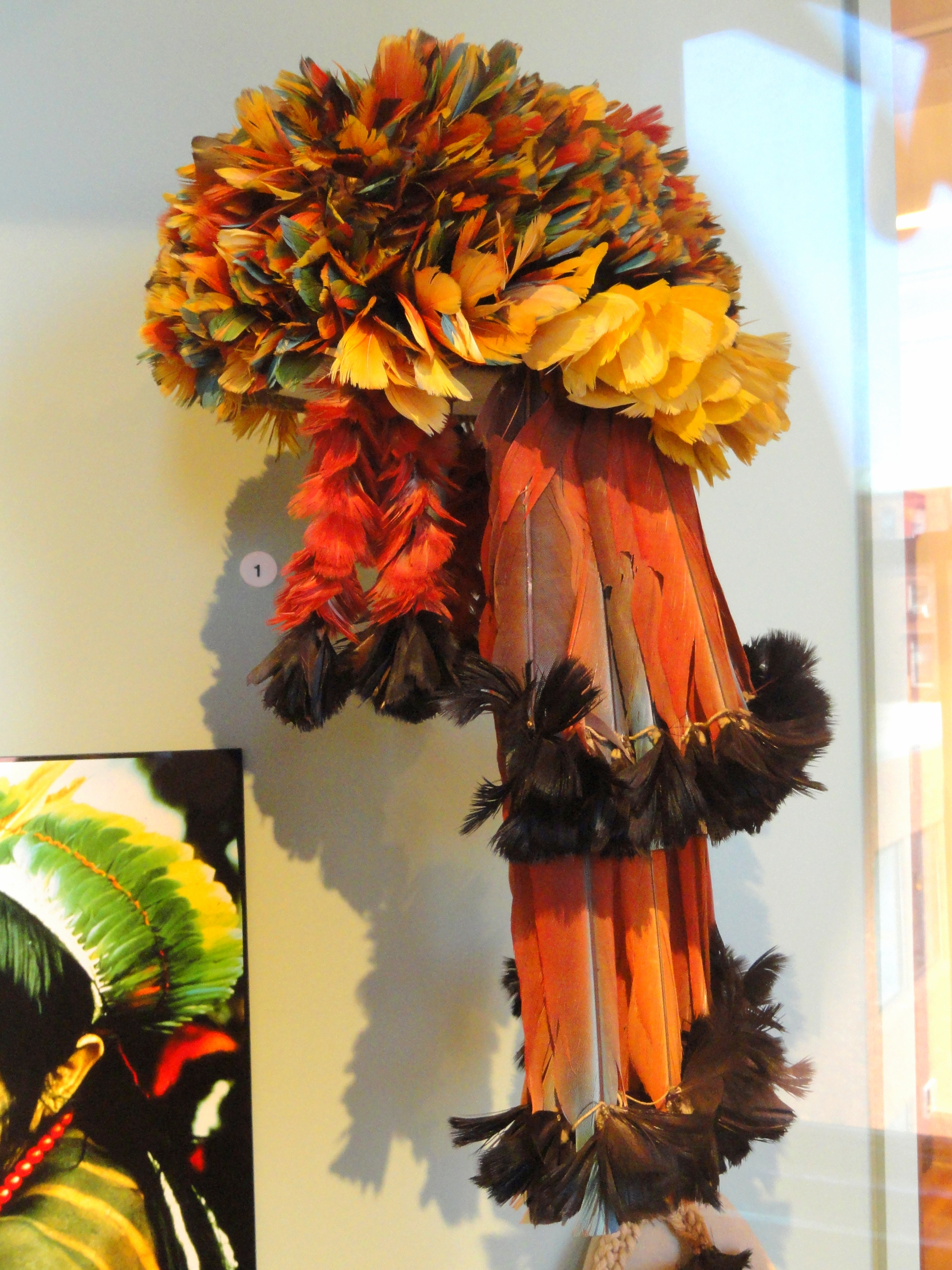
- Mundurukú Headdress: a glimpse of life in the Amazon rainforest, Smarthistory at Khan Academy

Also known as the Mundurucu, Maytapu, and Cara Preta, the Munduruku call themselves Wuy Jugu. Oral history says the name Munduruku comes from their enemies the Parintintin people and means ‘red ants’, based on the historical Munduruku tactic of attacking en masse.

== Culture ==
The Munduruku have a distinctive residence pattern. Rather than a pattern based on conjugal or affinal bonds, in Munduruku villages all males over the age of thirteen live in one household and all the females live with all of the males under thirteen in another..

Before the discovery of America by Columbus, a tribal ritual was practised by the Munduruku consisting of removing the skin from a man’s head and then drying it. The result was a smaller head used for religion purposes. This tribal practice is no longer carried out but many "smaller heads" can still be seen in museums around the world.

The Munduruku hold religious beliefs in multiple Supernatural Gamekeepers. Each creature they hunt is said to have a spiritual mother deity who oversees their children, ensuring the creatures return to the world after their death. By following certain rules of respect to the game the spirit mother will continue their rebirth. These beliefs effect how they interact with their environments and have and will create future impacts both positive and negative on the longevity of certain species.

== Language ==
The Munduruku language is part of the Tupi language family.

According to Gomes (2006), "widely known by Mundurukú, the historically famous 'head cutters' call themselves wuyjuyu 'people’. Considered in the past 'one of the most warlike, powerful and intelligent tribes of Brazil (...)' (Hartt, 1884), this Brazilian indigenous community seeks today to 'cut off the head’ of enemies through dialogue. Not only territorial disputes are part of this 'war' but also disputes over health, linguistic, social and cultural education and self-preservation."

They are also notable for their linguistic separation of "us" (their tribe) from "them" (everyone else), the pariwat. Whereas they refer to themselves as the wuujuyû (our people), everyone else is spoken of as the equivalent of ‘prey’.

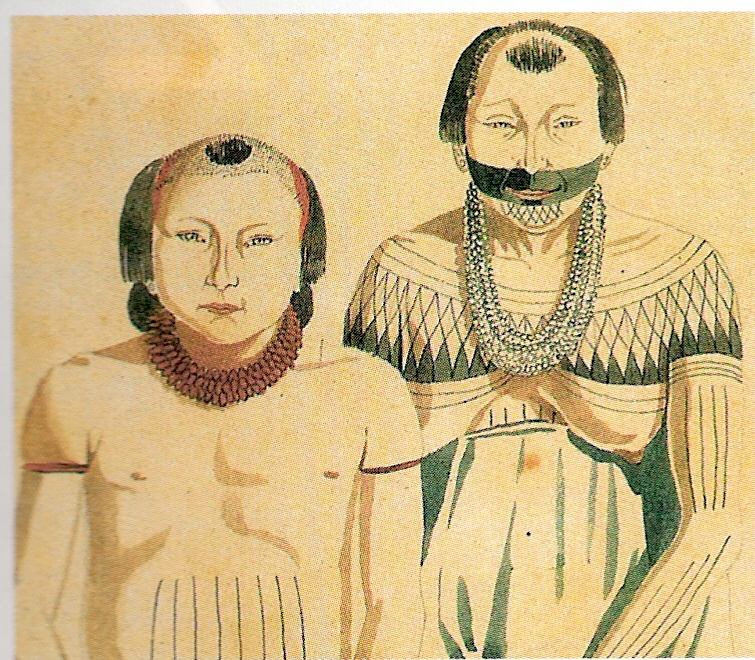
Munduruku Indians, painted by Hercules Florence

Unlike the Pirahã, the Munduruku have a numeracy system, albeit limited (similar to that found in some Aboriginal Australian cultures). Pierre Pica was instrumental (in a work done in collaboration with Stanislas Dehaene and Elizabeth Spelke) in revealing the psychophysics and linguistic properties of the Munduruku counting system to the Western world. The Munduruku have number words up to only five, although each word is not as definite in meaning as number words in English, and the lexical limitation is no obstacle to their making calculations involving larger numbers. Furthermore, the Munduruku use logarithmic mapping of numbers to assess scales, a point cited as possible evidence for the notion that this kind of numbering is innate, whereas the linear mode has to be acquired by study.

== Notable Munduruku ==
- Daniel Munduruku, educator, author, museum director

== Sources ==
- Bossomaier, Terry (2014). "Language Networks". In Stocker, Robert; Bossomaier, Terry (eds.). Networks in Society: Links and Language. CRC Press. pp. 49–79. ISBN 978-9-814-36482-9.
- Chacon, Richard J. (2023). "Supernatural Gamekeepers/Animal Masters Among the Munduruku (Wuy Jugu), Tukano, Embera and Achuar (Shiwiar) of the Neotropics". In Chacon, Richard J. (ed.). The History and Environmental Impacts of Hunting Deities. Cham: Springer Nature Switzerland. pp. 301–330. doi:10.1007/978-3-031-37503-3_14. ISBN 978-3-031-37502-6.
- Farias, Elaíze (19 April 2016). "Funai reconhece território tradicional Sawré Muybu dos Munduruku" [Funai recognises the traditional Sawré Muybu territory of the Munduruku]. Amazônia Real (in Portuguese).
- Fearnside, Philip M. (2015). "Amazon dams and waterways: Brazil's Tapajo's Basin plans". Ambio. 44 (5): 426–39. doi:10.1007/s13280-015-0642-z. PMC 4510327. PMID 25794814.
- Gomes, Dioney (2006). Morphological and syntactic study of the mundurukú language (tupí) (PDF) (PhD thesis) (in Brazilian Portuguese). University of Brasília.
- "Munduruku: Localização e população" (in Portuguese). ISA: Instituto Socioambeintal.
- Varley, Rosemary (2008). "Substance or Scafforld? The role of language in thought". In Joffe, Victoria; Cruice, Madeleine; Chiat, Shula (eds.). Language Disorders in Children and Adults: New Issues in Research and Practice. Wiley-Blackwell. pp. 20–38.
- Varshney, Lav R.; Sun, John Z. (2015). "Why Do We Perceive Logarithmically?". In Pitici, Mircea (ed.). The Best Writing on Mathematics 2014. Princeton University Press. pp. 64–73. ISBN 978-0-691-16417-5.
