= São Luiz do Tapajós Dam =

Proposed dam in Brazil

Coordinates: 4°36′13.4″S 56°17′04.2″W

The São Luiz do Tapajós Dam was a planned hydroelectric dam expected to be the third largest hydroelectric dam in Brazil, after Itaipu and Belo Monte Dam. It would have an installed capacity of 8,040 MW and its reservoir would cover about 400 km^{2} in the Tapajós river basin.

The plant would have been part of the proposed 12,000 megawatts (16,000,000 hp) Tapajós hydroelectric complex on the Tapajos and Jamanxim rivers. Others are the Jatobá, Cachoeira dos Patos, Jamanxim and Cachoeira do Cai dams, all in Pará state. In April 2016 IBAMA suspended the environmental licensing process for the dam due to its expected impacts on indigenous and river communities. In August that year, IBAMA finally announced the official cancellation of the project's environmental license, which effectively stopped the dam.

The conflict around the São Luiz do Tapajós mega dam has been referred as the next battle over saving the Amazon, as a result of its controversy involving Indigenous communities, the Brazilian government, large multinationals and international environmental organizations. Critics say the project will further result in deforestation and harm to the region's biodiversity, affecting the migratory movements of several species of ornamental fish and destroying nests of Macaw.

== Licensing process ==
The Brazilian environmental agency IBAMA first decided to suspend and ultimately cancel the environmental licensing process for the Tapajós mega dam in 2016, following a report published by the Brazilian bureau for Indigenous Affairs FUNAI. The report points out the infeasibility of the project from an indigenous perspective, since it would affect the land of the local Munduruku people. In its report, FUNAI recommends the demarcation of 1,780 square kilometers (687 square miles) of Munduruku land, the Sawré Muybu Indigenous Territory, in the vicinity of the proposed mega dam.
