= CTEEP =

Companhia de Transmissão de Energia Elétrica Paulista CTEEP
- Company type: Sociedade Anônima
- Traded as: B3: ISAE3, ISAE4
- Industry: Electricity
- Founded: 1999
- Headquarters: São Paulo, Brazil
- Key people: Luis Fernando Alarcón Mantilla (Chairman); César Augusto Ramírez Rojas (CEO)
- Products: Electric power
- Services: Electric power transmission
- Revenue: ▼US$ 814.7 million (2017)
- Net income: ▼US$ 392.2 million (2017)
- Number of employees: 1,416
- Parent: ISA
- Website: www.cteep.com.br

Companhia de Transmissão de Energia Elétrica Paulista (short form: Transmissão Paulista, abbreviation: CTEEP) is one of transmission system operators of electric power grid in Brazil. The company is headquartered in São Paulo.

It was created from the breakup of Companhia Energética de São Paulo in 1999. In November 2001, it merged the Empresa Paulista de Transmissão de Energia Elétrica, derived from the breakup of Eletropaulo Metropolitana - Electricidade São Paulo SA.

CTEEP is the main private concessionaire of the transmission of electrical energy, for transmission of 30% of all electricity produced in Brazil, which is almost 100% of the State of São Paulo. The company is present in 14 Brazilian states: Rio Grande do Sul, Santa Catarina, Paraná, São Paulo, Minas Gerais, Rondônia, Mato Grosso, Mato Grosso do Sul, Goiás, Tocantins, Maranhão, Piauí, Paraíba and Pernambuco. It owns 12,993 kilometres (8,073 mi) of transmission lines, 18,782 kilometres (11,671 mi) of circuits, 2,488 kilometres (1,546 mi) of fiber optic cables and 106 substations with voltage up to 550 kV with a total installed capacity of 45,131 MVA.

Since June 2006, the CTEEP is controlled by the Colombian company Interconexión Eléctrica S.A., which acquired 50.1% of its shares for auction sponsored by the Government of the State of São Paulo in B3 and today, holds 89.40% of the voting paper, equivalent to 37.5% of the total capital of CTEEP.
