= Luiz Pinguelli Rosa =

Brazilian physicist (1942–2022)

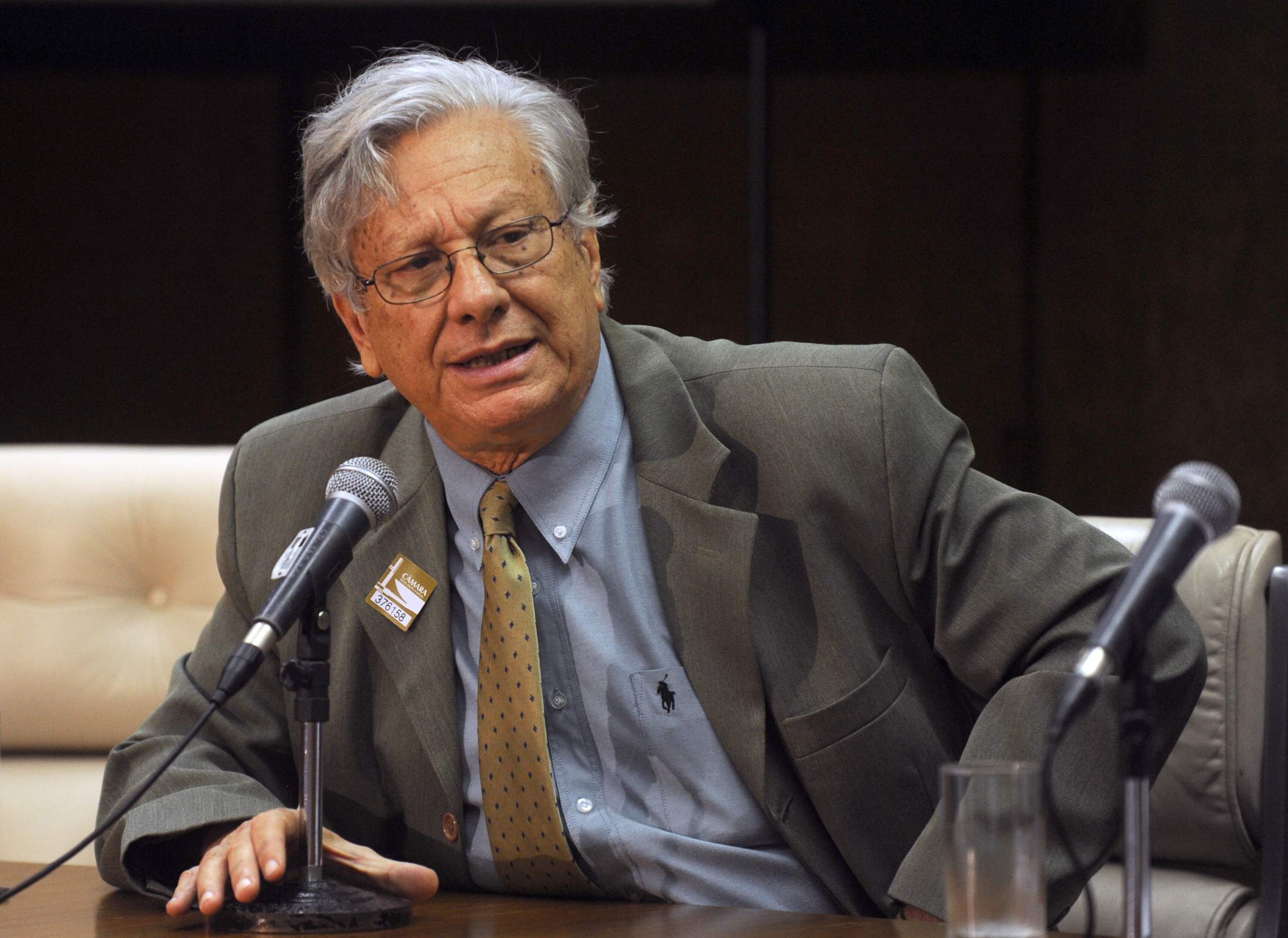
- Born: 19 February 1942; Rio de Janeiro, Brazil
- Died: 3 March 2022 (aged 80); Copacabana, Rio de Janeiro, Brazil
- Occupation: Nuclear physicist
- Organization: Federal University of Rio de Janeiro

Luiz Pinguelli Rosa (19 February 1942 – 3 March 2022) was a Brazilian scientist.

== Life and career ==
A nuclear physicist, researcher and professor at the Federal University of Rio de Janeiro, he was also a scientific leader. He was born in Brazil and lived in the city of Rio de Janeiro.

One of Rosa's fields of activity was renewable energy.

He was also scientifically and politically active in the field of nuclear energy.

Rosa died on 3 March 2022, at the age of 80, from COVID-19, during the COVID-19 pandemic in Brazil.
