= Axia Energia =

Brazilian electric utilities company

Axia Energia S.A.
- Formerly: Centrais Elétricas Brasileiras S.A. (1962–2025)
- Type: Public
- Traded as: B3: AXIA3, AXIA5, AXIA6
- Industry: Electricity
- Founded: 11 June 1962; 64 years ago
- Headquarters: Rio de Janeiro, Brazil
- Key people: Wilson Ferreira Júnior (CEO)
- Products: Electrical power
- Services: Electricity distribution Electric power transmission Electric power generation
- Revenue: ▲ R$44.4 billion (2021)
- Operating income: ▲ R$10.9 billion (2021)
- Net income: ▼ R$5.7 billion (2021)
- Owner: Brazilian Government (39.14%)
- Number of employees: 12,018 (2021)
- Website: axia.com.br

Axia Energia S.A. (previously known as Eletrobras, Portuguese pronunciation: [eˌlɛtɾoˈbɾas]) is a major Brazilian electric utilities company. The company's headquarters are located in Rio de Janeiro.

After its privatization in 2022, the company was renamed Axia Energia in 2025.

It is Latin America's biggest power utility company, tenth largest in the world, and is also the fourth largest clean energy company in the world, being the biggest renewable energy producer in the southern hemisphere. The company holds stakes in a number of Brazilian electric companies, so that it generates about 40% and transmits 69% of Brazil's electric supply. The company's generating capacity is about 51,000 MW, mostly in hydroelectric plants. The Brazilian federal government owned a 52% stake in the company until June 2022; the rest of the shares are traded on B3. The stock is part of the Ibovespa index. It is also traded on the Nasdaq Stock Market and on the Madrid Stock Exchange.

== History ==
Eletrobras was established in 1962 during João Goulart's presidency.

== Operations ==
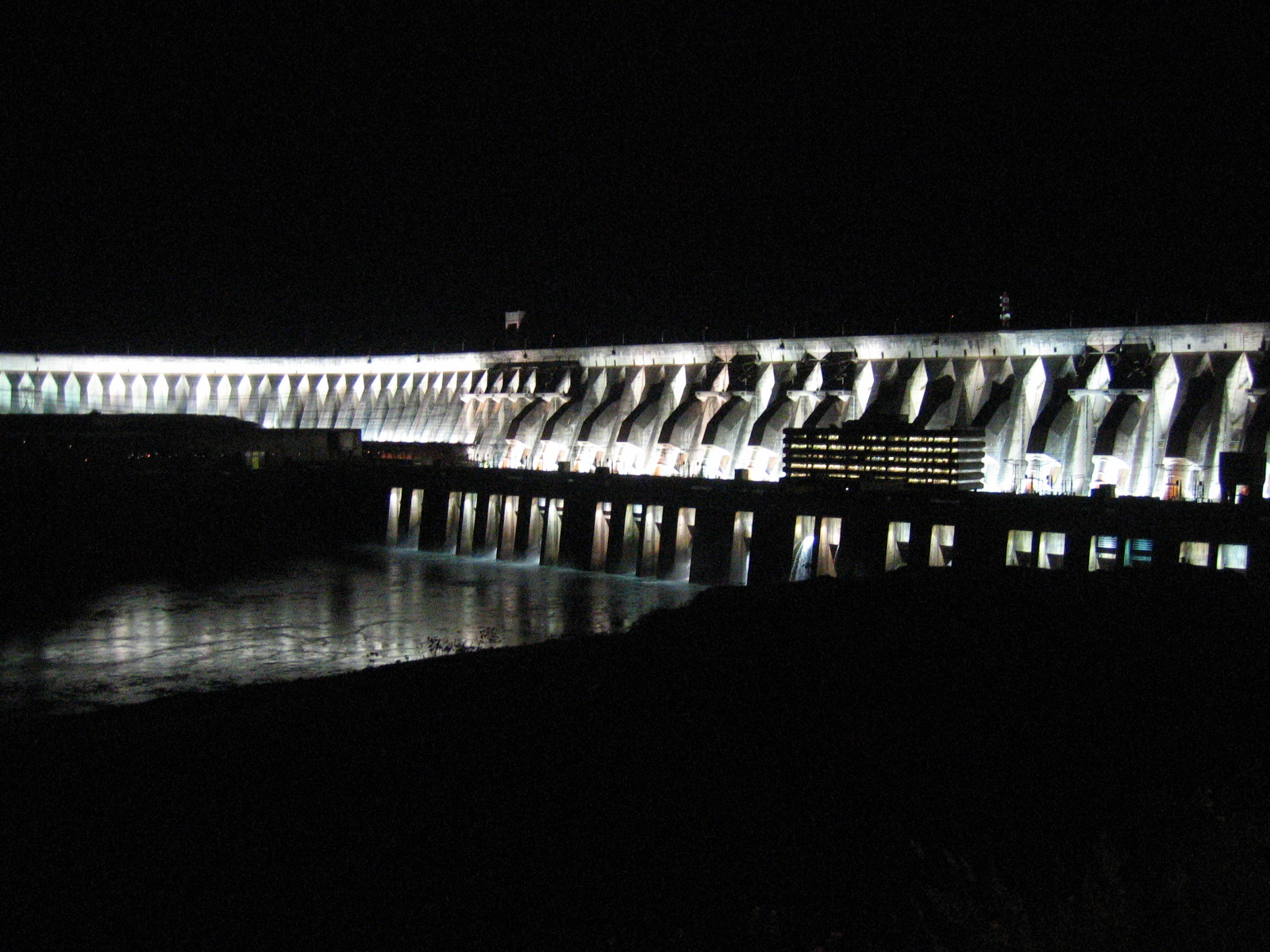
The Itaipu Dam at night - The world's largest hydroelectric plant by energy generation and second-largest by installed capacity

Eletrobras is an electric power holding company. It is the largest generation and transmission company in Brazil. Through its subsidiaries it owns about 40% of Brazil's generation capacities and controls 69% of the National Interconnected System.

Eletrobras stands as the biggest company of the electric power sector in Latin America.

=== Subsidiaries ===
Among Eletrobras' subsidiaries, there are generation and transmission companies.

Eletronorte S.A.
- Type: Private, subsidiary of Eletrobras
- Industry: Power generation
- Founded: 1973; 53 years ago
- Headquarters: Brasília, Brazil
- Products: Electrical power
- Services: Electricity distribution
- Number of employees: 3,655
- Website: www.eln.gov.br

Eletronorte (Centrais Elétricas do Norte do Brasil S.A.) is responsible for the power generation, transmission and distribution in the states of Amazonas, Pará, Acre, Rondônia, Roraima, Amapá, Tocantins and Mato Grosso.

Eletropar S.A.
- Type: Subsidiary
- Industry: Private equity
- Founded: 1995; 31 years ago
- Headquarters: Rio de Janeiro, Brazil
- Revenue: ▲US$ 98.0 Million (2010)
- Net income: ▲US$ 13.6 Million (2010)
- Total assets: ▲US$ 152.4 Million (2011)
- Number of employees: 230
- Website: www.eletrobraspar.com

Eletrobras Eletropar acts in participations of other energy companies.

- Eletronet - 49.27%
- Companhia Energética de São Paulo - 4.77%
- EMAE - Empresa Metropolitana de Águas e Energia - 1.42%
- AES Eletropaulo - 2.03%
- CPFL Energia - 1.15%
- CTEEP - 0.66%
- Energias de Portugal - 3.09%
- Itaipu Binacional - 50.00%

CHESF S.A.
- Type: Subsidiary
- Industry: Utilities
- Founded: 1948; 78 years ago
- Headquarters: Recife, Brazil
- Key people: Fabio Lopes Alves (CEO)
- Products: Electricity generation
- Number of employees: 4,427
- Parent: Eletrobras
- Website: www.chesf.com.br

CHESF (Companhia Hidro-Elétrica do São Francisco; São Francisco's Hydroelectric Company) generates and transmits electric power from hydroelectric plants to all of the cities in northeast of Brazil. It owns 14 hydroelectric energy plants and 1 thermoelectric energy plant. Sinval Zaidan Gama was made CEO in January 2017.

The main source of energy is the São Francisco River.

Eletrobras CGTEE S.A.
- Type: Subsidiary
- Industry: Electricity
- Founded: 26 December 1996
- Defunct: 2 January 2020
- Headquarters: Candiota, Brazil
- Parent: Eletrobras
- Divisions: CGT Eletrosul
- Website: cgteletrosul.com.br

Eletrobras CGTEE was a Brazilian power company created on 11 July 1997. It is active in the state of Rio Grande do Sul.

Eletrobras Cepel

Eletrobras Eletronuclear

Eletrobras Eletrosul

Eletrobras Furnas

Itaipu Binacional

=== International activities ===
Eletrobras was authorized by Act 11.651, sanctioned on 7 April 2008, to operate abroad as an investor in the power sector, by means of consortiums and/or specific purposes companies; it may also have control on enterprises. In order to coordinate this operation, it was created the Superintendence of Operations Abroad, which will operate following the guidelines of its board of directors.

For this first period, the Superintendence of Operations Abroad has set forth the priorities as follows:

1. Interconnect new sources of energy in Latin America with the Brazilian power system;
2. Promote the energetic integration between Brazil and the countries of Latin America; and
3. Prospect opportunities for investment in power energy in other countries to benefit the Brazilian economy by generating new markets for the goods and services suppliers segment.

The Superintendence of Operations Abroad has been developing negotiations with several countries in Latin America and Africa:

- Angola and Namibia – Feasibility Studies of the AHE from Baynes, located in the Cunene River, in the border between the two countries;
- Argentina – AHE Binacional de Garabi;
- Costa Rica – Technical Cooperation Agreement under analysis;
- Nicaragua – Appraisal of AHEs from Boboke and Tumarim;
- Peru – Analysis of feasibility for use of 15 AHEs, totalizing 20,000 MW;
- Uruguay - New transmission lines expanding the already existing electric interconnection between the southern part of Brazil and Uruguay;
- Venezuela – Studies for interconnection with the purpose of having an electric interchange between the two countries.

With Bolivia, Colombia, China, Ecuador, El Salvador, Guinea Bissau, Guyana, Morocco and Nigeria the contacts are in their initial phase.

== List of current and former CEOs ==
| Took office in | CEO | # |
| 1962 | Paulo Richer | 1º |
| 1964 | José Varonil de Albuquerque Lima | 2º |
| 1964 | Octavio Marcondes Ferraz | 3º |
| 1967 | Mario Penna Bhering | 4º |
| 1975 | Antonio Carlos Magalhães | 5º |
| 1978 | Arnaldo Rodrigues Barbalho | 6º |
| 1979 | Maurício Schulman | 7º |
| 1980 | José Costa Cavalcanti | 8º |
| 1985 | Mario Penna Bhering | 9º |
| 1990 | José Maria Siqueira de Barros | 10º |
| 1992 | Eliseu Resende | 11º |
| 1993 | José Luis Alquéres | 12º |
| 1995 | Mario Fernando de Melo Santos | 13º |
| 1995 | Antônio José Imbassahy da Silva | 14º |
| 1996 | Firmino Ferreira Sampaio Neto | 15º |
| 2001 | Cláudio Ávila da Silva | 16º |
| 2002 | Altino Ventura Filho | 17º |
| 2003 | Luiz Pinguelli Rosa | 18º |
| 2004 | Silas Rondeau Cavalcanti Silva | 19º |
| 2005 | Aloísio Marcos Vasconcelos Novais | 20º |
| 2006 | Valter Luiz Cardeal de Souza | 21º |
| 2008 | José Antonio Muniz Lopes | 22º |
| 2010 | José da Costa Carvalho Neto | 23º |
| 2016 | Wilson Ferreira Júnior | 24º |
| 2020 | Rodrigo Limp | 25º |
| 2022 | Wilson Ferreira Júnior | 26º |

== Privatization in 2022 ==
In May 2021, the Câmara dos Deputados approved a Provisional Measure (MP), sent by the Bolsonaro Government, that foresees the privatization of Eletrobras. The process would take place through the sale of new ordinary shares on the B3 Stock Exchange, which in practice would decrease the shareholding interest of the government and the Brazilian Development Bank (BNDES) to about 45%, with more papers offered to private investors. Where each shareholder, individually, could not hold more than 10% of the voting capital of the company. The Government would maintain a special class of share (golden share) that grants it veto power in decisions of the shareholders' meeting. The MP was approved in the Senate Plenary, on 17 June 2021, with the presentation of three different opinions by the rapporteur, Senator Marcos Rogério (DEM-RO). The dispute was reflected in the result of the vote: the MP received 42 votes in favor and 37 against.

Privatization advocates argue that once privatized the company would increase its investment capacity. However it was criticized by other sectors of society, such as the Union Movement for Energy, Instituto de Energia e Meio Ambiente (IEMA), and the Federação das Indústrias do Estado de São Paulo (FIESP), fearing that the project could lead to increased tariffs for consumers and cause environmental damage. The main concerns about the privatization were amendments requiring the contracting of thermoelectric plants powered by natural gas and the authorization to build the Tucuruí transmission line without the need for environmental permits from the Instituto Brasileiro do Meio Ambiente e dos Recursos Naturais Renováveis (IBAMA) and the Fundação Nacional do Índio (FUNAI).

The final version of the project was approved on 21 June 2021. The final proposal extends contracts of the PROINFA for 20 years, provides for the construction of SHPs, and forbids, for ten years, that subsidiaries of Eletrobras are extinguished. The MP also determines revitalization projects in the Bacia do rio São Francisco, the Furnas reservoirs, in the Amazonia, Madeira River and Tocantins River. Also, Eletronuclear, responsible for the Usina Nuclear de Angra, and the Brazilian participation in the Itaipu Dam will be dismembered from Eletrobras and kept under state control.

In July 2021, Bolsonaro sanctioned the Provisional Measure for the privatization of Eletrobras. According to government accounts the privatization would reduce the electricity bill by about 7.36%. On the other hand, entities in the sector said that the electricity bill will become more expensive with the privatization.

The focus of the privatization is to sell shares until the government ceases to own 60% of the shares and owns 45% of the company, thus losing the majority stake in the company.

In September 2021, the Empresa Brasileira de Participações em Energia Nuclear e Binacional (ENBPar) was created, with the objective of taking over Eletrobras activities that cannot be privatized, such as the Itaipu Binacional and Eletronuclear companies (Angra 1, 2 and 3 plants) and the management of public policies, under law 14.182/2021.

On 14 June 2022, 802.1 million shares were sold, with a base price of R$42 (US$8.56), in an operation that moved R$33.7 billion (US$6.9 billion). With this, the Union's stake in the voting capital of the state company was reduced from 68.6% to 40.3%.

Major shareholders include GIC Private Limited, the Canada Pension Plan Investment Board (CPPIB), and the Brazilian manager 3G Radar, linked to 3G Capital.

Employees and retirees of Eletrobras and its subsidiaries had priority to acquire up to 10% of the total shares offered. It was also authorized that workers could buy company shares using up to 50% of the balance of the FGTS.
