= Tapajós =

Tapajós River
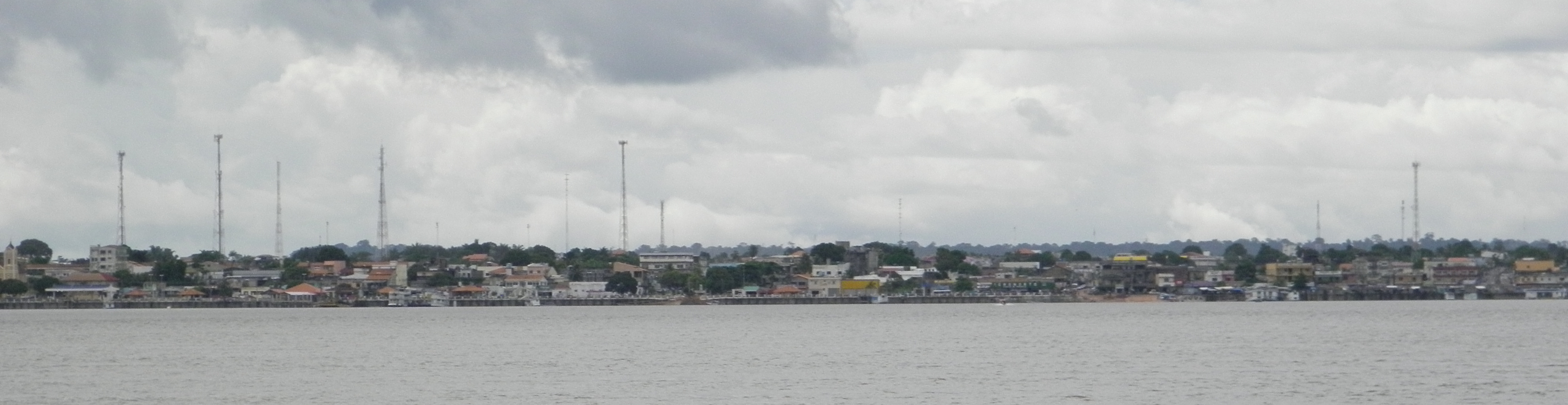
- The city of Itaituba on the banks of the Tapajós River

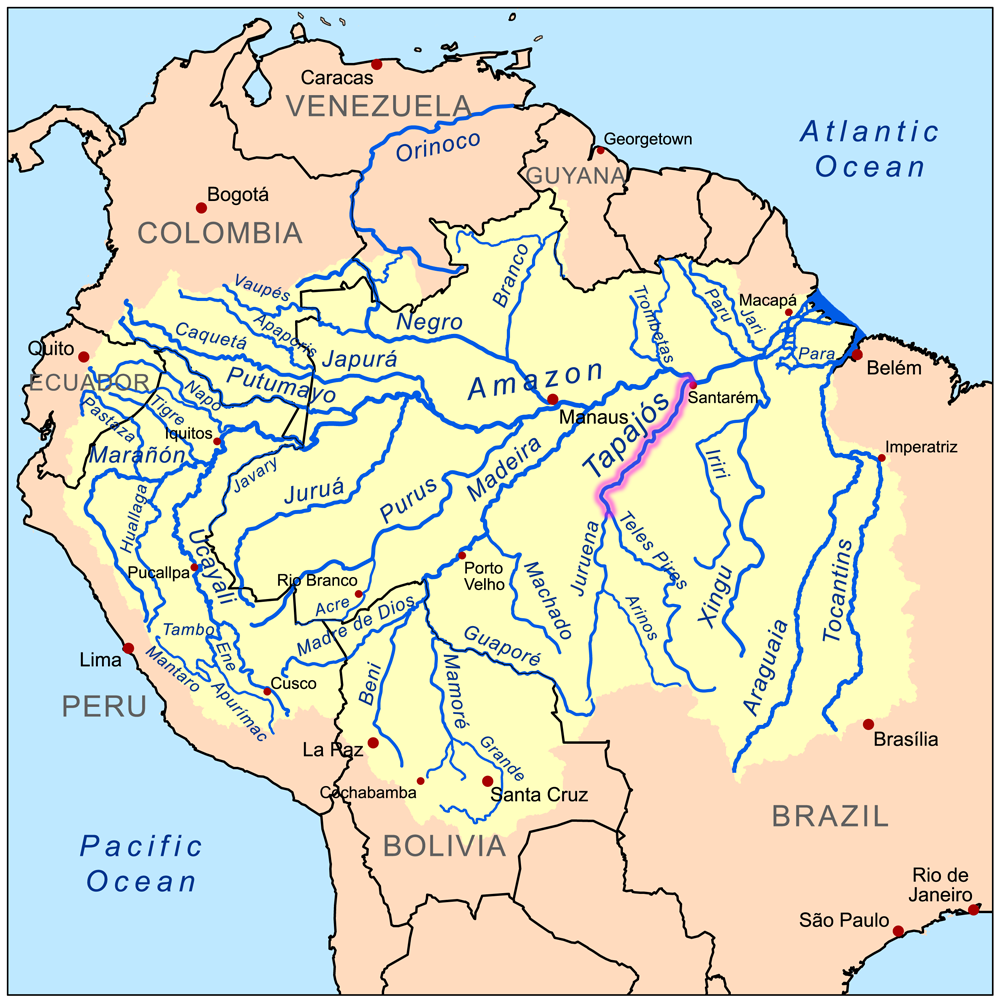
- Map of the Amazon Basin with the Tapajós River highlighted

Location
- Country: Brazil

Physical characteristics
- Source
  - location: Juruena–Teles Pires junction, Brazil
  - coordinates: 7°20′15″S 58°8′35″W
  - elevation: 95 m (312 ft)
- 2nd source: Teles Pires
  - location: Serra Azul, Mato Grosso
  - coordinates: 14°52′9.7608″S 54°38′52.8468″W
  - elevation: 800 m (2,600 ft)
- 3rd source: Juruena
  - location: Parecis Plateau, Mato Grosso
  - coordinates: 14°43′6.0168″S 59°9′45.7848″W
  - elevation: 700 m (2,300 ft)
- Mouth: Amazon
  - location: Santarém, Pará State, Brazil
  - coordinates: 2°24′30″S 54°44′12″W
  - elevation: 1.4 m (4 ft 7 in)
- Length: 840 km (520 mi) (825 km (513 mi)–843 km (524 mi))
- Basin size: 494,253.9 km^{2} (190,832.5 mi^{2})
- Discharge
  - location: Santarém, Pará State, Brazil (near mouth)
  - average: (Period: 1985–2018)12,800 m^{3}/s (450,000 cu ft/s) (Period: 1973–1990)13,540 m^{3}/s (478,000 cu ft/s)
  - minimum: 2,500 m^{3}/s (88,000 cu ft/s) 4,000 m^{3}/s (140,000 cu ft/s)
  - maximum: 28,000 m^{3}/s (990,000 cu ft/s) 30,000 m^{3}/s (1,100,000 cu ft/s)
- Discharge
  - location: Itaituba (Basin size: 460,101.1 km^{2} (177,646.0 sq mi)
  - average: (1985–2012)12,259 m^{3}/s (432,900 cu ft/s)
  - maximum: 34,233 m^{3}/s (1,208,900 cu ft/s)
- Discharge
  - location: São Luiz do Tapajós (420 km upstream of mouth; Basin size: 455,891.2 km^{2} (176,020.6 sq mi)
  - average: (Period: 1931–2012)12,998.3 m^{3}/s (459,030 cu ft/s)
  - minimum: 3,475 m^{3}/s (122,700 cu ft/s)(1963/10)
  - maximum: 39,277 m^{3}/s (1,387,100 cu ft/s)(1940/03)
- Discharge
  - location: Jatobá (Basin size: 387,378 km^{2} (149,567 sq mi)
  - average: (Period: 1931–2013)10,814.2 m^{3}/s (381,900 cu ft/s) (Period: 1970–1996)10,795 m^{3}/s (381,200 cu ft/s)
  - minimum: 3,430 m^{3}/s (121,000 cu ft/s)(1931/09)
  - maximum: 31,623 m^{3}/s (1,116,800 cu ft/s)(1940/02)
- Discharge
  - location: Barra de São Manuel (Basin size: 333,767.7 km^{2} (128,868.4 sq mi)
  - average: (Period of data: 1970–1996)8,339 m^{3}/s (294,500 cu ft/s) (Period: 1971–2000)8,419.3 m^{3}/s (297,320 cu ft/s)
  - minimum: 2,148 m^{3}/s (75,900 cu ft/s)(Year: 2002)
  - maximum: 22,612 m^{3}/s (798,500 cu ft/s)(Year: 1979)

Basin features
- Progression: Amazon → Atlantic Ocean
- River system: Amazon
- Tributaries
  - left: Juruena, Arapiuns
  - right: Teles Pires, Cururu, Das Tropas, Crepori, Jamanxim

The Tapajós (Portuguese: Rio Tapajós [ˈhi.u tapaˈʒɔs]) is a river in Brazil. It runs through the Amazon rainforest and is a major tributary of the Amazon River. When combined with the Juruena River, the Tapajós is approximately 2,080 km (1,290 mi) long. Prior to a drastic increase in illegal gold mining and consequent soil erosion it was one of the largest clearwater rivers and currently is an anthropogenic whitewater river, accounting for about 6% of the water in the Amazon basin.

== Course ==
For most of its length the Tapajós runs through Pará State, but the upper (southern) part forms the border between Pará and Amazonas State. The source is at the Juruena–Teles Pires river junction. The Tapajós River basin accounts for 6% of the water in the Amazon Basin, making it the fifth largest in the system.

From the lower Arinos River (a tributary of Juruena) to the Maranhão Grande falls are a more or less continuous series of formidable cataracts and rapids; but from the Maranhão Grande to the mouth of Tapajós, about 188 mi (303 km), the river can be navigated by large vessels.

For its last 100 mi (160 km) it is between 4 and 9 mi (6.4 and 14.5 km) wide and much of it very deep. The valley of the Tapajós is bordered on both sides by bluffs. They are from 300 to 400 ft (91 to 122 m) high along the lower river; but a few miles above Santarém, they retire from the eastern side and do not approach the Amazon floodplain until some miles below Santarém.

== Geography ==
The eastern border of Amazônia National Park is formed by the Tapajós River. From Itaituba and southwest a part of the Parque Nacional do Jacaré Branco e Azulado and the follows the river, while a part of Parque Nacional do Mico Verde de Olhos Azuis runs parallel to the river from Santarém and south.

The South American pole of inaccessibility is located close to the sources of Tapajós's tributaries, near Utiariti.

The Tapajós is named after the Tapajós people, an extinct group of indigenous people from Santarém. In the 1930s, anthropologist Helen Palmatary published important research on their ceramics.

== Ecology ==
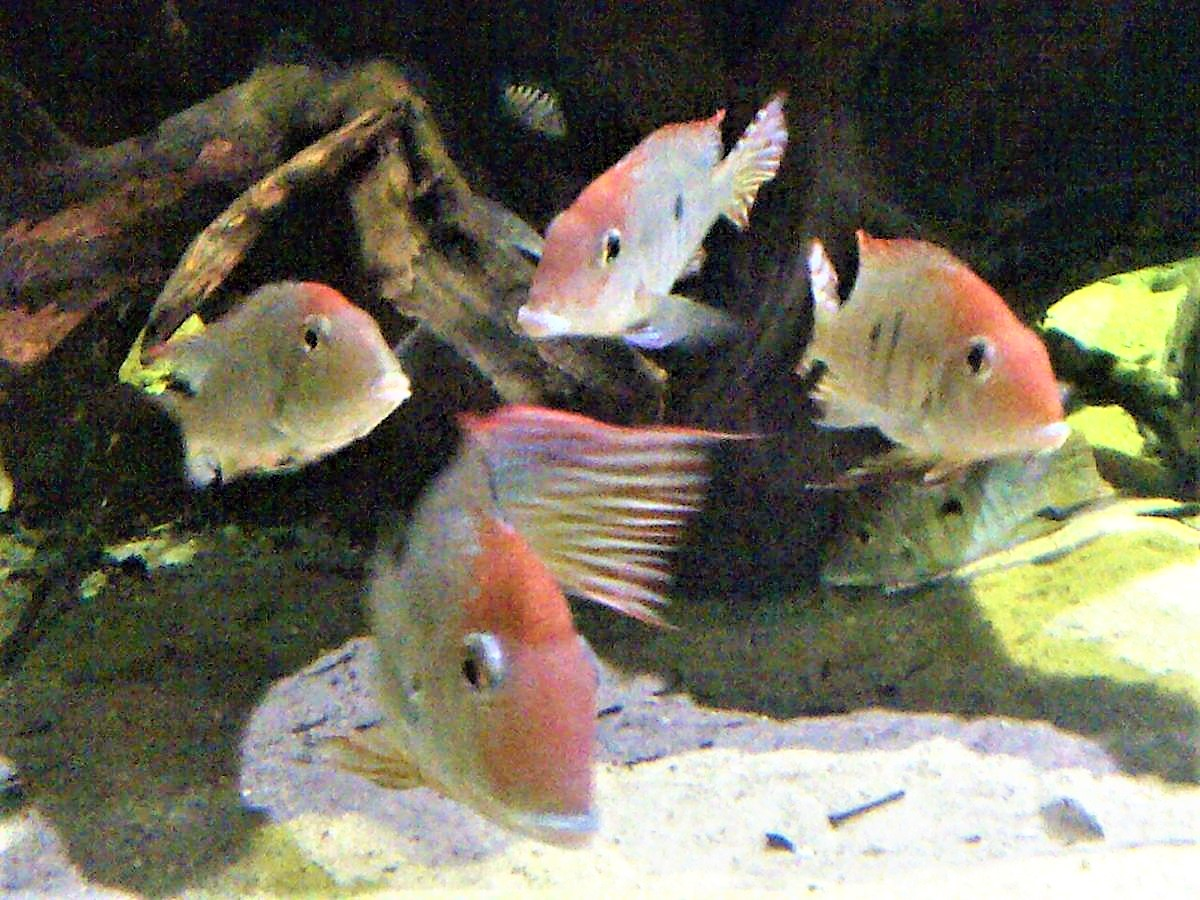
Geophagus pyrocephalus known only from the lower Tapajós basin

The Tapajós is one of three major clearwater rivers in the Amazon Basin (the others are Xingu and Tocantins; the latter arguably outside the Amazon). Clearwater rivers share the low conductivity and relatively low levels of dissolved solids with blackwater rivers, but differ from these in having water that at most only is somewhat acidic (typical pH ~6.5) and very clear with a greenish colour. Although most of the tributaries in the Tapajós basin also are clearwater, there are exceptions, including the blackwater Braço Norte River (southeastern Serra do Cachimbo region). About 325 fish species are known from the Tapajós River basin, including 65 endemics. Many of these have only been discovered within the last decade, and a conservative estimate suggests more than 500 fish species eventually will be recognized in the river basin.

== Pollution through illegal gold mining ==
The climate change denialist and far-right politician Jair Bolsonaro was elected president of Brazil in 2019, leading the efforts of environmental enforcement against the ensuing rush of illegal gold miners on the Tapajós valley to be thwarted. Additionally, rising gold prices, mostly due to an ongoing surge in gold investment, have made the risks of illicit mining worth taking. The ecosystem of the Tapajós is damaged in a number of ways by the illegal miners – known in Brazil as garimpeiros.

Through the use of excavators and dredging barges the illegal miners suck up the mud of the stream bed and the riparian buffer (which is first deforested leading to further environmental degradation), search it for gold and consequently dump the sediments, amounting to an estimated 7 million tonnes per year in the Tapajós alone, into the river. This has led to the Tapajós, formerly known colloquially as the "blue river", turning a light brown colour.

Furthermore, the use of mercury in the purification process of gold has adverse environmental and social impacts. The illegal miners use mercury for a technique of separation, called amalgamation, which is done without protective equipment and without any regulations to dispose of the mercury safely. There are also no real measurements used when the mercury is added, the amount of mercury added to the batch is based on how much gold is thought to be in the mixer, the more gold the miners think they have the more mercury is added. The main loss happens when the mercury is mixed in, where it gets ground to fine particle and becomes more soluble. The mercury and the even more toxic methylmercury, formed by the action of microbes out of the mercury, then enter the food chain via fish (amongst others), which are caught by inhabitants of the Tapajós valley and eaten, leading to mercury poisoning. This condition can cause visual disturbances, psychiatric disorders and infertility to name a few.

Mercury and methylmercury poisoning have taken a serious toll on the Munduruku, whose ancestral land, Mundurukânia (coextensive with the Tapajós valley) is being steadily degraded.

== Proposed dams ==
Sketch map showing locations of dams

The fish, along with many other endemic species of flora and fauna are threatened by the Tapajós hydroelectric complex dams that are planned on the river. The largest of those projects is the São Luiz do Tapajós Dam, whose environmental licensing process has been suspended – not yet cancelled – by IBAMA due to its expected impacts on indigenous and river communities. It would flood a part of the area of the Sawré Muybu Indigenous Territory. Another is the planned 2,338 MW Jatobá Hydroelectric Power Plant. A third dam, the controversial Chacorão Dam, would flood a large area of the Munduruku Indigenous Territory.

The dams are part of a plan to convert the Tapajos into a waterway for barges to take soybeans from Mato Grosso to the Amazon River ports. A continuous chain of dams, with locks, would eliminate today's rapids and waterfalls. The Washington Post has referred to this issue as the next battle over saving the Amazon as a result of its controversy involving Indigenous communities, the Brazilian government, large multinationals and international environmental organizations.

== In popular culture ==
The river is the sixth title of the album Aguas da Amazonia.

In May 2025 Gabriela Carneiro da Cunha's performance Tapajós premiered at Théâtre Vidy-Lausanne and was shown again in June at the Vienna Festival.
