= Jamanxim River =

River in Brazil

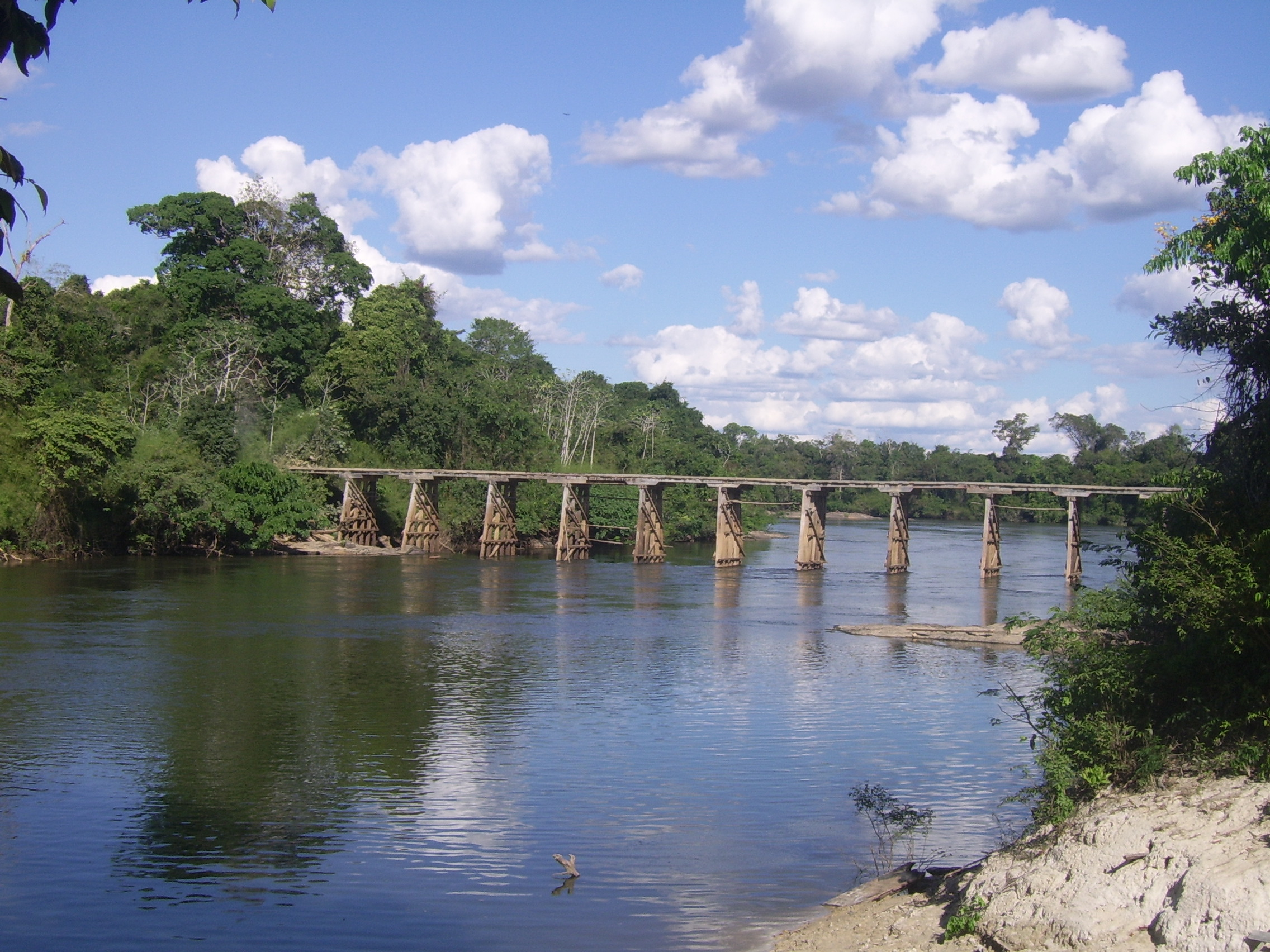
- Bridge over the Jamaxim

- Mouth location in Brazil
- Native name: Rio Jamanxim (Portuguese)

Location
- Country: Brazil

Physical characteristics
- Source
  - location: Serra do Cachimbo, Pará
  - elevation: 460 m (1,510 ft)
- Mouth
  - coordinates: 4°45′23″S 56°26′15″W
  - elevation: 40 m (130 ft)
- Length: 510 km (320 mi)
- Basin size: 58,771 km^{2} (22,692 mi^{2})
- Discharge
  - location: Near mouth
  - average: (Period: 1971–2000)2,217.9 m^{3}/s (78,320 cu ft/s)

Basin features
- Progression: Tapajós → Amazon → Atlantic Ocean
- River system: Tapajós

The Jamanxim River is a river of Pará state in north-central Brazil. Originating in the Serra do Cachimbo, it is a tributary of the Tapajós, into which it flows a few kilometers upstream from Itaituba.

== Course ==
The river flows through the Tapajós-Xingu moist forests ecoregion. It flows through the Itaituba I National Forest, a 220,639 hectares (545,210 acres) sustainable use conservation area established in 1998. The river basin also contains part of the 538,151 hectares (1,329,800 acres) Rio Novo National Park, a conservation unit created in 2006.

== Hydroelectric potential ==
Its hydroelectric potential, along with that of the Tapajós, was assessed by Eletronorte (Centrais Elétricas do Norte do Brasil S.A.), the regional power authority, identifying nine potential dam sites, including four along the Jamanxim. at Cachoeira dos Patos, (estimated at 528 MW); Cachoeira do Caí, (estimated at 802 MW); at Jardim do Ouro and at Jamanxim (estimated at 881 MW). If all were constructed, these dams would flood a total of 103,700 ha, including 33,216 ha of the Jamanxim National Park and 25,849 ha of the Jamanxim, Itaituba I, Itaituba II and Altamira national forests.

== See also ==
- List of rivers of Pará

== Sources ==
- Sears, Robin, Amazon Basin - Brazil (NT0168), WWF: World Wildlife Fund
- Unidade de Conservação: Floresta Nacional de Itaituba I (in Portuguese), MMA: Ministério do Meio Ambiente
- Unidade de Conservação: Parque Nacional do Rio Novo (in Portuguese), MMA: Ministério do Meio Ambiente, archived from the original on May 15, 2021
- Ziesler, R.; Ardizzone, G.D. (1979), "Amazon River System", The Inland waters of Latin America, Food and Agriculture Organization of the United Nations, ISBN 92-5-000780-9, archived from the original on 21 October 2013
- Philip Fearnside (2022). "Barragens no rio Jamanxim ameaçam o meio ambiente e os povos indígenas: 1 - As barragens planejadasl". Amazônia Real (in Brazilian Portuguese). Wikidata Q112108301.
- Philip Fearnside (2022). "Barragens no rio Jamanxim ameaçam o meio ambiente e os povos indígenas: 2 – Impactos das represas planejadas". Amazônia Real (in Brazilian Portuguese). Wikidata Q112108261.
