= Carajás (proposed Brazilian state) =

Proposed new Brazilian state

The proposed flag for the State of Carajas

Carajás

Carajás (Portuguese pronunciation: [kaɾaˈʒas]) was the name for a proposed new Brazilian state, which would consist of the southeast part of the current state of Pará. Along with a simultaneous proposal to create another state called Tapajós from another part of Pará, the proposal was defeated in a referendum in 2011 and by law could not be revived until 2015; as of 2018, no new such proposal has been made. Although voters within the territory of the proposed new states voted strongly in favor, the vote was strongly negative among the much larger population in what would have remained of Pará.

== Municipalities ==
The new state's largest city and proposed capital would be Marabá. Carajás would have a population of about 1.6 million and an area of 289,799 square kilometres (111,892 sq mi), comprising 39 out of Pará's 144 municipalities. As of 2011, its GDP of BRL 19.5 billion constituted 33% of the total GDP of Pará.

The two most populous municipalities would be Marabá (population 233,462) and Parauapebas (population 153,942).

=== List of municipalities in the proposed state ===
Name	ImmGR (Note: Immediate Geographic Region (succeeding unit to the Microregion of Brazil))	IntGR (Note: Intermediate Geographic Region (succeeding unit to the Mesoregion of Brazil))
Abel Figueiredo	Marabá	Marabá
Água Azul do Norte	Xinguara	Redenção
Anapu	Altamira	Altamira
Bannach	Redenção	Redenção
Bom Jesus do Tocantins	Marabá	Marabá
Brejo Grande do Araguaia	Marabá	Marabá
Breu Branco	Tucuruí	Marabá
Canaã dos Carajás	Parauapebas	Marabá
Conceição do Araguaia	Redenção	Redenção
Cumaru do Norte	Redenção	Redenção
Curionópolis	Parauapebas	Marabá
Dom Eliseu	Paragominas	Castanhal
Eldorado dos Carajás	Parauapebas	Marabá
Floresta do Araguaia	Redenção	Redenção
Goianésia do Pará	Tucuruí	Marabá
Itupiranga	Marabá	Marabá
Jacundá	Marabá	Marabá
Marabá	Marabá	Marabá
Nova Ipixuna	Marabá	Marabá
Novo Repartimento	Tucuruí	Marabá
Ourilândia do Norte	Tucumã-São Félix do Xingu	Redenção
Pacajá	Tucuruí	Marabá
Palestina do Pará	Marabá	Marabá
Parauapebas	Parauapebas	Marabá
Pau d'Arco	Redenção	Redenção
Piçarra	Marabá	Marabá
Redenção	Redenção	Redenção
Rio Maria	Xinguara	Redenção
Rondon do Pará	Marabá	Marabá
São Domingos do Araguaia	Marabá	Marabá
São Félix do Xingu	Tucumã-São Félix do Xingu	Redenção
São Geraldo do Araguaia	Marabá	Marabá
São João do Araguaia	Marabá	Marabá
Santa Maria das Barreiras	Redenção	Redenção
Santana do Araguaia	Redenção	Redenção
Sapucaia	Xinguara	Redenção
Tucumã	Tucumã-São Félix do Xingu	Redenção
Tucuruí	Tucuruí	Marabá
Xinguara	Xinguara	Redenção

== 2011 referendum ==
In a referendum held on December 11, 2011, the residents of the entire state of Pará were asked to vote on proposals to split the state into three new states: Carajás in the southeast, Tapajós in the west, and a rump Pará in the northeast. Voting was highly polarized regionally, with voters in the territories of the proposed new states voting strongly in favor, while voters in the rump Pará voted strongly against. In particular, more than 90% of voters in Marabá voted in favor, while more than 90% of voters in Pará's capital city of Belém voted against. As Belém and its surrounding area comprise over half the population of the original state, the proposal had no chance of passing.

== See also ==
- Tapajós - the other proposed state to be carved out of Pará, with the proposal also defeated in the December 2011 referendum
