= List of TV Brasil affiliates =

TV Brasil is a publicly owned Brazilian television network made up of four owned-and-operated stations and over 84 affiliates. This is a list of TV Brasil's affiliates and broadcast relay stations, arranged alphabetically by state. Stations listed in bold are owned and operated by TV Brasil.

== Affiliates ==
=== Acre ===
- Rio Branco - TV Nova Aldeia (Channel 2 (30))

=== Alagoas ===
- Maceió - TV UFAL (Channel 8.1)
- Maceió - TVE Alagoas (Channel 14)
- Palmeira dos Índios/Maceió - TV Alagoas (Channel 18)

=== Amapá ===
- Macapá - TV UNIFAP (Channel 1.1)

=== Amazonas ===
- Manaus - TV Encontro das Águas (Channel 2.1)

=== Bahia ===
- Salvador - TVE Bahia (Channel 10.1)
- Feira de Santana - TV Feira (Channel 2.1)
- Vitória da Conquista - TV UESB (Channel 4.1)

=== Ceará ===
- Fortaleza - TV Ceará (Channel 5.1)

=== Distrito Federal ===
- Brasília - **TV Brasil Capital** (Channel 2.1)

=== Espírito Santo ===
- Colatina/Linhares/São Matheus- TV Foz (Channel 7,16,12 VHF)
- Guarapari - TV Guarapari (Channel 9.1)

=== Goiás ===
- Caldas Novas - TV Caldas (34.1)
- Goiânia - TV UFG (Channel 14.1)
- Jataí - TV Sudoeste (11)
- Santa Helena de Goiás - TV Rios (14)
- Bom Jesus de Goiás - TV Bom (36)

=== Maranhão ===
- São Luís - **TV Brasil Maranhão** (Channel 2.1)

=== Mato Grosso ===
- Cuiabá - TV Universidade (Channel 2.1)

=== Mato Grosso do Sul ===
- Campo Grande - TVE MS (Channel 4.1)

=== Minas Gerais ===
- Belo Horizonte - Rede Minas (Channel 9.1 and 9.2 (simulcast SD))
- Andradas - TV Andradas (Channel 36 UHF)
- Poços de Caldas - TV Plan (Channel 47 UHF)
- Barroso - TV Diversa (VHF Channel 46)
- Frutal - Guia TV Brazil (Channel 3 (36) Digital)
- Muzambinho - TV Muzambinho (Channel 12 (15) Digital)

=== Pará ===
- Belém - TV Cultura do Pará (Channel 2.1)
- Santarém - TV Norte Santarém (Channel 52 (41))

=== Paraíba ===
- João Pessoa - **TV Universitária** (Channel 43.1)

=== Paraná ===
- Curitiba - UFPR TV (Channel 15)
- Francisco Beltrão - TV Beltrão (Channel 53 (48) VHF)
- Guarapuava/Ivaiporã - Rede Humaitá (Channel 13 VHF)
- Apucarana - Canal 38 (Channel 38 (48) VHF)
- Cianorte - TV Cinturão Verde (Channel 17 (14) VHF)

=== Pernambuco ===
- Recife - TV Universitária (Channel 11.1)
- Caruaru - TV Pernambuco (Channel 12 VHF)

=== Piauí ===
- Parnaíba - TV Delta (Channel 2 VHF)
- Picos - TV Picos (Channel 13 VHF)
- Teresina - TV Antares (Channel 2.1)

=== Rio de Janeiro ===
- Rio de Janeiro - **TV Brasil Rio de Janeiro** (Channel 2.1)
- Teresópolis - TV Serrana (Channel 14)

=== Rio Grande do Norte ===
- Natal - TV Universitária (Channel 5.1)
- Mossoró - TV Câmara (Channel 2 (20))

=== Rio Grande do Sul ===
- Porto Alegre - TVE RS (Channel 30 Digital)
- Caxias do Sul - UCS TV (Channel 27 UHF)
- Santa Cruz do Sul - TV Gazeta (Channel 18 UHF
- Santana do Livramento - TV Cidade 10 (The channel is only available on the website)
- Pelotas - TV UFPEL (Channel 1 (11)

=== Rondônia ===
- Porto Velho - TV UNIR (Channel 35 UHF)

=== Roraima ===
- Boa Vista - TV Universitária (Channel 2.1)

=== São Paulo ===
- Americana - TV Todo Dia (Channel 46 UHF)
- Andradina - SRC TV (Channel 17 (50) UHF).
- Araraquara - TV Morada do Sol (Channel 8 (20) UHF)
- Barretos - TV Barretos (Channel 31 UHF)
- Birigui - TV Noroeste (Channel 19 UHF)
- Cruzeiro - TV Cruzeiro (Channel 32 UHF)
- Ibitinga - TV Cidade (Channel 42 UHF)
- Jundiaí - Rede Paulista (Channel 14 UHF)
- Matão - TV Matão (Channel 58 UHF)
- Piracicaba - TV Beira Rio (Channel 32 UHF)
- Ribeirão Preto - TV Thathi (Channel 33 UHF)
- Santos - TV UniSantos (Channel 40 UHF)
- São Bernardo do Campo - TV dos Trabalhadores (Canal 46 UHF)
- São Carlos - TVE São Carlos (Channel 48 UHF)
- São Paulo - **TV Brasil São Paulo** (Channel 68 UHF)
- São Vicente - Santa Cecília TV (Channel 52 UHF)
- Sertãozinho - STZ TV (Channel 59 UHF)
- Sorocaba - TV Metropolitana (Channel 39 UHF)
- Votuporanga - TV UNIFEV (Channel 55 UHF)

=== Santa Catarina ===
- Florianópolis - TV USFC (Channel 63 Digital)
- Araranguá - TV Sul Catarinense (Channel 5 VHF)
- Joinville - TV Brasil Esperança (Channel 11 VHF)
- Itajaí - TV Brasil Esperança (Channel 21 (22) VHF)
- Criciúma - RTV (Channel 19 UHF)
- Rio do Sul - Rede Bela Aliança (Channel 7 (22) UHF)

=== Sergipe ===
- Aracaju - TV UFS (Channel 2.1)

=== Tocantins ===
- Palmas - UFT TV (Channel 2.1)

== Broadcast relay stations ==
=== Alagoas ===
- São Sebastião - Channel 2.1

=== Amapá ===
- Calçoene - Channel 2

=== Amazonas ===
- Tefé - Channel 12 VHF

=== Goiás ===
- Goianésia - Channel 13 VHF
- Cachoeira de Goiás - Channel 2
- Doverlândia - Channel 2

=== Maranhão ===
- Arari - Channel 13
- Cajari - Channel 42
- Magalhães de Almeida - Channel 2
- Mata Roma - Channel 2
- Palmeirândia - Channel 2
- São João do Carú - Channel 2
- Penalva - Channel 48
- Pio XII - Channel 5
- Santa Inês - Channel 3
- Viana - Channel 36

=== Mato Grosso ===
- Alta Floresta - Channel 10 VHF
- Alto Araguaia - Channel 2

=== Pará ===
- Abaetetuba - Channel 11 VHF
- Acará - Channel 9 VHF
- Baião - Channel 8 VHF
- Bragança - Channel 11 VHF
- Brasil Novo - Channel 5 VHF
- Breves - Channel 10 VHF
- Cametá - Channel 3 VHF
- Capanema - Channel 9 VHF
- Castanhal - Channel 8 VHF
- Conceição do Araguaia - Channel 5 VHF
- Curionópolis - Channel 3 VHF
- Curuçá - Channel 5 VHF
- Floresta do Araguaia - Channel 3 VHF
- Igarapé-Açu - Channel 12 VHF
- Igarapé-Miri - Channel 9 VHF
- Ipixuna do Pará - Channel 9 VHF
- Irituia - Channel 3 VHF
- Mãe do Rio - Channel 2
- Marapanim - Channel 11 VHF
- Medicilândia - Channel 7 VHF
- Melgaço - Channel 11 VHF
- Monte Alegre - Channel 13 VHF
- Óbidos - Channel 5 VHF
- Oriximiná - Channel 11 VHF
- Ourém - Channel 12 VHF
- Portel - Channel 13 VHF
- Rondon do Pará - Channel 12 VHF
- Salinópolis - Channel 8 VHF
- Santa Cruz do Arari - Channel 9 VHF
- Santa Luzia do Pará - Channel 13 VHF
- Santa Maria do Pará - Channel 5 VHF
- São Félix do Xingu - Channel 9 VHF
- São Miguel do Guamá - Channel 10 VHF
- Senador José Porfírio - Channel 11 VHF
- Soure - Channel 9 VHF
- Terra Santa - Channel 3 VHF
- Tomé-Açu - Channel 12 VHF
- Vigia - Channel 12

=== Paraíba ===
- Campina Grande - Channel 43(in implementation)
- Monte Horebe - Channel 2

=== Pernambuco ===
- Fernando de Noronha - Channel 7
- Itaíba - Channel 2
- Cumaru - Channel 2
- Manari - Channel 2

=== Rio Grande do Sul ===
- São Valentim - Channel 2
- Santo Antônio das Missões - Channel 2

=== Santa Catarina ===
- Lages - Channel 5
- Iporã do Oeste - Channel 2
- Lebon Régis - Channel 2

=== Sergipe ===
- Umbaúba - Channel 2

== Via Satellite ==
- Satellite Star One C2 Analog
  - Frequency: 1400 MHz
  - Polarization: Horizontal
  - BW filter: 18 MHz
- Satélite Star One C2 Digital
  - Frequency: 3631 MHz
  - Symbol Rate: 4687 kbit/s
  - Polarization: Horizontal
  - Video: 308
  - Audio: 256
  - PCR: 8190
