= Tapajós (proposed Brazilian state) =

Proposed new Brazilian state

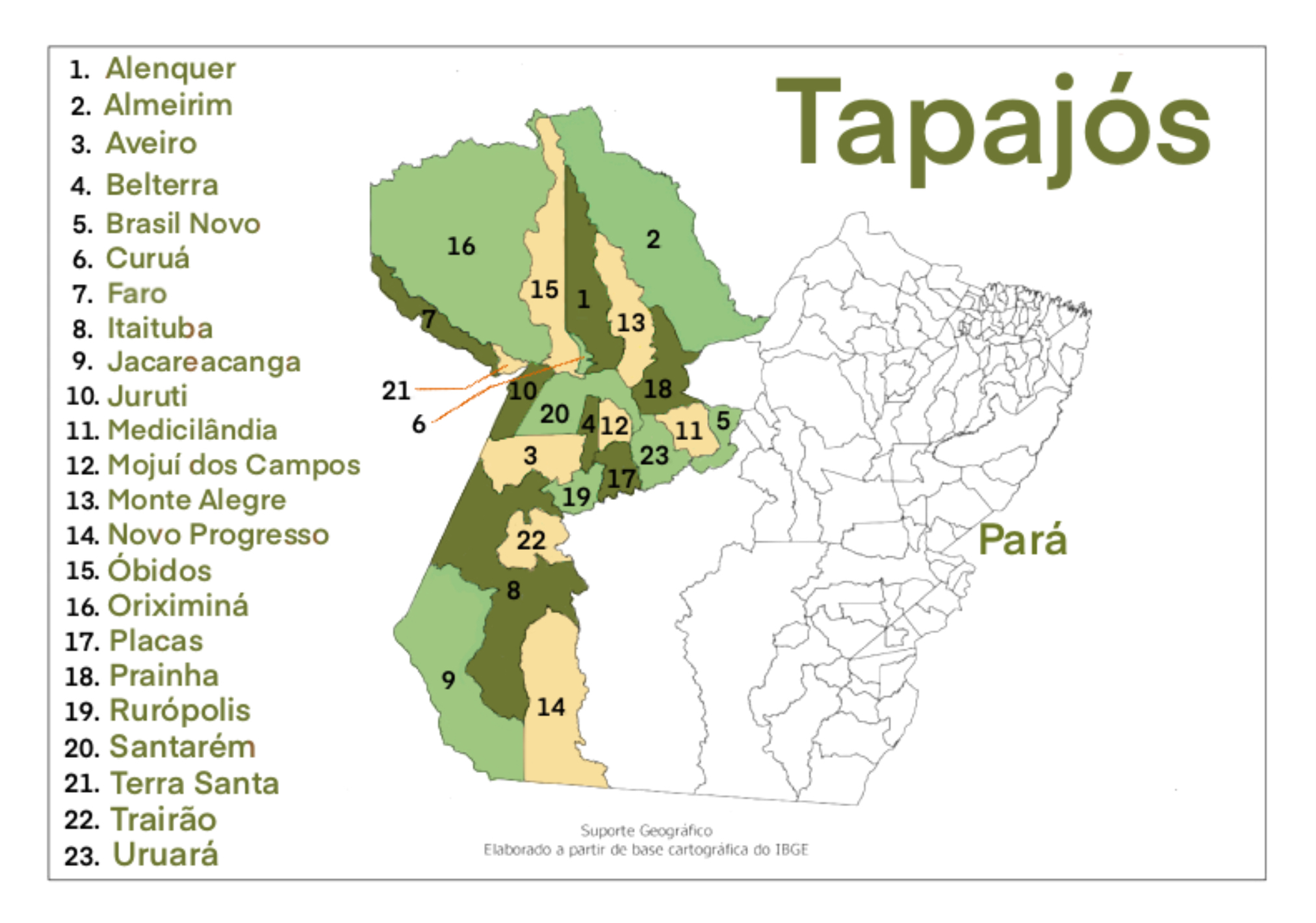
Map showing the names of the municipalities proposed for incorporation into the state of Tapajós.

Tapajós

Tapajós (Portuguese pronunciation: [tapaˈʒɔs]) is a proposed new Brazilian state, which would consist of the western part of the current state of Pará. Along with a simultaneous proposal to create another state called Carajás from another part of Pará, the proposal was defeated in a referendum in 2011 and by law could not be revived until 2015; as of 2019, no new such proposal has been made. Although voters within the territory of the proposed new states voted strongly in favor, the vote was strongly negative among the much larger population in what would have remained of Pará.

== Geography ==
=== Protected areas ===
- Tapajós Environmental Protection Area
- Altamira National Forest
- Mulata National Forest
- Grão-Pará Ecological Station
- Trombetas State Forest
- Maicuru Biological Reserve
- Jari Ecological Station
- Jamanxim National Park
- Terra do Meio Ecological Station
- Nascentes da Serra do Cachimbo Biological Reserve
- Serra do Pardo National Park
- Saracá-Taquera National Forest
- Trairão National Forest
- Itaituba I National Forest
- Itaituba II National Forest
- Amaná National Forest
- Rio Novo National Park

== Municipalities ==
The new state's largest city and proposed capital would be Santarém. Tapajós would have a population of about 1.3 million and an area of 722,358 square kilometres (278,904 sq mi), comprising 27 out of Pará's 144 municipalities. As of 2011, its GDP of BRL 6.4 billion constituted 11% of the total GDP of Pará. The planned Belo Monte Dam would be located on the border of the territory of Tapajós with either the new, smaller Pará or the also proposed new state of Carajás.

The two most populous municipalities would be Santarém (population 294,774) and Altamira (population 105,030).

=== List of municipalities in the proposed state ===
Name	ImmGR (Note: Immediate Geographic Region (succeeding unit to the Microregion of Brazil))	IntGR (Note: Intermediate Geographic Region (succeeding unit to the Mesoregion of Brazil))
Alenquer	Santarém	Santarém
Almeirim	Almeirim-Porto de Moz	Altamira
Altamira	Altamira	Altamira
Aveiro	Itaituba	Santarém
Belterra	Santarém	Santarém
Brasil Novo	Altamira	Altamira
Curuá	Oriximiná	Santarém
Faro	Oriximiná	Santarém
Itaituba	Itaituba	Santarém
Jacareacanga	Itaituba	Santarém
Juruti	Oriximiná	Santarém
Medicilândia	Altamira	Altamira
Mojuí dos Campos	Santarém	Santarém
Monte Alegre	Santarém	Santarém
Novo Progresso	Itaituba	Santarém
Óbidos	Oriximiná	Santarém
Oriximiná	Oriximiná	Santarém
Placas	Itaituba	Santarém
Porto de Moz	Almeirim-Porto de Moz	Altamira
Prainha	Santarém	Santarém
Rurópolis	Itaituba	Santarém
Santarém	Santarém	Santarém
Senador José Porfírio	Altamira	Altamira
Terra Santa	Oriximiná	Santarém
Trairão	Itaituba	Santarém
Uruará	Altamira	Altamira
Vitória do Xingu	Altamira	Altamira

== Secession movement ==
=== 2011 referendum ===
In a referendum held on December 11, 2011, the residents of the entire state of Pará were asked to vote on proposals to split the state into three parts: Tapajós in the west, Carajás in the southeast, and a rump Pará in the northeast. The proposal to create Tapajós was defeated by a margin of 66.1% to 33.9%. Voting was highly polarized regionally, with voters in the territories of the proposed new states voting strongly in favor, while voters in the rump Pará voted strongly against. In particular, more than 90% of voters in Santarém voted in favor, while more than 90% of voters in Pará's capital city of Belém voted against. As Belém and its surrounding area comprise over half the population of the original state, the proposal had no chance of passing. The mayor of Santarém, Maria do Carmo, vowed to continue efforts to create the new state.

=== 2019-present ===
In 2019, a new request for the division of the state of Pará was filed with the Senate's Constitution and Justice Committee (CCJ), with only the state of Tapajós being proposed. The project received a favorable opinion from the rapporteur in the CCJ in November 2021. If approved, it will proceed to analysis in the Chamber of Deputies. In this proposal, 4 municipalities that were in the first movement of 2011 and voted against the creation of the new state in the 2011 Plebiscite were removed: Altamira, Porto de Moz, Senador José Porfírio and Vitória do Xingu .

== Feasibility ==
According to studies by the Institute for Applied Economic Research (IPEA) (the body responsible for socio-economic studies) on the viability of the new state, the total economic cost of the new federative unit would be R$832 million annually.

The study predicts an increase in state public spending in Tapajós by approximately 98%, compromising about 35% of the state's GDP. The cost of running the public administration as a percentage of Tapajós' GDP would then be higher than the national average, which is around 12.74%, making the project unfeasible.

== See also ==
- Carajás - the other proposed state to be carved out of Pará, with the proposal also defeated in the December 2011 referendum
