= 2027 Campeonato Paraense =

Campeonato Paraense
- Season: 2027
- Dates: 9 January – 14 March

The 2027 Campeonato Paraense will be the 115th edition of Pará's top professional football league. The competition starts on 9 January and ends on 14 March.

== Format ==
Two groups with six clubs, with the teams of one group facing those of the other two. The eight best teams in the overall standings advance to the final stage. The matches of the quarter-finals and semi-finals will be played on a single-legged ties. The finals will be played on a home-and-away two-legged basis.

The two worst teams in the overall standings will be relegated to the 2028 Campeonato Paraense Second Division. The four teams eliminated in the quarter-finals and the two teams eliminated in the semi-finals will be transferred to the Copa Grão-Pará.

The champion, the runner-up and the 3rd-placed team qualify to the 2028 Copa do Brasil. The champion and the runner-up qualify to the 2028 Copa Norte. The best two teams who are not in the Campeonato Brasileiro Série A, Série B or Série C qualify to participate in the 2028 Campeonato Brasileiro Série D.

== Participating teams ==
Locations of the 2027 Campeonato Paraense teams
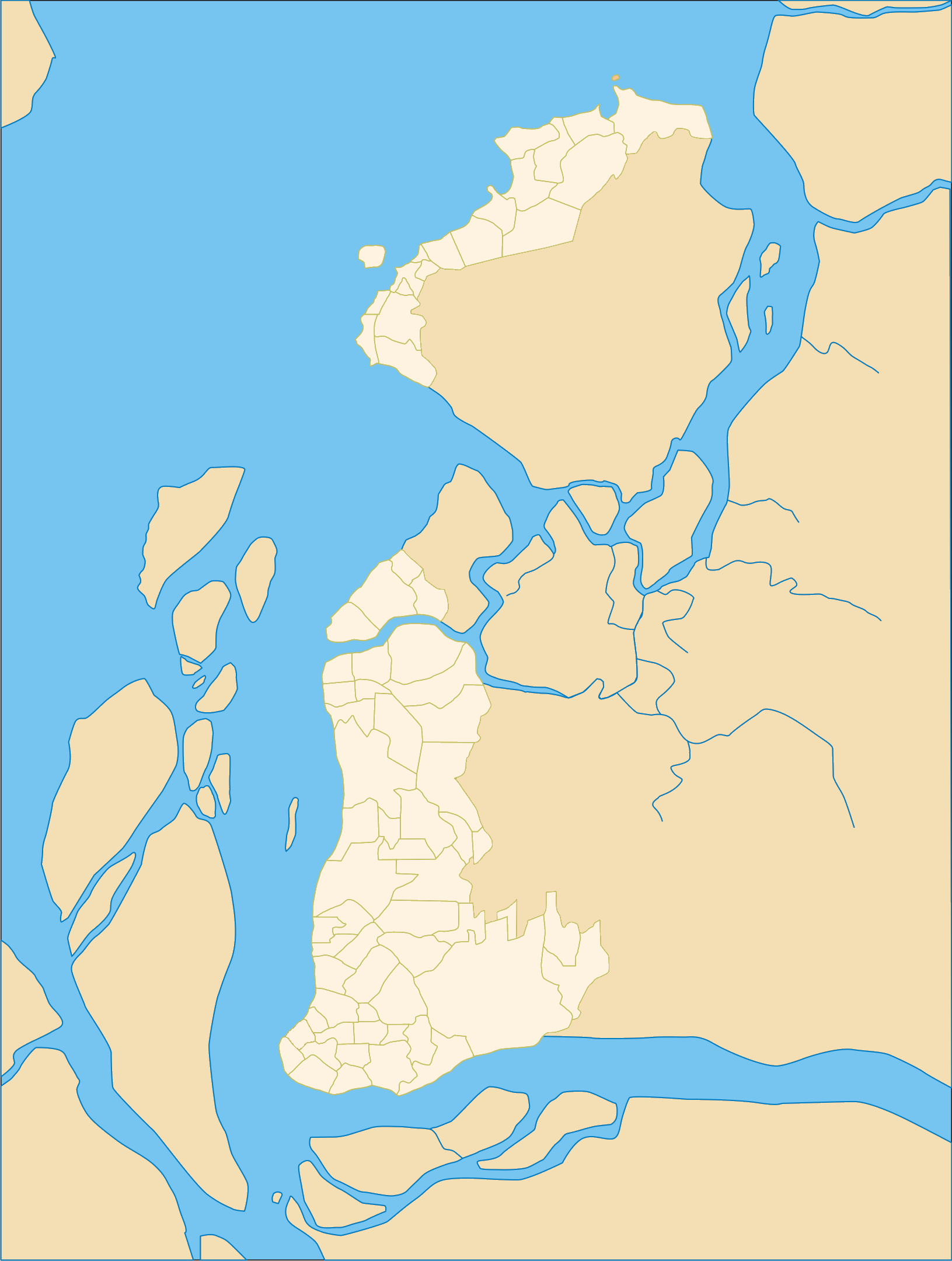
Locations of the 2027 Campeonato Paraense teams – Belém

Club	Home city	Head coach	2026 result
Águia de Marabá	Marabá	Flávio Tanajura	5th
Amazônia Independente	Santarém	Walter Lima	10th
Cametá	Cametá	Sandro Macapá	3rd
Capitão Poço	Capitão Poço	Thallys Romão	6th
Castanhal	Castanhal	Guilherme Furtado	4th
Izabelense	Santa Isabel do Pará	Mathaus Sodré	2nd (2nd Division)
Paysandu	Belém	Ignácio Neto	1st
Remo	Belém	—	2nd
Santa Rosa	Belém	Robson Melo	8th
São Raimundo	Santarém	Rogerinho Gameleira	9th
Tuna Luso	Belém	Pedro Chaves	7th
Urumajó	Augusto Corrêa	Aldenir Risada	1st (2nd Division)
