= Ipixuna do Pará =

Coordinates: 2.55778°S 47.4939°W

- Municipality
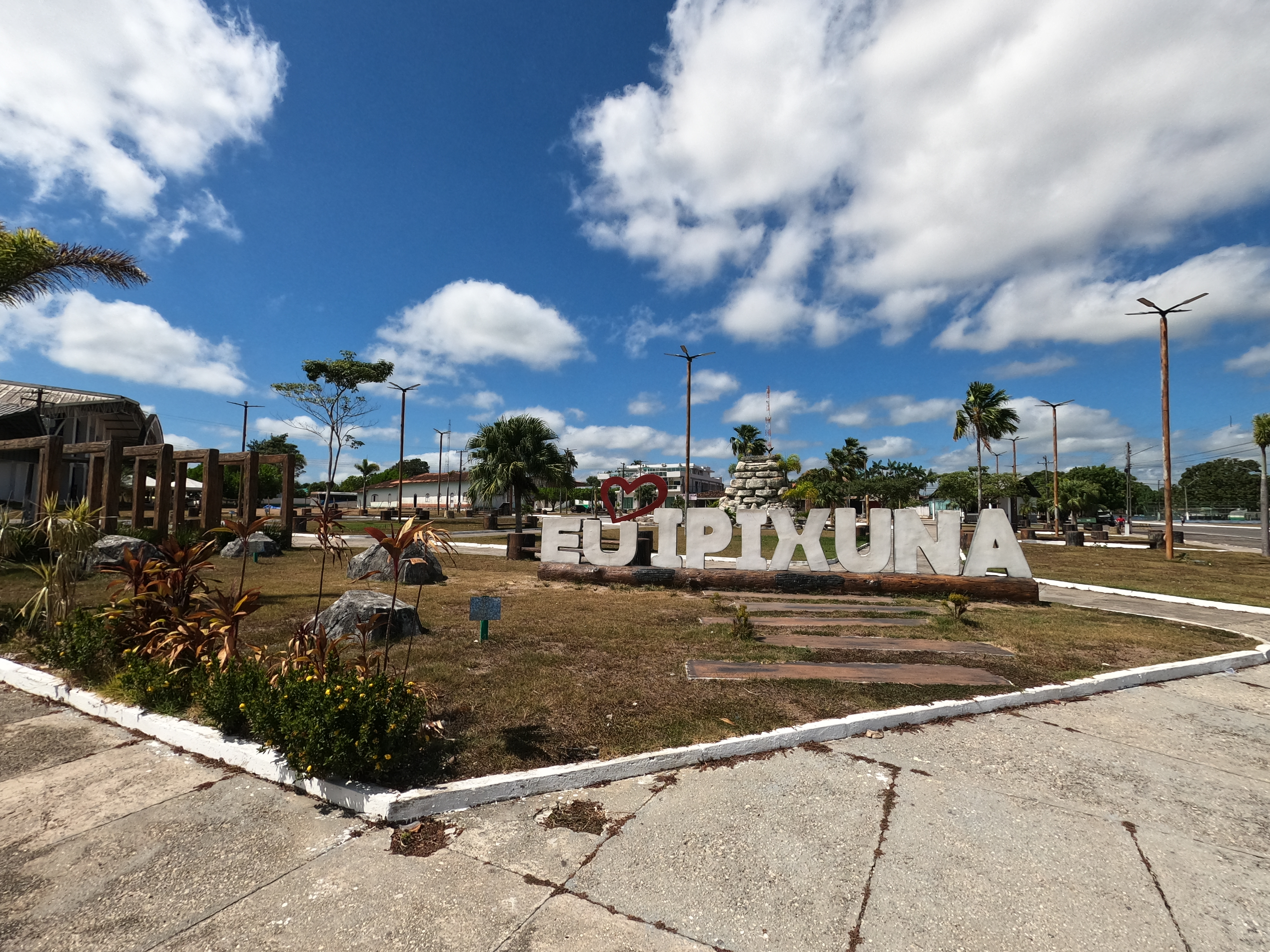

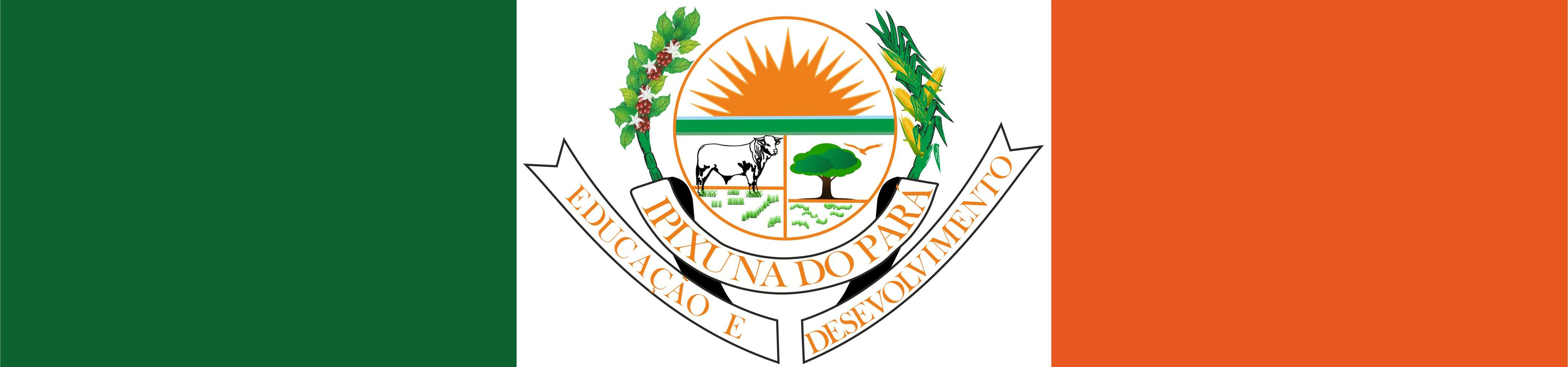
- Flag
- Interactive map of Ipixuna do Pará
- Country: Brazil
- Region: Northern
- State: Pará
- Mesoregion: Nordeste Paraense
- Bordering municipalities: Paragominas, Goianésia do Pará, Breu Branco, Moju, Tailândia, Tomé-Açu, Aurora do Pará, Capitão Poço and Nova Esperança do Piriá
- Distance to Capital: 250 km

Government
  - Mayor: Artemes Oliveira (MDB)

Area
  - Total: 2,014.275 sq mi (5,216.948 km^{2})

Population (2020)
  - Total: 65,625
- Time zone: UTC−3 (BRT)

Ipixuna do Pará is a municipality in the state of Pará in the Northern region of Brazil.

== History ==
In 1958, the pioneer arrived in the region Mr. Leonardo Manoel do Carmo, who, together with his family, composed of thirteen people, constituted the first inhabitants of what is now the Municipality Headquarters. The first step was to build a dwelling and then the mower. In their wake came Idelfonso Ribeiro, Irineu Farias, Antonio Cipriano and Manoel Henrique.

== Geography ==
Ipixuna do Pará is located in the Northeast Mesoregion of Pará, Microregion of Guamá, bordering the municipalities of Paragominas, Goianésia, Breu Branco, Tailândia, Tomé-Açu, Aurora do Pará, Capitão Poço e Nova Esperança do Piriá. The seat of the Municipality is 250 km from the State Capital-Belém, connected by road, BR-010 highway and by river through the Capim River. It has the following geographic coordinates: 02º 33' 03" south latitude and 47º 30' 06" west longitude of Greenwich, being at an altitude of 50 meters.

The municipality has an area of 5,215.555 km^{2} (2,013.737 sq mi) with a population, according to IBGE estimates in 2018, of 62,455 inhabitants, which gives it a demographic density of 9.84 inhabitants per km^{2}. The urban area has 12,227 residents, according to the 2010 Demographic Census.

== See also ==
- List of municipalities in Pará
