= Dendrographa austrosorediata =

Scientific classification
- Kingdom: Fungi
- Division: Ascomycota
- Class: Arthoniomycetes
- Order: Arthoniales
- Family: Roccellaceae
- Genus: Dendrographa
- Species: D. austrosorediata

Binomial name
- Dendrographa austrosorediata Aptroot & Gumboski (2017)

Species of lichen

Dendrographa austrosorediata is a species of saxicolous (rock-dwelling), crustose lichen in the family Roccellaceae. It was discovered and described as a new species in 2017 from coastal granite cliffs in southern Brazil. The lichen is characterised by its whitish-grey crusty surface covered with tiny reproductive granules and is found only in the spray zone above the high tide line.

== Taxonomy ==
Dendrographa austrosorediata was described as a new species in 2017 by André Aptroot and Emerson Luiz Gumboski on the basis of material collected from overhanging maritime granite at Prainha, São Francisco do Sul, Santa Catarina, Brazil. The authors assigned the epithet austrosorediata to emphasise the southern-hemispheric origin and the sorediate thallus.

DNA analyses of two genetic markers (28S rDNA and RPB2) show unequivocally that the species belongs to the Roccellaceae, clustering with the crustose species D. latebrarum in a well-supported Dendrographa clade; the analysis confirms that D. austrosorediata is one of the few strictly crustose members of a genus otherwise dominated by fruticose taxa. This molecular evidence, together with its distinctive morphology, justifies its treatment as a separate species within Dendrographa.

== Description ==
The lichen forms an indeterminate, crustose thallus that lies flat or develops shallow blister-like swellings which may curl slightly at the margins. Thalli are whitish-grey, very finely cracked (the rimose fissures intersect roughly every 0.1 mm) and only 0.1–0.2 mm thick. A thin black prothalline line may be visible at the colony edge. The cortex is 20–40 micrometres (μm) thick, the medulla is not differentiated, and the photobiont is of the green algal genus Trentepohlia, with cells 6–11 μm in diameter.

Vegetative propagation dominates: minute, whitish- to bluish-grey soredia (18–32 μm) arise in discrete convex soralia 0.2–0.4 mm across which later coalesce, ultimately covering much of the thallus surface. The side of each soralium that faces the light often darkens, producing an asymmetrical, blackened zone. Sexual and asexual fruit-bodies have not been observed, and no pycnidia are known.

Chemically, both thallus and soredia give a C+ (red) reaction; thin-layer chromatography detects erythrin and lecanoric acid.

== Habitat and distribution ==
Dendrographa austrosorediata colonises dry, overhanging faces of maritime granite in the upper supralittoral 'grey zone' of coastal cliffs, a microhabitat characterised by intermittent sea spray but protection from direct wave impact. At the type locality it occurs about 10 m above sea level, sharing the rock surface with other saxicolous Roccellaceae and a suite of cosmopolitan crustose lichens.

At the time of its original publication, the species was known only from the type locality in Santa Catarina, southern Brazil, where it appears to be endemic; no additional populations had been reported despite targeted surveys of nearby littoral habitats.
