= Raykkonen =

Brazilian footballer (born 2008)

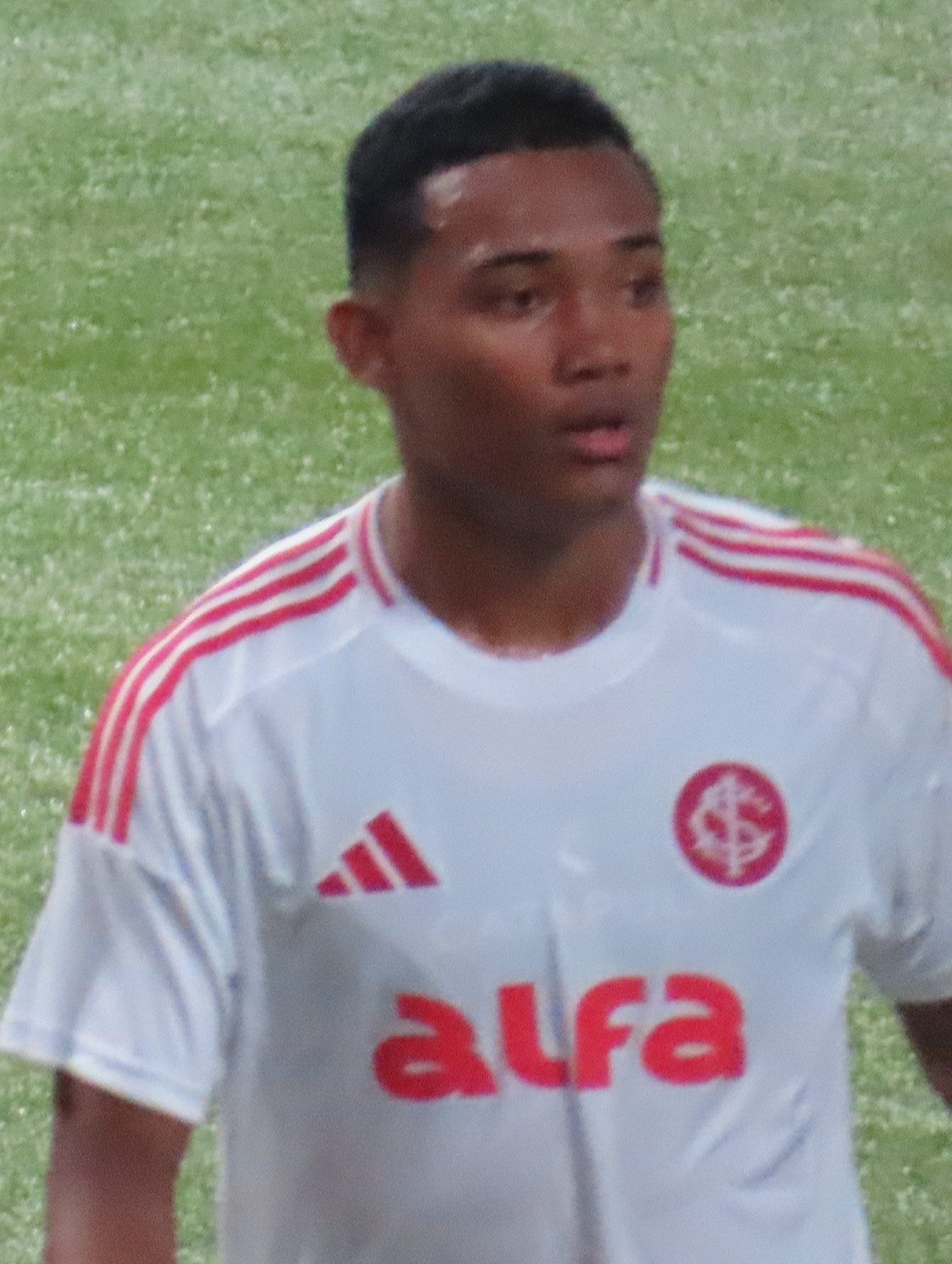
- Raykkonen playing for Internacional in 2025

Personal information
- Full name: Raykkonen Pereira Soares
- Date of birth: 13 July 2008 (age 18)
- Place of birth: Mãe do Rio, Brazil
- Height: 1.87 m (6 ft 2 in)
- Position: Forward

Team information
- Current team: Internacional
- Number: 48

Youth career
- 2021–2025: Goiás

Senior career*
Years	Team	Apps	(Gls)
2025–2026	Goiás	0	(0)
2025–2026	→ Internacional (loan)	10	(0)
2026–	Internacional	0	(0)
- * Club domestic league appearances and goals as of 15:14, 26 February 2026 (UTC)

Raykkonen Pereira Soares (born 13 July 2008), simply known as Raykkonen, is a Brazilian professional footballer who plays as a forward for Internacional.

== Early life ==
Named after Formula One racing driver Kimi Räikkönen, Raykkonen was born in Mãe do Rio, Pará.

== Career ==
Having joined the youth sides of Goiás at the age of 13, Raykkonen signed his first professional contract with the club on 15 September 2024, agreeing to a three-year deal. On 7 February 2025 he was loaned to Internacional until January 2026, being initially assigned to the under-17 team.

Raykkonen made his first team debut on 29 April 2025; after coming on as a second-half substitute for Enner Valencia in a Copa do Brasil match against Maracanã, he scored a goal after 15 minutes on the field, but it was ultimately annulled by the VAR, and the match would later finish 1–0. On 5 February 2026, Inter announced they activated Raykkonen's R$ 2 million release clause, and he signed a permanent contract until February 2029.

== Career statistics ==
As of 19 November 2025

Appearances and goals by club, season and competition
Club	Season	League			State League		National Cup		Continental		Other		Total	
Club	Season	Division	Apps	Goals	Apps	Goals	Apps	Goals	Apps	Goals	Apps	Goals	Apps	Goals
Internacional	2025	Série A	7	0	0	0	1	0	0	0	—		8	0
Internacional	2026	Série A	0	0	3	0	0	0	—		—		3	0
Career total			7	0	3	0	1	0	0	0	0	0	11	0
