= Tapajós (disambiguation) =

The Tapajós is a tributary of the Amazon River in Brazil.

Tapajós may also refer to:

- Tapajós (proposed Brazilian state)
- Tapajós Futebol Clube, a Brazilian association football team in Santarém, Pará
- Tapajós National Forest in the Brazilian state of Pará
- Tapajós people, an indigenous people of Brazil during the 17th century
- Tapajós languages, a group of languages
