= Alexandre Guimarães (politician) =

Brazilian politician (born 1986)

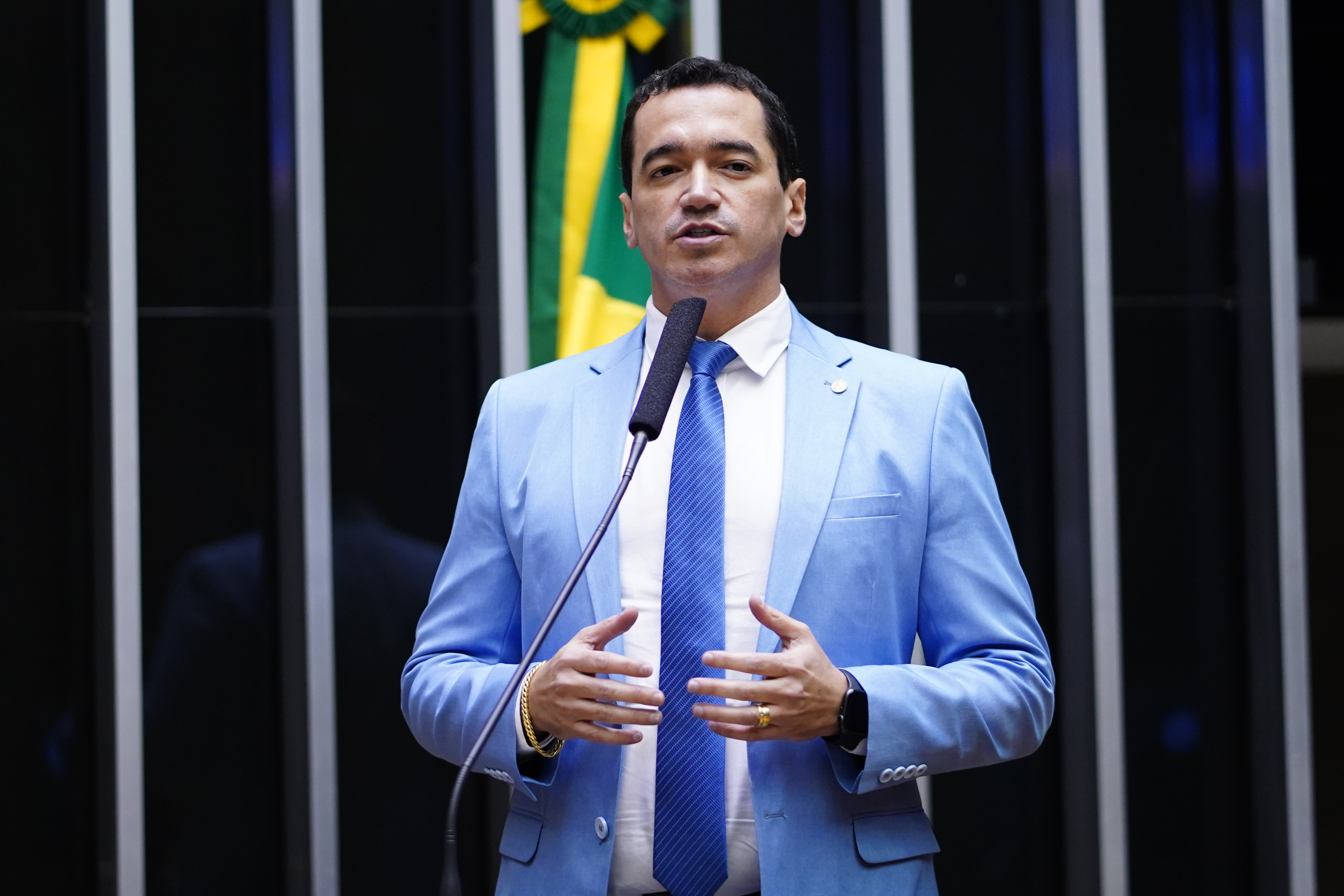
- Guimarães in 2023

Member of the Chamber of Deputies
- Incumbent
- Assumed office 1 February 2023
- Constituency: Tocantins

Personal details
- Born: 19 February 1986 (age 40)
- Party: Brazilian Democratic Movement (since 2024)

José Alexandre Domingues Guimarães (born 19 February 1986) is a Brazilian politician serving as a member of the Chamber of Deputies since 2023. From 2017 to 2020, he served as deputy mayor of Novo Repartimento.
