= Primavera, Pará =

- Municipality
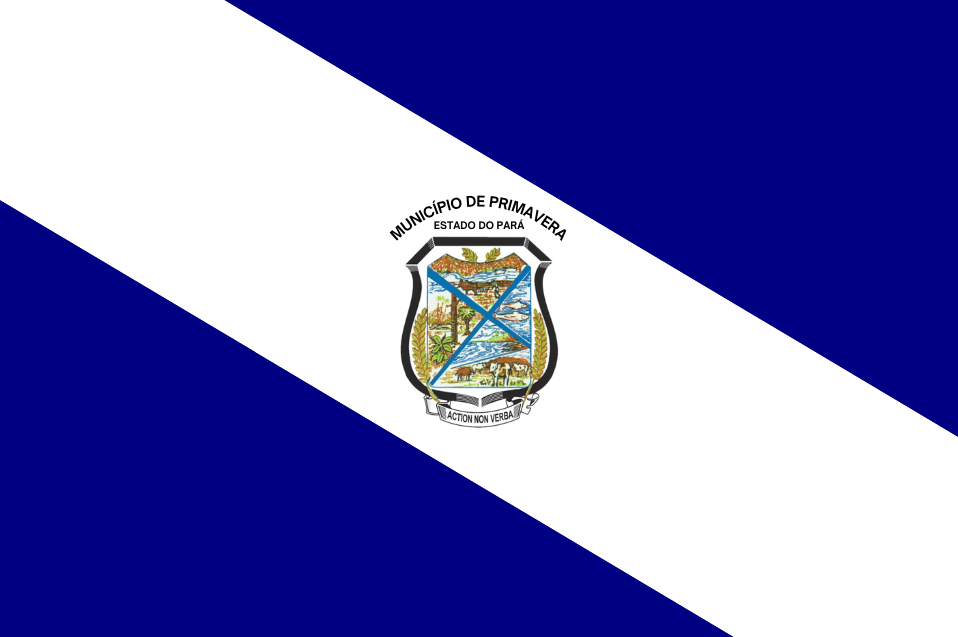
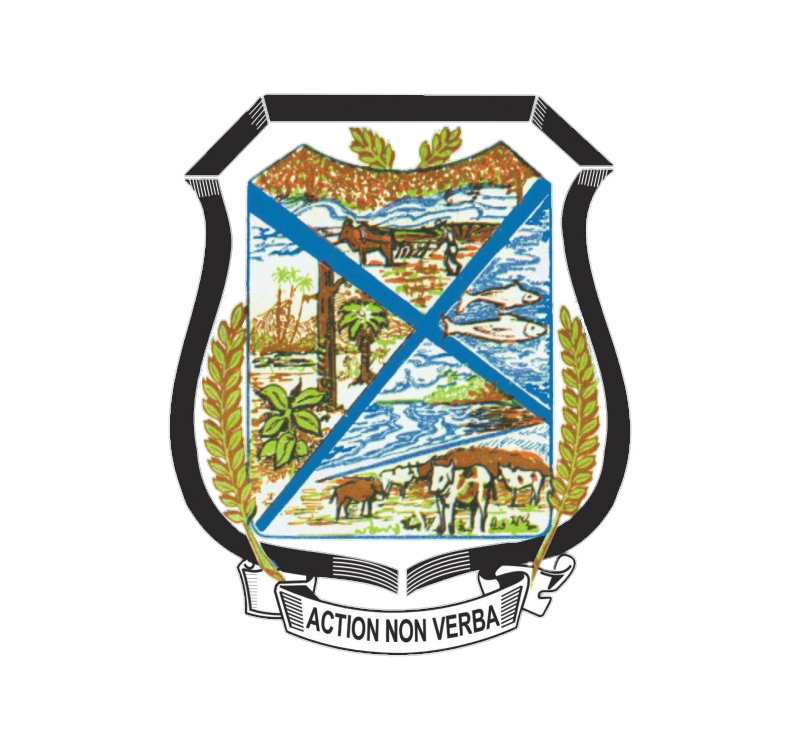
- Flag Coat of arms
- Interactive map of Primavera, Pará
- Country: Brazil
- Region: Northern
- State: Pará
- Mesoregion: Nordeste Paraense

Population (2020)
  - Total: 10,857
- Time zone: UTC−3 (BRT)

Primavera, Pará is a municipality in the state of Pará in the Northern region of Brazil. The municipality is located at 0°56′25″S, 47°06′59″W, at an average elevation of 48 metres above sea level.

== See also ==
- List of municipalities in Pará
