= Santa Bárbara do Pará =

Coordinates: 1.22389°S 48.2939°W

- Municipality
- Flag Coat of arms

- Country: Brazil
- Region: Northern
- State: Pará
- Mesoregion: Metropolitana de Belém

Population (2020)
  - Total: 21,449
- Time zone: UTC−3 (BRT)

Santa Bárbara do Pará is a municipality in the state of Pará in the Northern region of Brazil.

== See also ==
- List of municipalities in Pará
