= 2011 Pará state division plebiscite =

Vote in Brazil

Pará state division plebiscite
- 11 December 2011
- Are you in favor of the division of the State of Pará for the creation of the State of Carajás/Tapajós?
- Proposed division of Pará Pará Carajás Tapajós

The 2011 Pará state division plebiscite was held on 11 December 2011 to decide whether the Brazilian state of Pará should be divided into three separate states: Pará, Carajás, and Tapajós. At the time, it was the largest regional plebiscite in Brazilian history.

== Plebiscite development ==
Prior to the plebiscite, there it was debated whether the vote should be limited to the proposed regions of Carajás and Tapajós, or include the entire state of Pará. This uncertainty stemmed from questions about the constitutionality of Law No. 9,709/1998, which mandates statewide participation in plebiscites concerning territorial divisions. On 24 August 2011, it was decided that the entire population of Pará would participate in the vote, requiring majority support statewide for the creation of the new states.

The Superior Electoral Court ordered that, by 2 September, members of the Legislative Assembly of Pará, the Chamber of Deputies, and the Federal Senate had decide whether to support or oppose the creation of the new states. Both sides would be registered in the Regional Electoral Court of Pará by 12 September.

The campaign in support of the creation of the two new states began on 13 September, advertising on the internet, via flyers and sound cars. The first opinion polls could also be registered at the Electoral Court of Pará from this date.

The campaign on radio and TV began on 11 November, ending three days before the plebiscite. On 23 November, polls were ended, and on 10 December, campaigning using speakers and sound amplifiers came to an end. Distribution of printed materials was also prohibited from that date on. The final result of the plebiscite was published just two hours after voting ended.

Voters who had the intention to participate in the plebiscite had to enroll until 11 September. In the polls, the residents of Pará answered two questions: "Are you in favor of the division of the State of Pará for the creation of the State of Carajás?" and "Are you in favor of the division of the State of Pará for the creation of the State of Tapajós?"

Of the new states, Tapajós would have occupied 58% of the current territory of Pará and would have consisted of 27 municipalities, while Carajás would have received 25% of the territory and 39 municipalities. The remaining 17% of the territory would retain the name Pará.

According to the Superior Electoral Court, the cost of the plebiscite surpassed R$19 million (about US$11,360,000 in 2011).

== Opinion polls ==
Pollster/client(s)	Date(s) conducted	Sample size	Carajás				Tapajós							
Pollster/client(s)	Date(s) conducted	Sample size	Yes	No	Abst. Undec.	Lead	Yes	No	Abst. Undec.	Lead				
2011 plebiscite	11 Dec	–	33.4%	66.6%	Abst. Undec.	Lead	1.46%	33.2%	Abst. Undec.	Lead	33.92%	66.08%	1.49%	32.16%
Datafolha	6–8 Dec	1,213	31%	65%	4%	34%	32%	64%	4%	32%				
Datafolha	7–10 Nov	880	33%	58%	8%	25%	33%	58%	10%	25%				

== Results ==
Carajás creation plebiscite
Choice	Votes	%
For	1,185,546	33.40
Against	2,363,561	66.60
Total	3,549,107	100.00
Valid votes	3,549,107	98.54
Invalid/blank votes	52,742	1.46
Total votes	3,601,849	100.00
Registered voters/turnout	4,848,495	74.29
Source: TSE

Statewide referendum results
No: 2,363,561 (66.6%)	Yes: 1,185,546 (33.3%)
▲

Tapajós creation plebiscite
Choice	Votes	%
For	1,203,574	33.92
Against	2,344,654	66.08
Total	3,548,228	100.00
Valid votes	3,548,228	98.51
Invalid/blank votes	53,621	1.49
Total votes	3,601,849	100.00
Registered voters/turnout	4,848,495	74.29
Source: TSE

Statewide referendum results
No: 2,344,654 (66.08%)	Yes: 1,203,574 (33.92%)
▲

== Analysis ==
Voting was highly polarized regionally, with voters in the territories of the proposed new states voting strongly in favor, while voters in rump Pará voted strongly against. In particular, more than 90% of voters in Santarém (the proposed capitol of Tapajós) voted in favor, as did more than 90% of voters in Marabá (the proposed capitol of Carajás), while more than 90% of voters in Pará's capital city of Belém voted against. As Belém and its surrounding area comprise over half the population of the original state, the proposal had no chance of passing. The mayor of Santarém, Maria do Carmo, vowed to continue efforts to create the new state of Tapajós.
