= São João de Pirabas =

- Municipality
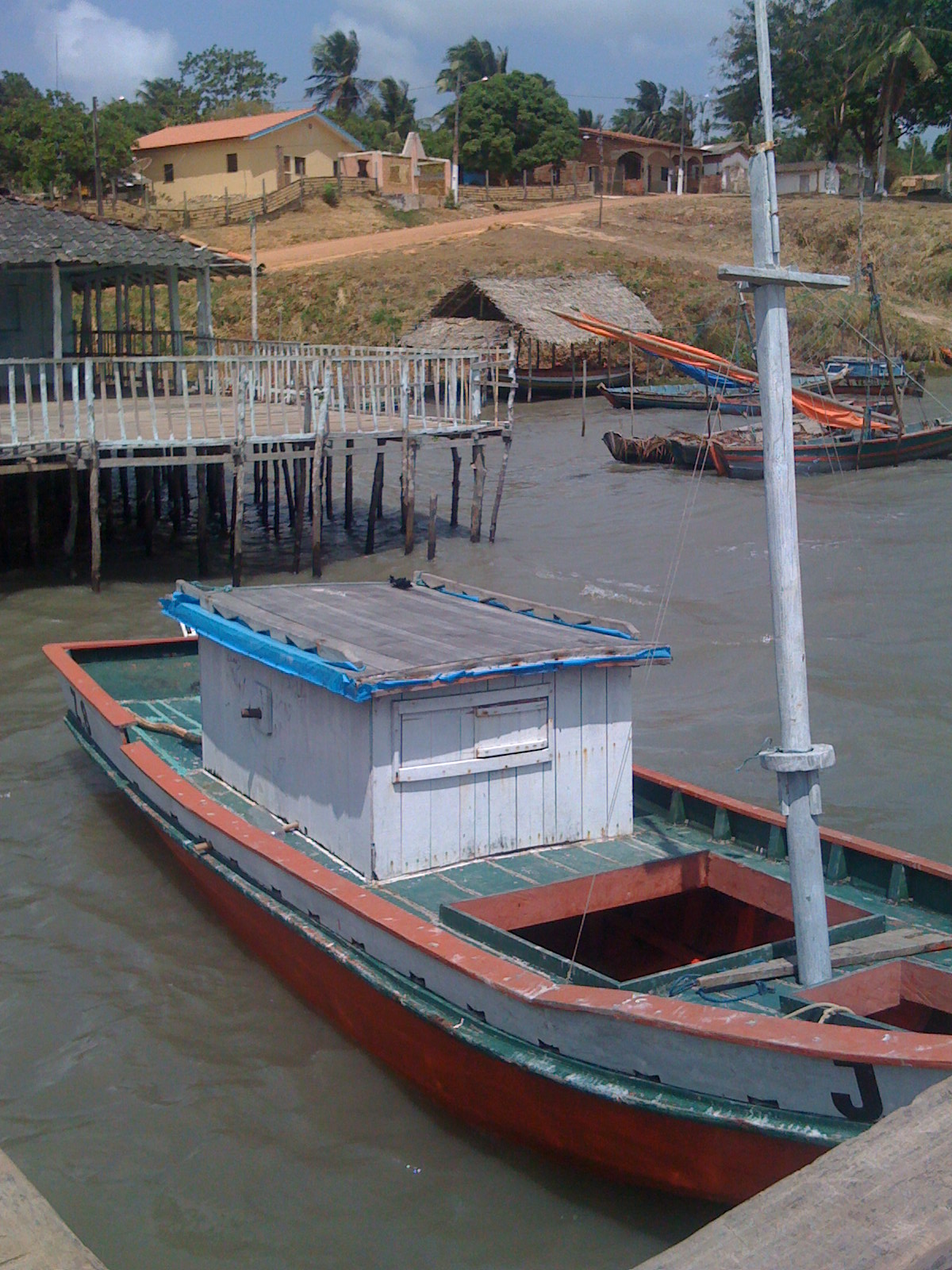

- Location in Brazil São João de Pirabas (Brazil)
- Coordinates: 0°46′S 47°10′W
- Country: Brazil
- Region: Northern
- State: Pará
- Mesoregion: Nordeste Paraense

Population (2020)
  - Total: 23,244
- Time zone: UTC−3 (BRT)

São João de Pirabas is a municipality in the state of Pará in the Northern region of Brazil.

== See also ==
- List of municipalities in Pará
