= List of municipalities in Pará =

This is a list of the municipalities in the state of Pará (PA), located in the North Region of Brazil. Pará is divided into 144 municipalities, which are grouped into 22 microregions, which are grouped into 6 mesoregions.

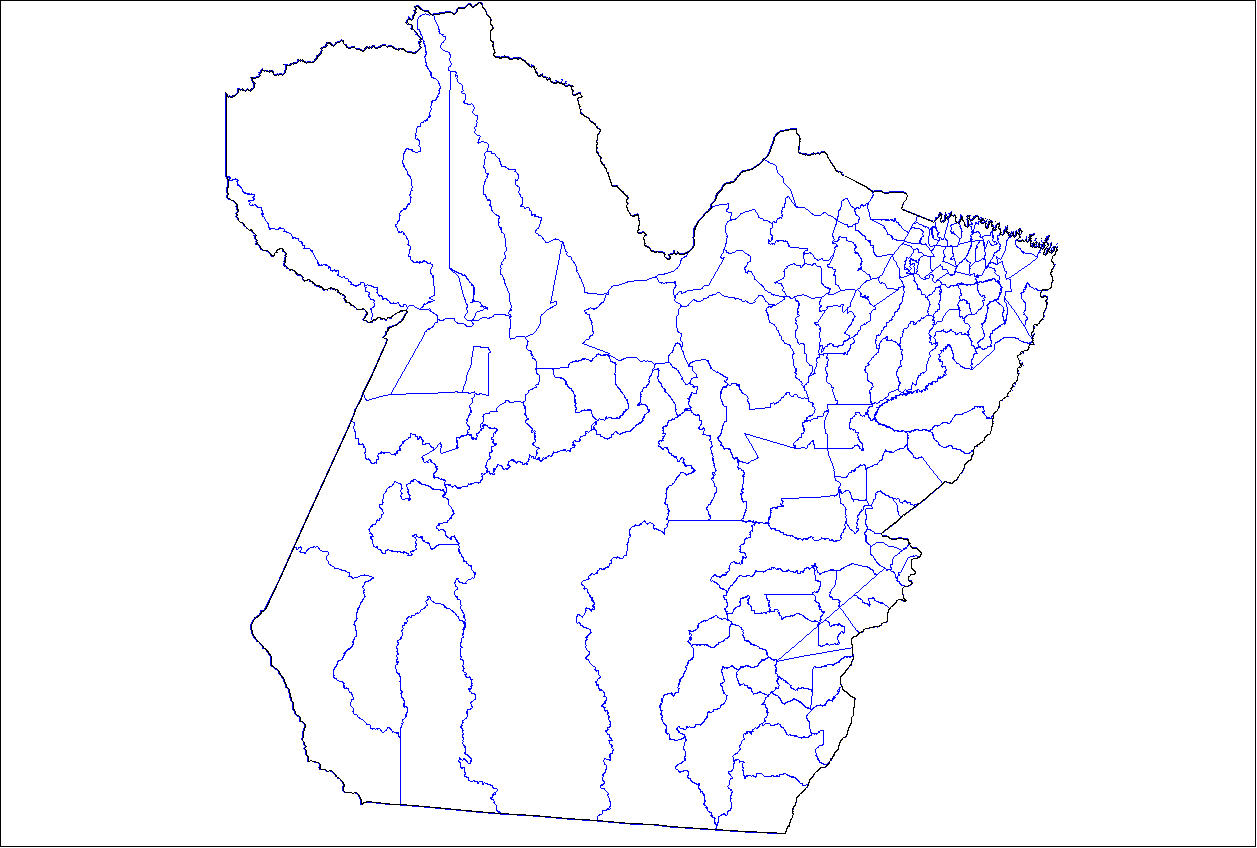
Municipalities of Para, Brazil

Mesoregion	Microregion	Municipality	Population
Baixo Amazonas	Almeirim	Almeirim	34,280
Baixo Amazonas	Almeirim	Porto de Moz	40,597
Baixo Amazonas	Óbidos	Faro	8,728
Baixo Amazonas	Óbidos	Juruti	50,881
Baixo Amazonas	Óbidos	Óbidos	52,229
Baixo Amazonas	Óbidos	Oriximiná	68,294
Baixo Amazonas	Óbidos	Terra Santa	18,782
Baixo Amazonas	Santarém	Alenquer	69,377
Baixo Amazonas	Santarém	Belterra	18,099
Baixo Amazonas	Santarém	Curuá	14,117
Baixo Amazonas	Santarém	Mojuí dos Campos	23,501
Baixo Amazonas	Santarém	Monte Alegre	60,012
Baixo Amazonas	Santarém	Placas	18,668
Baixo Amazonas	Santarém	Prainha	35,577
Baixo Amazonas	Santarém	Santarém	331,942
Marajó	Arari	Cachoeira do Arari	23,981
Marajó	Arari	Chaves	20,757
Marajó	Arari	Muaná	45,368
Marajó	Arari	Ponta de Pedras	24,984
Marajó	Arari	Salvaterra	24,129
Marajó	Arari	Santa Cruz do Arari	7,445
Marajó	Arari	Soure	24,204
Marajó	Furos de Breves	Afuá	37,765
Marajó	Furos de Breves	Anajás	28,011
Marajó	Furos de Breves	Breves	106,968
Marajó	Furos de Breves	Curralinho	33,903
Marajó	Furos de Breves	São Sebastião da Boa Vista	25,643
Marajó	Portel	Bagre	31,892
Marajó	Portel	Gurupá	31,786
Marajó	Portel	Melgaço	27,881
Marajó	Portel	Portel	62,503
Metropolitana de Belém	Belém	Ananindeua	478,778
Metropolitana de Belém	Belém	Barcarena	126,650
Metropolitana de Belém	Belém	Belém (State Capital)	1,303,403
Metropolitana de Belém	Belém	Benevides	63,567
Metropolitana de Belém	Belém	Marituba	111,785
Metropolitana de Belém	Belém	Santa Bárbara do Pará	21,087
Metropolitana de Belém	Castanhal	Bujaru	24,383
Metropolitana de Belém	Castanhal	Castanhal	192,256
Metropolitana de Belém	Castanhal	Inhangapi	10,325
Metropolitana de Belém	Castanhal	Santa Isabel do Pará	73,019
Metropolitana de Belém	Castanhal	Santo Antônio do Tauá	27,461
Nordeste Paraense	Bragantina	Augusto Corrêa	44,573
Nordeste Paraense	Bragantina	Bonito	12,622
Nordeste Paraense	Bragantina	Bragança	123,082
Nordeste Paraense	Bragantina	Capanema	70,394
Nordeste Paraense	Bragantina	Igarapé-Açu	35,797
Nordeste Paraense	Bragantina	Nova Timboteua	12,806
Nordeste Paraense	Bragantina	Peixe-Boi	8,285
Nordeste Paraense	Bragantina	Primavera	10,851
Nordeste Paraense	Bragantina	Quatipuru	11,524
Nordeste Paraense	Bragantina	Santa Maria do Pará	24,624
Nordeste Paraense	Bragantina	Santarém Novo	6,116
Nordeste Paraense	Bragantina	São Francisco do Pará	14,894
Nordeste Paraense	Bragantina	Tracuateua	28,595
Nordeste Paraense	Cametá	Abaetetuba	158,188
Nordeste Paraense	Cametá	Baião	51,641
Nordeste Paraense	Cametá	Cametá	134,184
Nordeste Paraense	Cametá	Igarapé-Miri	64,831
Nordeste Paraense	Cametá	Limoeiro do Ajuru	29,569
Nordeste Paraense	Cametá	Mocajuba	27,198
Nordeste Paraense	Cametá	Oeiras do Pará	33,844
Nordeste Paraense	Guamá	Aurora do Pará	23,774
Nordeste Paraense	Guamá	Cachoeira do Piriá	19,630
Nordeste Paraense	Guamá	Capitão Poço	56,506
Nordeste Paraense	Guamá	Garrafão do Norte	24,703
Nordeste Paraense	Guamá	Ipixuna do Pará	30,329
Nordeste Paraense	Guamá	Irituia	30,955
Nordeste Paraense	Guamá	Mãe do Rio	34,353
Nordeste Paraense	Guamá	Nova Esperança do Piriá	20,478
Nordeste Paraense	Guamá	Ourém	17,855
Nordeste Paraense	Guamá	Santa Luzia do Pará	20,370
Nordeste Paraense	Guamá	São Domingos do Capim	30,599
Nordeste Paraense	Guamá	São Miguel do Guamá	52,894
Nordeste Paraense	Guamá	Viseu	58,692
Nordeste Paraense	Salgado	Colares	12,868
Nordeste Paraense	Salgado	Curuçá	41,626
Nordeste Paraense	Salgado	Magalhães Barata	8,115
Nordeste Paraense	Salgado	Maracanã	25,971
Nordeste Paraense	Salgado	Marapanim	26,573
Nordeste Paraense	Salgado	Salinópolis	44,772
Nordeste Paraense	Salgado	São Caetano de Odivelas	16,666
Nordeste Paraense	Salgado	São João da Ponta	4,430
Nordeste Paraense	Salgado	São João de Pirabas	20,689
Nordeste Paraense	Salgado	Terra Alta	10,400
Nordeste Paraense	Salgado	Vigia	50,832
Nordeste Paraense	Tomé-Açu	Acará	59,023
Nordeste Paraense	Tomé-Açu	Concórdia do Pará	26,881
Nordeste Paraense	Tomé-Açu	Moju	84,094
Nordeste Paraense	Tomé-Açu	Tailândia	72,493
Nordeste Paraense	Tomé-Açu	Tomé-Açu	67,585
Sudeste Paraense	Conceição do Araguaia	Conceição do Araguaia	44,617
Sudeste Paraense	Conceição do Araguaia	Floresta do Araguaia	17,898
Sudeste Paraense	Conceição do Araguaia	Santa Maria das Barreiras	16,548
Sudeste Paraense	Conceição do Araguaia	Santana do Araguaia	32,413
Sudeste Paraense	Marabá	Brejo Grande do Araguaia	6,783
Sudeste Paraense	Marabá	Marabá	266,533
Sudeste Paraense	Marabá	Palestina do Pará	6,885
Sudeste Paraense	Marabá	São Domingos do Araguaia	21,092
Sudeste Paraense	Marabá	São João do Araguaia	13,664
Sudeste Paraense	Paragominas	Abel Figueiredo	6,136
Sudeste Paraense	Paragominas	Bom Jesus do Tocantins	18,005
Sudeste Paraense	Paragominas	Dom Eliseu	58,484
Sudeste Paraense	Paragominas	Goianésia do Pará	26,362
Sudeste Paraense	Paragominas	Paragominas	105,550
Sudeste Paraense	Paragominas	Rondon do Pará	53,143
Sudeste Paraense	Paragominas	Ulianópolis	37,792
Sudeste Paraense	Parauapebas	Água Azul do Norte	18,080
Sudeste Paraense	Parauapebas	Canaã dos Carajás	77,079
Sudeste Paraense	Parauapebas	Curionópolis	19,950
Sudeste Paraense	Parauapebas	Eldorado dos Carajás	28,192
Sudeste Paraense	Parauapebas	Parauapebas	267,836
Sudeste Paraense	Redenção	Pau d'Arco	6,931
Sudeste Paraense	Redenção	Piçarra	12,832
Sudeste Paraense	Redenção	Redenção	85,597
Sudeste Paraense	Redenção	Rio Maria	18,384
Sudeste Paraense	Redenção	São Geraldo do Araguaia	24,255
Sudeste Paraense	Redenção	Sapucaia	5,847
Sudeste Paraense	Redenção	Xinguara	52,893
Sudeste Paraense	São Félix do Xingu	Bannach	4,031
Sudeste Paraense	São Félix do Xingu	Cumaru do Norte	14,036
Sudeste Paraense	São Félix do Xingu	Ourilândia do Norte	32,467
Sudeste Paraense	São Félix do Xingu	São Félix do Xingu	65,418
Sudeste Paraense	São Félix do Xingu	Tucumã	39,550
Sudeste Paraense	Tucurui	Breu Branco	45,712
Sudeste Paraense	Tucurui	Itupiranga	49,754
Sudeste Paraense	Tucurui	Jacundá	37,707
Sudeste Paraense	Tucurui	Nova Ipixuna	13,955
Sudeste Paraense	Tucurui	Novo Repartimento	60,732
Sudeste Paraense	Tucurui	Tucuruí	91,306
Sudoeste Paraense	Altamira	Altamira	126,279
Sudoeste Paraense	Altamira	Anapu	31,850
Sudoeste Paraense	Altamira	Brasil Novo	24,718
Sudoeste Paraense	Altamira	Medicilândia	27,094
Sudoeste Paraense	Altamira	Pacajá	41,097
Sudoeste Paraense	Altamira	Senador José Porfírio	22,576
Sudoeste Paraense	Altamira	Uruará	43,558
Sudoeste Paraense	Altamira	Vitória do Xingu	15,607
Sudoeste Paraense	Itaituba	Aveiro	18,290
Sudoeste Paraense	Itaituba	Itaituba	123,314
Sudoeste Paraense	Itaituba	Jacareacanga	24,042
Sudoeste Paraense	Itaituba	Novo Progresso	33,638
Sudoeste Paraense	Itaituba	Rurópolis	35,769
Sudoeste Paraense	Itaituba	Trairão	15,242

== See also ==
- Geography of Brazil
- List of cities in Brazil
