= Quatipuru =

Municipality in Pará, Brazil

- Municipality
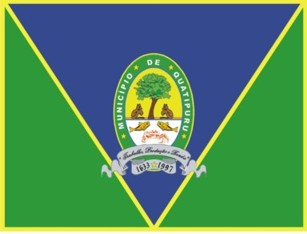
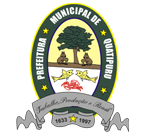
- Flag Coat of arms

- Location in Brazil Quatipuru (Brazil)
- Coordinates: 0°52′S 46°59′W
- Country: Brazil
- Region: Northern
- State: Pará
- Mesoregion: Nordeste Paraense

Population (2020)
  - Total: 13,702
- Time zone: UTC−3 (BRT)

Quatipuru is a municipality in the state of Pará in the Northern region of Brazil.

== See also ==
- List of municipalities in Pará
