= Limoeiro do Ajuru =

Coordinates: 1°55′S 49°23′W

- Municipality
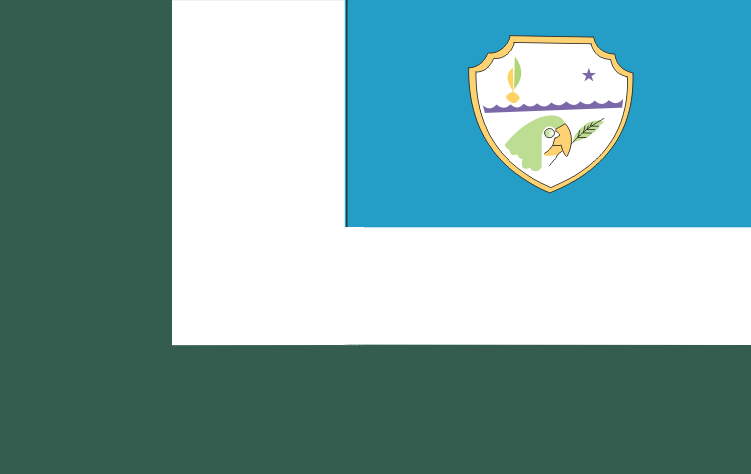
- Flag
- Interactive map of Limoeiro do Ajuru
- Country: Brazil
- Region: Northern
- State: Pará
- Mesoregion: Nordeste Paraense

Population (2020)
  - Total: 29,282
- Time zone: UTC−3 (BRT)

Limoeiro do Ajuru is a municipality in the state of Pará in the Northern region of Brazil.

== See also ==
- List of municipalities in Pará
