= Melgaço, Pará =

Melgaço
- Municipality
- Flag

- Location within Brazil
- Coordinates: 01°48′14″S 50°42′43″W
- Country: Brazil
- State: Pará

Government
  - Mayor: Jose Maria Rodrigues Viegas (PSDB)

Area
  - Total: 6,773.975 km^{2} (2,615.446 sq mi)
- Elevation: 12 m (39 ft)

Population (2022)
  - Total: 27,881
  - Density: 4.1159/km^{2} (10.660/sq mi)
- Time zone: UTC−3 (BRT)
- HDI: 0.418
- GDP: R$ 37,559,000
- GDP per capita: R$1.493,00

Melgaço is a municipality in the state of Pará in the North Region of Brazil. With an area of 6,772.764 square kilometers (2,614.979 sq mi), of which 1.7177 square kilometres (0.6632 sq mi) is urban, it is located 173 km from Belém, the state capital, and 1,503 km from Brasília, the federal capital. Its population in the 2022 demographic census was 27,881 inhabitants, according to the Brazilian Institute of Geography and Statistics (IBGE), ranking as the 77th most populous municipality in the state of Pará. Melgaço ranked lowest among all Brazilian municipalities in the Human Development Index (HDI-M) published by the United Nations Development Programme (UNDP) in 2010.

== Geography ==
The territory of Melgaço covers 6,772.764 square kilometers (2,614.979 sq mi), of which 1.7177 square kilometres (0.6632 sq mi) constitutes the urban area. It sits at an average altitude of 12 meters above sea level. Melgaço borders these municipalities: Portel, Breves, Bagre, Gurupá, and Porto de Moz. The city is located 173 km from the state capital Belém, and 1,503 km from the federal capital Brasília.

Under the territorial division established in 2017 by the Brazilian Institute of Geography and Statistics (IBGE), the municipality belongs to the immediate geographical region of Breves, within the intermediate region of Breves. Previously, under the microregion and mesoregion divisions, it was part of the microregion of Portel in the mesoregion of Marajó.

== Demographics ==
In the 2022 census, the municipality had a population of 27,881 inhabitants and ranked only 77th in the state that year (out of 144 municipalities), with 52.25% male and 47.75% female, resulting in a sex ratio of 109.43 (10,943 men for every 10,000 women), compared to 24,808 inhabitants in the 2010 census (22.18% living in the urban area), when it held the 88th state position. Between the 2010 and 2022 censuses, the population of Melgaço registered a growth of just over 12.4%, with an annual geometric growth rate of 0.98%. Regarding age group in the 2022 census, 57.89% of the inhabitants were between 15 and 64 years old, 38.54% were under fifteen, and 3.55% were 65 or older. The population density in 2022 was 4.12 inhabitants per square kilometer, with an average of 4.85 inhabitants per household.

The municipality's Human Development Index (HDI-M) is registered as the lowest-ranked in Brazil, according to data from the United Nations Development Programme. According to the 2010 report published in 2013, its value was 0.418, ranking 144th in the state and 5,565th nationally (out of 5,565 municipalities), and the Gini coefficient rose from 0.33 in 2003 to 0.55 in 2010. Considering only the longevity index, its value is 0.776, the income index is 0.454, and the education index is 0.207.

According to BBC News Brasil, in Melgaço, the school dropout rate among children aged six to fourteen in primary education is 14.6%, while in secondary education it reaches 21.2%. Additionally, 20% of residents aged fifteen or older are illiterate, and the average length of schooling among the population is five years.

== See also ==
- List of municipalities in Pará
