= Santo Antônio do Tauá =

Coordinates: 1°11′S 48°08′W

- Municipality
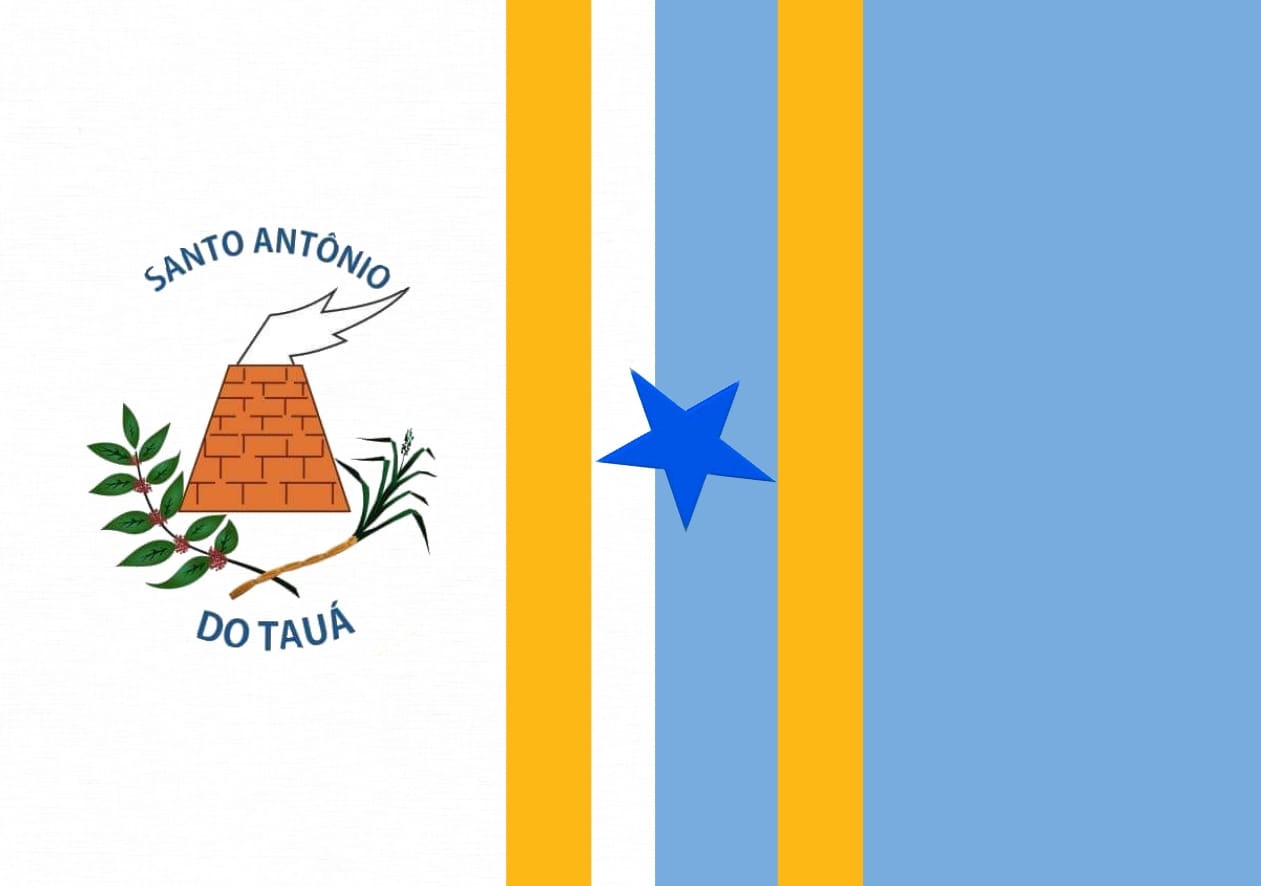
- Flag
- Interactive map of Santo Antônio do Tauá
- Country: Brazil
- Region: North
- State: Pará
- Mesoregion: Metropolitana de Belém

Population (2020)
  - Total: 31,918
- Time zone: UTC−3 (BRT)

Santo Antônio do Tauá is a municipality in the state of Pará in the North region of Brazil.

== See also ==
- List of municipalities in Pará
