= Santa Cruz do Arari =

- Municipality
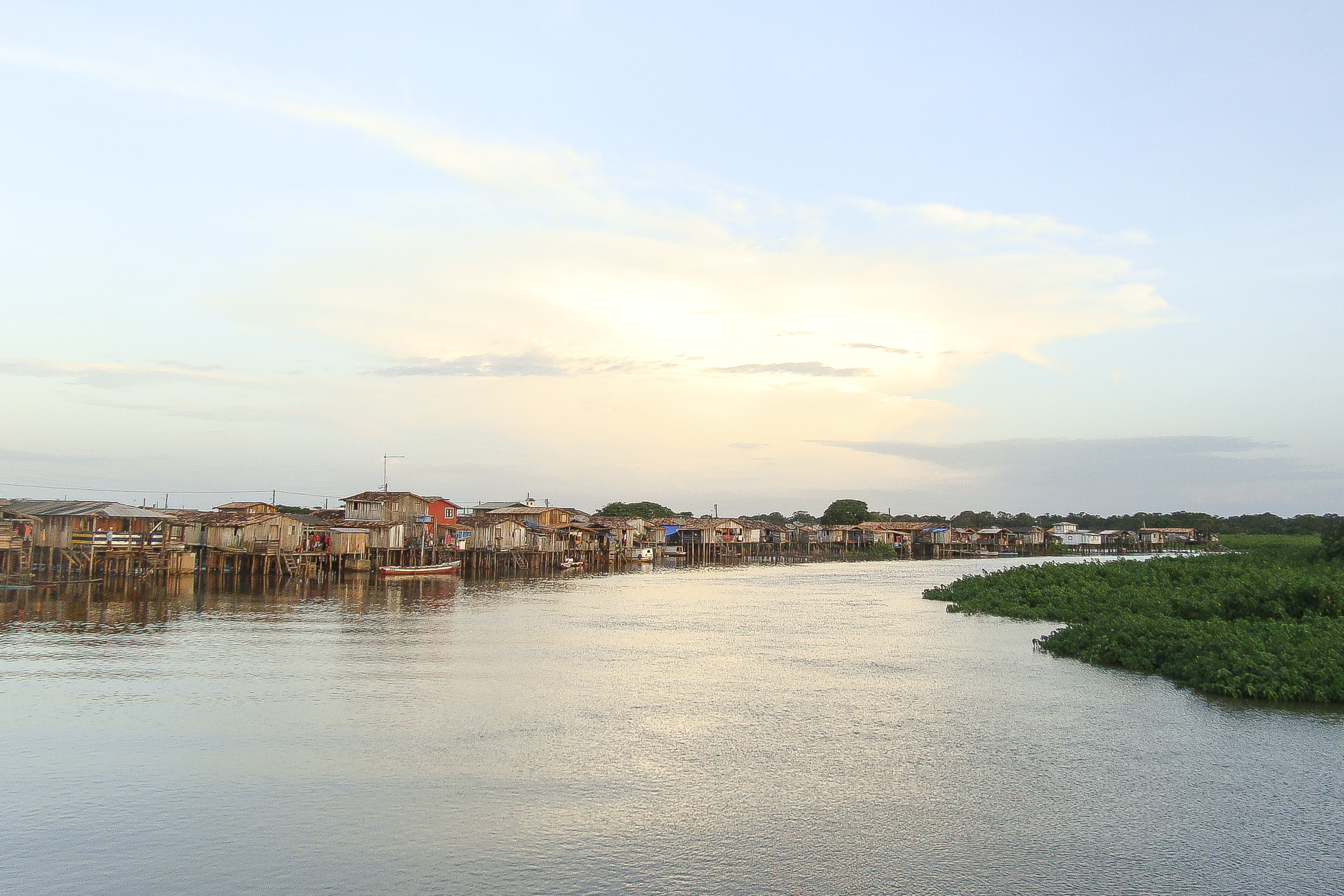

- Flag

- Location in the State of Pará

- Location within Brazil
- Coordinates: 00°39′50″S 49°09′46″W
- Country: Brazil
- Region: North
- State: Pará

Area
  - Total: 1,074.854 km^{2} (415.003 sq mi)
- Elevation: 6 m (20 ft)

Population (2020)
  - Total: 10,314
  - Density: 5.2/km^{2} (13/sq mi)
- Time zone: UTC−3 (BRT)
- Postal Code: 68850-000

Santa Cruz do Arari is a Brazilian municipality located in the state of Pará. Its population as of 2020 is estimated to be 10,314 people. The area of the municipality is 1,074.854 km^{2}. The city belongs to the mesoregion Marajó and the microregion of Arari.

In 2010, the mayor was Marcelo José Pamplona Beltrão. The United Nations HDI, or Human Development Index, score for Santa Cruz do Arari is 0.63.

Nearby Lake Arari is a large lake located on the island Marajó, which is a tourist attraction and the home of a wide variety of avian life. The municipality is contained in the 59,985-square-kilometre (23,160 sq mi) Marajó Archipelago Environmental Protection Area, a sustainable-use conservation unit established in 1989 to protect the environment of the delta region.

== See also ==
- List of municipalities in Pará
