= Piçarra =

Municipality in Pará, Brazil

Coordinates: 6.43778°S 48.8719°W

- Municipality
- Interactive map of Piçarra
- Country: Brazil
- Region: Northern
- State: Pará
- Mesoregion: Sudeste Paraense

Population (2020)
  - Total: 12,979
- Time zone: UTC−3 (BRT)

Piçarra is a municipality in the state of Pará in the Northern region of Brazil.

== See also ==
- List of municipalities in Pará
