= Água Azul do Norte =

Municipality in Pará, Brazil

- Municipality
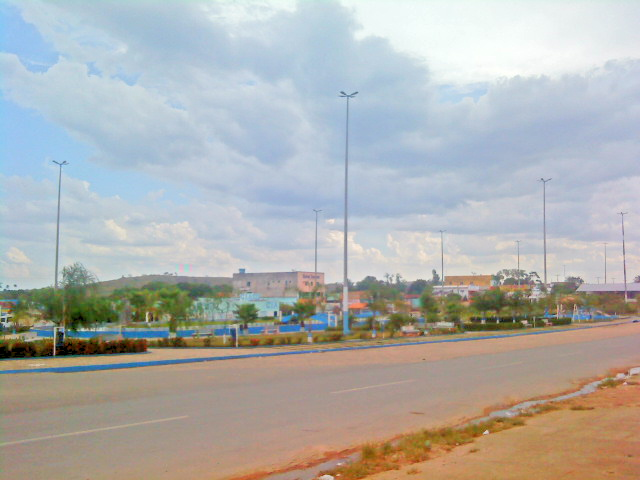

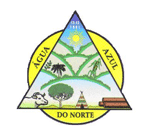
- Flag Coat of arms

- Location of Água Azul do Norte in the State of Pará

- Location in Brazil
- Coordinates: 6°47′27″S 50°28′01″W
- Country: Brazil
- Region: Northern
- State: Pará
- Mesoregion: Sudeste Paraense

Population (2020)
  - Total: 27,615
- Time zone: UTC−3 (BRT)
- Website: Official website

Água Azul do Norte is a municipality in the state of Pará in the Northern region of Brazil.

The municipality contains a small part of the Carajás National Forest, a 411,949-hectare (1,017,950-acre) sustainable use conservation unit created in 1998 that includes mining operations in a huge deposit of high-grade iron ore.

== See also ==
- List of municipalities in Pará
