= Vitória do Xingu =

Coordinates: 2.88°S 52.01°W

- Municipality
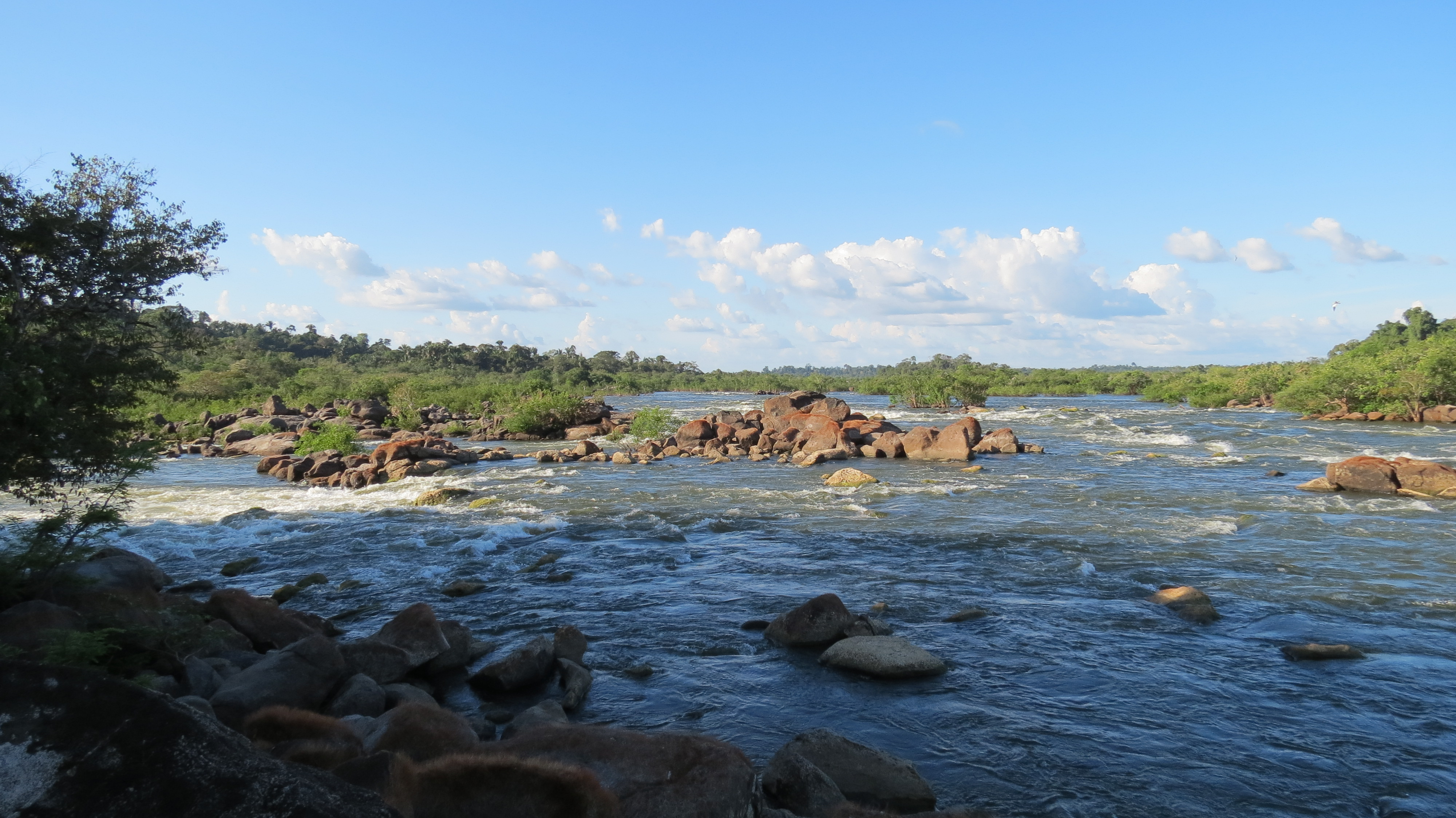
- Interactive map of Vitória do Xingu
- Country: Brazil
- Region: Northern
- State: Pará
- Mesoregion: Sudoeste Paraense

Population (2020)
  - Total: 15,279
- Time zone: UTC−3 (BRT)

Vitória do Xingu is a municipality in the state of Pará in the Northern region of Brazil.

== See also ==
- List of municipalities in Pará
