= Sapucaia, Pará =

Sapucaia
- Municipality
- Location in Brazil
- Coordinates: 6°56′49″S 49°40′55″W
- Country: Brazil
- Region: Northern
- State: Pará
- Mesoregion: Sudeste Paraense

Population (2020)
  - Total: 6,009
- Time zone: UTC−3 (BRT)

Sapucaia is a municipality in the state of Pará in the Northern region of Brazil.

== See also ==
- List of municipalities in Pará
