= Pau d'Arco, Pará =

Municipality in Pará, Brazil

Coordinates: 7°49′58″S 50°02′38″W

Pau d'Arco
- Municipality
- Interactive map of Pau d'Arco
- Country: Brazil
- Region: Northern
- State: Pará
- Mesoregion: Sudeste Paraense

Population (2020)
  - Total: 5,410
- Time zone: UTC−3 (BRT)

Pau d'Arco is a municipality in the state of Pará in the Northern region of Brazil.

== See also ==
- List of municipalities in Pará
- 2017 Santa Lúcia massacre
