= Brejo Grande do Araguaia =

Coordinates: 5.69889°S 48.4128°W

- Municipality
- Interactive map of Brejo Grande do Araguaia
- Country: Brazil
- Region: Northern
- State: Pará
- Mesoregion: Sudeste Paraense

Population (2020)
  - Total: 7,368
- Time zone: UTC−3 (BRT)

Brejo Grande do Araguaia is a municipality in the state of Pará in the Northern region of Brazil.

== See also ==
- List of municipalities in Pará
