= Bannach =

Coordinates: 7.34778°S 50.3958°W

- Municipality
- Interactive map of Bannach
- Country: Brazil
- Region: Northern
- State: Pará
- Mesoregion: Sudeste Paraense

Population (2020)
  - Total: 3,262
- Time zone: UTC−3 (BRT)

Bannach is a municipality in the state of Pará in the Northern region of Brazil.

== See also ==
- List of municipalities in Pará
