= Aurora do Pará =

Municipality in Pará, Brazil

Coordinates: 2.13389°S 47.5628°W

- Municipality
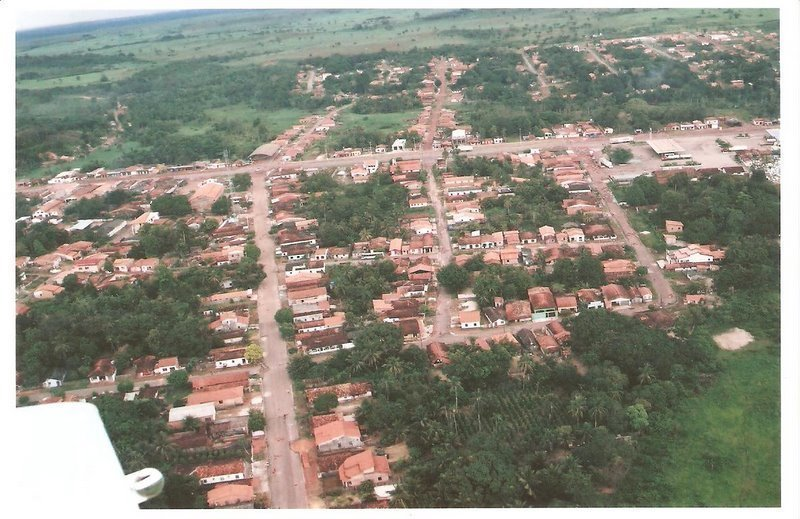

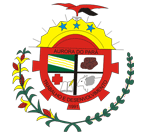
- Flag Coat of arms
- Interactive map of Aurora do Pará
- Country: Brazil
- Region: Northern
- State: Pará
- Mesoregion: Nordeste Paraense

Population (2020)
  - Total: 31,773
- Time zone: UTC−3 (BRT)

Aurora do Pará is a municipality in the state of Pará in the Northern region of Brazil.

== See also ==
- List of municipalities in Pará
