= Mojuí dos Campos =

Municipality in Pará, Brazil

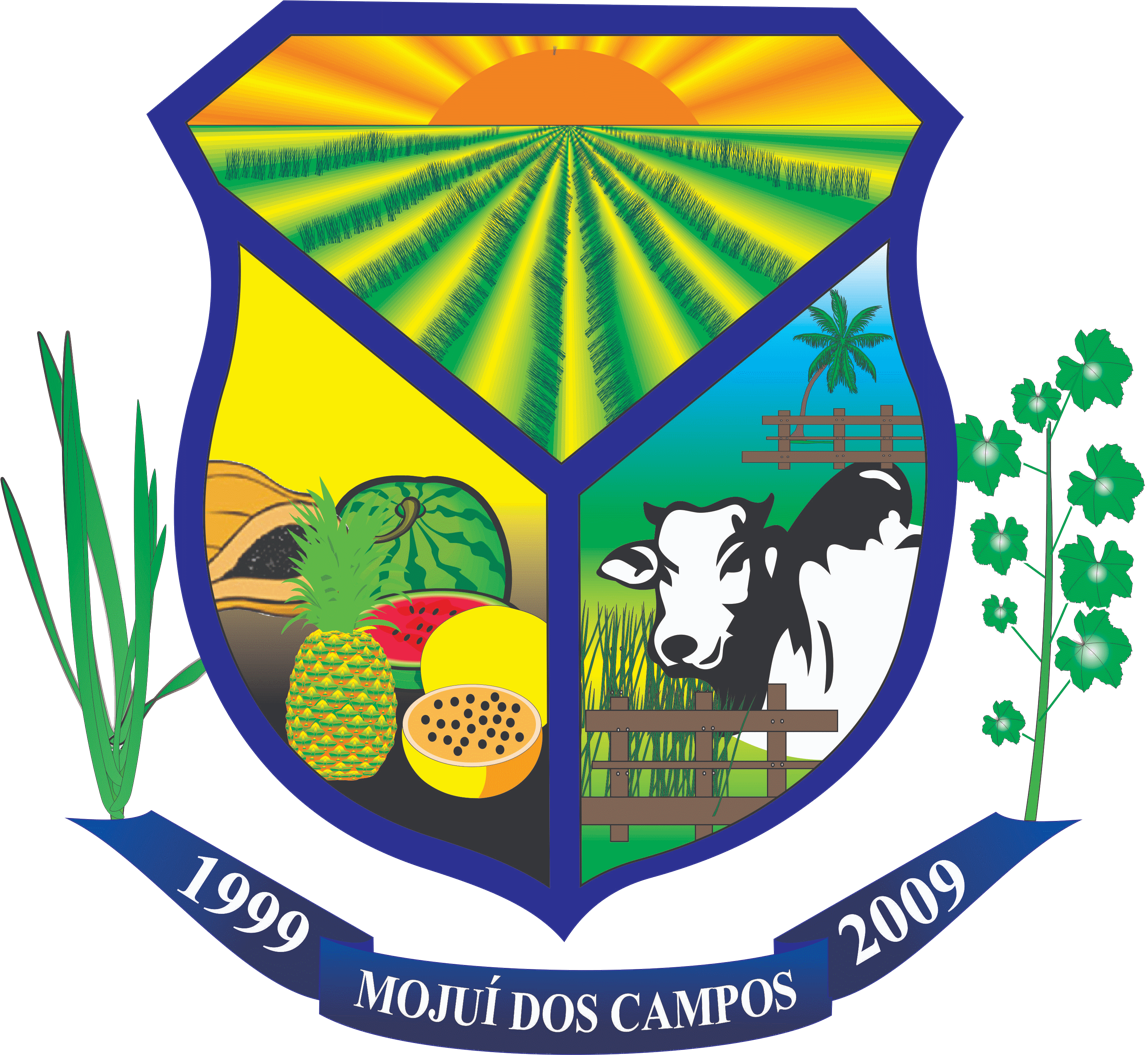
- Flag Coat of arms

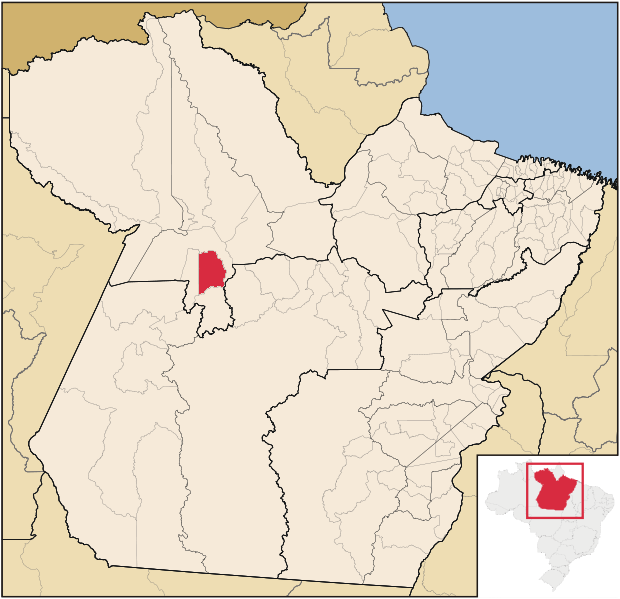
- Location of the Mojuí dos Campos
- Coordinates: 2°41′5″S 54°38′25″W
- Country: Brazil
- Region: Norte
- State: Pará
- Emancipated: January 1, 2013

Government
  - Mayor: Marco Antônio Machado Lima (MDB)

Population (2020)
  - Total: 16,184
- Time zone: UTC−3 (BRT)

Mojuí dos Campos is a municipality in the state of Pará in the Northern region of Brazil. The city had already emancipated from Santarém in 1999, but since that date no municipal elections were run in the city until the 2012 one. Consequently, the city was established on January 1, 2013, with the inauguration of the city's first mayor and councilors.

== See also ==
- List of municipalities in Pará
