= Curuá =

- Municipality
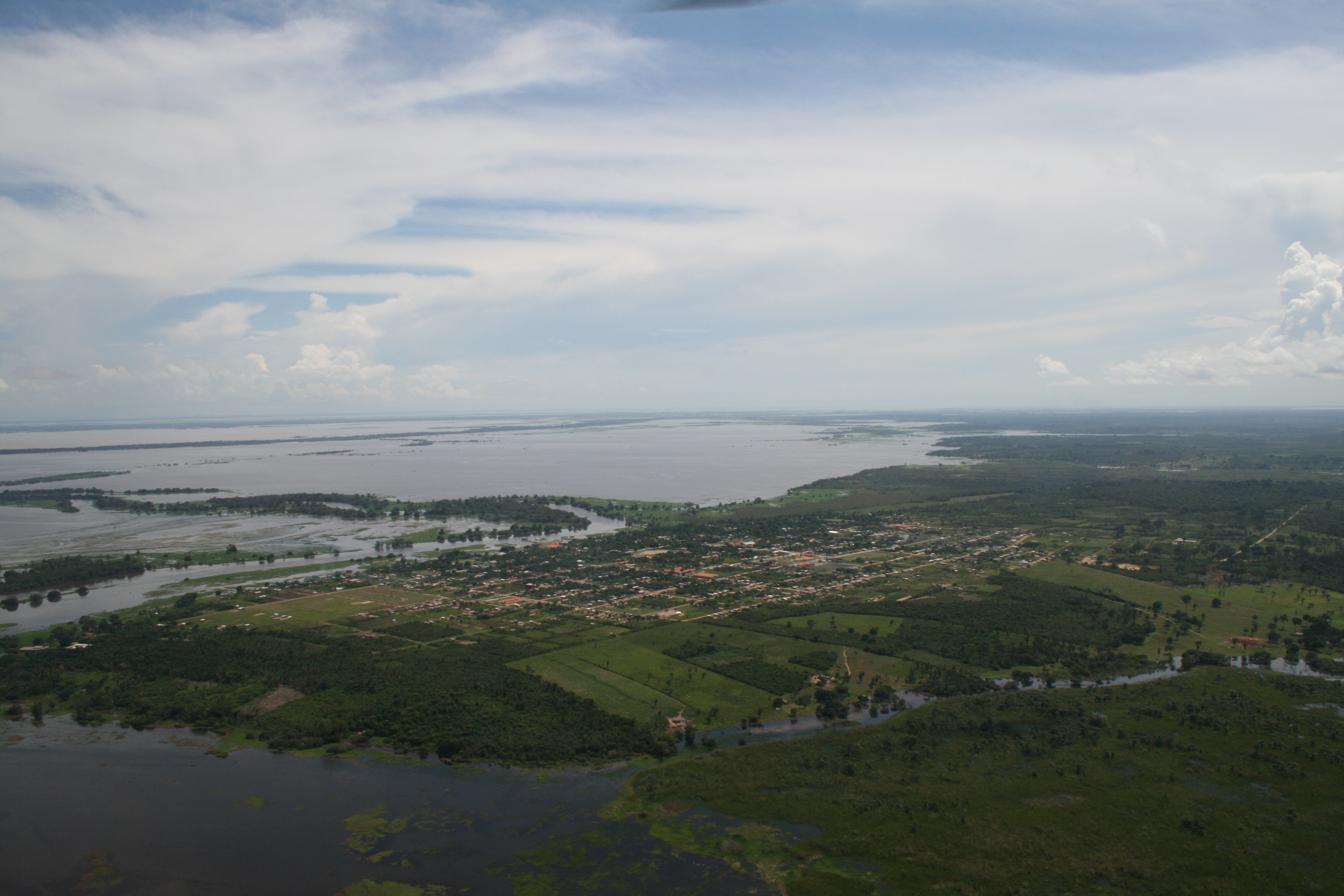

- Flag Coat of arms

- Location in Brazil Curuá (Brazil)
- Coordinates: 1°53′16″S 55°07′01″W
- Country: Brazil
- Region: Northern
- State: Pará
- Mesoregion: Baixo Amazonas

Population (2020)
  - Total: 14,587
- Time zone: UTC−3 (BRT)

Curuá is a municipality in the state of Pará in the Northern region of Brazil.

== See also ==
- List of municipalities in Pará
