= São João do Carú =

Coordinates: 3.55389°S 46.2558°W

- Municipality
- Interactive map of São João do Carú
- Country: Brazil
- Region: Nordeste
- State: Maranhão
- Mesoregion: Oeste Maranhense

Population (2020)
  - Total: 15,787
- Time zone: UTC−3 (BRT)

São João do Carú is a municipality in the state of Maranhão in the Northeast region of Brazil.

== Population ==
Year	Residents
1991	11,341
2000	13,495
2010	15,668
2022	12,251
2025	12,360

== Geography ==
The municipality of São João do Carú has a territorial extension of 910.065 square kilometers, occupying the 110th position among the 217 municipalities of Maranhão in terms of area.

== See also ==
- List of municipalities in Maranhão
