= TV Brasil Maranhão =

São Luís, Maranhão; Brazil
- Channels: Digital: 34; Virtual: 2
- Branding: TV Brasil

Programming
- Affiliations: TV Brasil

Ownership
- Owner: Empresa Brasil de Comunicação; (Instituto Federal do Maranhão)

History
- Founded: December 1, 1969
- Former channel numbers: Analog: 2 (VHF, 1969–2018)

Technical information
- Licensing authority: ANATEL

TV Brasil Maranhão (channel 2) is a TV Brasil-affiliated television station licensed to São Luís, capital of the state of Maranhão. Inaugurated by the state government in 1969, it is one of the oldest educational television stations in Brazil, being administered by Instituto Federal do Maranhão, under the scope of Empresa Brasil de Comunicação.

== History ==
TVE Maranhão launched on December 1, 1969, following the results of a 1968 survey for the implementation of a school television system. The station was created to reduce the state's illiteracy levels, initially, in closed circuit format. Television news production started in 1980.

In 2007, the station was put under the new TV Brasil network. In June 2013, it was responsible for the June events for TV Brasil on a national scale.

On April 9, 2018, Edmilson Filho, who was working for the station for 40 years, died as consequence of a stroke.

On December 10, 2019, EBC announced that it would cease operating the station and would hand its control to IFMA.
