= Nova Esperança do Piriá =

Municipality in Pará, Brazil

Coordinates: 2.26889°S 46.9658°W

- Municipality
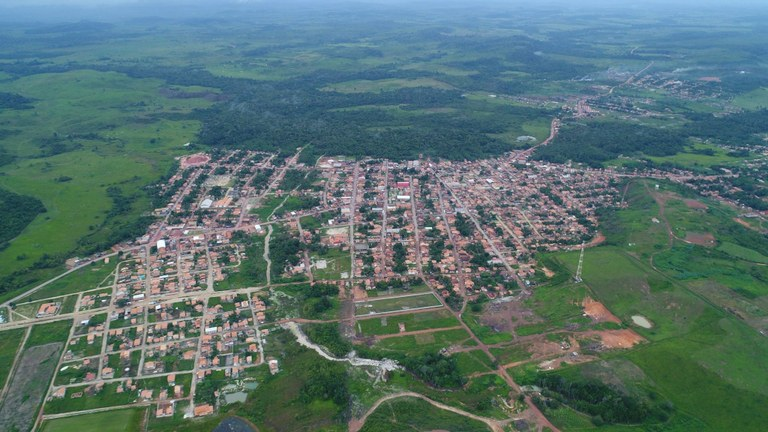
- View of Nova Esperança do Piriá
- Interactive map of Nova Esperança do Piriá
- Country: Brazil
- Region: Northern
- State: Pará
- Mesoregion: Nordeste Paraense

Population (2020)
  - Total: 21,444
- Time zone: UTC−3 (BRT)

Nova Esperança do Piriá (New Hope of Piria) is a municipality in the state of Pará in the Northern region of Brazil.

== See also ==
- List of municipalities in Pará
