= Novo Repartimento =

Municipality in Pará, Brazil

- Municipality
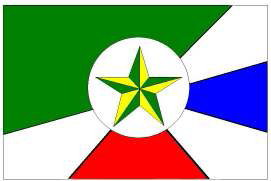
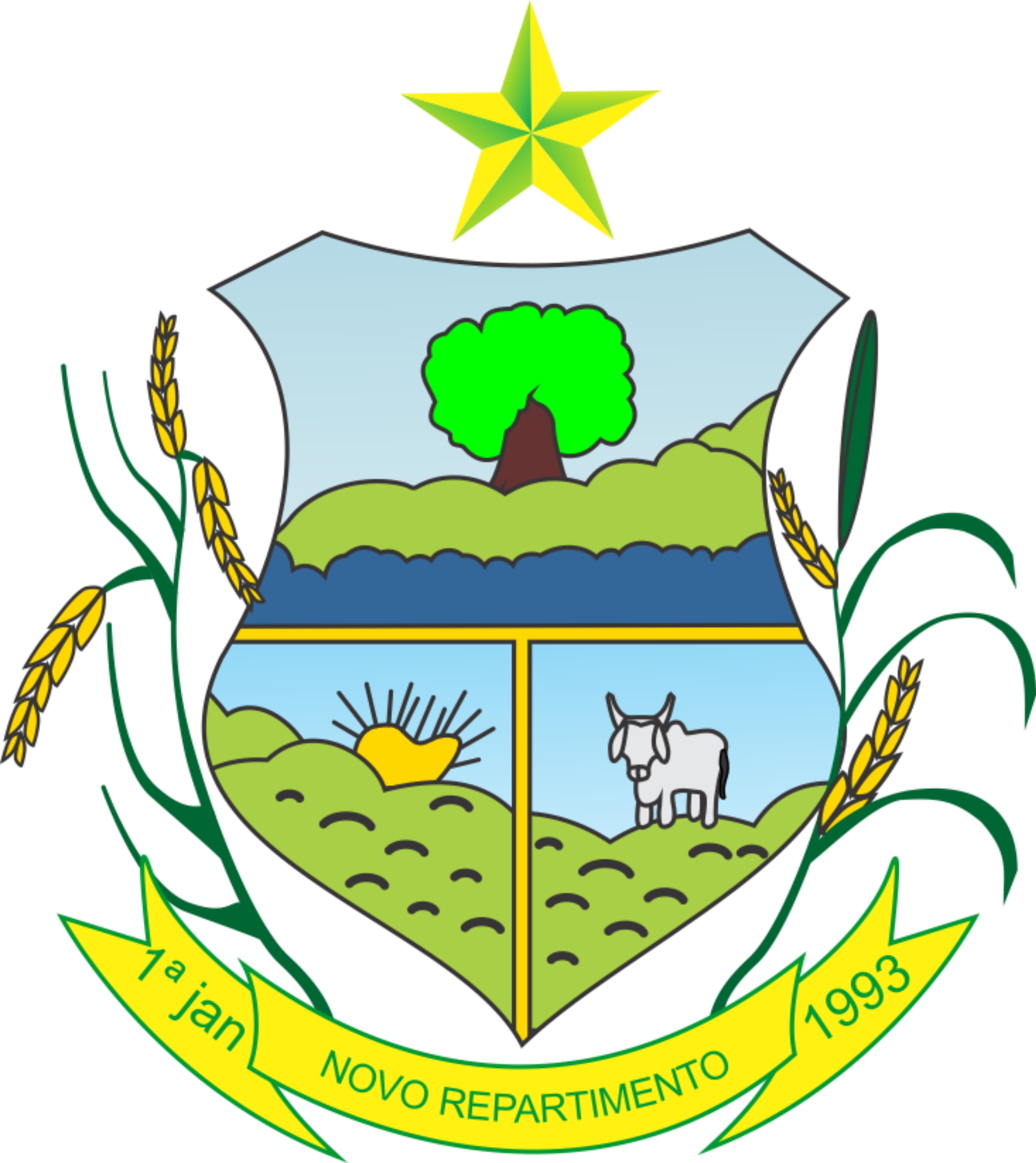
- Flag Coat of arms
- Nickname: Little Princess of the Trans-Amazon
- Location in Pará

- Location in Brazil
- Coordinates: 04°15′04″S 49°56′49″W
- Country: Brazil
- Region: North
- State: Pará
- Mesoregion: Southeastern Pará
- Microregion: Tucuruí
- Founded: 13 December 1991; 34 years ago
- Districts: Novo Repartimento; Belo Monte do Pará; Maracajá; Vitória da Conquista

Government
  - Mayor: Valdir Lemes Machado (PSD)

Area
  - Municipality: 15,398 km^{2} (5,945 sq mi)
  - Urban: 15.42 km^{2} (5.95 sq mi)

Population (2022)
  - Municipality: 60,438
  - Density: 3.9251/km^{2} (10.166/sq mi)
- Demonym: Novo-repartimentense
- Time zone: UTC−3 (BRT)
- Postal code: 68473-000
- Area code: +55 94
- HDI (2010): 0.537 – low
- Website: www.novorepartimento.pa.gov.br

Novo Repartimento is a municipality in the state of Pará, Brazil. It belongs to the mesoregion of Southeastern Pará and to the microregion of Tucuruí. In 2022, its population was 60,438 inhabitants.

== History ==
The village of Repartimento was established on the banks of the Repartimento River in the early 1970s, when its first inhabitant settled near the lodging of the Mendes Júnior construction company, which was in charge for the earthworks on the BR-422 highway that would link the Trans-Amazonian Highway (BR-230) to the Tucuruí dam. The original settlement was located at the intersection of the BR-230 and BR-422 highways, but it was relocated and its population expropriated due to the risk of flooding brought by the lake of the Tucuruí dam.

From 9 to 11 September 1982, more than 3,000 expropriated farmers gathered at the parking lot of the Real Estate Assets Service, which later became the Tucuruí City Hall, to put forward various demands. Their main requests were for larger plots of land, the rebuilding of their homes, and fairer compensation.

On 21 April 1991, a referendum was held calling for the emancipation of Repartimento, with 91.02% of the votes in favour. On 13 December, State Law No. 5,702 elevated the village to the status of municipality, with the name of Novo Repartimento, separating it from Tucuruí, Jacundá and Pacajá.

In 2014, the municipality was divided into four districts: Novo Repartimento, Belo Monte do Pará, Maracajá, and Vitória da Conquista.

== Economy ==
About 90% of the population lives in rural areas, in projects created by the INCRA, and is directly or indirectly linked to agricultural activity. Livestock farming plays a minor role in the economic context and is practised by medium and large producers. In plant extractivism, the most important products are timber and Brazil nuts.

== Education ==
According to the 2010 census, the school enrolment rate for children aged 6 to 14 was 90.9%.

The municipality has 99 primary schools and four secondary schools, located in rural areas and in the town. It also has seven kindergartens in partnership with the Ministry of Education, which provide food, educational and dental services.

== See also ==
- List of municipalities in Pará
