= Rurópolis =

Municipality in Pará, Brazil

Coordinates: 4.09583°S 54.91°W

- Municipality
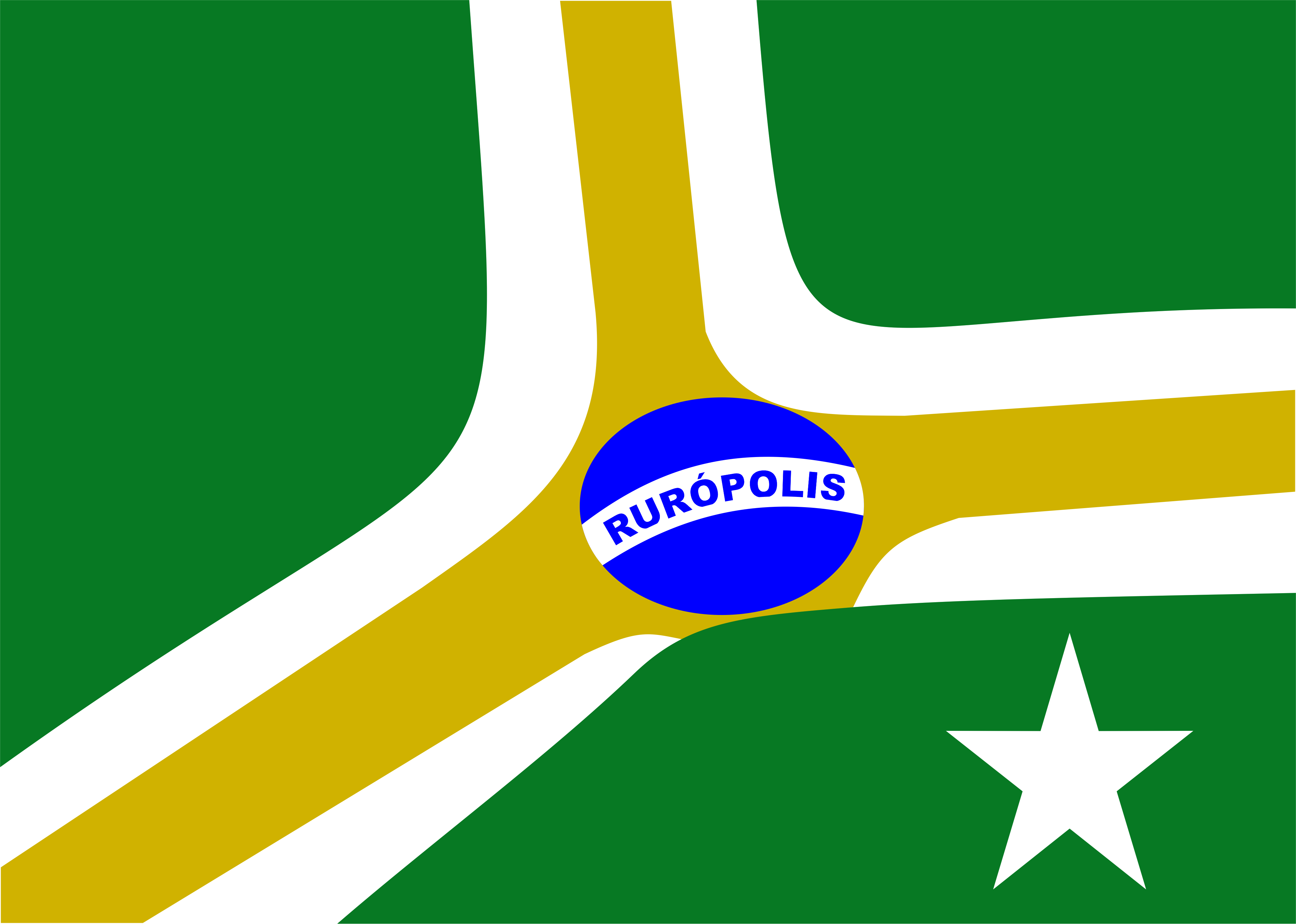
- Flag

- Location in Para

- Location in Brazil
- Country: Brazil
- Region: Northern
- State: Pará
- Mesoregion: Sudoeste Paraense

Population (2020)
  - Total: 51,500
- Time zone: UTC−3 (BRT)

Rurópolis is a municipality in the state of Pará in the Northern region of Brazil.

The municipality contains part of the Trairão National Forest, in which logging is permitted subject to a management plan. It also holds part of the Tapajós National Forest, a 549,067 hectares (1,356,770 acres) sustainable use conservation unit created in 1974.

== See also ==
- List of municipalities in Pará
