= Augusto Corrêa =

Municipality in Pará, Brazil

- Municipality
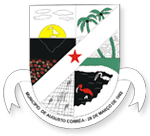
- Flag Coat of arms

- Location in Brazil Augusto Corrêa (Brazil)
- Coordinates: 1.0272°S 46.6446°W
- Country: Brazil
- Region: Northern
- State: Pará
- Mesoregion: Nordeste Paraense

Population (2020)
  - Total: 46,471
- Time zone: UTC−3 (BRT)

Augusto Corrêa is a municipality in the state of Pará in the Northern region of Brazil.

== See also ==
- List of municipalities in Pará
