= Capanema, Pará =

Coordinates: 1°11′45″S 47°10′51″W

CAPANEMA, Pará
- Municipality
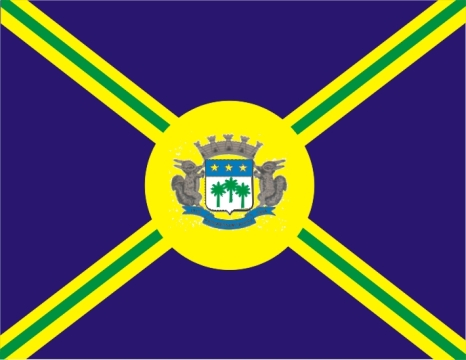
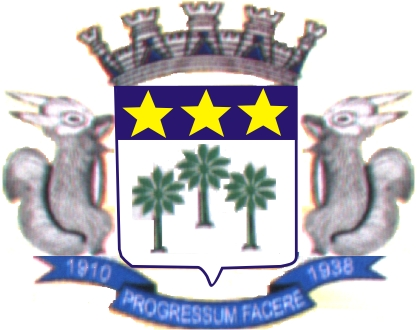
- Flag Coat of arms
- Nicknames: "City of Cement" "City of Pretty Woman"
- Interactive map of CAPANEMA, Pará
- Country: Brazil
- Region: Northern
- State: Pará
- Mesoregion: Nordeste Paraense

Population (2020)
  - Total: 69,431
- Time zone: UTC−3 (BRT)

Capanema, Pará is a municipality in the state of Pará in the Northern region of Brazil.

Capanema is a municipality in the state of Pará. It is located at a latitude 01 ° 11'45 "South and longitude 47 ° 10'51" west, with an altitude of 24 meters. Its population in 2020 was 69,431 inhabitants. The city has influence in the region through trade and services.

== History ==
The origin of the name Capanema dates to the construction of the telegraph network by engineer William Schuch, the Barão de Capanema. He studied engineering at the Polytechnic School of Vienna and returned to Brazil with all the credentials that allowed him to modern scientific training. Under the auspices of the emperor, on May 11, 1852, he founded the National telegraph, of which he was the first and only director. The Capanema river's name was also given in his honor, as it was the river that William Schuch and his team stopped to rest in between work.

== Geography ==
Capanema is situated at a distance of 160 km from Belém on the BR 316 highway. It is the namesake of the immediate region of Capanema, in the northeastern in state of Pará. The city is famous for the cement plant Nassau, the first and largest cement plant in the state. It is the city that has the best economic development of northeastern Pará, as shown by its per capita GDP that is above the regional average. But there are still major problems in local infrastructure, such as paving roads, sewage and water supply.

== Industry ==
The industry in Capanema is not yet consolidated. However it has a remarkable average structure. One of these is the producer of Cement Cibrasa Nassau, a large manufacturing company located in the municipality of Capanema.

== Colleges ==
- Universidade Federal do Pará;
- Faculdade Pan Americana;
- Fatec;
- Unama.

== See also ==
- List of municipalities in Pará

Listagem de Empresas e Serviços de Capanema - Tudo Aqui
