= Bagre, Pará =

Bagre
- Municipality
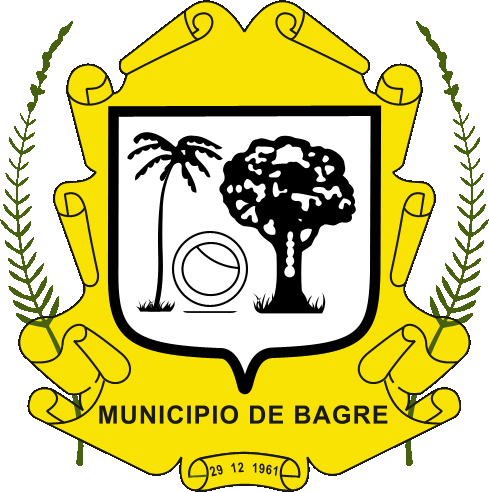
- Flag Coat of arms

- Location in the State of Pará
- Coordinates: 01°54′00″S 50°09′50″W
- Country: Brazil
- Region: North
- State: Pará

Area
  - Total: 4,397.290 km^{2} (1,697.803 sq mi)
- Elevation: 31 m (102 ft)

Population (2020)
  - Total: 31,325
  - Density: 3.1/km^{2} (8.0/sq mi)
- Time zone: UTC−3 (BRT)
- Postal Code: 68475-000
- Website: https://web.archive.org/web/20260312051351/http://www.bagre.pa.gov.br/

Bagre is a Brazilian municipality located in the state of Pará. Its population as of 2020 is estimated to be 31,325 people. The area of the municipality is 4,397.290 km^{2}. The city belongs to the mesoregion Marajó and to the microregion of Portel.

== See also ==
- List of municipalities in Pará
