= Santa Maria das Barreiras =

Santa Maria das Palmas
- Municipality
- Location in Brazil
- Coordinates: 8°51′18″S 49°43′19″W
- Country: Brazil
- Region: Northern
- State: Pará
- Mesoregion: Sudeste Paraense

Population (2020)
  - Total: 21,850
- Time zone: UTC−3 (BRT)

Santa Maria das Barreiras is a municipality in the state of Pará in the Northern region of Brazil.

== See also ==
- List of municipalities in Pará
