= Placas =

Municipality in Pará, Brazil

- Municipality
- Flag Coat of arms

- Location in Brazil Placas (Brazil)
- Coordinates: 3.8674°S 54.2172°W
- Country: Brazil
- Region: Northern
- State: Pará
- Mesoregion: Baixo Amazonas

Population (2020)
  - Total: 31,659
- Time zone: UTC−3 (BRT)

Placas is a municipality in the state of Pará in the Northern region of Brazil.

The municipality holds part of the Tapajós National Forest, a 549,067-hectare (1,356,770-acre) sustainable use conservation unit created in 1974.

== See also ==
- List of municipalities in Pará
