= São Domingos do Araguaia =

Coordinates: 5.53778°S 48.7328°W

- Municipality
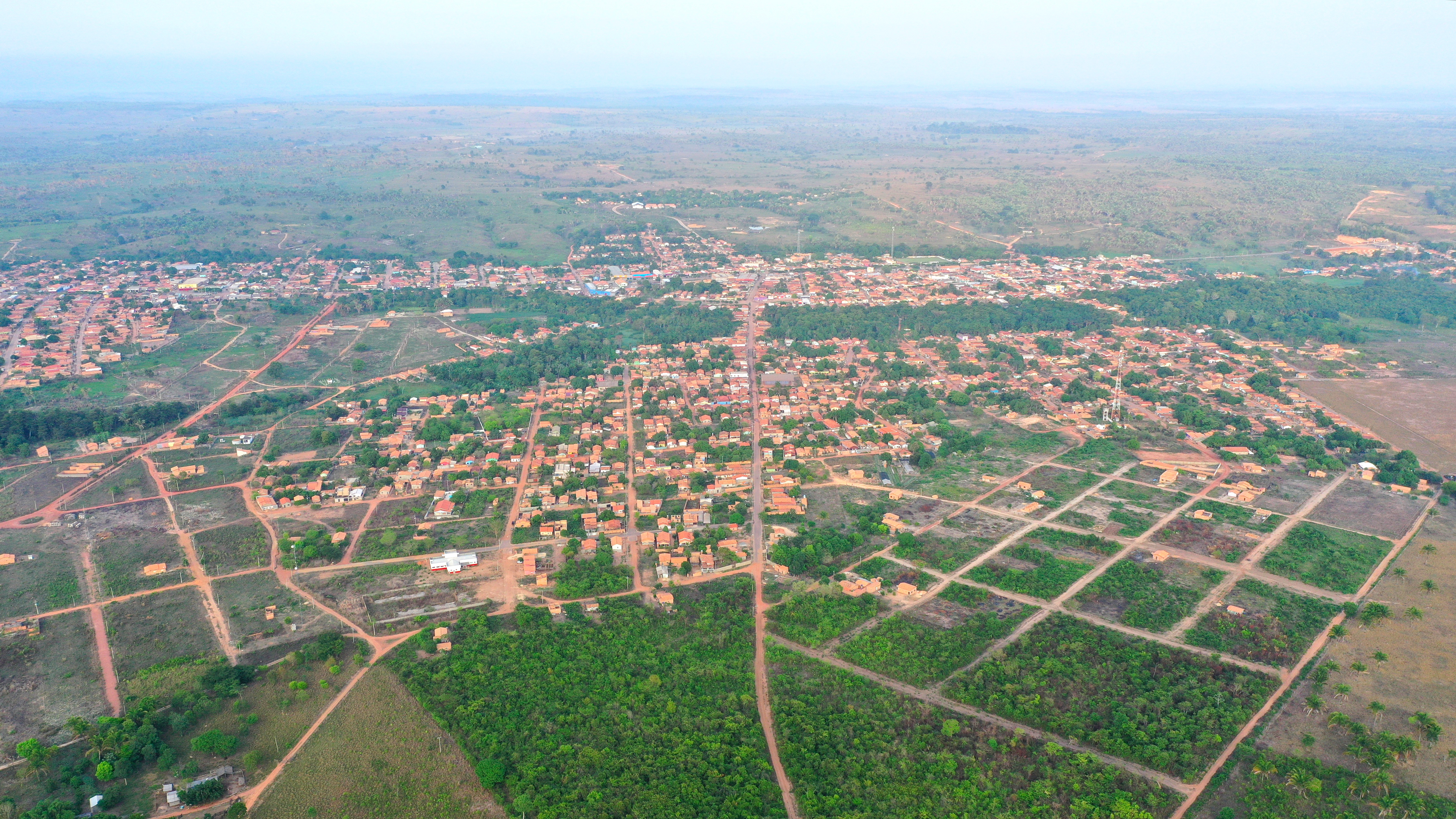
- Aerial photo of São Domingos do Araguaia

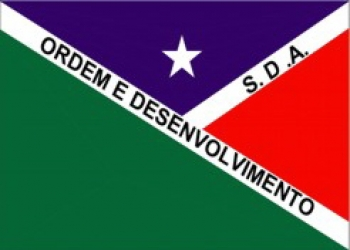
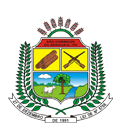
- Flag Coat of arms
- Interactive map of São Domingos do Araguaia
- Country: Brazil
- Region: Northern
- State: Pará
- Mesoregion: Sudeste Paraense

Population (2020)
  - Total: 25,753
- Time zone: UTC−3 (BRT)

São Domingos do Araguaia is a municipality in the state of Pará in the Northern region of Brazil.

== See also ==
- List of municipalities in Pará
