= Mãe do Rio =

Coordinates: 2.06°S 47.5528°W

- Municipality
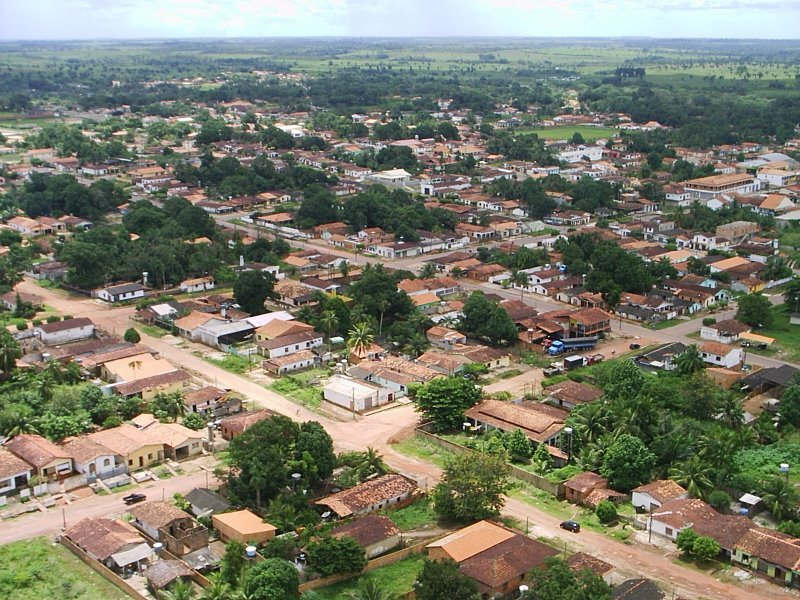

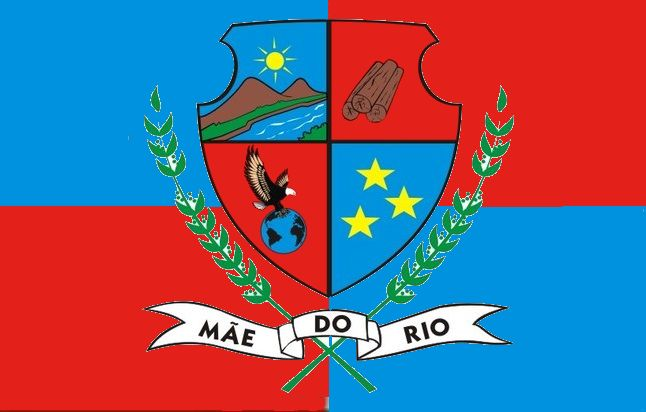
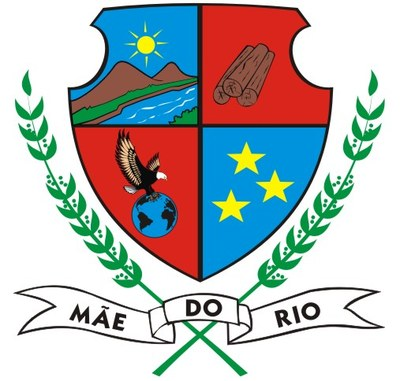
- Flag Coat of arms
- Interactive map of Mãe do Rio
- Country: Brazil
- Region: Northern
- State: Pará
- Mesoregion: Nordeste Paraense

Population (2010)
  - Total: 27,904
- Time zone: UTC−3 (BRT)

Mãe do Rio is a municipality in the state of Pará in the Northern region of Brazil.

== See also ==
- List of municipalities in Pará
