= Prainha, Pará =

Prainha
- Municipality
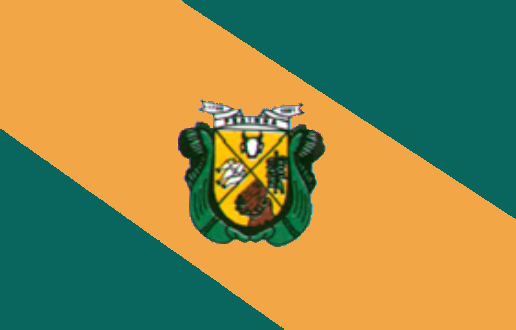
- Flag

- Location in Pará state

- Location in Brazil
- Coordinates: 1°48′0″S 53°28′48″W
- Country: Brazil
- Region: North
- State: Pará

Area
  - Total: 14,787 km^{2} (5,709 sq mi)

Population (2020)
  - Total: 29,846
  - Density: 2.0184/km^{2} (5.2276/sq mi)
- Time zone: UTC−3 (BRT)

Prainha is a municipality in the state of Pará in Brazil. The population is 29,846 (2020 est.) in an area of 14,787 km^{2}. The elevation is 70 m. It is located on the Amazon River.

== See also ==
- List of municipalities in Pará
