= Senador José Porfírio =

Coordinates: 2°35′S 51°55′W

- Municipality
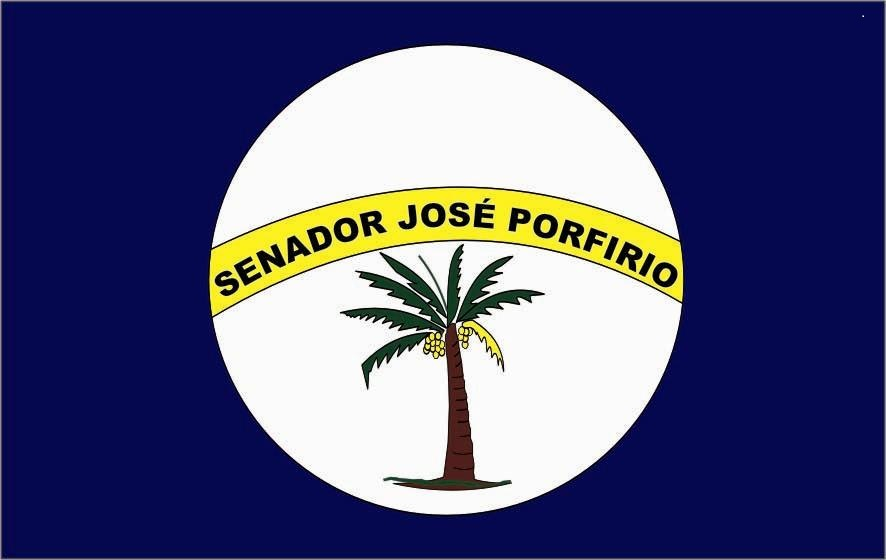
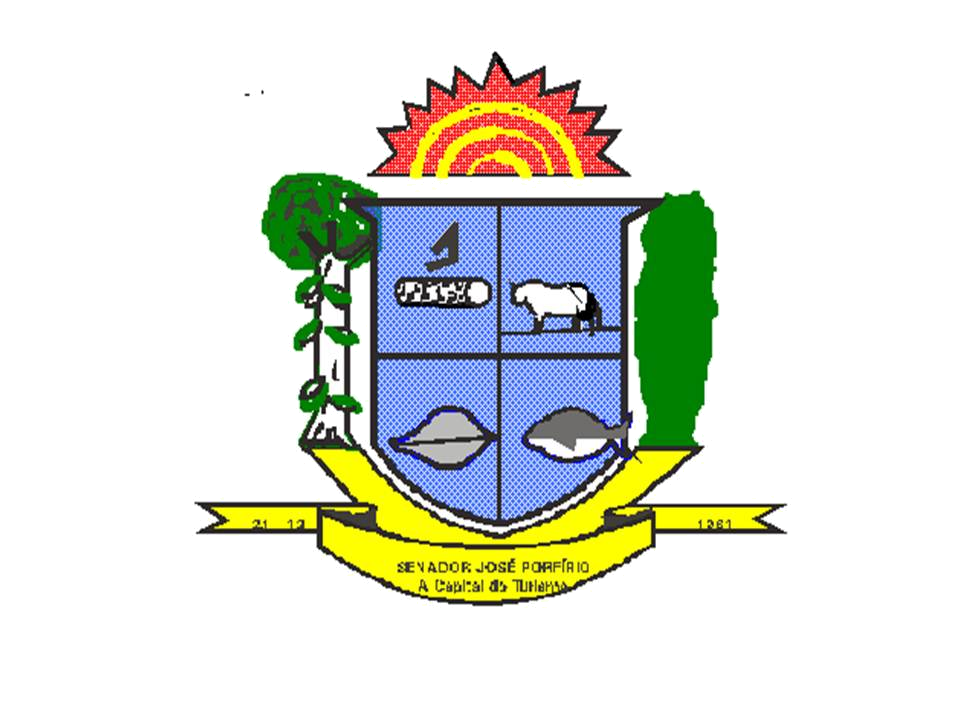
- Flag Coat of arms

- Location of the municipality within the state of Pará
- Country: Brazil
- Region: Northern
- State: Pará
- Mesoregion: Sudoeste Paraense

Area
  - Total: 5,549.867 sq mi (14,374.090 km^{2})

Population (2020)
  - Total: 11,480
  - Density: 2.069/sq mi (0.7987/km^{2})
- Time zone: UTC−3 (BRT)

Senador José Porfírio is a municipality in the state of Pará in the Northern region of Brazil.

== See also ==
- List of municipalities in Pará
