= Capitão Poço =

Coordinates: 1°45′S 47°05′W

- Municipality
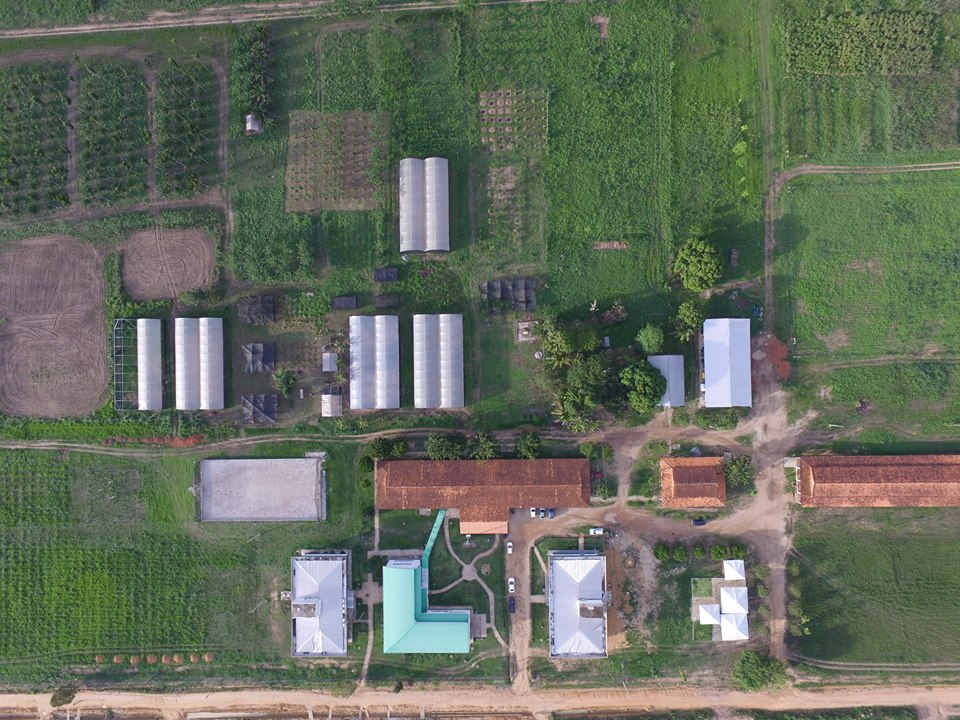
- Campus of the Federal Rural University of Amazonia

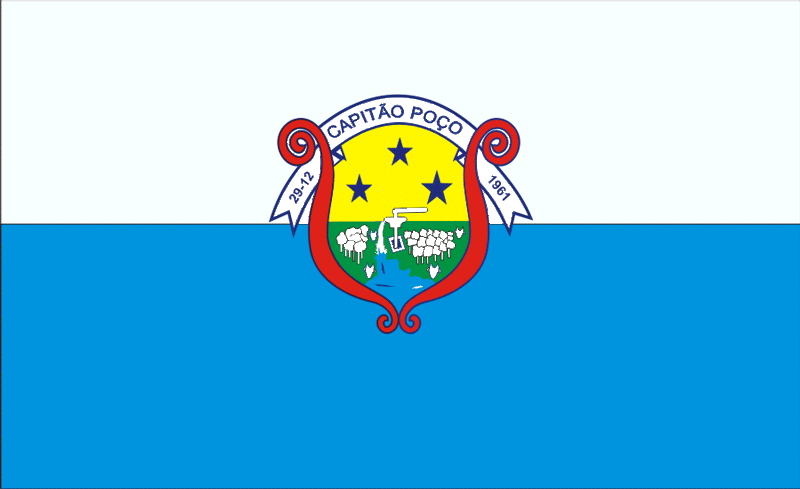
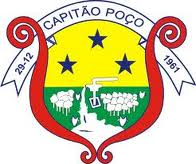
- Flag Coat of arms
- Interactive map of Capitão Poço
- Country: Brazil
- Region: Northern
- State: Pará
- Mesoregion: Nordeste Paraense

Population (2020)
  - Total: 54,425
- Time zone: UTC−3 (BRT)
- Website: Official website

Capitão Poço is a municipality in the state of Pará in the Northern region of Brazil. Known as "Land of Orange" due to its large production of this fruit. The municipality exports orange and other fruits and spices for the international market. There are many rivers around the city.

Its colonization started in the 40s and getting the title of emancipation in 1961. Currently the city has great influence in the neighboring cities.

== See also ==
- List of municipalities in Pará
