= Floresta do Araguaia =

- Municipality
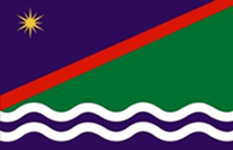
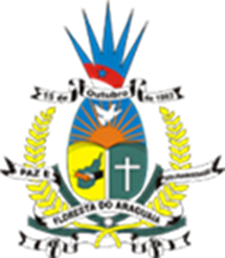
- Flag Coat of arms

- Location in Brazil
- Coordinates: 7°33′14″S 49°42′46″W
- Country: Brazil
- Region: Northern
- State: Pará
- Mesoregion: Sudeste Paraense

Population (2020)
  - Total: 20,525
- Time zone: UTC−3 (BRT)

Floresta do Araguaia is a municipality in the state of Pará in the Northern region of Brazil.

== See also ==
- List of municipalities in Pará
