= Pacajá =

Municipality in Pará, Brazil

Coordinates: 3.83778°S 50.6378°W

- Municipality
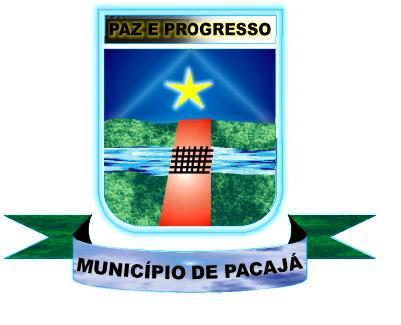
- Flag Coat of arms

- Country: Brazil
- Region: Northern
- State: Pará
- Mesoregion: Sudoeste Paraense

Population (2020)
  - Total: 48,414
- Time zone: UTC−3 (BRT)

Pacajá is a municipality in the state of Pará in the Northern region of Brazil.

== See also ==
- List of municipalities in Pará
