= Brasil Novo =

Coordinates: 3.26194°S 52.6678°W

- Municipality
- Interactive map of Brasil Novo
- Country: Brazil
- Region: Northern
- State: Pará
- Mesoregion: Sudoeste Paraense

Population (2020)
  - Total: 14,983
- Time zone: UTC−3 (BRT)

Brasil Novo is a municipality in the state of Pará in the Northern region of Brazil.

== See also ==
- List of municipalities in Pará
