= Medicilândia =

Municipality in Pará, Brazil

Coordinates: 3.44583°S 52.8889°W

- Municipality
- Interactive map of Medicilândia
- Country: Brazil
- Region: Northern
- State: Pará
- Mesoregion: Sudoeste Paraense

Population (2020)
  - Total: 31,975
- Time zone: UTC−3 (BRT)

Medicilândia is a municipality in the state of Pará in the Northern region of Brazil.

== See also ==
- List of municipalities in Pará
