= List of quilombola communities in Pará =

The following is a list of remaining quilombo communities and territories located in the Brazilian state of Pará. The listing of quilombos is provided for by the Brazilian Constitution of 1988, and certification by the Fundação Cultural Palmares (FCP) is sufficient :

Art. 216. Brazilian cultural heritage constitutes assets of a material and immaterial nature, taken individually or together, bearing references to the identity, action, memory of the different groups forming Brazilian society [...] § 5 All are listed documents and sites holding historical reminiscences of the former quilombos.

Each community has a Technical Identification and Delimitation Report (RTID) published in the Official Gazette of the Union. This is a stage in the land regularization process ensuring the right to your land, prepared by a Technical Group appointed by the National Institute of Colonization and Agrarian Reform (INCRA).

Traditional Peoples or Traditional Communities are groups that have a culture different from the local predominant culture, which maintain a way of life closely linked to the natural environment in which they live. Through its own forms: social organization, use of territory and natural resources (with a relationship to subsistence ), its socio-cultural-religious reproduction uses knowledge transmitted orally and in everyday practice.

== List ==
Municípiality	Community	Recognition by Palmares Cultural lFoundation
Oriximiná	Aracuã de Cima	2013
Ananindeua	Abacatal-Aurá	2012
Oriximiná	Abuí	2013
Acará	Alto Acará	2013
Gurupá	Alto Ipixuna	2004
Gurupá	Alto Pucuruí	2004
Oriximiná	Alto Trombetas	2013
Santarém	Arapemã	2004
Óbidos	Arapucu	2007
Óbidos	Ariramba	2006
Gurupá	Bacá do Ipixuna	2004
Salvaterra	Bacabal	2012
Oeiras do Pará and Baião	Bailique	2010
Salvaterra	Bairro Alto	2010
Inhangapi	Bandeira Branca	2007
Cachoeira do Piriá	Bela Aurora	2004
Oriximiná	Boa Vista	2013
Santa Izabel do Pará	Boa Vista do Itá	2006
Moju	Bom Jesus Centro Ouro, Nossa Senhora das Graças and São Bernadinho	2013
Irituia	Bracinho	2006
Óbidos	Cabeceiras (São José, Silêncio, Mata, Cuecê, Apui and Castanhaduba)	2013
Colares	Cacau	2005
Oriximiná	Cachoeira Porteira	2007
Moju	Cacoal and Divino Espirito Santos	2014
Abaetetuba	Caeté	2013
Cachoeira do Piriá	Camiranga	2006
Salvaterra	Campina	2004
Irituia	Campo Alegre	2006
Concórdia do Pará	Campo Verde	2010
Gurupá	Camutá do Ipixuna	2004
Irituia	Candeua	identificada
Acará	Carananduba	2013
Gurupá	Carrazedo	2004
Garrafão do Norte	Castanhalzinho	2013
Poconé	Céu Azul	2005
Tracuateua	Cigano	2013
Salvaterra	Cristã de Baleiro	processo aberto
Óbidos	Cuecé	2017
Inhangapi	Cumaru	2006
Oriximiná	Curaçá	2013
Garrafão do Norte	Cutuvelo	2013
Bonito	Cuxiú	2013
Salvaterra	Deus Ajude	2010
Concórdia do Pará	Dona	2010
Gurupá	Flexinha	2004
Tomé-Açu	Forte do Castelo	2014
Baião	Fugido Rio	2004
Acará	Guarajá Miri	2012
Cachoeira de Arari	Gurupá	2004
Gurupá	Gurupá-Mirim	2004
Concórdia do Pará	Igarapé	2010
Abaetetuba	Igarapé do Vilar	identificada
Oeiras do Pará, Baião and Mocajuba	Igarapé Preto and Baixinha (Igarapé Preto, Baixinha, Panpelônia, Teófilo, Varzinha, Campelo, Cupu, França, Araquembáua, Carará, Costeiro and Igarapezinho)	2013
Óbidos	Igarapé-Açu	2007
Abaetetuba	Ilhas de Abaetetuba (Alto and Baixo Itacuruçá, Campopema, Jenipaúba, Acaraqui, Igarapé São João, Arapapu, Rio Tauaré-Açú)	2012
Concórdia do Pará	Ipanema	2010
São Domingos do Capim	Ipixuninha	identificada
Inhangapi	Itabóca, Cocal and Quatro Bocas	2007
Cachoeira do Piriá	Itamoari	2013
Santa Izabel do Pará	Jacarequara	2006
Oriximiná	Jamari	2013
Moju	Jambuaçu	2006
Gurupá	Jocojó	2004
Oriximiná	Juquirizinho	2013
Oriximiná	Juquri Grande	2013
Tracuateua	Jurussaca	2013
Abaetetuba	Laranjituba and África	2013
Santa Luzia do Pará	Macapazinho	2006
Gurupá	Maria Ribeira	2004
Cametá	Matias	2013
Irituia	Medianeira das Graças	2006
Acará	Menino Jesus	2012
Inhangapi	Menino Jesus de Petimandeua	2015
Ourém	Mocambo	2013
Moju	Moju-Miri	2013
Óbidos	Mondongo	2007
Oriximiná	Moura	2013
Óbidos	Muratubinha	2007
Santarém	Murumuru	2005
Capitão Poço	Narcisa	2005
Concórdia do Pará	Nossa Senhora da Conceição Caruperê	2006
Concórdia do Pará	Nossa Senhora da Conceição Ipanema	2006
Óbidos	Nossa Senhora das Graças	2007
Concórdia do Pará	Nossa Senhora das Graças Vila do Cravo	2006
São Miguel do Guamá	Nossa Senhora de Fátima do Crauateua	2013
Irituia	Nossa Senhora do Carmo do Igarapé da Ponte	2006
Igarapé-Açu and Nova Timboteua	Nossa Senhora do Livramento	2013
Concórdia do Pará	Nossa Senhora do Perpétuo Socorro	2006
Irituia	Nossa Senhora do Perpétuo Socorro da Montanha	2006
Irituia	Nova Laudicéia	2007
Santarém	Nova Vista do Ituqui	2005
Acará	Outeiro and Tracuateua	identificada
Colares	Ovos	2005
Moju	Oxalá de Jacunday	2013
Viseu	Paca and Aningal	2004
Salvaterra	Paixão	2016
Oriximiná	Palhal	2013
Oriximiná / Óbidos	Pancada, Araça, EspíritoSanto, Jauari, Boa Vista do Cuminá, Varre Vento, Jaruacá and Acapu	2013
Oriximiná	Paraná do Abuí	2017
Baião	Paritá Miri	2007
Moju	Passagem	2006
Santarém	Patos do Ituqui	2013
Salvaterra	Pau Furado	2010
Monte Alegre	Peafú	2006
Óbidos	Peruana	2007
Santa Luzia do Pará	Pimenteiras	2006
Amarante	Piripiri	identificada
Cametá	Porto Alegre	2013
Mocajuba	Porto Grande, Mangabeira, São Benedito de Viseu, Santo Antônio de Viseu, Uxizal, Vizânia and Ibatinga	2013
Salvaterra	Providência	2016
Abaetetuba	Ramal do Bacuri	2013
Abaetetuba	Ramal do Piratuba	2013
Moju	Ribeira do Jambu-Açu	2013
Abaetetuba	Rio Tauera-Açú	processo aberto
Salvaterra	Rosário	2006
Salvaterra	Salvá	2016
Abaetetuba	Samauma	2013
Moju	Santa Ana do Baixo Jambuaçu	2013
Baião	Santa Fé and Santo Antônio	2013
Salvaterra	Santa Luzia	2006
Moju	Santa Luzia do Bom Prazer	2014
Moju	Santa Luzia do Tracuateua	2013
Acará	Santa Maria de Itacoã Mirim	2011
Irituia	Santa Maria do Curaçá	2006
Moju	Santa Maria do Mirindeua	2006
Moju	Santa Maria Traquateua	2013
Acará	Santa Quitéria and Itacoãzinho	2010
São Miguel do Guamá	Santa Rita de Barreiras	2011
Irituia	Santa Terezinha	2006
Ponta de Pedras	Santana do Arari	2013
Concórdia do Pará	Santo Antonio	2006
Gurupá	Santo Antônio Camutá do Ipixuna	2004
Moju	Santo Cristo do Ipitinga do Mirindeua	2013
Salvaterra	São Benedito da Ponta	2010
Irituia	São Francisco do Maracaxeta	2007
Gurupá	São Francisco Médio do Ipixuna	2004
Irituia	São José da Boa Vista	identificada
Curralinho	São José da Povoação do Rio Mutuacá	2013
Irituia	São José do Açaiteua	2006
Baião and Mocajuba	São José do Icatu	2011
Santarém	São José do Ituqui	2005
Curralinho	São José do Mutuaca	identificada
Irituia	São José do Patauateua	2007
Bujaru	São Judas Tadeu	2006
Irituia	São Miguel Arcanjo	identificada
Tomé-Açu	São Pedro	2011
Castanhal	São Pedro-Bacuri	2007
Santarém	São Raimundo do Ituqui	2005
Moju	São Sebastião	2013
Santarém	Saracura	2004
São Domingos do Capim	Sauá Mirim	identificada
Salvaterra	Siricarí	2011
Moju	Sucurijuquara	2014
Mocajuba	Tambai-Açu	2012
São Domingos do Capim	Taperinha	identificada
Ponta de Pedras	Tartarugueiro	2013
Bagre	Tatituquara, São Sebastião, Ajará and Boa Esperança	2013
Colares	Terra Amarela	2013
Concórdia do Pará	Timboteua Cravo	2006
Santarém	Tiningu	2004
Santa Luzia do Pará	Tipitinga	2006
Santa Luzia do Pará	Três Voltas	2013
Oriximiná	Último Erepecú	2013
Baião	Umarizal Beira	2007
Prainha	União São João	2010
São Domingos do Capim	Unidos do Rio Capim	2011
Concórdia do Pará	Velho Expedito	2006
Abaetetuba	Vila Dutra / Calados and Cardoso	processo aberto
Viseu	Vila Mariana	2006
Salvaterra	Vila União / Campina	2006

== Quilombola territories ==
Quilombola territories titled or in the process of being titled in Pará.
quilombola land	Communities	County	State	Issuing body	Families	Claimed area (ha)	Title Size (ha)	Title date	Notes
Abacatal - Aurá	Abacatal - Aurá	Ananindeua	Pará	Iterpa	53	583.2838	317,9366	13/05/1999	
Abacatal - Aurá	Abacatal - Aurá	Ananindeua	Pará	Iterpa	53	583.2838	265,3472	02/12/2008	
Água Fria	Água Fria	Oriximiná	Pará	Incra	15	557.1355	557.1355	20/11/1996	
Alto Acará	Alto Acará	Acará	Pará	Iterpa	102	12.409,4000	12.409,4000	13/09/2022	
Alto Trombetas	Abuí, Paraná do Abuí, Santo Antônio do Abuizinho, Sacred Heart, Tapagem, Mãe Cué	Oriximin	Pará	ITERPA	155	79,095.5912	79,095.5912	20/11/2003	
Ariramba	Ariramba	Óbidos	Pará	Iterpa	27	10.454,5619	10.454,5619	18/06/2018	
Bailique	Bailique Beira, Bailique Centro, Poção and São Bernardo	Oeiras do Pará and Baião	Pará	ITERPA	112	7297.69	7297.69	19/07/2002	
Bela Aurora	Bela Aurora	Cachoeira do Piriá	Pará	INCRA	32	2.410,2754	2.410,2754	14/12/2004	
Boa Vista	Boa Vista	Oriximiná	Pará	Incra	112	1.125,0341	1.125,0341	20/11/1995	
Cabeceiras	São José, Silêncio, Mata, Cuecê, Apui e Castanhaduba	Óbidos	Pará	FCP	445	17.189,6939	17.189,6939	08/05/2000	
Cachoeira Porteira	Cachoeira Porteira	Oriximiná	Pará	ITERPA	189	225.175,9420	225.175,9420	28/02/2018	
Camiranga	Camiranga	Cachoeira do Piriá	Pará	ITERPA	39	320,6121	320,6121	16/01/2002	
Campo Verde, Igarapé Dona, Ipanema and Santo Antônio (ARQUINEC)	Campo Verde, Igarapé Dona, Ipanema and Santo Antônio (ARQUINEC)	Concórdia do Pará	Pará	Incra	180	5.981,3412	5.981,3412	25/08/2010	
Caranduba	Caranduba	Acará	Pará	ITERPA	33	644,5477	644,5477	23/11/2006	
Castanhalzinho	Castanhalzinho	Garrafão do Norte	Pará	ITERPA	62	291,0781	291,0781	20/06/2015	
Centro Ouro	Centro Ouro, Nossa Senhora das Graças e São Bernardino	Mojú	Pará	ITERPA	123	5.243,1409	5.243,1409	23/11/2006	
Cutuvelo	Cutuvelo	Garrafão do Norte	Pará	ITERPA	47	497,1703	497,1703	20/06/2015	
Cuxiu	Cuxiu	Bonito, São Miguel do Guamá e Ourém	Pará	ITERPA	35	353,0204	353,0204	16/11/2021	
Erepecuru	Pancada, Araçá, Espírito Santo, Jauari, Boa Vista do Cuminá, Varre Vento, Jarauacá and Acapú	Oriximiná e Óbidos	Pará	INCRA	154	231.610,2940	71.150,8867	08/12/1998	
Erepecuru	Pancada, Araçá, Espírito Santo, Jauari, Boa Vista do Cuminá, Varre Vento, Jarauacá and Acapú	Oriximiná e Óbidos	Pará	ITERPA	154	231.610,2940	160.459,4072	12/05/2000	
Espítiro Santo	Espítiro Santo	Acará	Pará	ITERPA	25	276,1594	276,1594	28/02/2018	
Guajará Miri	Guajará Miri	Acará	Pará	ITERPA	70	1.024,1954	1.024,1954	26/11/2002	
Guajarauna	Baixo Guajarauna, Cacoal, Divino Espírito Santo, Fazenda e Cinco reis	Abaetetuba e Moju	Pará	ITERPA	46	1.368,3736	1.368,3736	10/05/2022	
Gurupá	Gurupá Mirin, Jocojó, Flexinha, Carrazedo, Camutá do Ipixuna, Bacá do Ipixuna, Alto Ipixuna e Alto Pucuruí	Gurupá	Pará	Iterpa	300	83.437,1287	83.437,1287	20/07/2000	
Igarapé Preto	Araquenbaua, Baixinha, Campelo, Carará, Costeiro, Cupu, França, Igarapé Preto, Igarapezinho, Panpelônia, Teófilo, Varzinha	Baião	Pará	Iterpa	565	17,357	17,357	29/09/2002	
Ilhas de Abaetetuba	Bom Remédio	Abaetetuba	Pará	ITERPA	116	588,1670	588,1670	05/05/2002	
Ilhas de Abaetetuba	Alto Itacuruça, Baixo Itacuruça, Jenipaúba, Acaraqui, Igarapé São João, Arapapu, Rio Tauaré-Açu, Arapapuzinho e Rio Ipanema	Abaetetuba	Pará	ITERPA	701	9.076,1909	9.076,1909	05/06/2002	
Ilha Grande do Cupijó	Ilha Grande do Cupijó	Cametá	Pará	ITERPA	75	1.922,6471	1.922,6471	28/04/2017	
Itaboca-Quatro Bocas and Cacoal	Itaboca-Quatro Bocas and Cacoal	Inhangapi	Pará	ITERPA	84	446,6848	446,6848	17/12/2010	
Itamoari	Itamoari	Cachoeira do Piriá	Pará	Incra	33	5.377,6028	5.377,6028	07/09/1998	
Itacoã Miri	Itacoã Miri	Acará	Pará	ITERPA	96	968,9932	968,9932	20/11/2003	
Jacarequara	Jacarequara	Santa Luzia do Pará	Pará	ITERPA	55	1.236,9910	1.236,9910	13/05/2008	
Jacunday	Jacunday	Mojú	Pará	ITERPA	60	1.701,5887	1.701,5887	23/11/2006	
Juquiri	Juquiri	Moju	Pará	Iterpa	65	698,2962	698,2962	29/06/2022	
Jurussaca	Jurussaca	Traquateua	Pará	ITERPA	45	200,9875	200,9875	14/09/2002	
Laranjituba/Africa	Laranjituba/Africa	Mojú	Pará	ITERPA	48	1.226,2278	118,0441	04/12/2001	
Laranjituba/Africa	Laranjituba/Africa	Mojú	Pará	ITERPA	48	1.226,2278	1.108,1837	02/12/2008	
Macapazinho	Macapazinho	Santa Isabel do Pará	Pará	ITERPA	33	91,1505	91,1505	13/05/2008	
Maria Ribeira	Maria Ribeira	Gurupá	Pará	Iterpa	32	2.031,8727	2.031,8727	20/11/2000	
Matias	Matias	Cametá	Pará	Iterpa	45	1.424,6701	1.424,6701	13/05/2008	
Menino Jesus	Menino Jesus	São Miguel do Guamá	Pará	Iterpa	12	288,9449	288,9449	13/05/2008	
Mocambo	Mocambo	Ourém	Pará	Iterpa	102	657,6820	657,6820	13/11/2012	
Moju-Miri	Moju-Miri	Moju	Pará	Iterpa	28	878,6388	878,6388	02/12/2008	
Muruteuazinho	Muruteuazinho	Santa Luzia do Pará	Pará	Iterpa	38	628,4249	628,4249	04/09/2013	
Narcisa	Narcisa	Capitão Poço	Pará	INCRA	7	618,9320	120,0530	14/11/2002	Current title is 19% of claimed area
Nossa Senhora da Conceição	Nossa Senhora da Conceição	Moju	Pará	Iterpa	54	2.393,0559	2.393,0559	20/11/2005	
Nossa Senhora do Livramento	Nossa Senhora do Livramento	Igarapé-Açu e Nova Timboteua	Pará	Iterpa	53	128,9332	128,9332	06/05/2010	
Nossa Senhora de Fátima de Crauateua	Nossa Senhora de Fátima de Crauateua	São Miguel do Guamá	Pará	ITERPA	61	495,4909	495,4909	19/11/2020	
Paca e Aningal	Paca e Aningal	Viseu	Pará	Incra	22	1.284,2398	1.284,2398	14/12/2004	
Pacoval de Alenquer	Pacoval	Alenquer	Pará	Incra	115	7.472,8790	7.472,8790	20/11/1996	
Pérolá do Maicá	Pérolá do Maicá	Santarém	Pará	PM Santarém	16	3,1522	1,3894	20/09/2018	Current title is 73% of claimed area
Pérolá do Maicá	Pérolá do Maicá	Santarém	Pará	PM Santarém	16	3,1522	0,3250	20/09/2018	Current title is 73% of claimed area
Pérolá do Maicá	Pérolá do Maicá	Santarém	Pará	PM Santarém	16	3,1522	0,4501	20/09/2018	Current title is 73% of claimed area
Pérolá do Maicá	Pérolá do Maicá	Santarém	Pará	PM Santarém	16	3,1522	0,0296	16/10/2019	Current title is 73% of claimed area
Pérolá do Maicá	Pérolá do Maicá	Santarém	Pará	PM Santarém	16	3,1522	0,0634	16/10/2019	Current title is 73% of claimed area
Pérolá do Maicá	Pérolá do Maicá	Santarém	Pará	PM Santarém	16	3,1522	0,0356	16/10/2019	Current title is 73% of claimed area
Peruana	Peruana	Óbidos	Pará	INCRA	16	1.945,5300	1.945,5300	26/10/2018	
Petimandeua	Petimandeua	Inhangapi	Pará	Iterpa	55	302,073	302,073	09/01/2023	
Porto Alegre	Porto Alegre	Cametá	Pará	Iterpa	54	2.858,7114	2.858,7114	20/11/2007	
Ramal do Bacuri	Ramal do Bacuri	Abaetetuba	Pará	ITERPA	135	911,8576	911,8576	27/06/2022	
Ramal do Piratuba	Ramal do Piratuba	Abaetetuba	Pará	ITERPA	176	959,8167	959,8167	17/12/2010	
Ribeira do Jambu-Açu	Ribeira do Jambu-Açu	Moju	Pará	Iterpa	62	1.303,5089	1.303,5089	02/12/2008	
Samaúma	Samaúma	Abaetetuba	Pará	ITERPA	12	213,0550	213,0550	02/12/2008	
Santa Fe e Santo Antônio	Santa Fe e Santo Antônio	Baião	Pará	ITERPA	28	830,8776	830,8776	29/09/2002	
Santa Luzia do Traquateua	Santa Luzia do Traquateua	Moju	Pará	Iterpa	32	342,3018	342,3018	30/11/2009	
Santa Maria do Mirindeua	Santa Maria do Mirindeua	Moju	Pará	Iterpa	85	1.763,0618	1.763,0618	23/08/2003	
Santa Maria do Muraiteua	Santa Maria do Muraiteua	São Miguel do Guamá	Pará	Iterpa	60	398,8357	398,8357	10/05/2022	
Santa Quitéria e Itacoãozinho	Santa Quitéria e Itacoãozinho	Acará	Pará	ITERPA	67	646,5774	646,5774	17/12/2010	
Santa Rita de Barreira	Santa Rita de Barreira	São Miguel do Guamá	Pará	ITERPA	35	371,3032	371,3032	22/09/2002	
Santa Ana de Baixo	Santa Ana de Baixo	Moju	Pará	Iterpa	34	1.551,1216	1.551,1216	30/11/2009	
Santo Cristo	Santo Cristo	Moju	Pará	Iterpa	52	1.767,0434	1.767,0434	23/08/2003	
São José de Icatu	Icatu	Mocajuba	Pará	Iterpa	80	1,636.6122	1,636.6122	30/11/2002	
São Judas Tadeu (ARQUIOB)	São Judas Tadeu (ARQUIOB)	Bujaru	Pará	INCRA	86	2.003,6961	2.003,6961	29/10/2018	
São Manuel	São Manuel	Moju	Pará	Iterpa	68	1.163,6383	1.163,6383	20/11/2005	
São Sebastião	São Sebastião	Moju	Pará	Iterpa	39	962,0094	962,0094	30/11/2009	
São Tome Tauçú	São Tome Tauçú	Portel	Pará	Iterpa	40	2.568,6224	2.568,6224	12/03/2018	
Sítio Bosque	Sítio Bosque	Moju	Pará	Iterpa	85	1.152,7029	1.152,7029	20/07/2015	
Tambaí-Açu	Tambaí-Açu	Mocajuba e Baião	Pará	Iterpa	66	1.824,7852	1.824,7852	30/11/2009	
Tatituquara	Tatituquara, São Sebastião, Arará, Boa Esprança	Bagre	Pará	Iterpa	41	7.662,7691	7.662,7691	21/09/2020	
Terra da Liberdade	Tomázia, Tachizal, Itapocu, Mola, Bonfim, Frade, Laguinho and Itabatinga Médio	Cametá and Mocajuba	Pará	Iterpa	189	11.953,4934	11.953,4934	02/07/2013	
Tipitinga	Tipitinga	Santa Luzia do Pará	Pará	Iterpa	27	633,4357	633,4357	13/05/2008	
Trombetas	Bacabal, Aracuan de Cima, Aracuan do Meio, Aracuan de Baixo, Serrinha, Terra Preta II e Jarauacá	Oriximiná	Pará	ITERPA	138	80.887,0941	57.024,6216	20/11/1997	
Trombetas	Bacabal, Aracuan de Cima, Aracuan do Meio, Aracuan de Baixo, Serrinha, Terra Preta II e Jarauacá	Oriximiná	Pará	INCRA	138	80.887,0941	23.862,4725	20/11/1997	
União São João	União São João	Prainha	Pará	ITERPA	48	1.806,8912	1.806,8912	19/11/2020	
Vila Caeté	Vila Caeté	Abaetetuba e Barcarena	Pará	ITERPA	110	1.345,3062	1.345,3062	06/03/2018	
