= Biopalma =

Defunct Brazilian company

Biopalma da Amazônia S/A Reflorestamento Indústria e Comércio
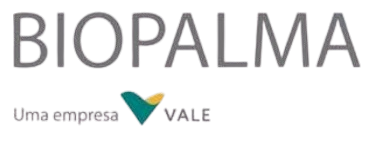
- Trade name: Biopalma
- Industry: Vegetable oil production, animal food, sustainable energy, consultancy
- Predecessor: Mineração Império Serrano Ltda.
- Founded: April 20, 2007; 19 years ago
- Defunct: October 23, 2020
- Successor: Brasil BioFuels
- Headquarters: Belém, Brazil
- Key people: Eduardo Ieda (president)
- Parent: Família MSP; Pembroke Pines Fund LLC; Vale S.A.

Biopalma da Amazônia S/A Reflorestamento Indústria e Comércio was a company focused on the production of palm oil and other vegetable oils. It also produced energy using biomass and other industrial residues, commercialized wood and animal food and gave consultancy for agribusiness and the industrial sector.

Biopalma was created in 2007 by Mineração Santa Elena, and operated in the state of Pará, Brazil. It became a subsidiary of Vale S.A. in 2011, as the company aimed to enter in the sustainable energy sector, and formed the joint venture Biovale. The company was sold in 2020 for Brasil BioFuels.

== History ==
Biopalma was created on 20 April 2007, when Mineração Império Serrano Ltda. became an S.A. Originally, Mineração Santa Elina controlled 99% of the company, and MSP controlled 1%. On 10 June, Pembroke Pines Fund LLC bought 99.98% of the shares, thus becoming the biggest actionist. On 22 November, Pembroke Pines transferred their shares to PMS Participações Ltda and Santa Elina transferred their shares to Grupo MSP. On 4 April and 27 June 2008, shares were emitted for Bio Participações S/A. In the new configuration, PMS controlled 83.84% of the company, Bio Participações controlled 16.14% and MSP 0.02%.

The company initially bought more than 100 farms for oil palm plantation. On 1 May 2009, Biopalma and Vale S.A. created the Brazilian Consortium for the Production of Palm Oil (CBOP), where Vale controlled 41% of the partnership.

On 15 July 2009, PMS transferred a debt of R$ 25.5 million with Banco Itaú to Biopalma. On 16 December, PMS donated shares to Bio Participações, that began to control 21.7% of the company. In the beginning of 2010, MSP merged PMS (both were subsidiaries from Família MSP), thus controlling 78,3% of the company.

On 15 October 2010, Vale paid R$ 90,500,812.00 to Biopalma. The money was used to pay Itaú, including the debt Santa Elina had in the name of MSP. On 1 November, MSP was reorganized, and part of the shares were transferred to Fundo MSP. In this new configuration, Fundo MSP had 74.76% of the company, Bio Participações had 20.11%, MSP had 3.53% and 1.6% still had to be redistributed.

On 28 January 2011, part of Biopalma's debt with Vale was transformed into shares. Santa Elina and MSP paid the rest of the debt through what they owned from Biopalma's participation in quitting their debt with Itaú. In the new configuration, Vale bought 70% of Biopalma for US$ 173.5 million for the production of B20 fuel (20% biodiesel, 80% diesel). The aim of Vale was for internal use, as in 2009 the company consumed 1.1 billion liters of biodiesel, and to sell for the Brazilian market, specially for Petrobras. Grupo MSP owned the remaining 30% of Biopalma. Both companies formed a joint venture called Biovale. In 2016, Vale had 98,12% of Biopalma, Grupo MSP had 1,23% and Biopalma Participações S.A. had 0,65%.

In 2019, Vale announced that Biopalma had a liability of R$ 965 million and the sale of the subsidiary. As the biodiesel market was growing, Marborges Agroindústria and Brasil BioFuels (BBF) disputed to acquire it. Marborges entered with a legal action affirming that BBF was benefited by Vale during the sale process, but on 23 October 2020, Administrative Council for Economic Defense (CADE) accepted the sale to BBF.

== Operation ==
Initially, Biopalma bought 70 thousand ha on Pará for oil palm plantation, located on the cities of Moju, Tomé-Açu, Concórdia do Pará, Abaetetuba, Bujaru, Igarapé-Miri, São Domingos do Capim and Acará. Those areas were marked as degraded by the Federal Government and are reforested with oil palm by the company. The planting and harvesting process is done in a family farm model. In February 2010, Biopalma created the Family Agriculture Program with the objective of involving 2 thousand families on the oil palm plantation process up until 2013. Those families receive 10 ha, technical assistance and a loan for purchasing raw materials for 30 years from Amazônia Bank through the Pronaf Eco Dendê credit line. In 2014, Biopalma made a partnership with Embrapa Amazônia Oriental to launch a program where 60 families were taught how to plant cassava between the oil palm trees.

In 2009, the company made a consortium with Vale to produce palm oil. In 2012, after Vale acquired the company, they bought deforested areas from the Amazon rainforest, totalizing 56 thousand ha covering Acará Valley and Baixo Tocantins, and invested US$ 500 million on oil palm production. Initially, the oil was sold for the food industry, but Vale's objective was to enter in the biodiesel market and to reduce their green footprint while raising their energy production. In 2016, 19% of their oil production was for external markets, with 63% for Latin-American countries and 37% for European countries.

On 26 June 2012, they opened their first palm extraction plant in Moju in a partnership with Grupo MSP. The plant was capable of producing 25 tons of oil per hour. Vale predicted that the factory should start producing biodiesel in 2015. In 2014, another plant was inaugurated in Acará, producing 220 tons of oil per year. Plans were made to open yet another plant in 2015, but the business model didn't work out.

== Controversies ==
=== Fiscal fraud ===
According to the Ministry of Finance, in 2011 Família MSP sold Biopalma to Vale, but it made a series of transfers through Irajá Consultoria and used MSP FIP tax exemption to fulfill the sale. In this way, the company avoided paying taxes to the Government of Brazil. The process was closed on 20 November 2018, as it was understood the transferring process was valid.

=== Armed conflicts ===
Biopalma, and later Brasil BioFuels, entered in a conflict with the Tembé population, called Oil Palm War. The case is investigated by the Federal Public Ministry since 2012.

== Prizes ==
In 2015, Biopalma was a finalist on Agropará Prize in the Palm category, but lost to Mejer Agroflorestal LTDA.
