= Icatu (quilombo) =

Afro-Brazilian community in Pará, Brazil

Icatu or Comunidade São José de Icatu is a quilombola community with origins in 1770 and is located between the Brazilian municipalities of Mocajuba and Baião, in the northeast region of the state of Pará, in an area of 1,636.6122 hectares.

== Origin ==
The Icatu quilombo originated in 1770, formed by remnants of slaves, who fled the farms in the municipalities of Abaetetuba and Igarapé-Miri, settling in the lands of São José de Icatu, close to the municipalities of Mocajuba and Baião.

In November 2002, the community was recognized as a traditional quilombola population, through the Pará Land Institute - Iterpa, housing 80 families descended from slaves in the Tomé-Açu Microregion.

== Activities ==
The quilombolas of Icatu practice the basic economic activities of fishing and subsistence agriculture, planting beans, pepper and cassava.
