= Pará State University =

Public University in Pará, Brazil

- Universidade do Estado do Pará
- Other name: UEPA
- Type: Public university
- Established: May 18, 1993
- President: Clay Anderson Nunes Chagas
- Vice-president: Ilma Pastana Ferreira
- Academic staff: 803
- Administrative staff: 1,120
- Students: 14,943
- Undergraduates: 14,721
- Postgraduates: 222
- Location: Belém (five campuses), Paragominas, Conceição do Araguaia, Marabá, Altamira, Igarapé-Açu, São Miguel do Guamá, Santarém, Tucuruí, Moju, Redenção, Barcarena, Vigia de Nazaré, Cametá, Salvaterra, and Castanhal, Pará, Brazil; 1.4317°S 48.4879°W
- Website: Portal da UEPA

Pará State University (Portuguese: Universidade do Estado do Pará, UEPA) is the only public university maintained by the state government of Pará, Brazil. The university has over 14,000 students enrolled in its 57 courses, from which 23 are undergraduate and 34 are graduate programs. Those programs are offered across UEPA's 20 campuses in the cities of Belém (five campuses), Paragominas, Conceição do Araguaia, Marabá, Altamira, Igarapé-Açu, São Miguel do Guamá, Santarém, Tucuruí, Moju, Redenção, Barcarena, Vigia de Nazaré, Cametá, Salvaterra, and Castanhal.

== See also ==
- List of state universities in Brazil
