= Pororoca =

Tidal bore on the Amazon River

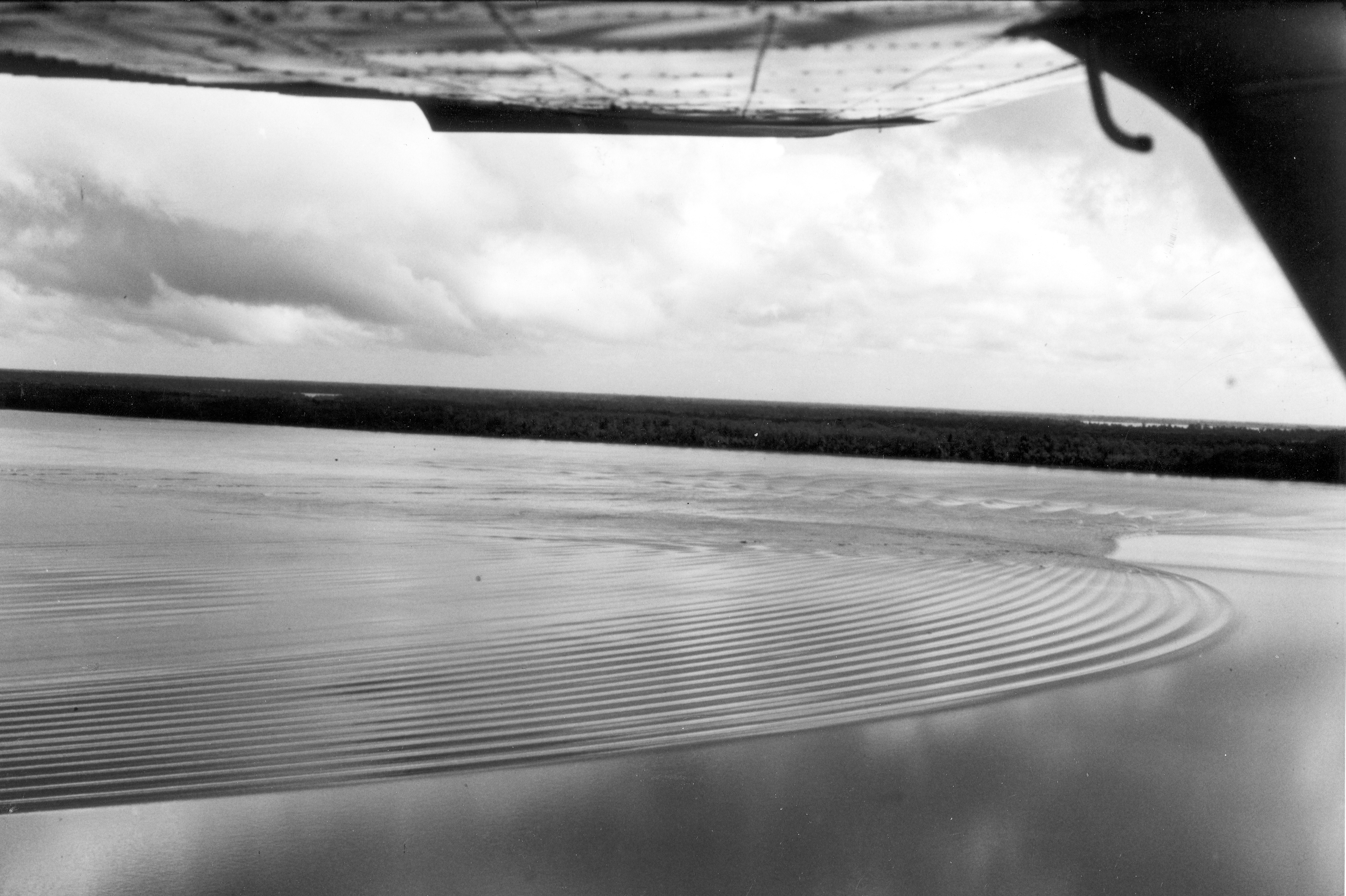
Pororoca near the mouth of the Araguari River, seen from an airplane

The Pororoca (Portuguese pronunciation: [pɔɾɔˈɾɔkɐ], [poɾoˈɾɔkɐ]) is a tidal bore, with waves up to 4 m (13 ft) high that travel as much as 800 km (500 mi) inland upstream on the Amazon River and adjacent rivers. It occurs at the mouth of the river where its waters meet the Atlantic Ocean. It can be observed from the islands Marajó and Caviana, and in various rivers of the state Pará.

== Etymology ==
Its name might come from the indigenous Tupi language, where it could translate into "great roar". It could be also a Portuguese version of the term poroc-poroc, which in an indigenous' language was a way of expressing the act of destroying everything. It could be also a portmanteau of the words poroc (to take out, to tear away) and oca (house).

== Explanation ==
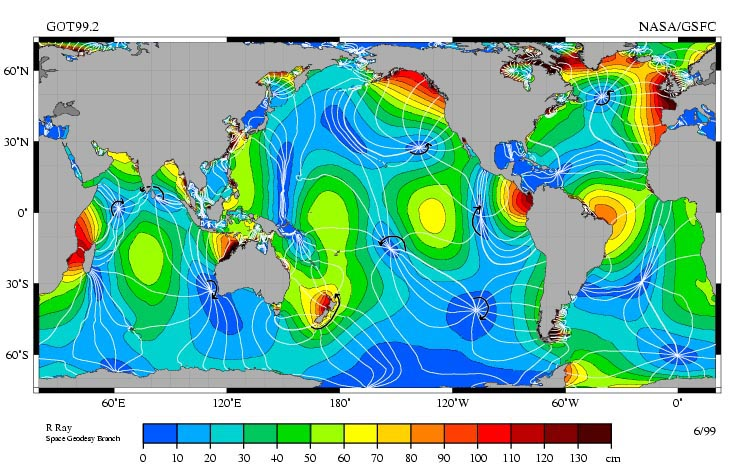
Map showing the M2 tidal constituent as quite high in this area, meaning greater tides

During new and full moons, when the ocean tide is highest, water flows in from the Atlantic, rather than the other way around. The Amazon's flow reverses, the distance of which depends largely on the rainwater-generated outflow of the Amazon, and a water bulge speeds upstream often with great force, forming a tidal bore with an audible noise. The tidal phenomenon is best observed on biannual equinoxes in September and March during a spring tide. On an equinoctial spring tide, the Moon and Sun fall into direct alignment with the Earth, and their gravitational pull is combined, bringing the Pororoca and others around the world to their peak.

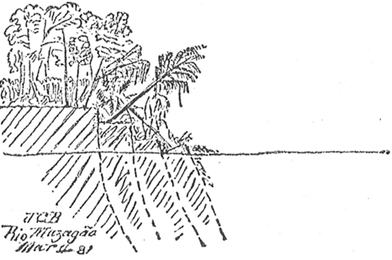
Sketch by J.C. Branner (1881) of the destructive impact of the Pororoca on a river bank

The underwater bathymetry in the Amazon Delta contributes to the development of the Pororoca, which can become up to 50 kilometres (31 mi) wide. Its shape and appearance changes as a function of the complex topography of the river channels in the Delta. The Pororoca causes erosion, landslides and sedimentation, contributing to a certain mobility of the islands in the delta. It mixes sediments and organic matter, creating a fertile feeding ground for piranhas. Between 1845 and 1850, a particularly strong Pororoca separated the island Caviana into two parts, afterwards named Inner and Outer Caviana.

Outside the state Pará, the Pororoca can be observed in the Mearim River in the state Maranhão, 690 kilometres (430 mi) south-east of the mouth of the Amazon.

Jules Verne gave a rather accurate description of the Pororoca between the islands Caviana and Mexiana in his novel The Giant Raft, although he had never visited the area.

== Surfing ==
The wave has become popular with surfers. Since 1999, an annual championship has been held in São Domingos do Capim (on the adjacent Guamá River). However, surfing the Pororoca is especially dangerous, as the water contains a significant amount of debris from the shores of the river (often entire trees), in addition to dangerous fauna. In 2003 the Brazilian Picuruta Salazar won the event with a record ride of 12.5 km (7.8 mi) lasting 37 minutes.
