= Ourém, Pará =

Municipality in Pará, Brazil

Coordinates: 1°33′S 47°06′W

Ourém
- Municipality
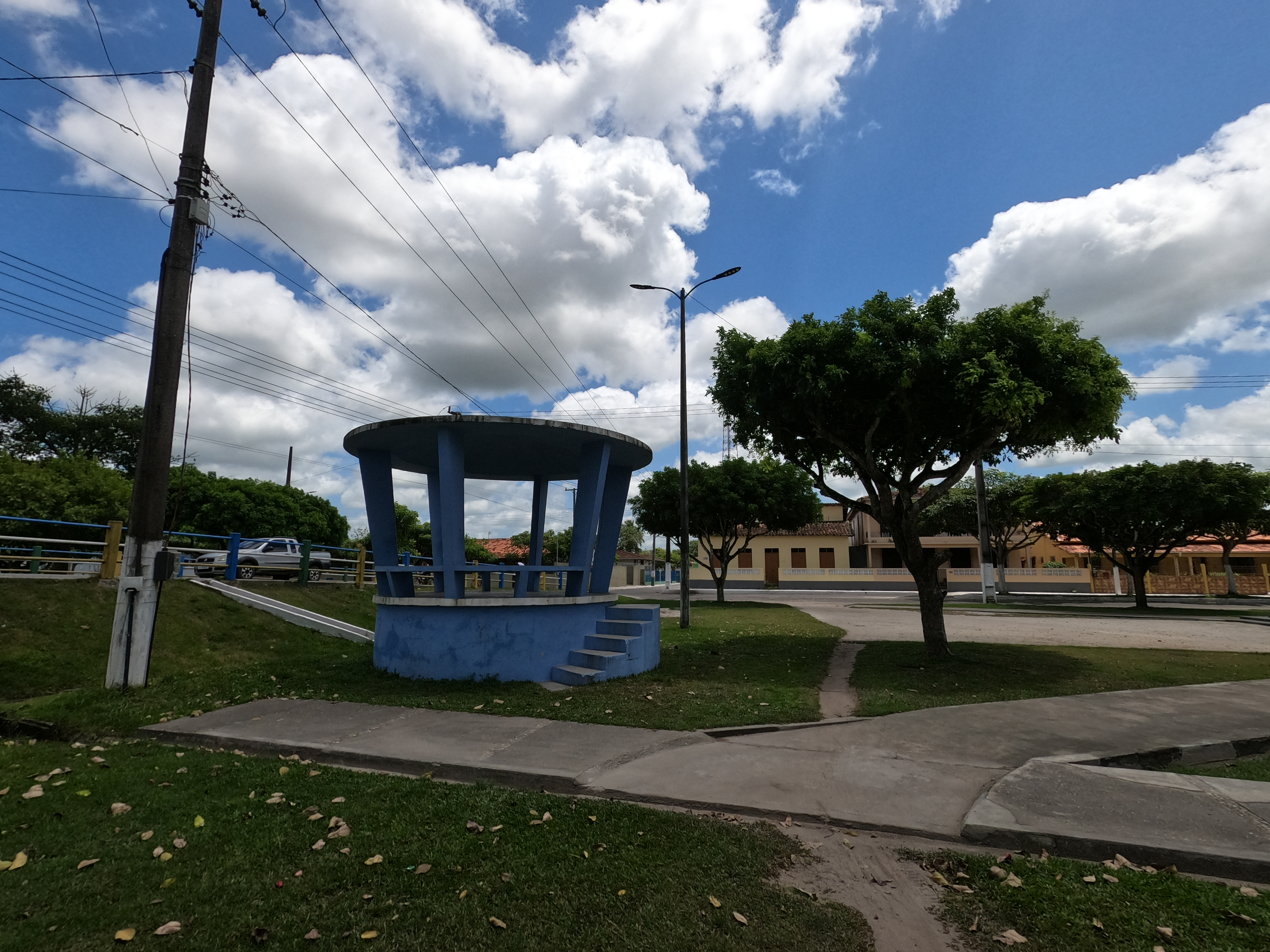

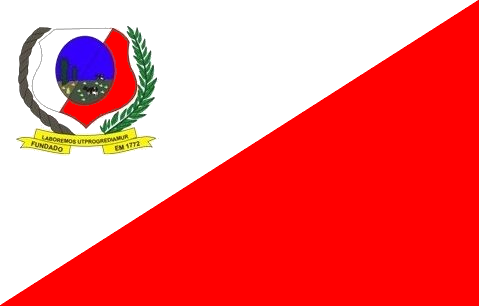
- Flag
- Interactive map of Ourém
- Country: Brazil
- Region: Northern
- State: Pará
- Mesoregion: Nordeste Paraense

Population (2020)
  - Total: 17,961
- Time zone: UTC−3 (BRT)

Ourém is a municipality in the state of Pará in the Northern region of Brazil.

The unclassified extinct Gambela language was spoken near Ourém.

== See also ==
- List of municipalities in Pará
