= Inhangapi =

Coordinates: 1°25′S 47°53′W

- Municipality
- Interactive map of Inhangapi
- Country: Brazil
- Region: Northern
- State: Pará
- Mesoregion: Metropolitana de Belém

Population (2020)
  - Total: 11,861
- Time zone: UTC−3 (BRT)

Inhangapi is a municipality in the state of Pará in the Northern region of Brazil.

== See also ==
- List of municipalities in Pará
