= Nova Timboteua =

Municipality in Pará, Brazil

Coordinates: 1°12′S 47°24′W

- Municipality
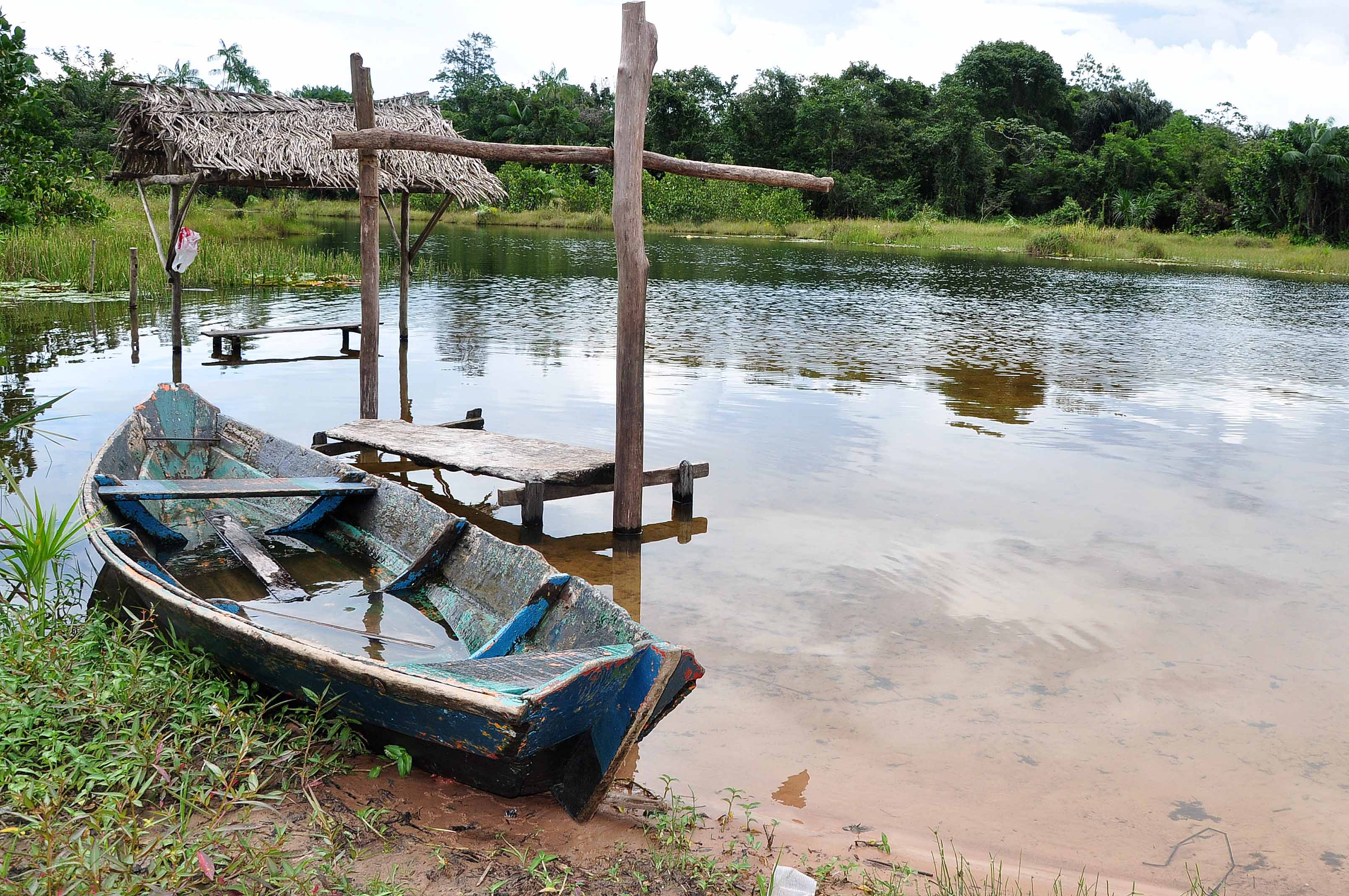

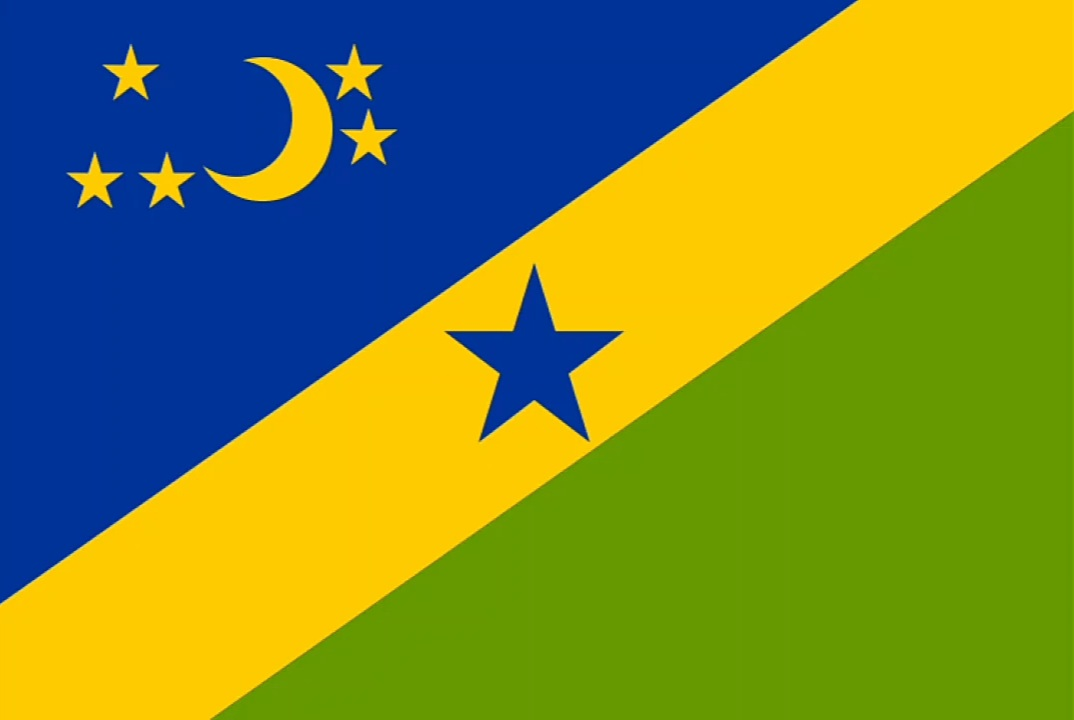
- Flag
- Interactive map of Nova Timboteua
- Country: Brazil
- Region: Northern
- State: Pará
- Mesoregion: Nordeste Paraense

Population (2020)
  - Total: 15,506
- Time zone: UTC−3 (BRT)

Nova Timboteua is a municipality in the state of Pará in the Northern region of Brazil.

== See also ==
- List of municipalities in Pará
