= Saracura Quilombola Community =

Saracura is a quilombo remnant community and also a riverside community, traditional Brazilian populations, located on the banks of the Amazon River, in the Brazilian municipality of Santarém, in Pará. The Saracura community consists of a population of 92 families, distributed over an area of 2,889.9571 hectares. The territory was certified as a quilombo remnant (historical reminiscences of former quilombos) in 2010 by the Palmares Cultural Foundation. This community had its Technical Identification and Delimitation Report published in 2008 (a stage of land regularization), but its land tenure situation is still under analysis (not titled) at INCRA.

Since the floodplain is federal property, land titling must occur via a Real Right of Use Concession Contract (CCDRU), and not by title of ownership. The transition of the process from Incra to the Secretariat of Federal Property (SPU) has generated additional obstacles, aggravated mainly by the lack of personnel and outdated legislation.

== Origin and identity of the Saracura Quilombo ==
The quilombo was formed from blacks who escaped from the Cacoal Grande farm, in Monte Alegre, and consolidated itself as a strategic refuge point in the Lower Amazon. Its name honors Sara, an enslaved woman known for her healing knowledge. The founding myth reinforces the feeling of ancestry and collective belonging, articulating memory and ethnic identity as bases for official recognition and the claiming of rights.

== Territorial situation ==
Traditional Peoples or Traditional Communities are groups that have a culture distinct from the predominant local culture, maintaining a way of life intimately linked to the natural environment in which they live. Through their own forms of social organization, use of territory and natural resources (with a subsistence relationship ), their socio-cultural-religious reproduction utilizes knowledge transmitted orally and in daily practice. The Saracura community bases its economy on agriculture and fishing. During the river flood season, residents raise the floor of their houses (a process they call "marrombar"), sometimes reaching the roof, when they move to another location (called "terra firme").

The lack of land title (land regularization) creates difficulties for quilombola communities in developing agriculture, in addition to conflicts with farmers in their regions and the impossibility of requesting social and urban policies to improve living conditions, such as urban infrastructure for energy, water and sewage networks. In the case of the Saracura community, the main conflicts are against mining, prospecting and steelmaking, as well as livestock farming.

In September 2020, the Federation of Quilombola Organizations of Santarém (FOQS) filed a request for action with the Public Prosecutor 's Office against the construction of a fuel port by the company Atem's Distribuidora de Petróleo, on the banks of the Amazon River and at the entrance to Lake Maicá, in the Área Verde neighborhood, in Santarém. According to the Saracura community, there was no free, prior and informed consultation with the 10,000 families of quilombola, indigenous and fishing people who will be impacted by the project, as required by Convention 169 (better known as the Convention on Indigenous and Tribal Peoples) of the International Labour Organization. The 10,000 families depend on the lake for their survival.

According to the Federal Public Prosecutor's Office and the Public Prosecutor's Office of Pará, in April 2020, the company had already been denounced for fraud in the environmental licensing of this project (which in September was already 97% complete): the company Atem's did not indicate that there would be transportation of dangerous goods, nor storage of fuels and other petroleum derivatives. It was found that Atem's had the "environmental licensing process facilitated, with fewer requirements and greater speed".

Even before the fuel port was operational, the most distant Quilombola communities were already experiencing impacts on fishing, because fishermen left the Lago Maicá region and moved there; leading to conflicts and violence. The company responded to the lawsuits by suggesting that the logic of the impact assessment be reversed in order to try to allow the resumption of the works: seeking to consult the communities with the works already 97% complete, therefore obtaining the preliminary licenses and certifications in the final phase of the activities.
