= Tomé-Açu =

- Municipality
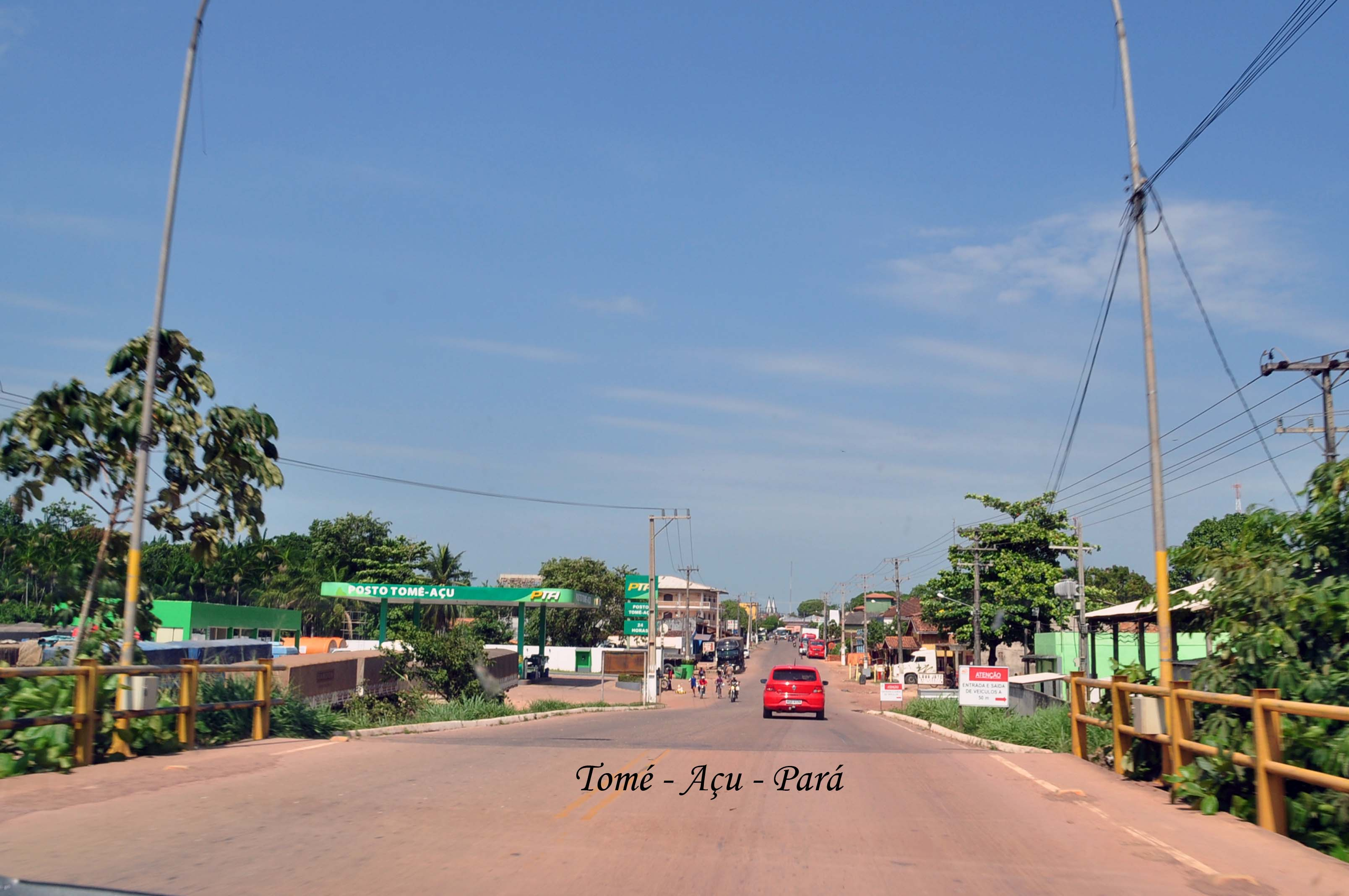
- View of Tomé-Açu in the local bridge.

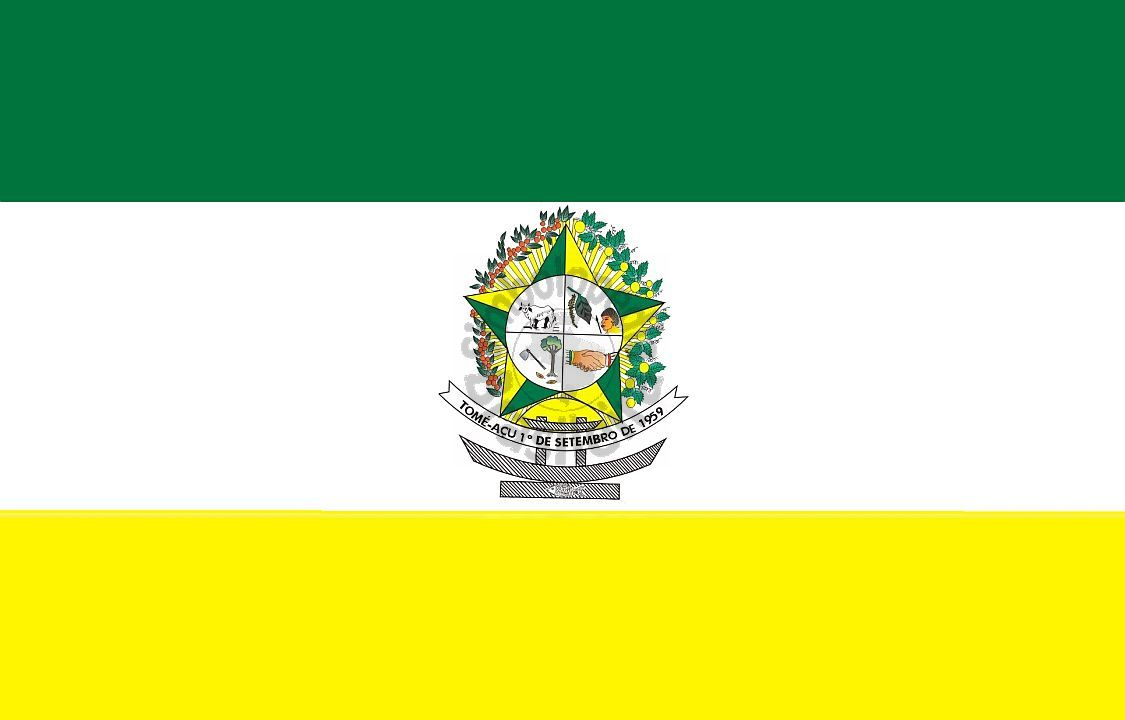
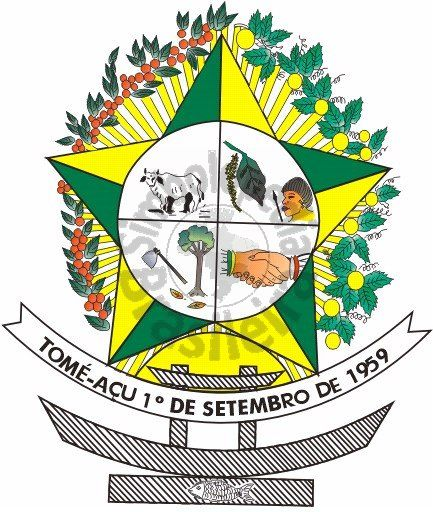
- Flag Coat of arms

- Location in Pará

- Location in Brazil
- Country: Brazil
- Region: Northern
- State: Pará
- Mesoregion: Nordeste Paraense
- Bordering municipalities: Acará, Concórdia do Pará, Tailândia, Ipixuna do Pará and Aurora do Pará
- Distance to Capital: 113km
- Foundation: September 1, 1959

Government
  - Mayor: Carlos da Vila Nova (MDB)

Population (2020)
  - Total: 64,030
- Time zone: UTC−3 (BRT)

Tomé-Açu is a municipality in the state of Pará in the Northern region of Brazil.

== History ==
The first inhabitants near the Rio Acará-Mirim are the Tembé Indians. Years later, the Portuguese José Maria de Carvalho, Viscount of Santa Cruz, he occupied the territory, being the first timber trader at the mouth of the Tomé-Açu stream. Soon after, it was transformed into the Bela Vista Farm by Mr. Agapito Joaquim de Cristo, who acquired the land by charter.

In 1938, according to State Decree-Law No. 2,972, of March 31, the territorial division of the state of Pará comprised 27 (twenty-seven) counties, 47 (forty-seven) judicial terms, 51 (fifty-one) municipalities and 246 (two hundred and forty-six) districts. In 1943, by virtue of State Decree-Law No. 4,505, of December 30, Pará now has 57 municipalities. Others were created later.

In 1988, the territorial division of the state of Pará was changed, with the creation of 18 municipalities. In 1991, 23 more were created. In the period from 1993 to 1996, another 15 were constituted, leaving the territory of Pará with a total of 143 municipalities.

=== Origin and evolution of the history of the municipality ===
The first inhabitants of the region of Rio Acará-Mirim they were identified as Tembé, whose tribes cultivated subsistence agriculture. They were part of the Tenetehara nation, which in Tupi Guarani means: “nós somos gente verdadeira”, who shared the same language and cultural tradition with the Guajará Indians of the State of Maranhão.

The first white man to occupy the territory of Tomé-Açu was the Portuguese José Maria de Carvalho, who was also the first timber trader at the mouth of the Tomé-Açu Creek, which is currently Fazenda Tomé-Açu. Soon after the timber trade, Mr. Agapito Joaquim de Cristo arrived, who acquired, by charter, the land where the city of Tomé-Açu is located today, which at that time was called Fazenda Bela Vista.

=== The arrival of the first Japanese settlers ===
According to Violeta Loureiro, in her construction of the Social and Economic History of the Amazon, it is mentioned that, in 1926, somewhat late in relation to other states of Brazil, a group of Japanese "scientists" went to Pará whose mission was to locate areas in which agricultural colonies could be installed and, from them, boost the economy through the development of crops, as well as modern cultivation practices.

The result of the work led to the identification of areas in the State of Amazonas (in Manacapuru) and in the State of Pará (Baixo Amazonas, Santarém, Monte Alegre and Tomé-Açu).

With the establishment of the Japan Plantation Company of Brazil in 1929. Fazenda Bela Vista was sold to the Japanese Company, which installed in it the Central Administration of the company, when the first Japanese settlers arrived (42 families, a total of 189 people much less compared to cities like São Paulo, Curitiba and Campo Grande) the same people who, supported by a certain volume of capital, as well as by a millenary tradition in agriculture, were installed in the place.

In the beginning the families planted rice and vegetables, where, due to the isolation of the place, they found an immense challenge to drain the production many of these families did not get used to the climate of the north region and migrated to the southeast, center-west and south.

=== World War II and the concentration camp in Tomé-Açu ===
As a result of World War II, between 1939 and 1945, the presence of Japanese immigrants and immigrants from Axis countries was viewed with suspicion, as it was believed that they could be infiltrated agents. In the Região Norte it was no different, for example, in Belém the military set fire to houses, burned the Japanese publication, assaulted and stoned Japanese immigrants.

Immigrants from Belém, Parintins, Manaus and other regions were forced to submit to a situation of isolation similar to that of a concentration camp in the confines of the municipality of Acará, where the current Tomé-Açu is located today. The choice of the region was strategic because it prevented, due to natural barriers, wild animals, other factors, and contact with other Japanese immigrants who lived in the outside world.
