= Quilombo Boa Vista =

Quilombo Boa VIsta is a quilombo territory located in Oriximiná, Pará. It became the first quilombo territory in Brazil to receive its land title from INCRA under the ordinance on November 20, 1995. Oriximiná is a municipality in the Amazon region of Pará, where approximately ten thousand quilombola people and 3,500 indigenous people live in twelve territories.

== Population ==
The Boa Vista community consists of a population of 112 families, distributed across an area of 1,125.0341 hectares.

== Demarcation process ==
Despite being the first quilombo territory to receive land title, the community still has a Technical Identification and Delimitation Report (RTID) that is still being prepared.

The Technical Report of Identification and Delimitation (RTID) presents historical, anthropological, socio-economic, land tenure, cartographic, environmental and occupational information that comprises the land regularization of lands traditionally occupied by the remaining quilombo community.

== Protection ==
In 1989, the São Paulo Pro-Indian Commission and the Iepé Indigenous Research and Training Institute partnered with the indigenous and quilombola communities of the region in the struggle to ensure the guarantee of rights and the consolidation of their organizations. Through this partnership, in September 2012 the "1st Indian & Quilombola Meeting" took place in Oriximiná, which resulted in the "Indigenous-Quilombola Alliance".

== Difficulties ==
The community is largely still covered by well-preserved forests, with low population density (0.4 inhabitants/km² ), but the advance of human occupation and urbanization in this region of the Amazon has made the territories vulnerable to a number of threats, such as mineral exploration and the construction of hydroelectric dams.

The community still faces numerous socio-environmental impacts due to 41 years of mining in the region, being a neighbor of a large Brazilian bauxite producing company, which has built 26 tailings dams in Oriximiná that cause contamination of rivers and springs.
