= Cachoeira do Piriá =

Coordinates: 1.67083°S 46.5289°W

- Municipality
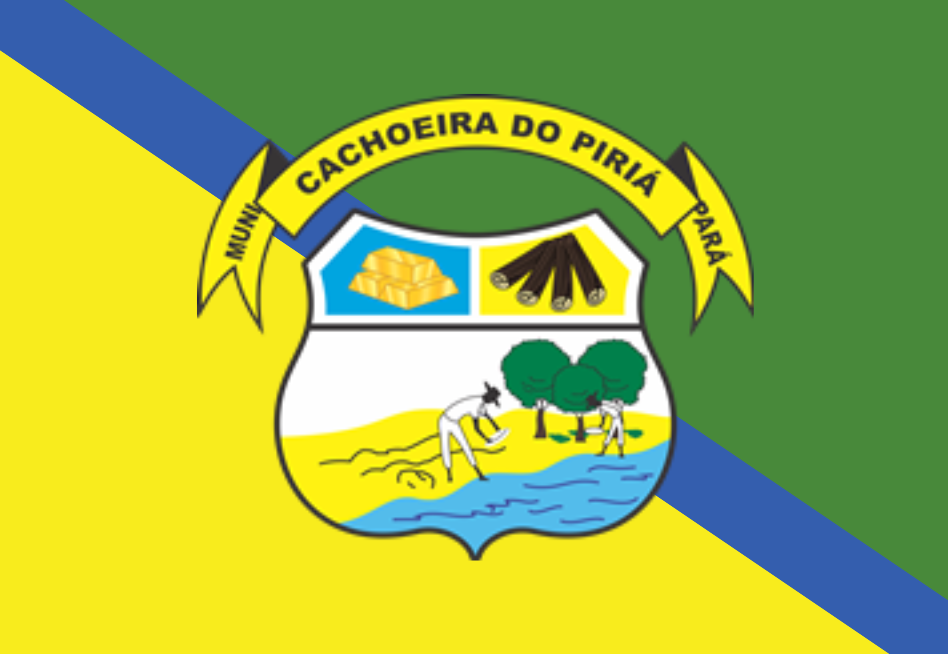
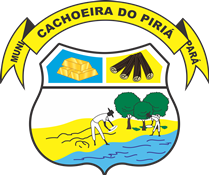
- Flag Coat of arms
- Interactive map of Cachoeira do Piriá
- Country: Brazil
- Region: Northern
- State: Pará
- Mesoregion: Nordeste Paraense

Population (2020)
  - Total: 34,609
- Time zone: UTC−3 (BRT)

Cachoeira do Piriá is a municipality in the state of Pará in the Northern region of Brazil.

== See also ==
- List of municipalities in Pará
