= Garrafão do Norte =

Coordinates: 1.93389°S 47.0528°W

Garrafão do Norte, Brazil
- Municipality
- Flag
- Interactive map of Garrafão do Norte, Brazil
- Country: Brazil
- Region: Northern
- State: Pará
- Mesoregion: Nordeste Paraense

Population (2020)
  - Total: 26,111
- Time zone: UTC−3 (BRT)

Garrafão do Norte is a municipality in the state of Pará in the Northern region of Brazil.

== See also ==
- List of municipalities in Pará
