= Santa Luzia do Pará =

Coordinates: 1.51694°S 46.9419°W

- Municipality
- Flag
- Interactive map of Santa Luzia do Pará
- Country: Brazil
- Region: Northern
- State: Pará
- Mesoregion: Nordeste Paraense

Population (2020)
  - Total: 19,843
- Time zone: UTC−3 (BRT)

Santa Luzia do Pará is a municipality in the state of Pará in the Northern region of Brazil.

== See also ==
- List of municipalities in Pará
