= Oeiras do Pará =

Municipality in Pará, Brazil

Coordinates: 1°58′S 49°51′W

- Municipality
- Interactive map of Oeiras do Pará
- Country: Brazil
- Region: Northern
- State: Pará
- Mesoregion: Nordeste Paraense

Population (2020)
  - Total: 32,850
- Time zone: UTC−3 (BRT)

Oeiras do Pará is a municipality in the state of Pará in the Northern region of Brazil.

== See also ==
- List of municipalities in Pará
