= Bonito, Pará =

Coordinates: 1°21′46″S 47°18′25″W

- Municipality
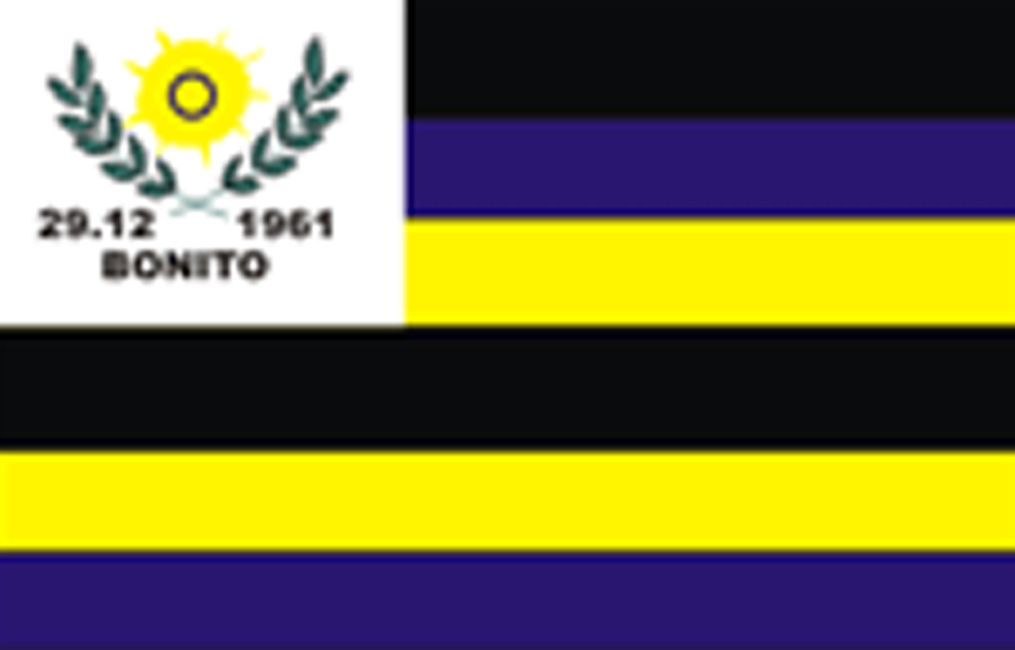
- Flag
- Interactive map of Bonito, Pará
- Country: Brazil
- Region: Northern
- State: Pará
- Mesoregion: Nordeste Paraense

Population (2020)
  - Total: 16,530
- Time zone: UTC−3 (BRT)

Bonito, Pará is a municipality in the state of Pará in the Northern region of Brazil.

== See also ==
- List of municipalities in Pará
