= Viseu, Pará =

Viseu
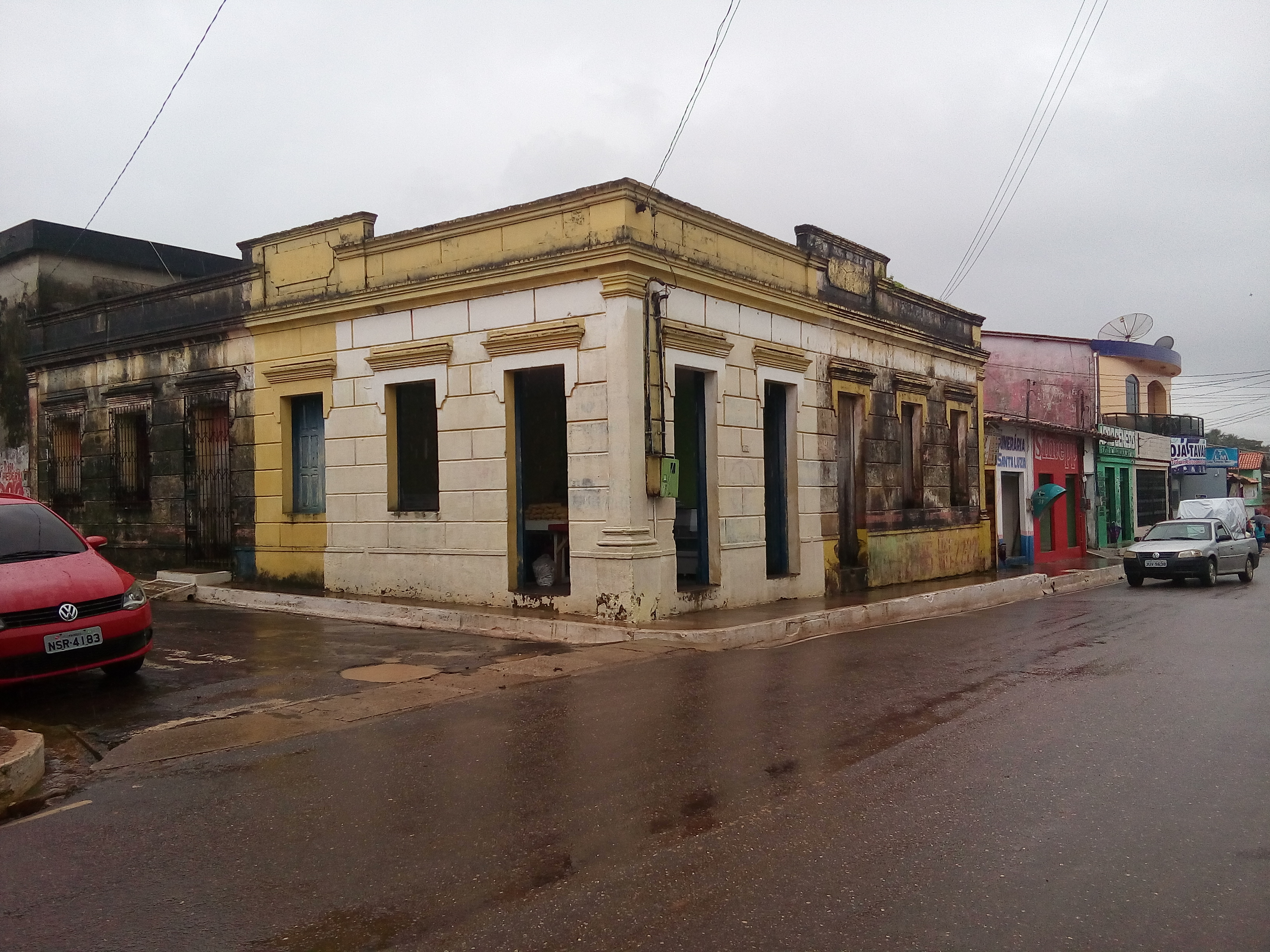

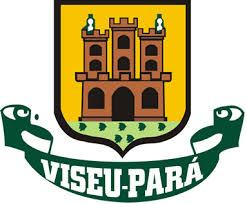
- Flag Coat of arms

- Location of Viseu
- Coordinates: 01°11′49″S 46°08′24″W
- Country: Brazil
- Region: Norte
- State: Pará

Area
  - Total: 4,972.897 km^{2} (1,920.046 sq mi)
- Elevation: 15 m (49 ft)

Population (2021)
  - Total: 62,093
  - Density: 11.5/km^{2} (30/sq mi)
- Time zone: UTC−3 (BRT)
- HDI (2000): 0.605 – medium

Viseu is a Brazilian municipality in the state of Pará. It is located at an altitude of 15 meters. Its estimated population in 2021 was 62,093 inhabitants according to IBGE. It has an area of 4,972.897 km^{2} and a population density of 12.57 inhabitants/km^{2}.
