= Santa Isabel do Pará =

Coordinates: 1°16′S 48°11′W

- Municipality
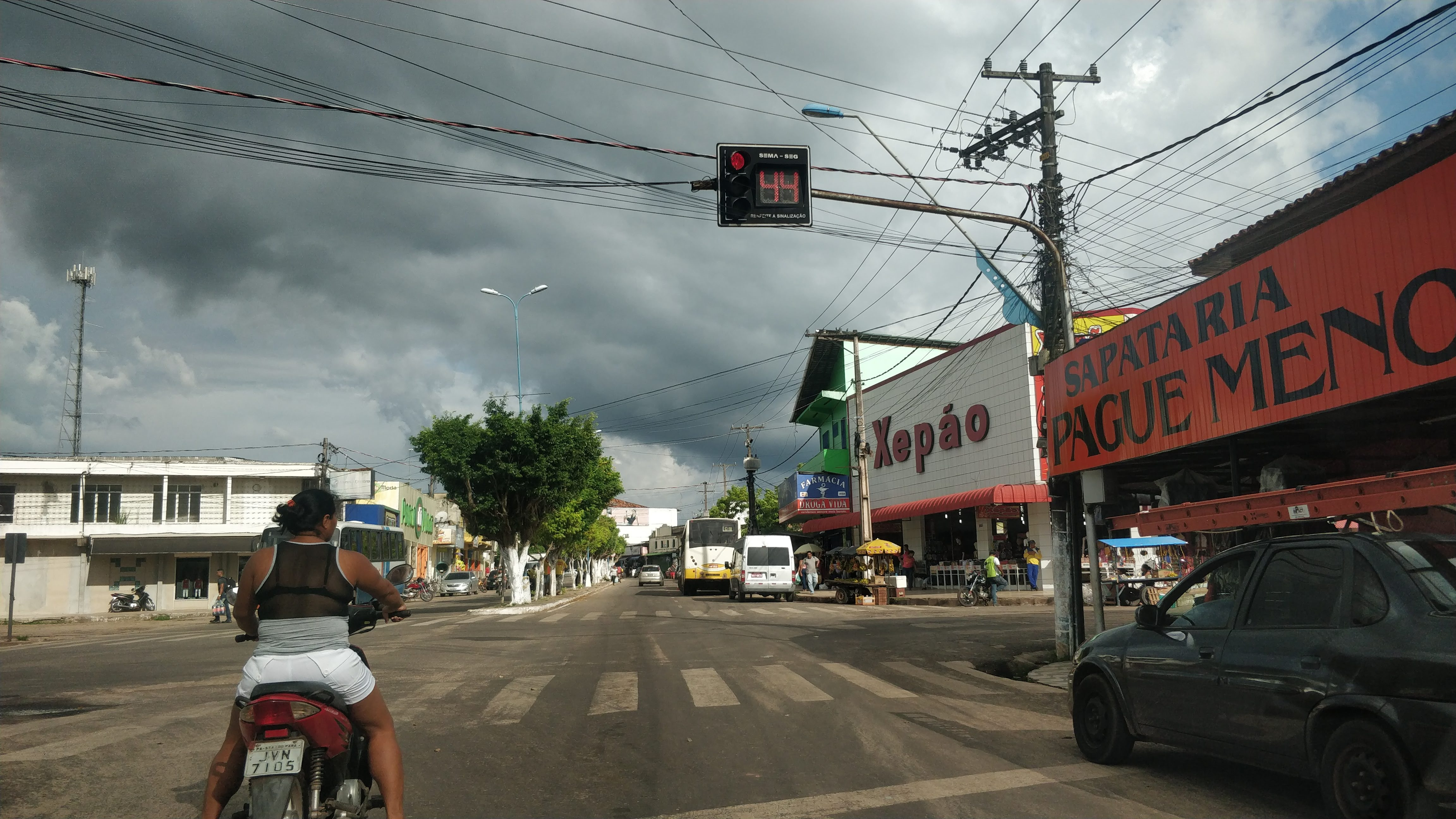

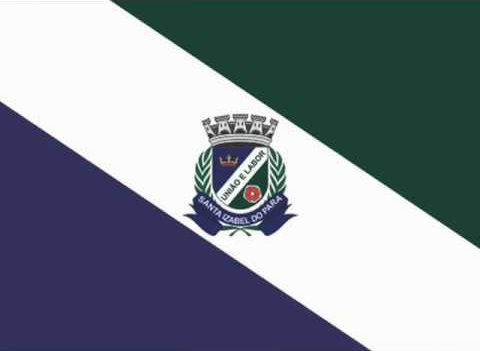
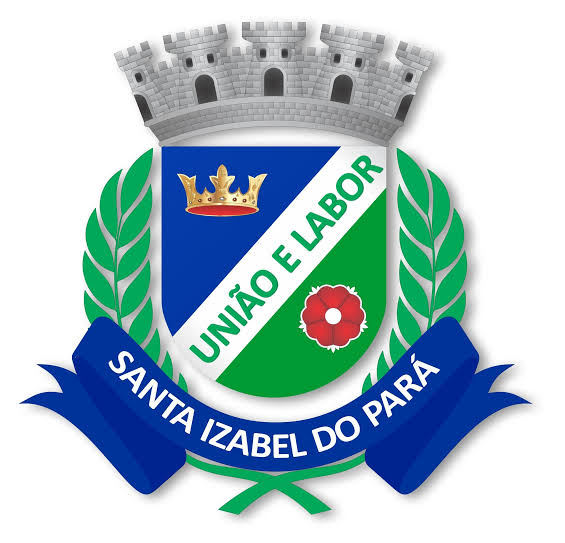
- Flag Coat of arms
- Interactive map of Santa Isabel do Pará
- Country: Brazil
- Region: Northern
- State: Pará
- Mesoregion: Metropolitana de Belém

Population (2020)
  - Total: 71,837
- Time zone: UTC−3 (BRT)

Santa Isabel do Pará is a municipality in the state of Pará in the Northern region of Brazil.

== See also ==
- List of municipalities in Pará
