= Irituia =

Coordinates: 1°46′S 47°26′W

- Municipality
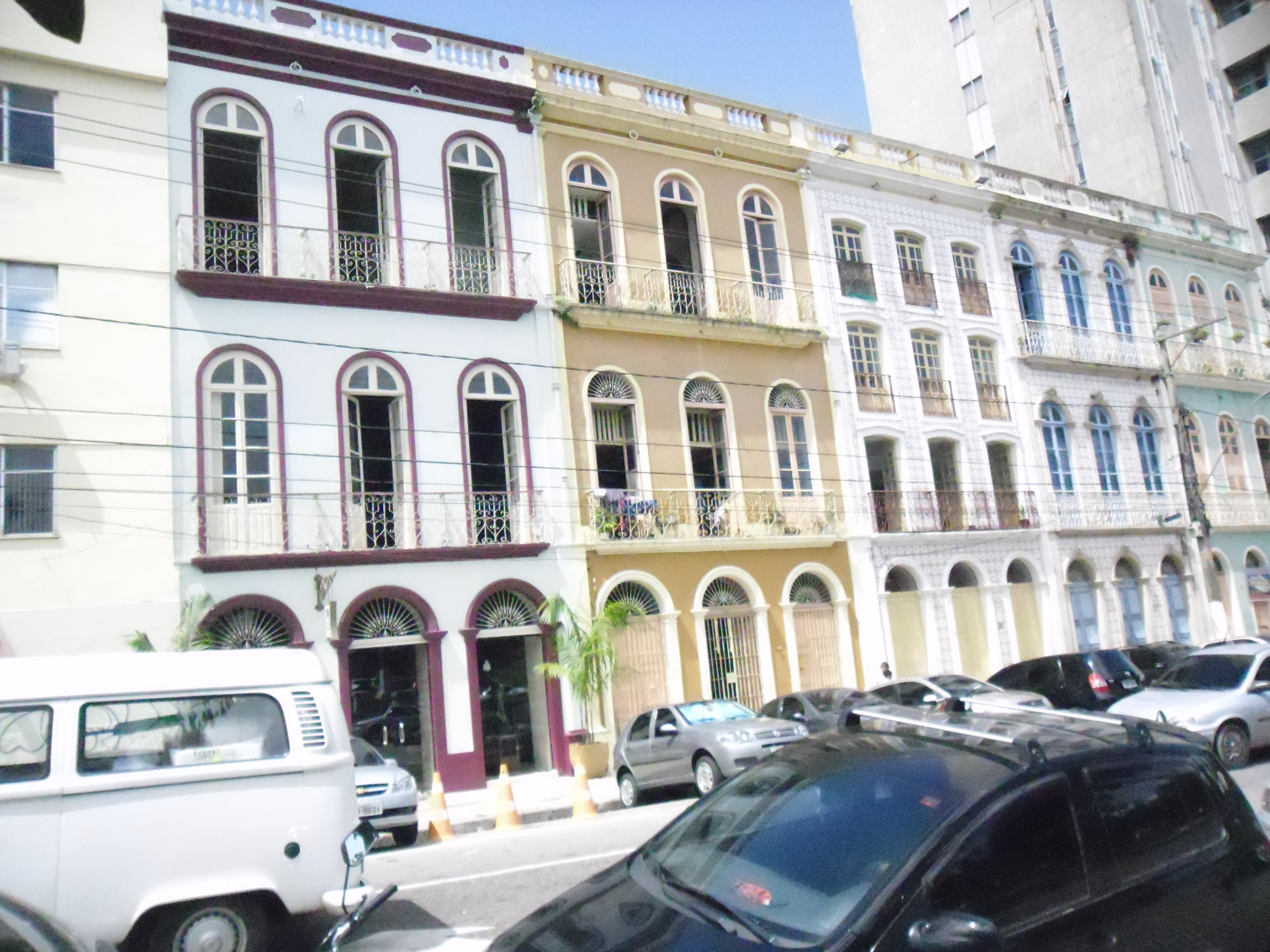

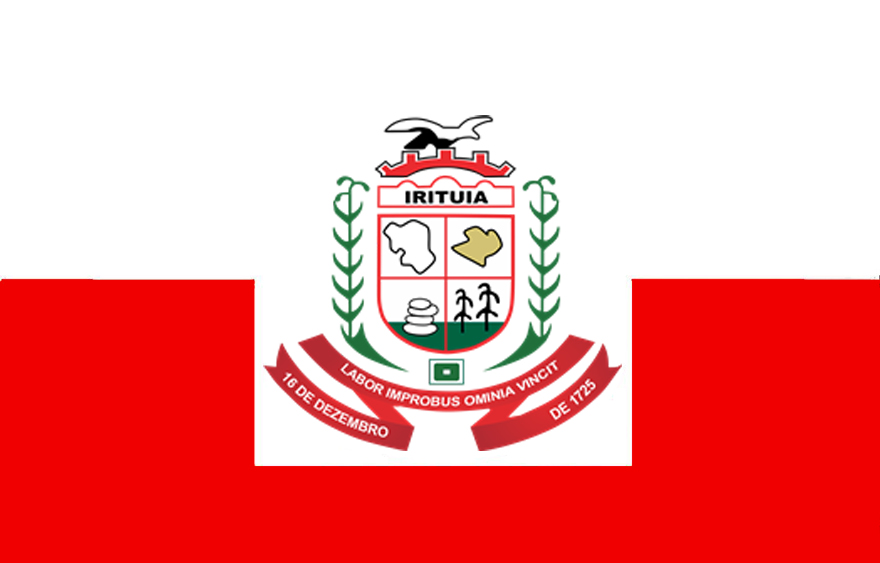
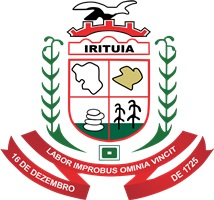
- Flag Coat of arms
- Interactive map of Irituia
- Country: Brazil
- Region: Northern
- State: Pará
- Mesoregion: Nordeste Paraense

Population (2020)
  - Total: 32,595
- Time zone: UTC−3 (BRT)

Irituia is a municipality in the state of Pará in the Northern region of Brazil.

== See also ==
- List of municipalities in Pará
