= São Domingos do Capim =

- Municipality
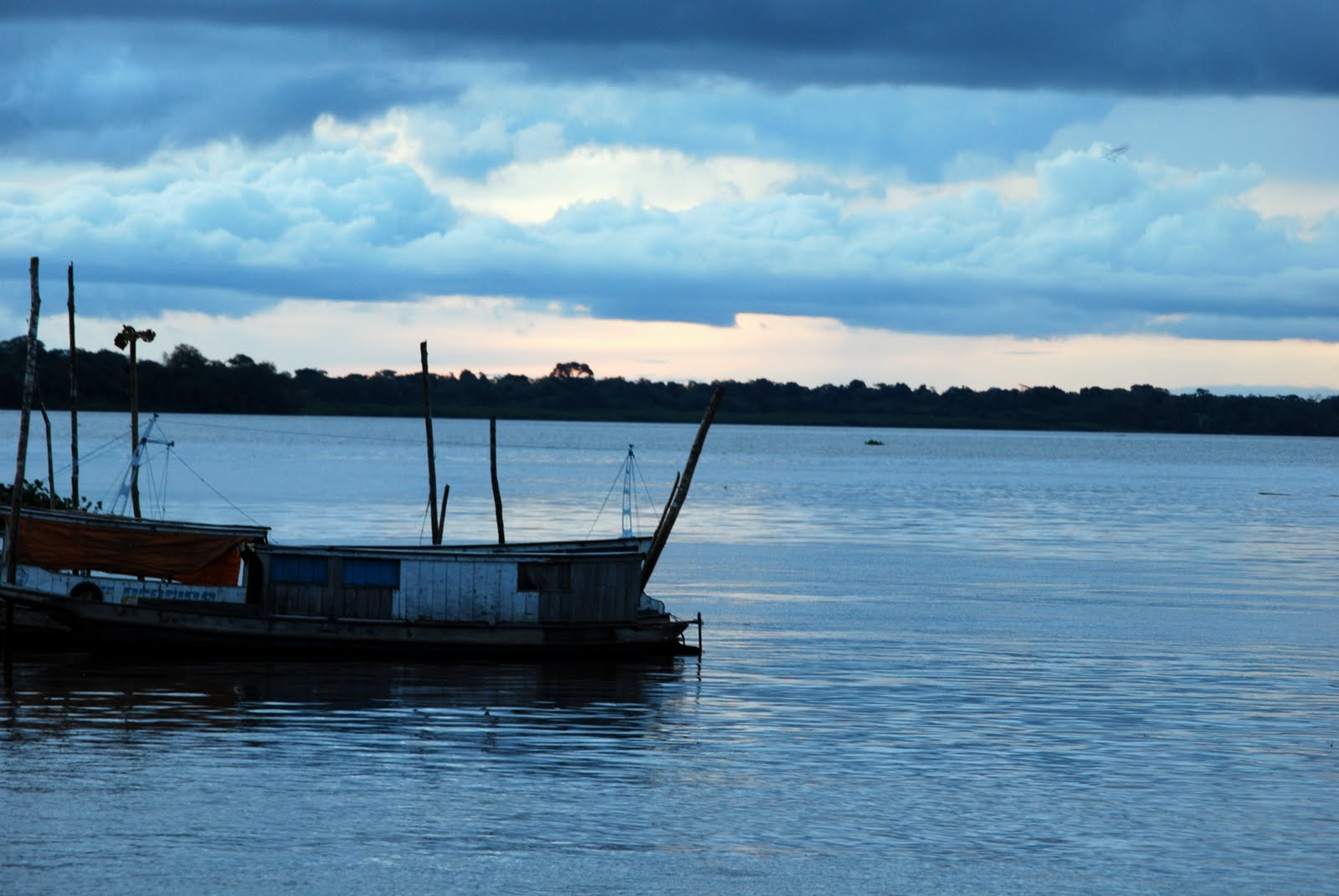

- Location in Pará state

- Location in Brazil
- Coordinates: 1°40′30″S 47°46′30″W
- Country: Brazil
- Region: North
- State: Pará

Area
  - Total: 1,677 km^{2} (647 sq mi)

Population (2020)
  - Total: 32,139
  - Density: 19.16/km^{2} (49.64/sq mi)
- Time zone: UTC−3 (BRT)

São Domingos do Capim (Brazilian Portuguese pronunciation: [sɐ̃w duˈmĩɡuz du kaˈpĩ]) is a Brazilian municipality in the state of Pará. The estimated population is 32,139 (2020). It has an area of 1677 km^{2}.

The city is well known for hosting a world surfing championship in the bore tides of the Guamá River, a phenomenon which is locally referred to as the pororoca. The championships take place between March and April.
