= Baião, Pará =

Coordinates: 2°47′27″S 49°40′19″W

- Municipality
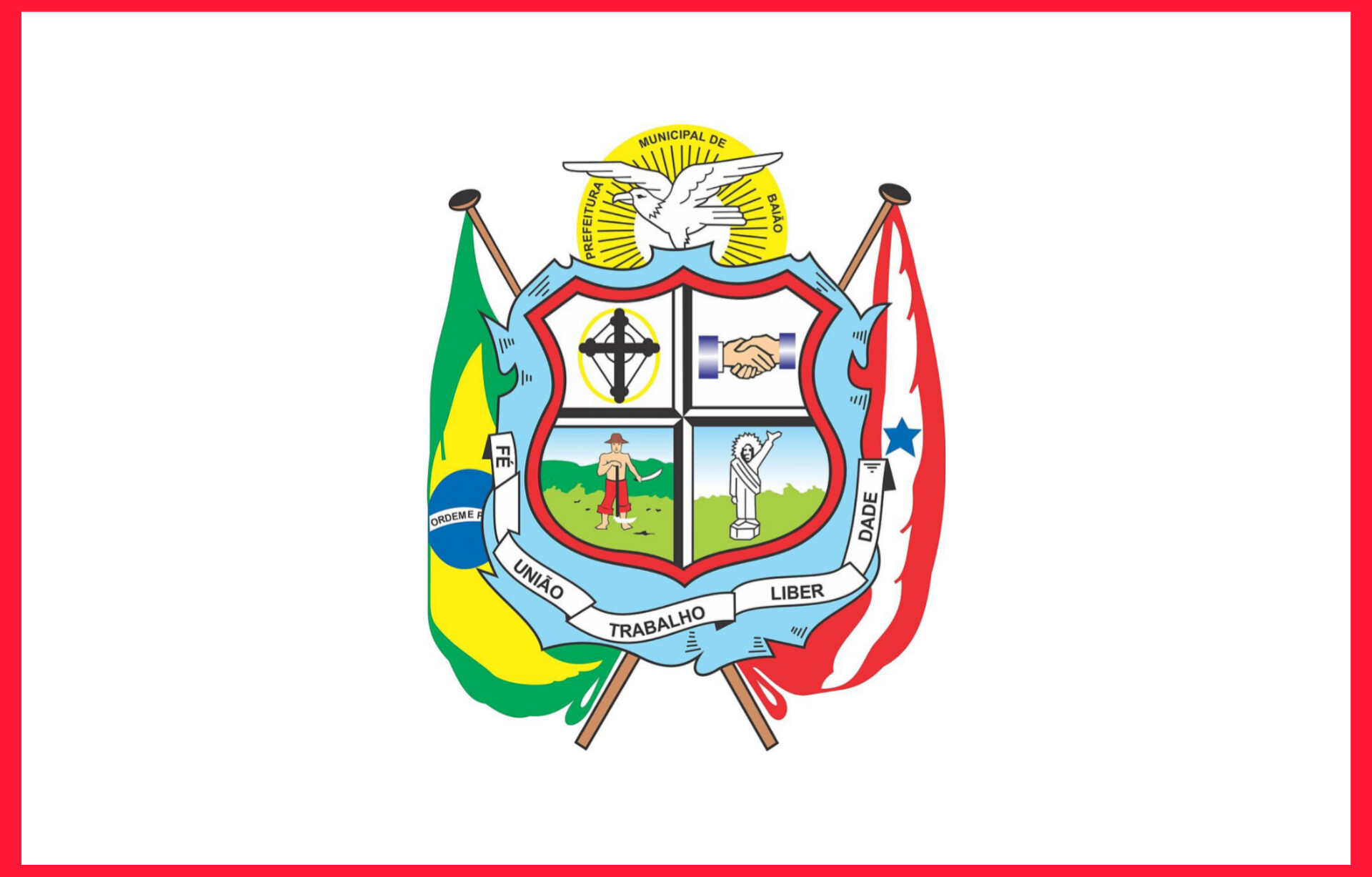
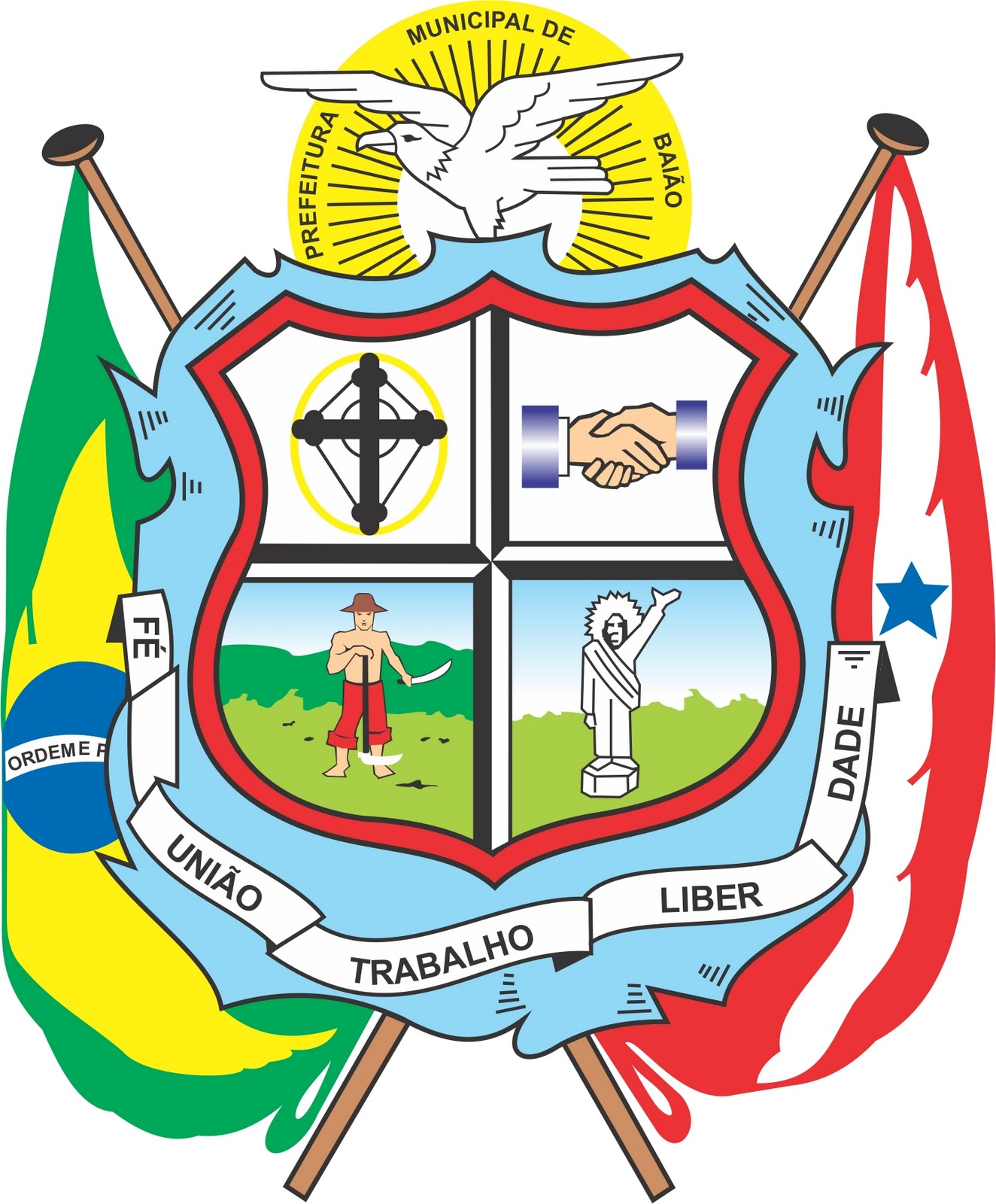
- Flag Coat of arms
- Interactive map of Baião, Pará
- Country: Brazil
- Region: Northern
- State: Pará
- Mesoregion: Nordeste Paraense

Population (2020)
  - Total: 48,459
- Time zone: UTC−3 (BRT)

Baião, Pará is a municipality in the state of Pará in the Northern region of Brazil.

== See also ==
- List of municipalities in Pará
