= Igarapé-Açu =

Municipality in Pará, Brazil

- Municipality
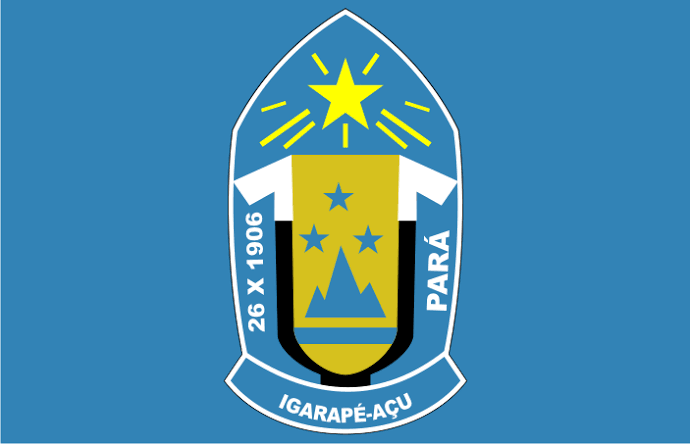
- Flag

- Coordinates: 01°07′37″S 47°37′04″W
- Country: Brazil
- Region: Northern
- State: Pará
- Mesoregion: Nordeste Paraense

Area
  - Total: 303.467 sq mi (785.976 km^{2})

Population (2020)
  - Total: 39,023
  - Density: 120/sq mi (46/km^{2})
- Time zone: UTC−3 (BRT)

Igarapé-Açu is a municipality in the state of Pará in the Northern region of Brazil. The population of the municipality is approximately 39,023 inhabitants according to an IBGE estimate in 2020.

== World War II ==
Igarapé-Açu, a city located in the middle of the Amazon region, not far from the coast of Pará, also had its American base. But this was not about planes, but about airships, popularly known as “Zeppelins”.

Concerned about the sinking of Brazilian ships by the Nazis, the governments of Brazil and the United States decided to cooperate and, among the measures adopted, three operating stations for “blinps” or “zeppelins” (named after the German inventor and company) were installed in the North. brand, which became a common name) in Amapá, Pará and Pernambuco, in a military version. Igarapé-Açu, in the Bragantina area, 110 kilometers from Belém and today with inhabitants, was chosen because it presents geographical and meteorological conditions considered ideal for the landing and take-off of airships, in addition to being connected to the capital by railway and highway.

At the end of the Second World War, residents of the municipality of Igarapé Açu, in Pará, already accustomed to the daily passage of the train that connected Belém to Bragança, began to look at the sky, enraptured, to appreciate the evolutions of the North American balloons that left from the outskirts of the city to patrol the north coast of Brazil, a target for German submarines. The attraction was short-lived, from mid-1943 until the end of the war.

== See also ==
- List of municipalities in Pará
