= Acará =

- Municipality
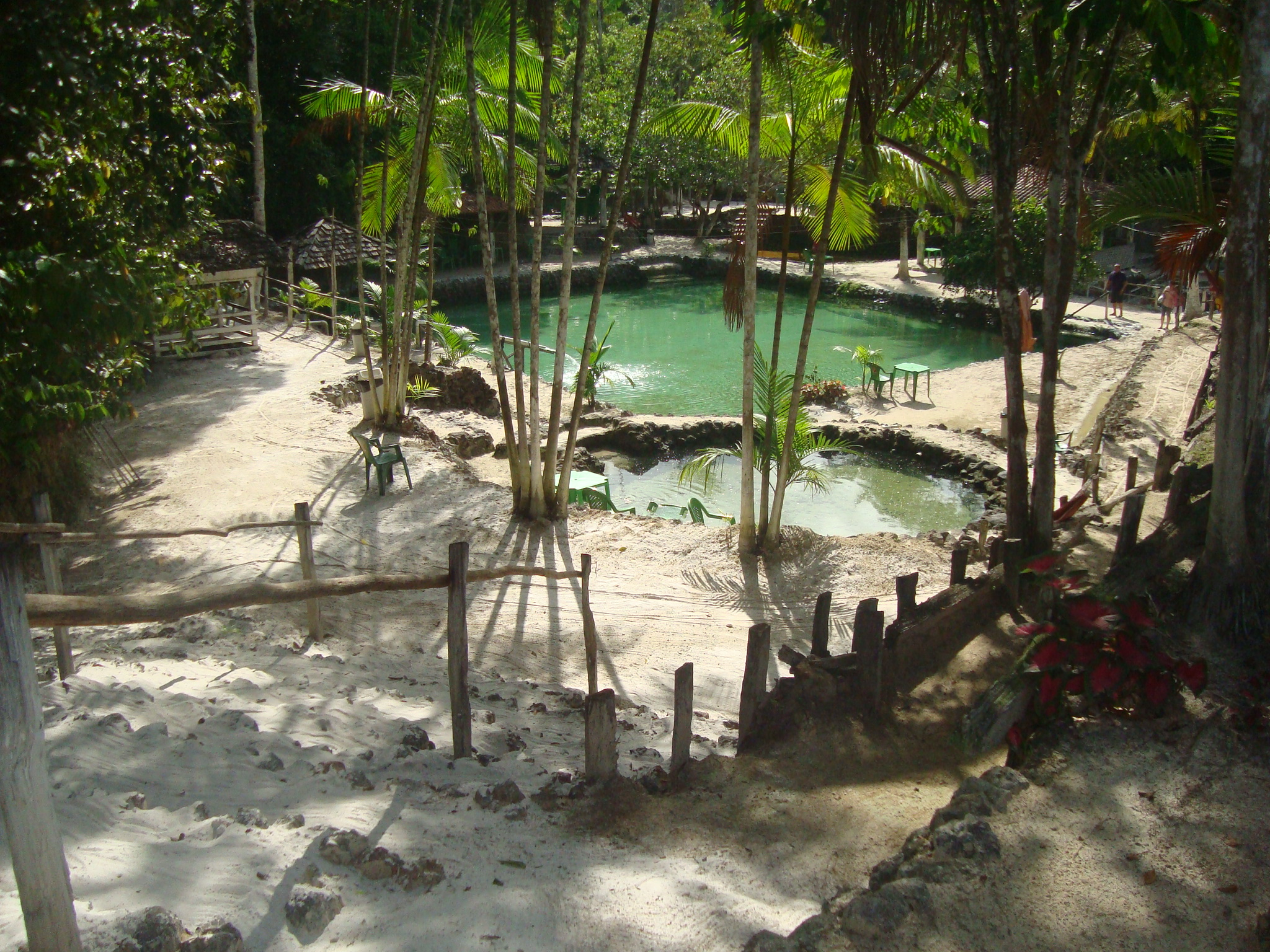

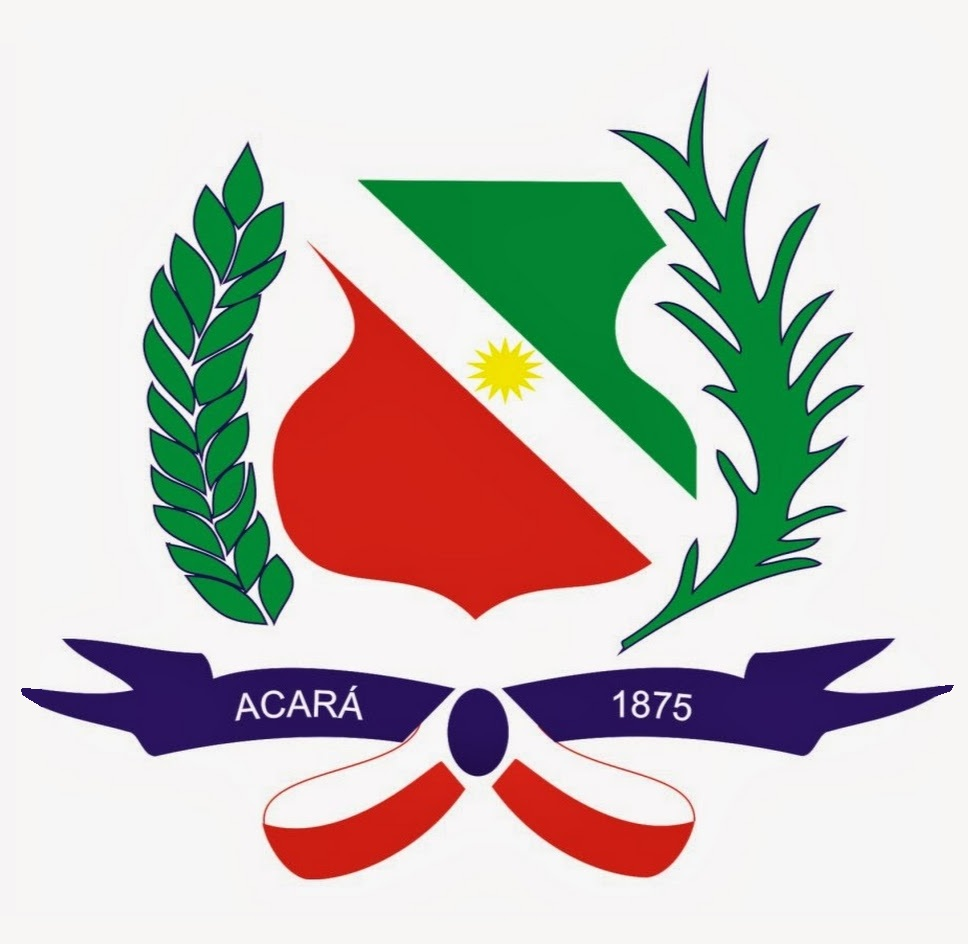
- Flag Coat of arms

- Location in Brazil Acará (Brazil)
- Coordinates: 1°57′39″S 48°11′49″W
- Country: Brazil
- Region: Northern
- State: Pará
- Mesoregion: Nordeste Paraense

Population (2020)
  - Total: 55,669
- Time zone: UTC−3 (BRT)

Acará is a municipality in the state of Pará in the Northern region of Brazil.

== See also ==
- List of municipalities in Pará
- List of quilombola communities in Pará
