= Mocajuba =

Municipality in Pará, Brazil

Coordinates: 2°35′S 49°30′W

- Municipality
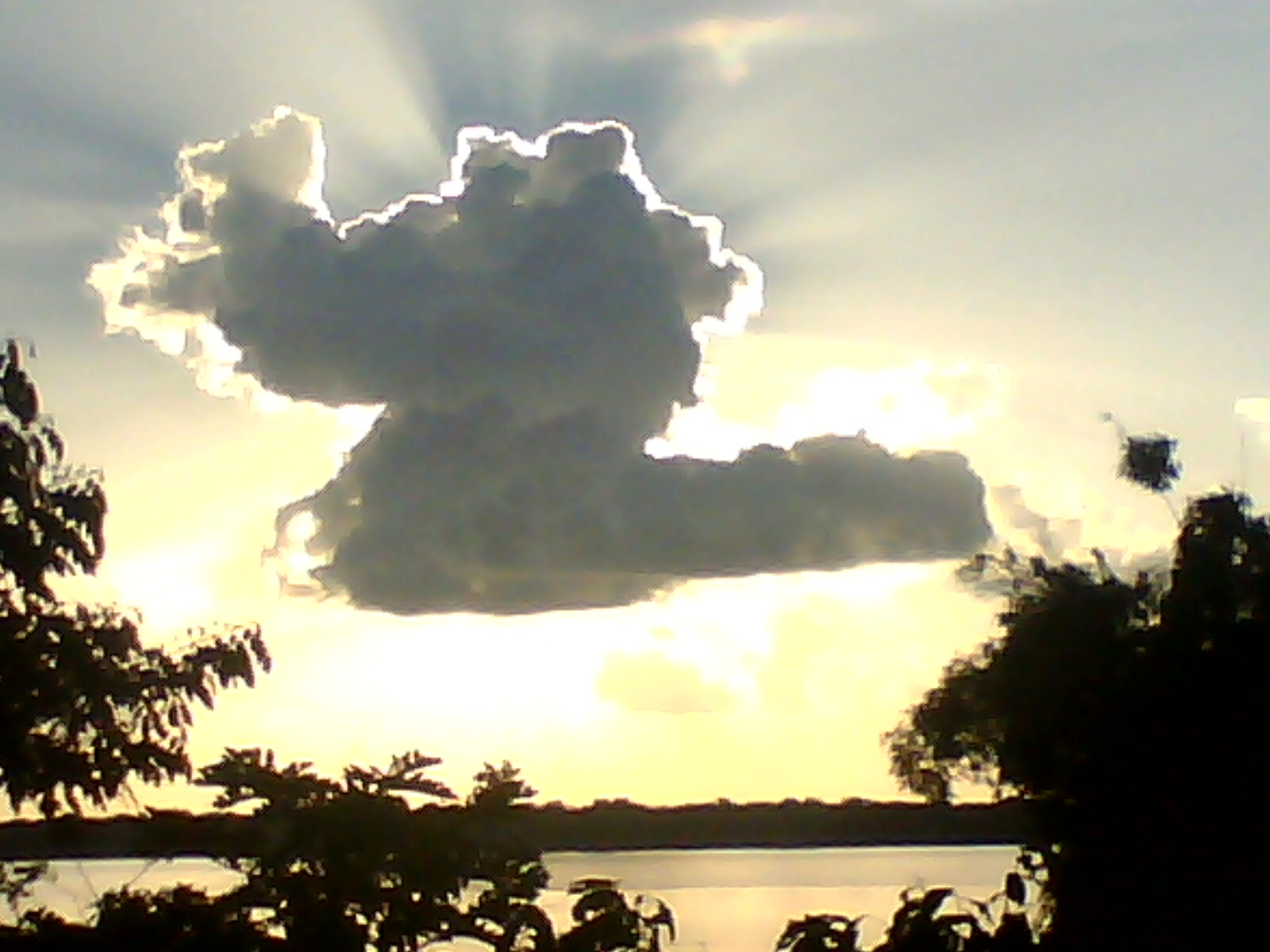

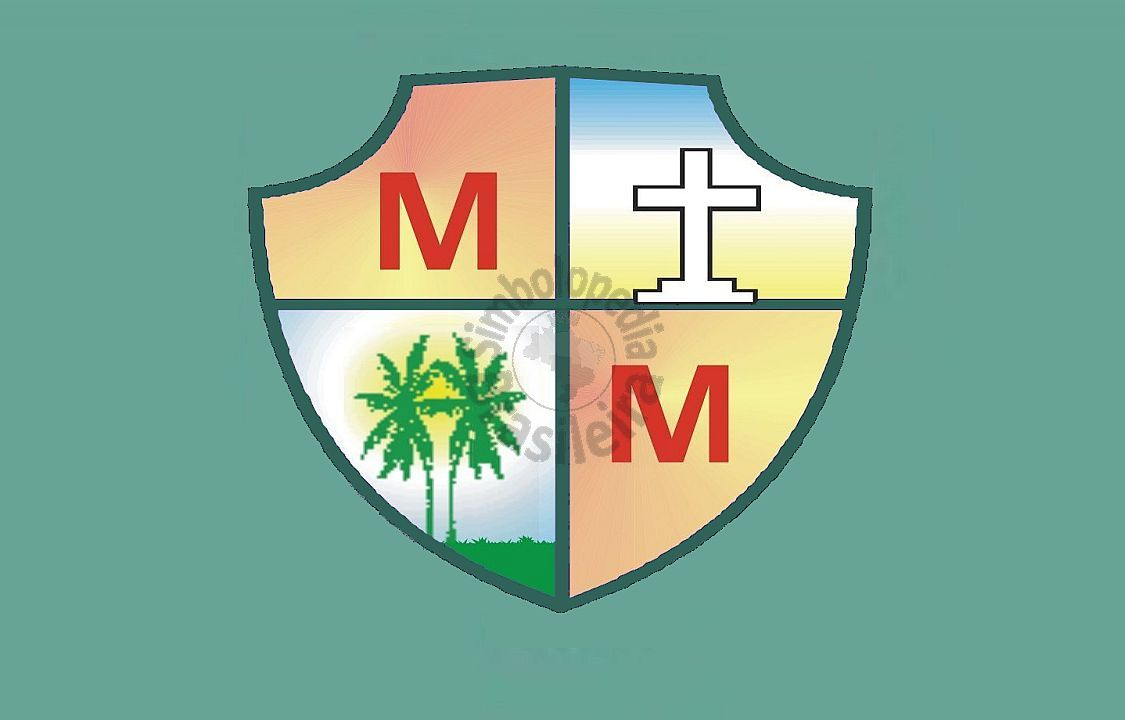
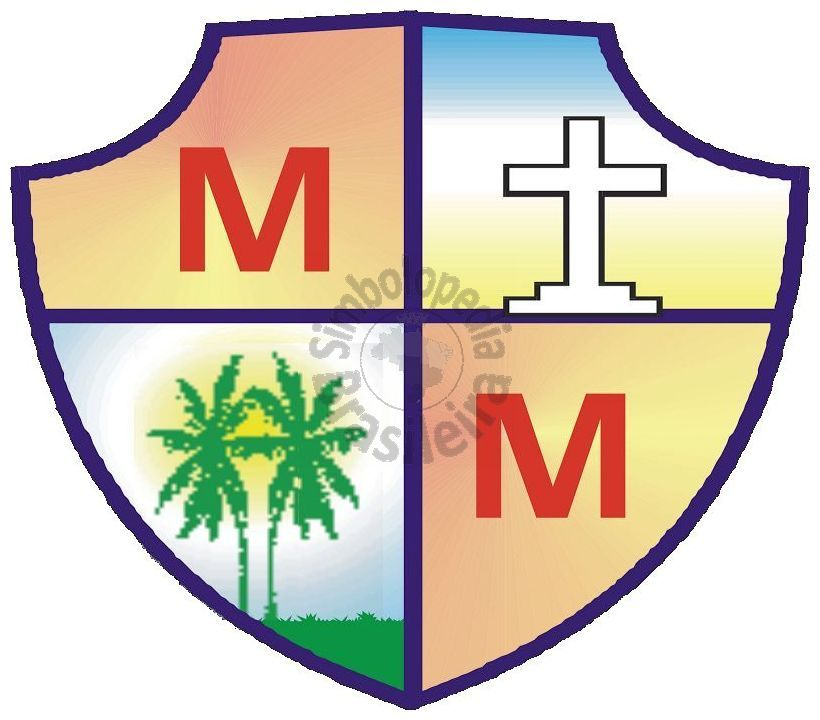
- Flag Coat of arms
- Interactive map of Mocajuba
- Country: Brazil
- Region: Northern
- State: Pará
- Mesoregion: Nordeste Paraense

Government
  - Mayor: Aluisio Valente Vieira

Population (2022)
  - Total: 27,198
- Time zone: UTC−3 (BRT)
- Website: mocajuba.pa.gov.br

Mocajuba is a municipality in the state of Pará in the Northern region of Brazil.

== See also ==
- List of municipalities in Pará
