= Salvaterra, Pará =

Salvaterra
- Municipality
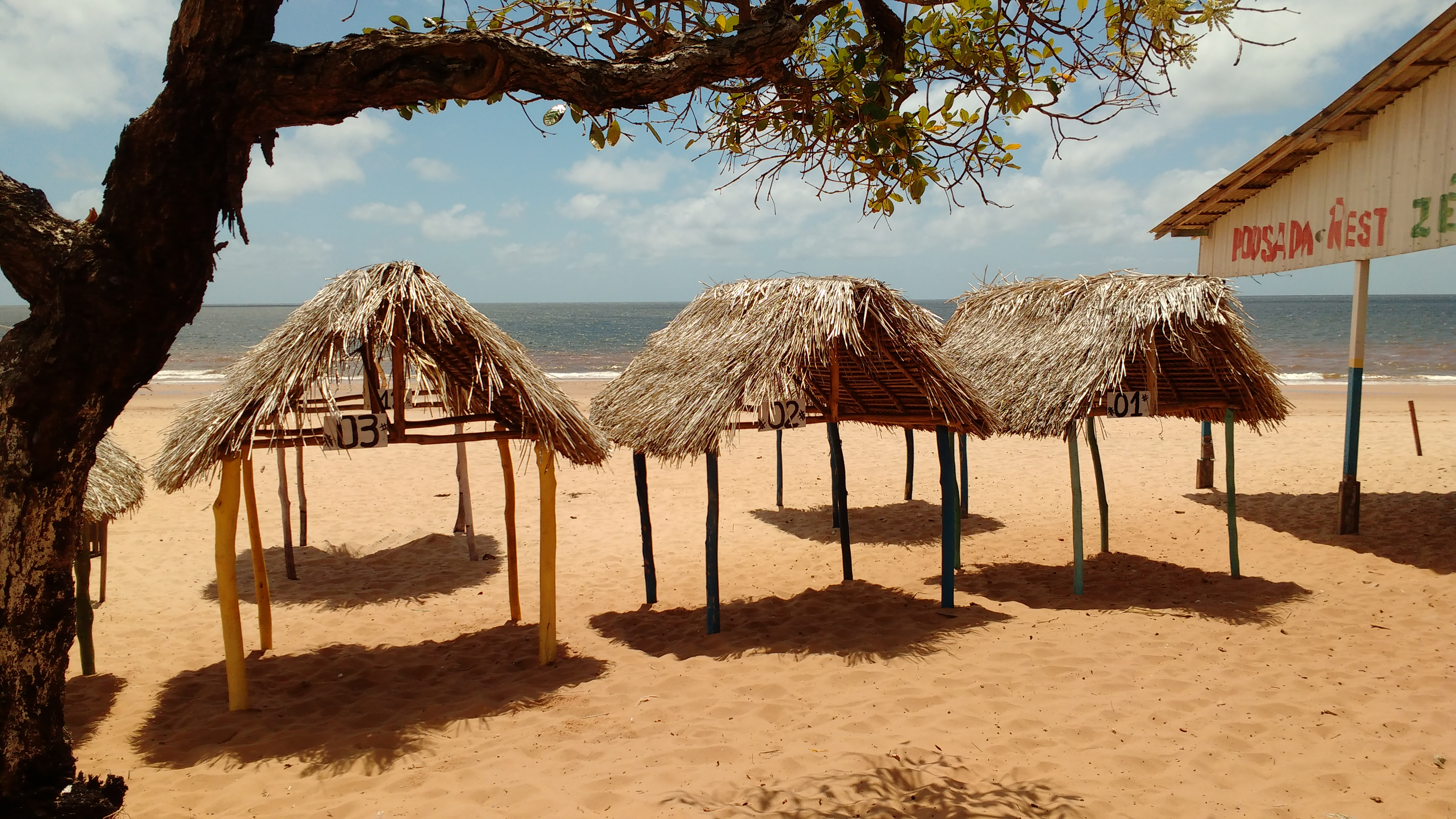

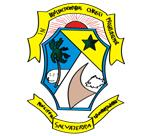
- Flag Coat of arms

- Location in the State of Pará

- Location within Brazil
- Coordinates: 00°45′10″S 48°31′01″W
- Country: Brazil
- Region: North
- State: Pará

Area
  - Total: 1,043.504 km^{2} (402.899 sq mi)
- Elevation: 5 m (16 ft)

Population (2020)
  - Total: 24,075
  - Density: 16.8/km^{2} (44/sq mi)
- Time zone: UTC−3 (BRT)
- Postal Code: 68860-000

Salvaterra is a Brazilian municipality located in the state of Pará. Its population as of 2020 is estimated to be 24,075 people. The area of the municipality is 1,043.504 km^{2}. The city is located in the mesoregion Marajó and the microregion of Arari.

== Conservation ==
The municipality is contained in the 59,985-square-kilometre (23,160 sq mi) Marajó Archipelago Environmental Protection Area, a sustainable use conservation unit established in 1989 to protect the environment of the delta region. The municipality operates the Mata do Bacurizal e do Lago Caraparu Ecological Reserve, a forest area with a lake just south of the town of Salvaterra.

== See also ==
- List of municipalities in Pará

== Sources ==
- APA Arquipélago do Marajó (in Portuguese), ISA: Instituto Socioambiental
- Giovanni Salera Júnior (24 August 2012), "Reserva Ecológica da Mata do Bacurizal e do Lago Caraparu", Mesa de Bar News (476), Gurupi – Estado do Tocantins.
