= São Miguel do Guamá =

Municipality in Pará, Brazil

- Municipality
- Município de São Miguel do Guamá
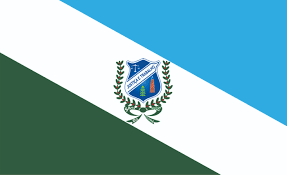
- Flag

- Location in Brazil
- Coordinates: 1°37′S 47°27′W
- Country: Brazil
- Region: North
- State: Pará
- Founded: 1873

Area
  - Total: 1,094.839 km^{2} (422.720 sq mi)
- Elevation: 10 m (33 ft)

Population (2020)
  - Total: 59,632
  - Density: 54.466/km^{2} (141.07/sq mi)
- Time zone: UTC−3 (BRT)

São Miguel do Guamá is a municipality in the state of Pará. It is located at a latitude 01º37'36 "south and a longitude 47º29'00" west, being at an altitude of 10 meters. Its estimated population in 2020 was 59,632. It has an area of 1094,839 km². The city contains the districts of Caju, Urucuri, Urucuriteua and the one identified by the own name of the municipality.

The municipality of São Miguel do Guamá belongs to the Guajarina Zone and covers an area of 1341 km², in the Northeast region, being cut by the Guamá River, from west to east, where, on its left bank, is the seat of the municipality. The headquarters distance 150 km from Belém, being included in the Guamá pole. Its limits are Santa Maria do Pará and Bonito to the north; Ourém to the east; São Domingos do Capim and Irituia to the south and Inhangapi and Castanhal to the west.

== History ==
The occupation of the rich lands known today as the municipality of São Miguel do Guamá occurred around the seventeenth century through the navigations carried out by the Portuguese settlers along the Guamá River. At that time, the government of the Captaincy granted sesmarias to the friars of the Convent of Carmo, in which they founded the farm of Pernambuco. In 1758, Agostinho Domingos da Siqueira donated land for the formation of a chapel where, in the same year, Bishop Miguel de Bulhões created the parish of São Miguel, also known as São Miguel da Cachoeira.

With the creation of the parish and the presence of the vicar at the headquarters, the Mother Church was built and around this, several houses were erected and the place became a village, still a simple parish and so throughout the colonial period.

On the border of the province of Pará in terms and counties, held in 1833, the territory of the then parish became part of the municipality of Ourém. In 1872, it dismembered itself, acquiring the category of Village, already in 1873 the Provincial Assembly created the respective municipality, with the law nº 2,663 of October 31 of 1873, from there, São Miguel left the category of town happening to be municipality.

== Economy ==
The economy of São Miguel do Guamá is based on bricks and tiles manufacturing, in which there are on average about 50 industries, producing about 30 million bricks and 8 million tiles per month, being sold to all regions of the country. The largest industries are São Cerâmica Barreira, Barbosa, Cemil and Kamiranga.

== Education ==
The municipality has one public university, UEPA-universidade estadual do Pará, and other institutions.

== See also ==
- List of municipalities in Pará
