= Igarapé-Miri =

Municipality in Northern Brazil

- Municipality
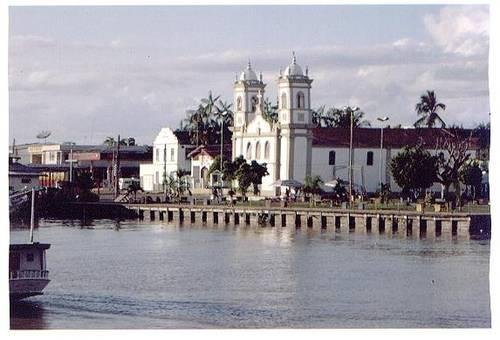

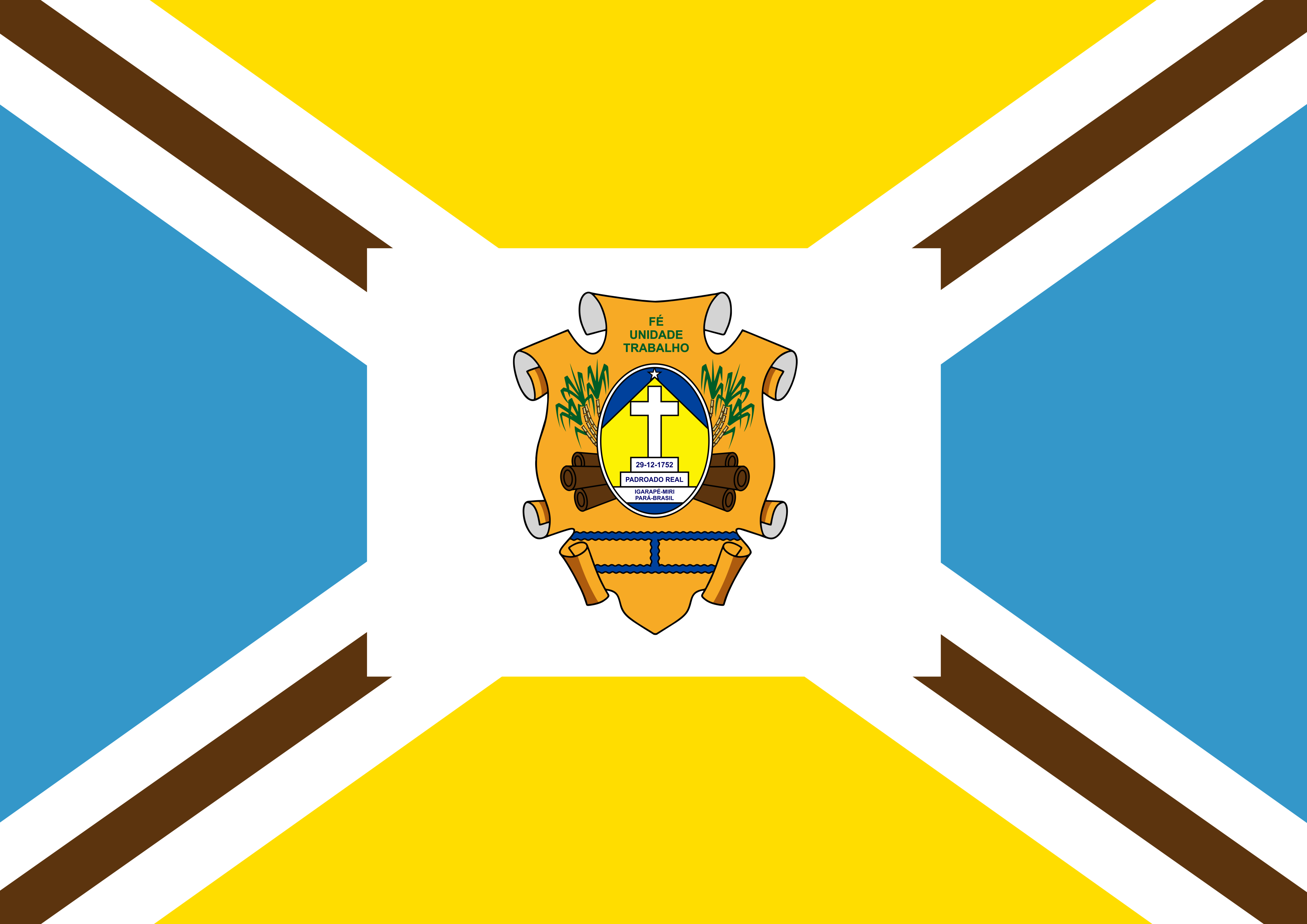
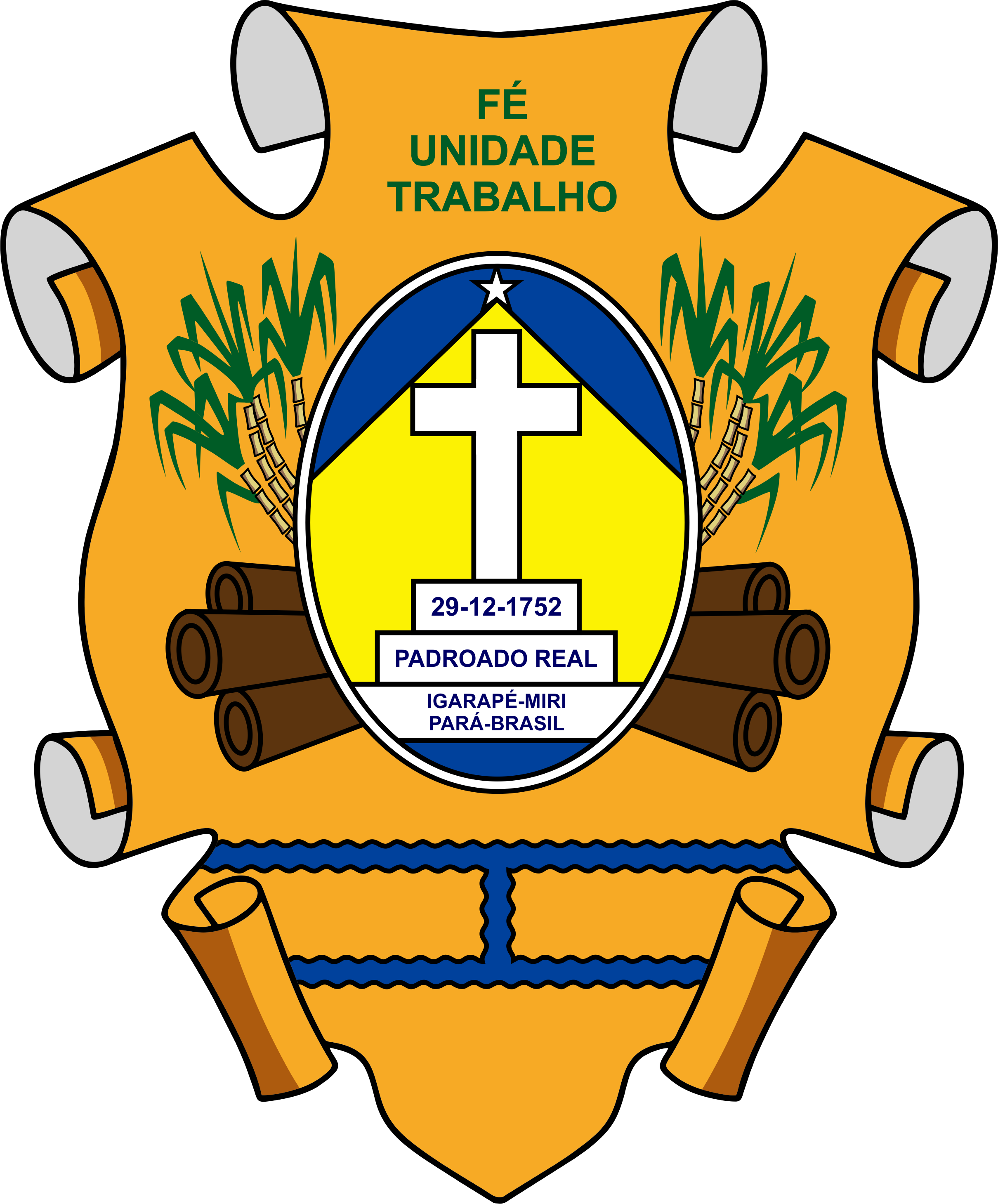
- Flag Coat of arms

- Coordinates: 01°58′30″S 48°57′36″W
- Country: Brazil
- Region: Northern
- State: Pará
- Mesoregion: Nordeste Paraense

Area
  - Total: 770,978 sq mi (1,996,823 km^{2})

Population (2020)
  - Total: 63,036
- Time zone: UTC−3 (BRT)

Igarapé-Miri is a municipality in the state of Pará in the Northern region of Brazil.

== See also ==
- List of municipalities in Pará
