= Abaetetuba =

- City
- The City of Abaetetuba
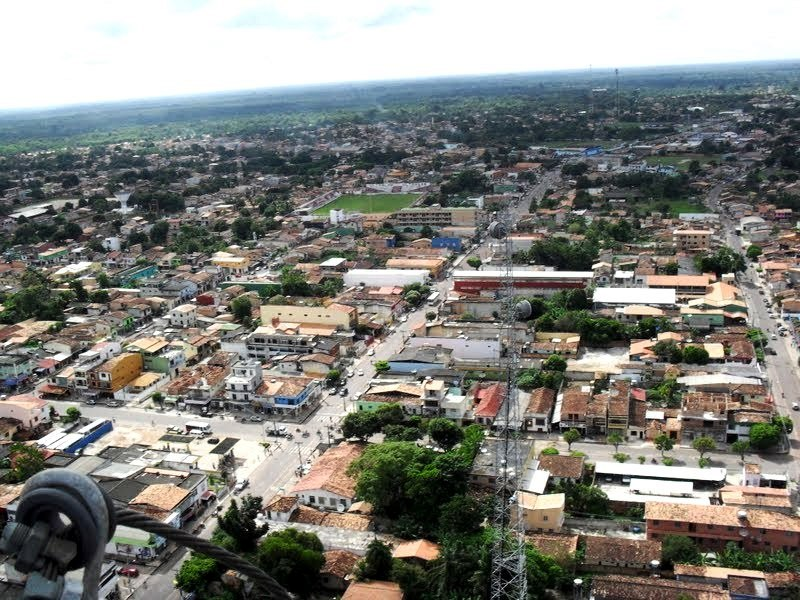

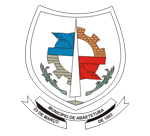
- Flag Coat of arms
- Nickname
- Portuguese: A cidade do Mirití
- Literally: City of Mirití
- Location in the State of Pará

- Location in Brazil
- Coordinates: 01°43′04″S 48°52′58″W
- Country: Brazil
- Region: North
- State: Pará
- First Settlements: 1635
- Founded: 1724
- Incorporated: 1880

Government
  - Mayor: Francineti Maria Rodrigues Carvalho PSDB

Area
  - City: 430.9 km^{2} (166.4 sq mi)
  - Metro: 15,416.9 km^{2} (5,952.5 sq mi)
- Elevation: 42 m (138 ft)

Population (2022 Census)
  - City: 158,188
  - Estimate (2025): 172,344
  - Density: 367.1/km^{2} (950.8/sq mi)
- Time zone: UTC−3 (BRT)
- CEP: 68000-000 to 68400-999
- Area code: +55 91
- Website: Abaetetuba, Para

The city of Abaetetuba is located in Pará State, Brazil. The population of the municipality is 158,188 (2022 Census). It is located in the northern region of Brazil and in the northeastern part of Pará, at a latitude of 01°43'05" south and longitude 48°52'57" west. It lies on the right bank of the Tocantins River mouth. Abaetetuba is the hub city of the Baixo Tocantins Region and the 6th most populous city in the state. The municipality consists of two districts: Abaetetuba (headquarters) and Beja (resort, which was initially the indigenous region of Samaúma).

== Etymology ==
"Abaetetuba" comes from the Tupi language and means "group of true men", from the words abá ("man"), eté ("true") and tyba ("group").

== History ==
First settlements in the region date to 1635, when Capuchin friars originating in the convent of Una in Belém joined a village of nomadic indigenous tribes in a settlement with the name of Samaúma, though later baptized as the district of Beja by governor Francisco Xavier de Mendonça Furtado.

Later, in 1724, Francisco de Azevedo Monteiro, dedicated to the exploration of local amazonian spices and goods, acquired a Sesmaria in the region, founding a settlement on the shores of the river Maratauíra in a location protected from the tides by the island of Sirituba, which would later form the urban center of the current city.

Known then as Abaeté, the settlement was granted the status of autonomous municipality and separated from the capital of Belém in 1880 through law nº 973, Abaeté would later be granted the status of city in 1895 through state law nº 324 and finally change its name to Abaetetuba on 30 December 1943, through decree-law nº 4.505.
