= Concórdia do Pará =

Coordinates: 1.99083°S 47.9489°W

- Municipality
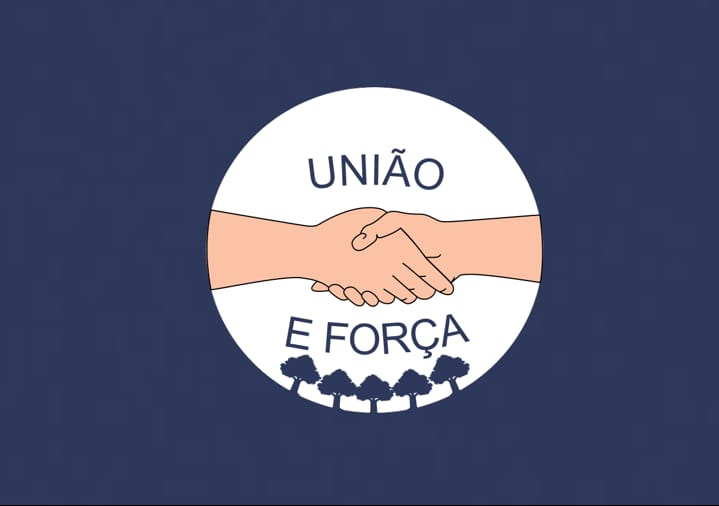
- Flag
- Interactive map of Concórdia do Pará
- Country: Brazil
- Region: Northern
- State: Pará
- Mesoregion: Nordeste Paraense

Population (2020)
  - Total: 33,781
- Time zone: UTC−3 (BRT)

Concórdia do Pará is a municipality in the state of Pará in the Northern region of Brazil.

== See also ==
- List of municipalities in Pará
