= Moju =

- Municipality
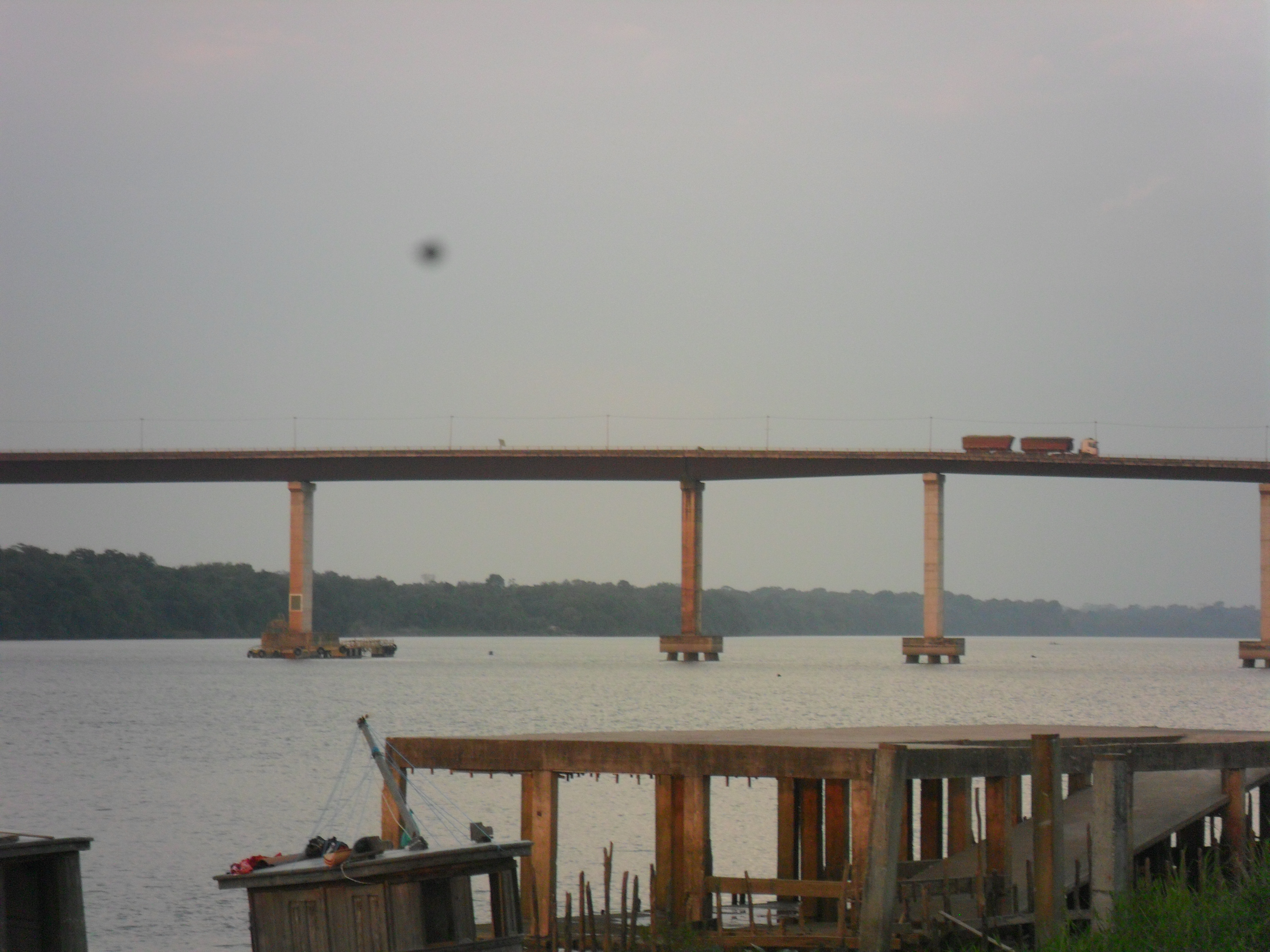
- View if Moju Bridge

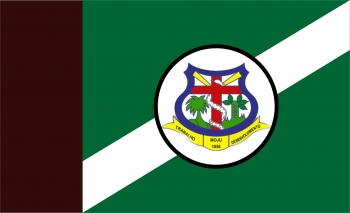
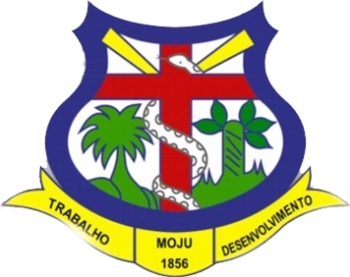
- Flag Coat of arms

- Coordinates: 1°53′24″S 48°45′58″W
- Country: Brazil
- Region: Northern
- State: Pará
- Mesoregion: Nordeste Paraense

Area
  - Total: 39 sq mi (100 km^{2})

Population (2020)
  - Total: 83,182
- Time zone: UTC−3 (BRT)

Moju is a municipality in the state of Pará in the Northern region of Brazil.

== See also ==
- List of municipalities in Pará
