= Federal University of Southern and Southeastern Pará =

University in Brazil

- Universidade Federal do Sul e Sudeste do Pará
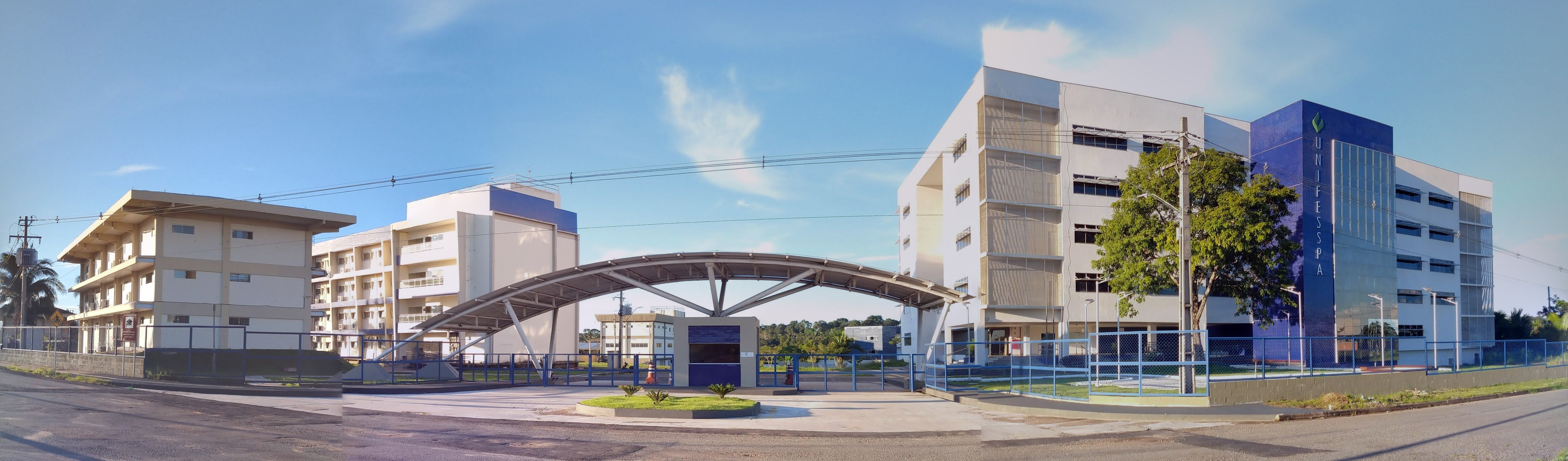
- Other name: UNIFESSPA
- Type: Public university
- Established: June 5, 2013
- Budget: R$ 30 525 000,00 (2014)
- Rector: Francisco Ribeiro da Costa
- Academic staff: 184
- Administrative staff: 110
- Students: 4.096
- Location: Marabá, Pará, Brazil
- Campus: 5 campuses: Marabá (main campus), Santana do Araguaia, São Félix do Xingu, Rondon do Pará and Xinguara
- Website: unifesspa.edu.br

The Federal University of Southern and Southeastern Pará (Portuguese: Universidade Federal do Sul e Sudeste do Pará, UNIFESSPA) is a multi-campus public university, based in the city of Marabá, with campuses in Santana do Araguaia, São Félix do Xingu, Rondon do Pará and Xinguara. The legislation that created the institution was sanctioned on June 5, 2013 by President Dilma Rousseff.

Unifesspa is the result of the dismemberment of the Marabá campus of the Federal University of Pará. In 2018, the institution held a total of 37 degrees; 28 in Marabá, 1 in Santana do Araguaia, 1 in São Félix do Xingu, 3 in Rondon and 4 in Xinguara. It also maintains eleven advanced university centers in Abel Figueiredo, Bom Jesus do Tocantins, Breu Branco, Canaã dos Carajás, Itupiranga, Jacundá, Moju, Ourilândia do Norte, Piçarra, Tailândia e São Geraldo do Araguaia.

Although young, the university tries to construct its identity and vocation, having as main focus the agrarian question, verified in the preoccupation with the courses of Field Education, Agronomy and Law of the Earth, and; the great mineral enterprises, visualized in the courses of Mining Engineering, Materials Engineering and Geology.

In the Folha University Ranking (RUF; in portuguese: Ranking Universitário Folha) of 2019, UNIFESSPA ranked 182 out of 197 universities surveyed, winning, surprisingly, 10 positions since its first appearance on the list in 2016; at RUF, UNIFESSPA's best qualified courses were Chemical Engineering and Agronomy. Its 2018 General Course Index (IGC; in portuguese: Índice Geral de Cursos) was grade 4 (on a scale of 0 to 5); and the best qualified courses at IGC were, respectively, the Chemistry degree and the Bachelor's degree in Agronomy.

== See also ==
- List of federal universities of Brazil
