= Rafael Alves (fighter) =

Brazilian mixed martial arts fighter

- Born: Rafael da Silva Alves; November 14, 1990 (age 35); Belém, Brazil
- Other names: The Turn
- Height: 5 ft 7 in (1.70 m)
- Weight: 155 lb (70 kg; 11 st 1 lb)
- Division: Lightweight; Featherweight
- Reach: 68 in (173 cm)
- Stance: Orthodox
- Fighting out of: Belém, Brazil
- Team: Main street Boxing and Muay Thai
- Years active: 2007–present

Mixed martial arts record
- Total: 35
- Wins: 22
- By knockout: 7
- By submission: 10
- By decision: 5
- Losses: 13
- By knockout: 5
- By submission: 6
- By decision: 2

Other information
- Mixed martial arts record from Sherdog

Rafael da Silva Alves (born November 14, 1990) is a Brazilian mixed martial artist who formerly competed in the Lightweight division of the Ultimate Fighting Championship.

== Background ==
Rafael Alves, originally from Icoaraci in greater Belém, started his athletic journey as a disciplined young soccer player with dreams of going professional. He trained with Yago Pikachu and played for Paysandu's Sub-20 team. However, after a bike accident on his way to soccer practice, Rafael decided to focus solely on Mixed Martial Arts (MMA). He trained in Muay Thai and jiu-jitsu, eventually moving to the United States to further his MMA career. A businessman in Miami helped him secure a fight, and after an impressive winning streak, he caught the attention of UFC president Dana White. Despite the tragedies of losing his parents; his mother to cancer and his father after he was run over by a car, he remains dedicated to helping his family and friends in Brazil.

== Martial arts career ==
=== Early career ===
Alves started his MMA career in 2007 he mostly competed at Brazilian and American promotions, amassing and complied with 18-9 record.

Alves received invite to appear at Dana White's Contender Series 30 where he faced Alejandro Flores. Alves defeated Flores via guillotine choke in second round and earned UFC contract in process.

=== Ultimate Fighting Championship ===
Alves made his UFC debut against Damir Ismagulov on May 22, 2021, at UFC Fight Night:Font vs. Garbrandt. He lost the bout via unanimous decision.

Alves was scheduled to face Mike Trizano at UFC Fight Night 185, however Trizano suffered ankle injury and was replaced by Pat Sabatini. On February 19 it was announced that Alves missed weight by 11.5 pounds over featherweight non-title fight limit, with the bout eventually being scrapped. Alves blamed the weight miss on eating bad salmon the night before weigh-ins.

Alves faced Marc Diakiese on November 13, 2021, at UFC Fight Night:Holloway vs. Rodriguez. Alves won the fight via guillotine choke in first round.

Alves faced Drew Dober on July 30, 2022, at UFC 277. Alves lost the bout via knockout in third round after Dober punched him to the body with left hook and send him to the canvas.

Alves faced promotion newcomer, Nurullo Aliev at UFC Fight Night: Muniz vs. Allen on February 25, 2023. Alves lost the bout via majority decision.

On March 28, 2023, it was revealed that Alves was released from UFC.

=== Karate Combat ===
After winning his first bout in Karate Combat, Alves faced James Vick at Karate Combat 47 on June 29, 2024 and won by a head kick knockout.

== Championships and accomplishments ==
- Titan Fighting Championship
  - Titan FC Interim Lightweight Championship (One time)
- Peak Fighting
  - PF Catchweight Championship (One time)
- MMA Mania
  - 2024 #5 Ranked Knockout of the Year vs. James Vick at Karate Combat 47

== Mixed martial arts record ==
Professional record breakdown
35 matches	22 wins	13 losses
By knockout	7	5
By submission	10	6
By decision	5	2

Res.	Record	Opponent	Method	Event	Date	Round	Time	Location	Notes
Loss	22–13	Luis Peña	TKO (punches)	RCC Hard 21 x Gamebred FC	September 12, 2026	1	3:06	Chelyabinsk, Russia	Gamebred FC Lightweight Grand Prix Quarterfinal.
Win	22–12	Anthony Njokuani	Submission (inverted hammerlock)	Gamebred Bareknuckle MMA 10	May 1, 2026	1	0:31	Miami, Florida, United States	Gamebred FC Lightweight Grand Prix Round of 16.
Win	21–12	Marcos Vinicius	Submission (rear-naked choke)	Peak Fighting 32	October 14, 2023	1	2:25	Frisco, Texas, United States	Catchweight (165 lb) bout.
Loss	20–12	Nurullo Aliev	Decision (majority)	UFC Fight Night: Muniz vs. Allen	February 25, 2023	3	5:00	Las Vegas, Nevada, United States	Aliev was deducted one point in round 1 due to a bite.
Loss	20–11	Drew Dober	KO (punch to the body)	UFC 277	July 30, 2022	3	1:32	Dallas, Texas, United States	
Win	20–10	Marc Diakiese	Submission (guillotine choke)	UFC Fight Night: Holloway vs. Rodríguez	November 13, 2021	1	1:48	Las Vegas, Nevada, United States	
Loss	19–10	Damir Ismagulov	Decision (unanimous)	UFC Fight Night: Font vs. Garbrandt	May 22, 2021	3	5:00	Las Vegas, Nevada, United States	Return to Lightweight.
Win	19–9	Alejandro Flores	Submission (guillotine choke)	Dana White's Contender Series 30	August 25, 2020	2	2:55	Las Vegas, Nevada, United States	Featherweight bout.
Win	18–9	Felipe Douglas	KO (punch)	Titan FC 54	April 26, 2019	2	2:18	Fort Lauderdale, Florida, United States	Won the Interim Titan FC Lightweight Championship.
Win	17–9	Beibit Nazarov	Submission (guillotine choke)	Titan FC 50	June 29, 2018	3	4:30	Fort Lauderdale, Florida, United States	Catchweight (161 lb) bout.
Win	16–9	Guilherme Miranda	Decision (unanimous)	Titan FC 49	April 6, 2018	3	5:00	Fort Lauderdale, Florida, United States	Catchweight (158 lb) bout; Miranda missed weight.
Win	15–9	Rudy Morales	Decision (unanimous)	Combate 16	July 27, 2017	3	5:00	Miami, Florida, United States	Catchweight (150 lb) bout.
Loss	14–9	Jason Fischer	TKO (injury)	WXC 65: College Throwdown 2	October 21, 2016	2	0:50	Ypsilanti, Michigan, United States	For the WXC Lightweight Championship.
Loss	14–8	Vagner Rocha	TKO (leg kicks)	Fight Time 32	August 12, 2016	3	2:36	Fort Lauderdale, Florida, United States	For the Fight Time Lightweight Championship.
Win	14–7	Yoislandy Izquierdo	Submission (rear-naked choke)	Fight Time 30	April 22, 2016	2	2:49	Fort Lauderdale, Florida, United States	
Loss	13–7	Alexandre Pimentel	Submission (guillotine choke)	Fight Time 27	September 18, 2015	2	2:54	Miami, Florida, United States	
Win	13–6	Frank Carrillo	Decision (split)	Fight Time 25	May 29, 2015	3	5:00	Miami, Florida, United States	Return to Lightweight.
Win	12–6	Samuel Paiva	Submission (rear-naked choke)	Jungle Fight 75	December 18, 2014	1	0:32	Belém, Brazil	
Win	11–6	Carlos Augusto da Silva	Decision (unanimous)	Coalizão Fight 4	November 13, 2014	3	5:00	Benevides, Brazil	
Loss	10–6	Bruno Tavares	Submission (armbar)	Jungle Fight 68	April 5, 2014	3	1:45	São Paulo, Brazil	
Win	10–5	Breno Moura	Submission (rear-naked choke)	Jungle Fight 63	December 21, 2013	1	1:43	Belém, Brazil	Featherweight debut.
Loss	9–5	Tiago Trator	TKO (retirement)	Jungle Fight 45	November 15, 2012	2	0:38	Belém, Brazil	
Loss	9–4	Jamil Silveira	Submission (kimura)	Brazilian King Fighter 2	November 1, 2012	3	N/A	Fortaleza, Brazil	
Win	9–3	Renan Silva	Submission (rear-naked choke)	Jungle Fight 40	June 15, 2012	1	2:50	Macapá, Brazil	
Loss	8–3	Neilson Gomes	Submission (arm-triangle choke)	Jungle Fight 39	May 12, 2012	1	3:30	Rio de Janeiro, Brazil	
Win	8–2	Claudio Araujo Neves	KO (front kick)	Icoaraci Vale Tudo	April 14, 2012	1	4:19	Belém, Brazil	
Loss	7–2	Paulo Robinson	Submission (guillotine choke)	Amazon Fight 15	March 22, 2012	1	2:00	Belém, Brazil	
Loss	7–1	Reginaldo Ferreira	Submission (rear-naked choke)	Lenox Fight Competition 3	August 6, 2011	1	2:55	Belém, Brazil	For Lenox FC Lightweight Championship.
Win	7–0	Claudio Ferraz	TKO (punches)	Zero 2 Fight: Vale Tudo	May 5, 2011	2	2:44	Belém, Brazil	
Win	6–0	Joelson Guerra	Decision (split)	Lenox Fight Competition 2	April 8, 2011	3	5:00	Belém, Brazil	Catchweight (130 lbs) bout.
Win	5–0	Iranildo Conceicao	KO (punches)	Jacunda Fight	January 9, 2011	1	3:12	Jacundá, Brazil	
Win	4–0	Arielson Silva	TKO (punches)	Icoaraci Rematch of the Year	December 18, 2010	1	3:06	Belém, Brazil	
Win	3–0	Giliarde Cardoso	KO (head kick)	Goianesia Fight Combat	December 5, 2010	1	2:11	Goianésia do Pará, Brazil	
Win	2–0	José Vagno Soares	KO (punches)	Pepeta Fight Night	October 9, 2010	2	2:26	Tailândia, Brazil	
Win	1–0	Juliano Shanghai	Submission	Balada Fight	September 13, 2007	2	1:23	Goianésia do Pará, Brazil	Lightweight debut.

== Karate Combat record ==
Professional record breakdown
3 matches	3 wins	0 losses
By knockout	1	0
By decision	2	0

Res.	Record	Opponent	Method	Event	Date	Round	Time	Location	Notes
Win	3–0	Khama Worthy	Decision (unanimous)	Karate Combat 51	December 19, 2024	3	3:00	Miami, United States	
Win	2–0	James Vick	KO (switch kick)	Karate Combat 47	June 29, 2024	1	1:24	Orlando, Florida, United States	
Win	1–0	Efraín Escudero	Decision (unanimous)	Karate Combat 44	February 24, 2024	4	3:00	Mexico City, Mexico	

== See also ==
- List of current UFC fighters
- List of male mixed martial artists
