= Bom Jesus do Tocantins, Pará =

Coordinates: 05°03′05″S 48°36′32″W

Bom Jesus do Tocantins Bom Jesus
- Municipality
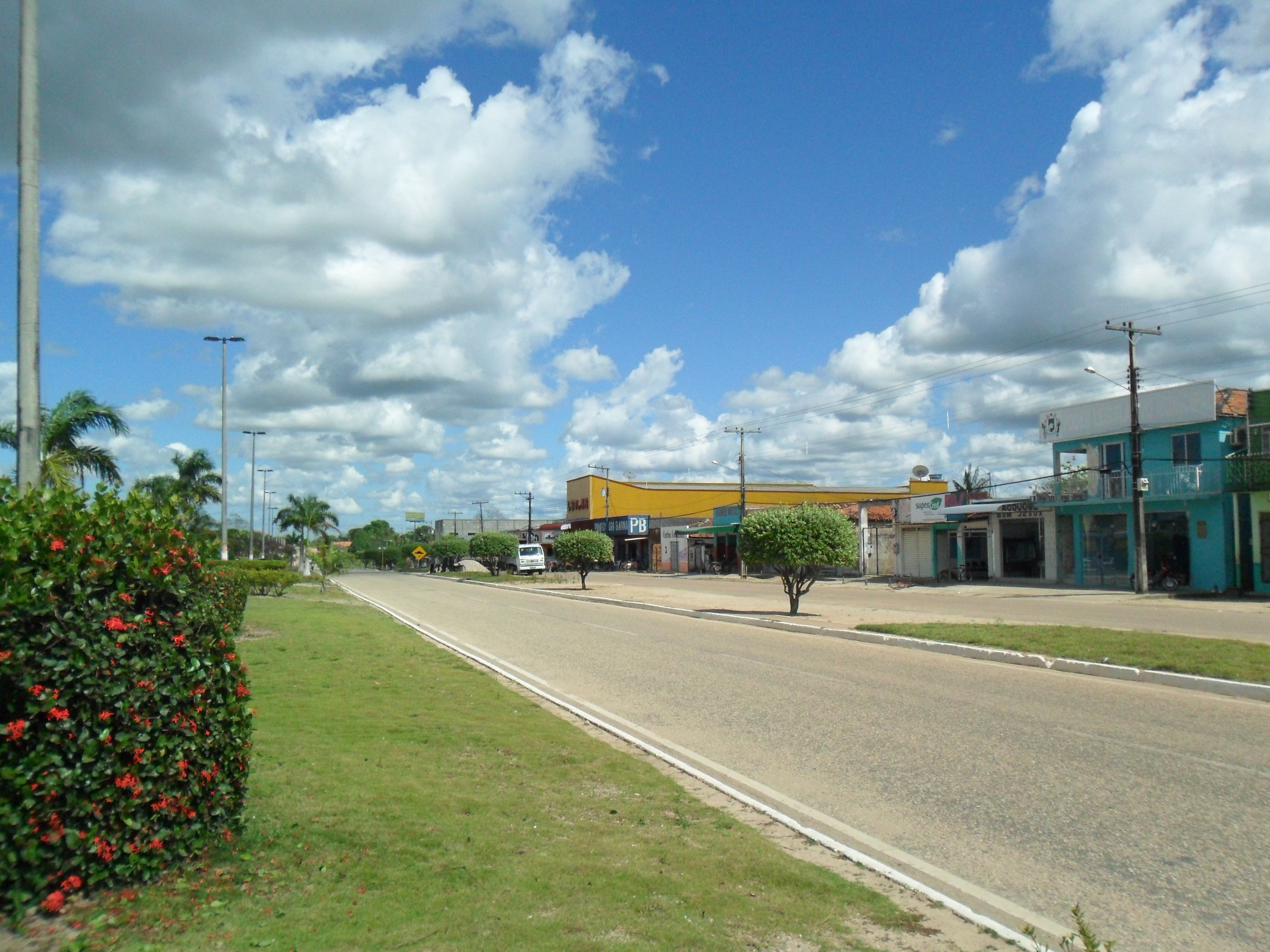

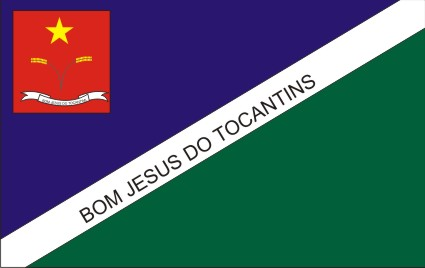
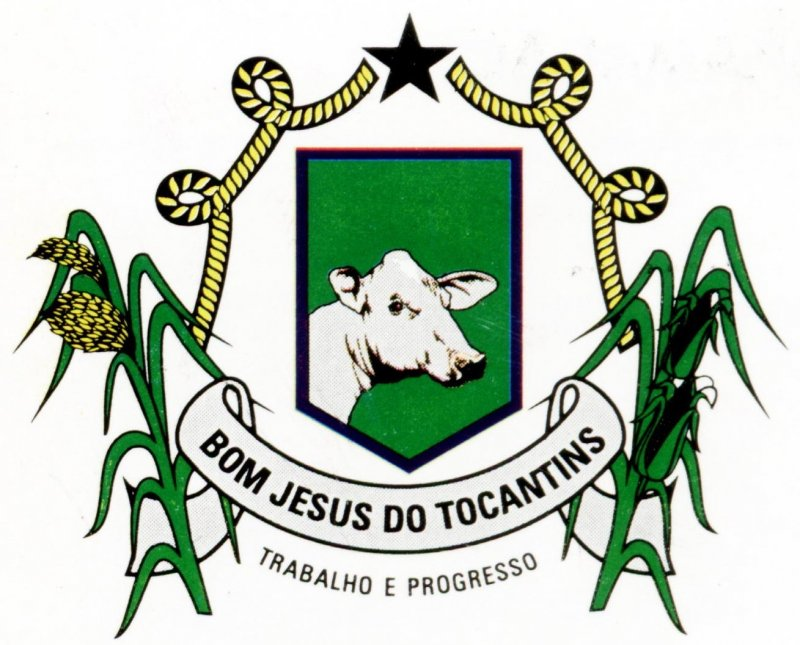
- Flag Coat of arms
- Nickname: Km 66
- Motto: Trabalho e progresso
- Interactive map of Bom Jesus do Tocantins
- Location in Brazil
- Country: Brazil
- Region: Northern
- State: Pará
- Mesoregion: Sudeste Paraense
- Microregion: Microregion of Paragominas
- Neighboring municipalities: Abel Figueiredo, Rondon do Pará, São João do Araguaia, Marabá and São Pedro da Água Branca (MA)
- Distance to Capital: 450km
- Foundation: 1962
- Emancipation: May 10, 1988
- Named after: Senhor Bom Jesus and the Tocantins River

Government
  - Mayor: Sidney Moreira de Souza (2025 - 2028) (MDB)
  - Deputy Mayor: Antônio Nanô de Freitas

Area
  - Total: 1,087.428 sq mi (2,816.425 km^{2})
- Elevation: 574 ft (175 m)

Population (2020)
  - Total: 17,118
  - Rank: 6th (Microregion of Paragominas)
  - Density: 16/sq mi (6.1/km^{2})
- Demonym: bom-jesuense or bomjesuense
- Time zone: UTC−3 (BRT)
- IBGE Code: 1501576
- Website: bomjesusdotocantins.pa.gov.br (City Hall)

Bom Jesus do Tocantins is a municipality located in the Brazilian state of Pará. Its population was 17,118 (2020), and its area is 2,816.425 km^{2}. The municipality was founded on May 10, 1988, after separating from São João do Araguaia city. Located in the Microregion of Paragominas, it is the second least populated municipality of the microregion.

The districts of Bom Jesus do Tocantins, Vila São Raimundo and Vila Carne do Sul are part of the municipality. There is an Indian reservation in the municipality, named Mãe Maria, inhabited by the Gavião people, which are the Kyikatejê and Parkatejê villages.

Gavião Kyikatejê Futebol Clube is the football club based in the city.

== History ==
Prior to colonization, the area of Bom Jesus was inhabited only by semi-nomadic indigenous people. The most prominent traditional people were the Gavião, who have maintained a presence in this area since long before the discovery of Brazil.

Its creation took place in the 1960s, at the time when the amount of vacant land was scarce. Due to the nonexistence of the PA-070 highway, only a handful of people had access to the place. Its history is related to the municipality that eventually gave rise to it, São João do Araguaia. According to local social memory, the oldest resident of the municipality was Adão Alvino de Souza from Maranhão, who established a small farm in the municipality around 1962.

=== Colonization ===
Pioneer Adão Souza, along with his brother-in-law, cleared the forest of the region with help from Galvão Indians, establishing a farm in the area where "Km-66", the current Bom Jesus would later be established. Due to the distance from Marabá, the pioneers decided to found a settlement, mainly to enable the construction of schools and medical posts, also opening a branch line for passenger and cargo transport to Vila Cocal in Maranhão. Thus, part of the land occupied by Adão de Souza was subdivided to form the nucleus of Bom Jesus in 1969.

The first local administrator, Manoel Viagim, representing the municipality of São João do Araguaia was appointed by this time.

=== From emancipation to the 2010s ===
In 1988, a plebiscite was held in Bom Jesus and surrounding areas to consult the local population regarding its emancipation from São João do Araguaia, with the vote being approved by almost 100%. Then through State Law No. 5,454, of May 10, 1988, the municipality of Bom Jesus was created, and on January 1, 1989, the cattle rancher Lúcio Antunes da Silva took office as mayor of Bom Jesus. On the same day, the municipality's legislative power was established with nine councillors.

In 1991, by Law No. 5,708, of December 27, 1991, part of the municipality was separated to create the municipality of Abel Figueiredo, formally its main district.

From 2004 onwards, the region began to profit form the production of Babassu coconut charcoal. The production was mainly sold to the steel and metallurgical industries from Marabá and Breu Branco, producing approximately 56 tons of charcoal every day in this activity. The activity became important after the region prohibits the extraction of wood for charcoal. Alternatively, babassu coconut charcoal production became the most viable and, in theoretical terms, the "most ecological". However the crisis in Marabá's metallurgical sector, from 2010 to 2014 caused the activity to practically disappear, becoming insignificant from then on.

In 2004, brothers Aldenor and Francisco Freitas were killed, they were considered leaders of the largest organized crime organizations in the Brazilian Mid-North. The organization had its base of operations in Bom Jesus, carrying out theft, bank robbery, contract killing, loan shark, etc. The town was under the influence of this organization for approximately a decade, between 2000 and 2010, which even had ramifications in politics.

=== Plebiscite on Carajás ===
In 2011, Bom Jesus and the entire southeast of Pará participated in the plebiscite on the division of Pará. More than 92% of the population voted in favor of the emancipation of the state of Carajás, however the weight of the Belém region prevailed over the local desire and the division was rejected. However, Bom Jesus, along with the municipalities in the region continues to advocate for emancipation from Carajás.

The influence of the proposal of the state of Carajás was so great that in 2011, a bill was introduced proposing to change the municipality's name, through a plebiscite, to "Bom Jesus do Carajás"; it is still under review. The change would help remove the ambiguity that exists in relation to the municipality in the state of Tocantins, which also has the name Bom Jesus do Tocantins.

=== 2012 - present ===
Although it has a considerable indigenous population, the municipality had never elected representatives of the original peoples to any public office until 2012. In that same year the indigenous leader Pepkrakte Jakukreikapiti Ronore Konxarti, better known as Zeca Gavião, was elected counselor with 220 votes.

In 2014, Bom Jesus was marked by the assassination of trade unionist Jair Cléber dos Santos. He was a land reformer leader at the Nova Esperança Camp, on the Gaúcha farm since 2008.

In 2016, acts of sabotage against the system were carried out in the territory of Bom Jesus with the explosion of one of the bridges on the Estrada de Ferro Carajás (EF-315), specifically at the 694th kilometer of the railway, leaving the railway out of operation for three days.

In 2017, the city hall inaugurated the monument to Senhor Bom Jesus, in front of the Senhor Bom Jesus Parish Church, in the central reservation of the BR-222 highway. However, sectarian and extremist Christian groups that were suspected of having links to Pentecostal denominations, considered that the monument offended their faith. In response, they vandalized the monument three times between 2017 and 2018. The monument was restored every occasion, and on the final occasion, it was transferred to the top of the parish church.

Between 2008 and 2018,the municipality recorded about 10 bank robberies in its territory, with entire bank buildings being demolished in some of these robberies. Many of the robberies were led by the soldiers from the Military Police of the State of Pará.

== Infrastructure ==
=== Roads ===
The municipality's main highway is the BR-222 highway which connects the municipality to Marabá in the west and to Abel Figueiredo in the east. Bom Jesus also has access to Maranhão via the Carne de Sol Vicinal Road from Abel Figueiredo.

Nearby the city center, on the BR-222 highway, an unnamed road travels north of the highway to the 1st and 2nd community of Gaúcha on the left, while the village of Santo Antônio connects with the highway on the right.

=== Railway ===
The Carajás Railway crosses the southern part of the municipality, but it doesn't have a station in the territory of Bom Jesus, with the closest ones in São Pedro da Água Branca, and Marabá.

=== Airfield ===
Bom Jesus also has an airfield within the city, with a 1200-meter runway.

== Culture and leisure ==
The municipality inherits northeastern tradition from the large waves of migrants from Bahia, Maranhão, Piauí and Ceará, which influenced the cuisine, music and customs. Bom Jesus is one of the municipalities strongest attachment to these cultural traits in Pará.
