= Goianésia do Pará =

- Municipality
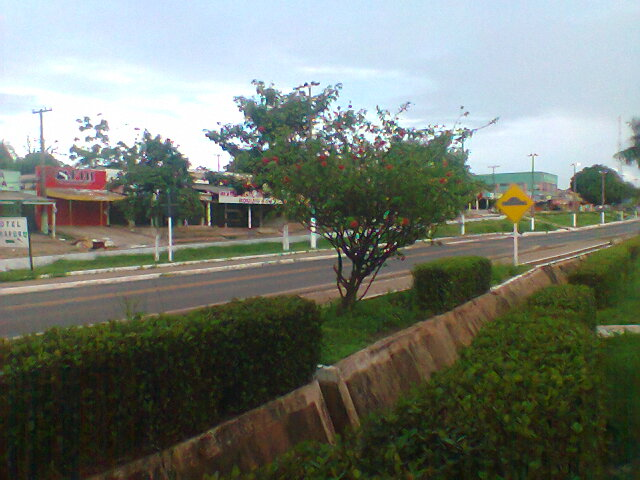
- Bushes in the median strip of the BR-150 highway

- Flag Coat of arms
- Motto: Progresso para todos
- Location in Pará state
- Interactive map of Goianésia do Pará
- Location in Brazil
- Coordinates: 03°50′34″S 49°05′49″W
- Country: Brazil
- Region: North
- State: Pará
- Microregion: Microregion of Paragominas
- Neighboring municipalities: Tailândia, Paragominas, Dom Eliseu, Rondon do Pará, Jacundá, Breu Branco and Novo Repartimento
- Distance to Capital: 335 km
- Named for: Municipality of Goianésia, Goiás

Government
  - Mayor: Eduardo Russinho (2025–2028) (UNIÃO)
  - Mayor's Office: Paulo Sergio Carvalho dos Santos

Area
  - Total: 7,021.191 km^{2} (2,710.897 sq mi)
- Elevation: 103 m (338 ft)

Population (2020)
  - Total: 41,081
  - Rank: 5th (Microregion of Paragominas)
  - Density: 5.8510/km^{2} (15.154/sq mi)
- Demonym: goianesiense
- Time zone: UTC−3 (BRT)
- Website: goianesia.pa.gov.br

Goianésia do Pará is a municipality, and municipal seat in the state of Pará, Brazil. In 2020 the population was 41,081. The municipal area is 7,024 km^{2}. The city of Goianésia do Pará is approximately 103 m above sea level.

== History ==
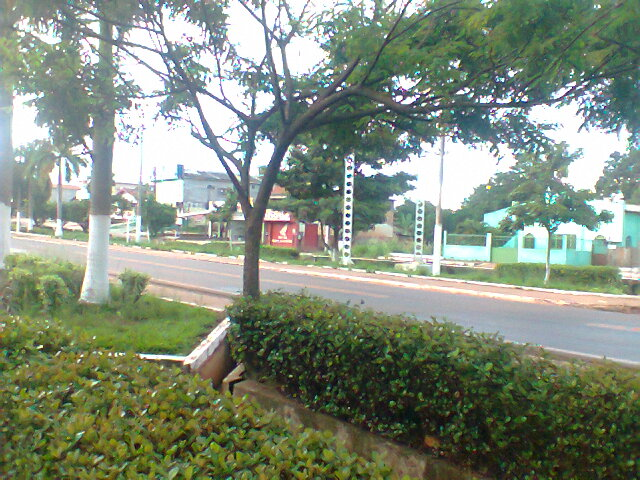
Gardens in the median strip of the PA-150 highway

The occupation of the Goianésia area began in the 1970s with the advent of the construction of the Tucuruí Dam. Penetration into the Goianésia territory benefited from the need to construct transmission lines that would carry energy to Marabá, the iron mines from Serra dos Carajás and roads that would provide logistical support for both the construction of the electrical network and road connection of Tucuruí with the rest of the rest of the national territory.

=== Colonization by immigrants ===
As construction companies opened both the PA-263 and PA-150 highways, several immigrants mainly from Northeastern Brazil and Goiás settled along the roadsides.

In 1977, the PA-263 highway reached PA-150, forming a road junction. A larhe construction site was set up at this junction to support workers on both highways and those building the transmission lines. Immigrants moved there and set up camps next to the construction sites, thus forming the first community with urban characteristics in Goianésia. The construction sites were dismantled shortly afterward, but the immigrant settlers decided to stay in the area.

The site of this camp was part of the Baronesa Farm, owned by the brothers Anésio and Adelmo Guerra, immigrants from Votuporanga, São Paulo, who resided in Goianésia, Goiás. The Guerra brothers donated the land from their property and organized the settlement of the colonists, naming the newly formed village "Goianésia", named after the place of residence of the brothers. The new village consisted of only 12 houses at its founding.

=== Struggle for emancipation ===
In 1986, Goianésia was elevated to the category of district of Rondon do Pará. In the same year, the Associação de Moradores de Goianésia was founded, whose main objective was the political emancipation of the locality. The association organized debates and brought together the class groups that were already fighting for local development separately. Before the organization of the association, the main local articulation body was the Comissão Pastoral da Terra.

In 1988 a petition was launched by the Residents' Association in the localities that would make up the new municipality. The petition was sent to the state legislative assembly and became the crucial point for the approval of the emancipation plebiscite of 1991.

On 28 January 1991 a plebiscite was held in all regions that would comprise the municipality, which confirmed, with 95.83% approval, the desire for emancipation in total, 1,727 voters participated, with 1,655 opting for emancipation.

The municipality of Goianésia do Pará was created on 13 December 1991, by Law No. 5,686, separated from the municipalities of Rondon do Pará, Jacundá, Moju and Tucuruí.

In the municipal election of 3 October 1992, Amário Lopes Fernandes was elected as the first mayor of the municipality. The city hall was installed on 1 January 1993, with the inauguration of the mayor, the deputy mayor and the elected councilors.

=== 1990s and 2000s ===
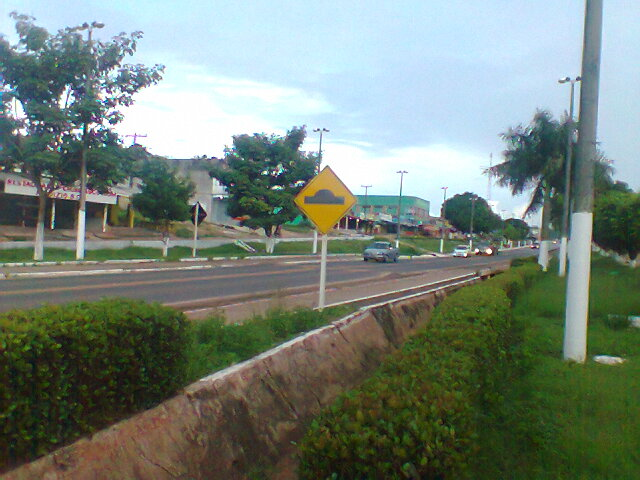
Cars driving along the Paulo Fonteles highway (PA-150) in the center of Goianésia.

The 1990s mark the formation of the municipality, which still had a very fragile economy and was dependent on economic activities related to timber. This period marked the rise of logging activity throughout the municipality, Goianésia became one of the largest producers of semi-processed wood in the entire region, supplying the demand of the international market and the central-southern region of Brazil.

But since 2005 the municipality has been suffering from a crisis in the sector, which has left the municipality in economic difficulties.

=== Plebiscite on Carajás ===
In 2011, Goianésia, along with the entire southeastern region of Pará, participated in a plebiscite that decided on the division of the state of Pará. Since the municipal emancipation, Goianésia has been part of the proposed state of Carajás, so much that the municipality has been affiliated with the main organization fighting for the cause in the region, "AMAT Carajás".

Although the plebiscite in Goianésia shows an overwhelming favorable vote of 85% of the local vote, the weight of the Belém region prevailed, overriding the local desire. However, even with the defeat in the vote, Goianésia along with the region continues to advocate for separation to create the state of Carajás.

== Geography ==
The municipality is in the latitudeof 03°50'30" south and on a longitude of 49°06'06" west.

=== Climate ===
Its climate falls into the semi-humid tropical category, type As in the Koppen classification.

=== Relief, soils and vegetation ===
The soil in the municipality is represented by yellow latosol, red-yellow podzol, lateritic concretionary and slightly moist gley in alluvial areas.

The relief of Goianésia presents itself with modest altitudes, in which its forms are represented by hills, plateaus, flattened surfaces and flattened or dissected tablelands. On the banks of the rivers; alluvial areas such as the floodplains of the Surubijú, Moju and Tocantins rivers. Geomorphologically, the relief is part of the unit that corresponds to the peripheral depression of southern Pará.

The municipality's vegetation is represented by dense plateau forest, dense terrace forest and dense alluvial plain forest.

== Economy ==
The municipality of Goianésia is located in the so-called "Frontera agrícola Amazônica", the largest agricultural commodity producing region in this part of the national territory. The municipality mainly produces meats, cereals, processed wood and semi-processed wood.

The industrial district of Goianésia concentrates most of the municipality's timber industries, as the timber sector was responsible for the city's economic development. Currently, the municipality has over 41 timber industries.

== Infrastructure ==
=== Transportation ===
Goianésia is a major road junction, with its main routes being the PA-150 highway, which provides access to the cities to the south, namely Jacundá, Nova Ipixuna, and Marabá. In the north, the PA-475 which gave the municipality access to Tailândia and Belém. In the east, the PA-263 which gave the municipality access to Breu Branco, Tucuruí and Ulianópolis. And in the west, the PA-151, which serves as an outlet to the rural area of Goianésia, allowing access from there to Jacundá and Breu Branco.

=== Sports ===
The municipality is home to Ginásio Poliesportivo Leandro Martins and Estádio Municipal Almir Gabriel.
