= Abel Figueiredo =

- Municipality
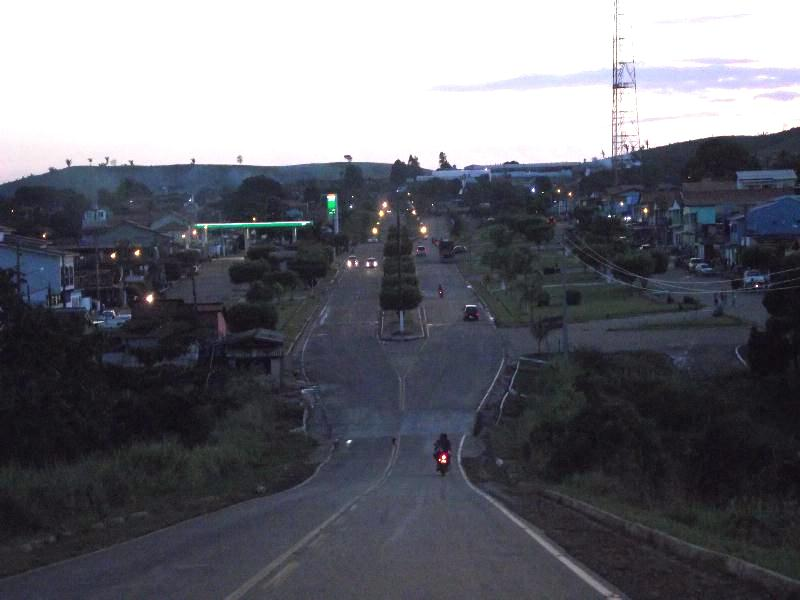

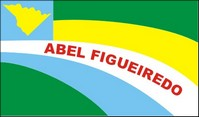
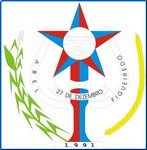
- Flag Coat of arms

- Location in Brazil Abel Figueiredo (Brazil)
- Coordinates: 4.95389°S 48.3928°W
- Country: Brazil
- Region: Northern
- State: Pará
- Mesoregion: Sudeste Paraense
- Microregion: Microregion of Paragominas
- Neighboring municipalities: Bom Jesus do Tocantins, Rondon do Pará and São Pedro da Água Branca (MA)
- Distance to Capital: 572km
- Founded: 1964
- Incorporated as a municipality: December 27, 1991
- Named for: Abel Nunes de Figueiredo

Government
  - Mayor: Marcone Pereira Lacerda (2025 - 2028) (UNIÃO)
  - Deputy Mayor: Aldari Ferreira Alves

Area
  - Total: 237.164 sq mi (614.252 km^{2})

Population (2020)
  - Total: 7,486
  - Rank: 7th (Microregion of Paragominas)
- Demonym: abel-figueiredense
- Time zone: UTC−3 (BRT)
- GDP per capita: R$ 21,361.97
- Website: abelfigueiredo.pa.gov.br (City Hall)

Abel Figueiredo is a municipality in the state of Pará in the Northern region of Brazil. Located in the Microregion of Paragominas, it is the least populated municipality in the microregion.

== Etymology ==
It was named after the politician Abel Nunes de Figueiredo, a state deputy with a strong electoral base in São João do Araguaia, the municipality to which Abel Figueiredo initially belonged.

== History ==
The current territory of Abel Fuguribo was part of the municipality of São João do Araguaia, the settlement was founded within the PA-070 (now BR-222) highway. The construction of the highway attracted groups of people to the region, mainly immigrants from the Northeast of Brazil.

The settlement became a district of São João do Araguiana in 1968, then became a district of the municipality of Bom Jesus do Tocantins in 1988 until its emancipation by Law No. 5,708, of December 27 1991, sanctioned by then govonor Jáder Fontenelle Barbalho. It was separated from Bom Jesus do Tocantins, it became the seat of the municipality, with the status of a city.

== Geography ==
The municipality is located at a latitude of 4°57'14" south, and a longitude of 48°23'34" west, with an area of 614.2 km^{2}.

Abel Figueiredo is located in the Imediata de Marabá and the Intermediária de Marabá geographic region.

=== Hydrography ===
The municipality has four important rivers, namely the Grapiá, Noventa e Sete, Guaraní and the Água Azul.

== Infrastructure ==
The main road that connects to the municipality is the BR-222 highway, which links it to Rondon do Pará in the northeast and Bom Jesus do Tocantins to the nearby city of Marabá in the southwest. One of the important local roads is the Estr. da Carne de Sol, which connects the village of Carne do Sol to São Pedro da Água Branca in Maranhão.

== See also ==
- List of municipalities in Pará
- List of places in Brazil named after people
