= Josivaldo JP =

Brazilian politician (born 1983)

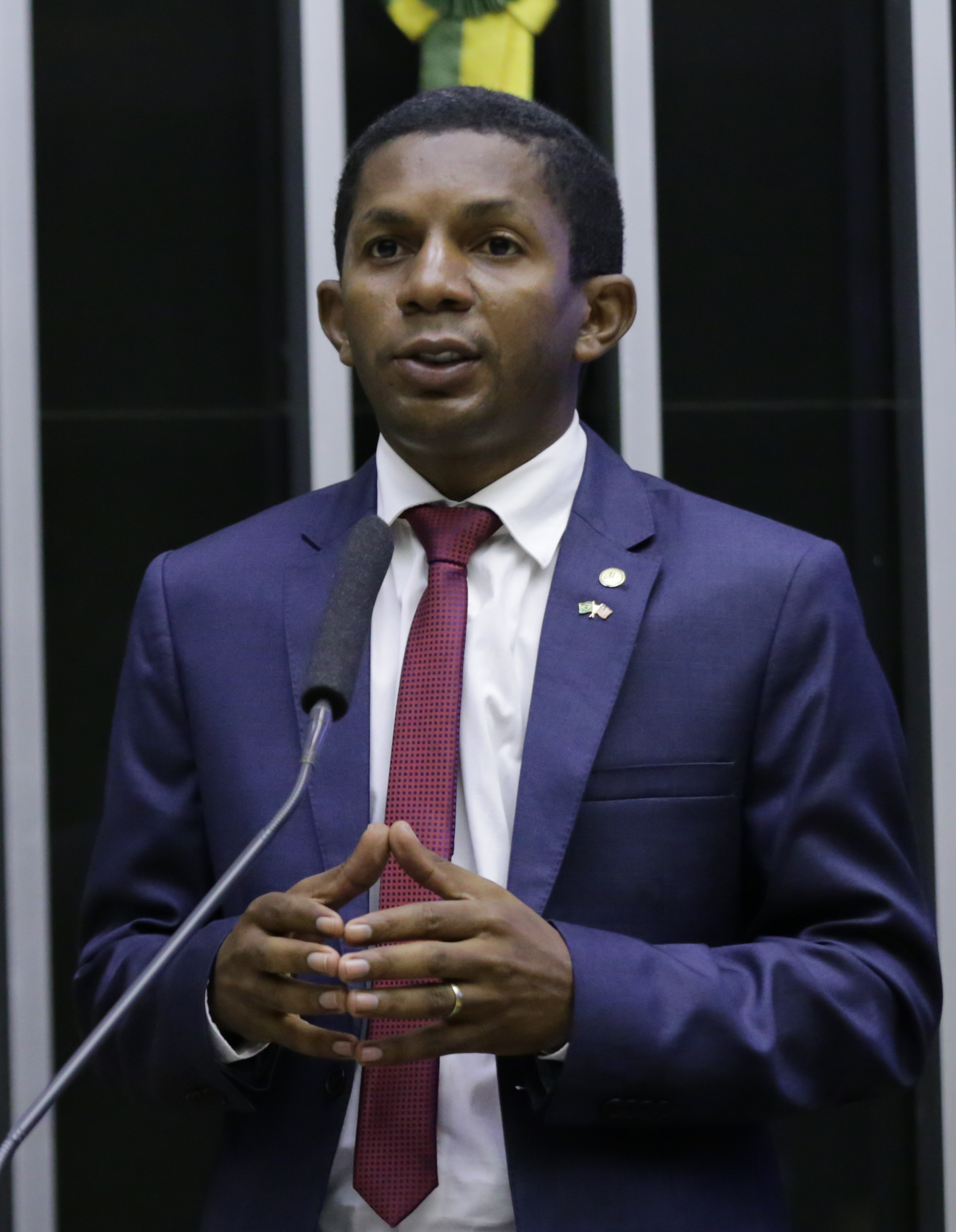
- JP in 2021

Member of the Chamber of Deputies
- Incumbent
- Assumed office 1 January 2021
- Constituency: Maranhão

Personal details
- Born: Josivaldo dos Santos Melo; 29 November 1983 (age 42) Jacundá, Pará, Brazil
- Party: UNIÃO (2026–present)
- Other political affiliations: PROS (2015–2018); PHS (2018–2019); PODE (2019–2022); PSD (2022–2026)

Josivaldo dos Santos Melo (born 29 November 1983), better known as Josivaldo JP, is a Brazilian politician serving as a member of the Chamber of Deputies since 2021. From 2018 to 2020, he served as secretary of economic development of Imperatriz.
