= Grant Dawson =

American mixed martial arts fighter

- Born: Grant Michael Dawson; February 20, 1994 (age 32); Cambria, Wisconsin, U.S.
- Other names: KGD
- Height: 5 ft 10 in (1.78 m)
- Weight: 155 lb (70 kg; 11 st 1 lb)
- Division: Lightweight; Featherweight
- Reach: 72 in (183 cm)
- Style: Wrestling
- Fighting out of: Coconut Creek, Florida, U.S.
- Team: No Quarter Given (2012–2013); Team Viper / Lincoln MMA (2013–2014); Glory MMA & Fitness (2014–2022); American Top Team (2022–present)
- Rank: Black belt in Brazilian Jiu-Jitsu under James Krause
- Years active: 2014–present

Mixed martial arts record
- Total: 29
- Wins: 25
- By knockout: 5
- By submission: 14
- By decision: 6
- Losses: 3
- By knockout: 3
- Draws: 1

Other information
- Mixed martial arts record from Sherdog

Grant Michael Dawson (born February 20, 1994) is an American mixed martial artist currently competing in the Lightweight division of the Ultimate Fighting Championship (UFC). As of October 24, 2026, he is #11 in the Meta UFC lightweight rankings.

== Background ==
Dawson was born in Cambria, Wisconsin, but grew up mostly in Stromsburg, Nebraska. Initially dreaming of a career in American football, Dawson started wrestling to aid his primary sport. After realizing he wasn't good enough at American football, he dropped the sport and concentrated solely in wrestling. He was homeschooled until his teens, and attended Cross County Community School where he competed in high school wrestling, finishing his senior season with a record of 40–8. After graduating from high school but skipping college due to dyslexia, Dawson decided to pursue a career in mixed martial arts.

== Mixed martial arts career ==
=== Early career ===
After compiling an amateur record of 8–1, Dawson started his professional MMA career in 2014. He amassed a professional record of 11–1 prior to participating in Dana White's Contender Series.

=== Dana White's Contender Series ===
Dawson appeared on the first season of the program Dana White's Contender Series 6. He faced Adrian Diaz on August 17, 2017 and won the fight by submission due to a rear-naked choke in round two. With the win, Dawson was offered a UFC contract.

=== Ultimate Fighting Championship ===
Dawson made his UFC debut on March 9, 2019, at UFC Fight Night 146 against Julian Erosa. He won the fight via unanimous decision.

His next fight came on May 18, 2019, at UFC Fight Night 152 against Michael Trizano. He won the fight via a rear-naked choke in round two. This win earned him the Performance of the Night award.

Dawson was scheduled to meet Chas Skelly on January 18, 2020, at UFC 246. However, Dawson was flagged by USADA the second times where the initial flagging was in November 2017 for a residual metabolite of the steroid Turinabol which it was subsequent cleared by USDADA for not able to determine when Dawson had ingested the banned substance, and that resulted in the Nevada State Athletic Commission (NSAC) pulling bout from UFC 246. The subsequent finding from USADA found no evidence of performance enhancement of a re-ingestion of a banned drug. However, NSAC would revisit the matter in July, 2020 to determine to issue Nevada fighter licence Dawson and Dawson would have to undergo testing twice a month. The bout was rescheduled on February 29, 2020, at UFC Fight Night 169 at Norfolk, Virginia. On February 7, 2020, it was reported that Skelly was injured during one of his training session and was forced to withdraw from the event, and he was replaced by promotional newcomer Darrick Minner. At the weigh-ins, Dawson also failed to make weight, coming in at 149.5 pounds, 3.5 pounds over the featherweight non-title limit of 146 pounds. He was fined 30% of his fight purse, which went to Minner and the bout proceeded at a catchweight. Dawson won the fight via a submission in round two.

Dawson faced Nad Narimani on July 19, 2020, at UFC Fight Night 172. He won the fight via unanimous decision.

Dawson faced Leonardo Santos on March 20, 2021, at UFC on ESPN 21. He won the fight via knockout in round three. This win earned him the Performance of the Night award.

Grant was scheduled to face Carlos Diego Ferreira on October 2, 2021, at UFC Fight Night 193. However, Ferreira pulled out of the fight in early-September citing an injury. Instead Dawson faced Ricky Glenn on October 23, 2021, at UFC Fight Night 196. The fight ended in majority draw. 8 out of 11 media outlets scored the bout for Dawson.

Grant, replacing Rafael Alves, faced Jared Gordon on April 30, 2022, at UFC on ESPN 35. He won the bout via rear-naked choke late into the third round.

Grant faced Mark Madsen, replacing Drakkar Klose, November 5, 2022, at UFC Fight Night 214. At the weigh-ins, Dawson weighed in at 157.5 pounds, one and a half pounds over the lightweight non-title fight limit. His bout proceeded at catchweight and he was fined 30% of his individual purse, which went to his opponent Madsen. He won the fight via a rear-naked choke submission in the third round.

Grant faced Damir Ismagulov on July 1, 2023, at UFC on ESPN 48. He won the bout via unanimous decision.

Dawson faced Bobby Green on October 7, 2023, at UFC Fight Night 229. He lost via knockout in the first round.

Dawson faced Joe Solecki on June 1, 2024, at UFC 302. With over thirteen minutes of ground control time, Dawson won the fight by unanimous decision.

Dawson faced Rafa García on October 12, 2024 at UFC Fight Night 244. He won the fight by technical knockout via ground elbows and punches in the second round.

Dawson faced Carlos Diego Ferreira on January 18, 2025, at UFC 311. After landing six takedowns, he won the fight by unanimous decision.

Dawson was reportedly scheduled to face Joel Álvarez on August 2, 2025 at UFC on ESPN 71. However, for unknown reasons, the bout was not formally announced.

Dawson faced Manuel Torres on December 6, 2025, at UFC 323. He lost the fight by technical knockout in the first round.

Dawson faced Mateusz Rębecki on May 9, 2026 at UFC 328. He won the fight via a guillotine choke in round three.

Dawson faced Nurullo Aliev on October 24, 2026 at UFC 333. After Aliev was deducted one point due to illegal blows to the back of the head, Dawson won the fight by unanimous decision.

== Championships and accomplishments ==
=== Mixed martial arts ===
- Ultimate Fighting Championship
  - Performance of the Night (Two times) vs. Michael Trizano and Leonardo Santos
  - Second highest control time percentage in UFC Lightweight division history (63.3%)
  - Highest top-position percentage in UFC Lightweight division history (55.8%)
  - Second most top-position time in UFC Lightweight division history (1:18:31) (behind Clay Guida)
  - Fifth most control time in UFC Lightweight division history (1:29:01)
  - UFC.com Awards
    - 2019: Ranked #4 Newcomer of the Year

== Mixed martial arts record ==
Professional record breakdown
29 matches	25 wins	3 losses
By knockout	5	3
By submission	14	0
By decision	6	0
Draws	1	

Res.	Record	Opponent	Method	Event	Date	Round	Time	Location	Notes
Win	25–3–1	Nurullo Aliev	Decision (unanimous)	UFC 333	October 24, 2026	3	5:00	Abu Dhabi, United Arab Emirates	Aliev was deducted one point in round 1 due to illegal strikes to the back of the head.
Win	24–3–1	Mateusz Rębecki	Submission (rear-naked choke)	UFC 328	May 9, 2026	3	4:42	Newark, New Jersey, United States	
Loss	23–3–1	Manuel Torres	TKO (punches)	UFC 323	December 6, 2025	1	2:25	Las Vegas, Nevada, United States	
Win	23–2–1	Carlos Diego Ferreira	Decision (unanimous)	UFC 311	January 18, 2025	3	5:00	Inglewood, California, United States	
Win	22–2–1	Rafa García	TKO (elbows and punches)	UFC Fight Night: Royval vs. Taira	October 12, 2024	2	1:42	Las Vegas, Nevada, United States	
Win	21–2–1	Joe Solecki	Decision (unanimous)	UFC 302	June 1, 2024	3	5:00	Newark, New Jersey, United States	
Loss	20–2–1	Bobby Green	KO (punches)	UFC Fight Night: Dawson vs. Green	October 7, 2023	1	0:33	Las Vegas, Nevada, United States	
Win	20–1–1	Damir Ismagulov	Decision (unanimous)	UFC on ESPN: Strickland vs. Magomedov	July 1, 2023	3	5:00	Las Vegas, Nevada, United States	
Win	19–1–1	Mark Madsen	Submission (rear-naked choke)	UFC Fight Night: Rodriguez vs. Lemos	November 5, 2022	3	2:05	Las Vegas, Nevada, United States	Catchweight (157.5 lb) bout; Dawson missed weight.
Win	18–1–1	Jared Gordon	Submission (rear-naked choke)	UFC on ESPN: Font vs. Vera	April 30, 2022	3	4:11	Las Vegas, Nevada, United States	
Draw	17–1–1	Ricky Glenn	Draw (majority)	UFC Fight Night: Costa vs. Vettori	October 23, 2021	3	5:00	Las Vegas, Nevada, United States	
Win	17–1	Leonardo Santos	KO (punches)	UFC on ESPN: Brunson vs. Holland	March 20, 2021	3	4:59	Las Vegas, Nevada, United States	Return to Lightweight. Performance of the Night.
Win	16–1	Nad Narimani	Decision (unanimous)	UFC Fight Night: Figueiredo vs. Benavidez 2	July 19, 2020	3	5:00	Abu Dhabi, United Arab Emirates	Catchweight (150 lb) bout.
Win	15–1	Darrick Minner	Submission (rear-naked choke)	UFC Fight Night: Benavidez vs. Figueiredo	February 29, 2020	2	1:38	Norfolk, Virginia, United States	Catchweight (149.5 lb) bout; Dawson missed weight.
Win	14–1	Michael Trizano	Submission (rear-naked choke)	UFC Fight Night: dos Anjos vs. Lee	May 18, 2019	2	2:27	Rochester, New York, United States	Performance of the Night.
Win	13–1	Julian Erosa	Decision (unanimous)	UFC Fight Night: Lewis vs. dos Santos	March 9, 2019	3	5:00	Wichita, Kansas, United States	
Win	12–1	Adrian Diaz	Submission (rear-naked choke)	Dana White's Contender Series 1	August 17, 2017	2	1:15	Las Vegas, Nevada, United States	
Win	11–1	Mike Plazola	Submission (triangle choke)	Kansas City Fighting Alliance 20	October 1, 2016	1	3:49	Independence, Missouri, United States	Return to Featherweight.
Win	10–1	Christian Camp	TKO (elbows and punches)	Victory FC 52	July 16, 2016	2	1:43	Omaha, Nebraska, United States	
Loss	9–1	Hugh Pulley	TKO (elbows)	Kansas City Fighting Alliance 18	April 30, 2016	1	0:35	Independence, Missouri, United States	
Win	9–0	Robert Washington	TKO (punches)	Titan FC 37	March 4, 2016	2	2:08	Ridgefield, Washington, United States	
Win	8–0	Bryce Logan	TKO (punches)	Victory FC 47	January 29, 2016	2	3:12	Omaha, Nebraska, United States	Return to Lightweight.
Win	7–0	Andrew Carrillo	Submission (rear-naked choke)	Kansas City Fighting Alliance 15	August 15, 2015	1	3:21	Grandview, Missouri, United States	Won the KCFA Featherweight Tournament.
Win	6–0	Danny Tims	Submission (rear-naked choke)	Kansas City Fighting Alliance 15	August 15, 2015	1	4:15	Grandview, Missouri, United States	Return to Featherweight. KCFA Featherweight Tournament Semifinal.
Win	5–0	Chris McDaniel	Submission (rear-naked choke)	ShoFIGHT MMA: Branson Brawl	May 9, 2015	1	4:07	Branson, Missouri, United States	
Win	4–0	James Smith	Submission (rear-naked choke)	Victory FC 45	April 4, 2015	1	2:30	Ralston, Nebraska, United States	Return to Lightweight.
Win	3–0	Adam Rider	Submission (rear-naked choke)	Shamrock FC: Heavy Artillery	March 7, 2015	1	1:45	Kansas City, Missouri, United States	Featherweight debut; Dawson missed weight (149 lb).
Win	2–0	Matt Williams	Submission (armbar)	Dynasty Combat Sports 12	December 5, 2014	1	2:29	Lincoln, Nebraska, United States	
Win	1–0	Jeremiah Denson	Submission (rear-naked choke)	Omaha Fight Club 100	August 24, 2014	2	2:29	Omaha, Nebraska, United States	Lightweight debut.

== See also ==
- List of current UFC fighters
- List of Dana White's Contender Series alumni
- List of male mixed martial artists
