= Casa da Cultura de Marabá Foundation =

Brazilian research institution

The Casa da Cultura de Marabá Foundation (FCCM) is a research institution and a historical-environmental preservation organization headquartered in the municipality of Marabá, Brazil. Maintained by the municipality of Marabá, its primary activity is the research and historical preservation of the region, making it the largest and most well-structured institution of its kind in southeastern Pará. In addition to research, it functions as a historical, anthropological, and natural museum, as well as a school.

It is one of the most respected institutions in the North and Northeast of Brazil in the field of research, historical preservation, and environmental conservation. The director of the foundation is lawyer and political scientist Thaís Lucena Cariello Martins.

== History ==
FCCM emerged in 1982 with the creation of the Marabá Ecological Group (GEMA). GEMA was organized due to concerns over the major transformations expected in the region with the implementation of the Grande Carajás Project (PGC). The large-scale projects of PGC indicated a critical and alert scenario for the preservation of regional memory.

The formation of GEMA was cemented thanks to the presence of university professors and research and extension technicians from the "Advanced Campus of the University of São Paulo" in Marabá, the CAUSP (currently UNIFESSPA). The presence of these professionals played a fundamental role in directly collaborating and encouraging the creation of the foundation, the main research institution and historical preservation entity in the region. The founder and former director of FCCM, Noé von Atzingen, was one of the coordinators of CAUSP.

Research on the environment and anthropology required an adequate space for development. Thus, on 15 November 1984 the mayor of Marabá, Bosco Jadão, transformed GEMA into the Casa da Cultura de Marabá Foundation, giving it new responsibilities and establishing it at the José Mendonça Vergulino school (where it was headquartered). The location where its current headquarters stands, on Avenue VE-2 in Nova Marabá, was donated to the institution in 1987 by CVRD (currently Vale S.A.). The institution was formally established by Municipal Law No. 9.271 on 28 December 1987.

Following its creation, FCCM expanded its activities to collect materials from both tangible and intangible culture, further expanding its collection and safeguarding the memory not only of Marabá but of the entire region.

After more than 35 years associated with FCCM (counting from GEMA), Noé Carlos Barbosa von Atzingen was replaced as head of the institution by Vanda Regia Americo Gomes. Vanda Américo was later succeeded by archaeologist Marlon Prado.

== Characteristics ==
As a research institution primarily focused on historical preservation, FCCM is subdivided into various sectors. As part of its historical and social preservation project, it maintains a music school and the municipal public archive.

It consists of the following departments: Historical Heritage, Library Department, Municipal Museum, Music School, Administration, and Cultural Promotion.

The FCCM receives support and guidance from the Goeldi Museum, particularly in training technicians and identifying materials. It also collaborates with the Federal University of the South and Southeast of Pará (UNIFESSPA) and the State University of Pará (UEPA) in personnel training, exchanging research information, and the treatment and conservation of scientific findings.

As a historical, natural, and anthropological museum, the FCCM encompasses the following sectors:

1. Anthropology;
1. Archaeology and ethnology;
1. Botany;
1. Geology and speleology;
1. Zoology.

The FCCM also maintains the Pedro Morbach Art Gallery, a collection of regional artistic works and a significant repository of techniques such as the Amazonian ink wash, an artistic style with strong influence in Marabá. Since the repurposing of the Palacete Augusto Dias building as the "Francisco Coelho Historical Municipal Museum," the FCCM has managed the space, transferring its historical museum functions there (previously housed in the Aldeias da Cultura buildings at the FCCM headquarters).
