= Nurullo Aliev =

Tajik mixed martial artist (born 2000)

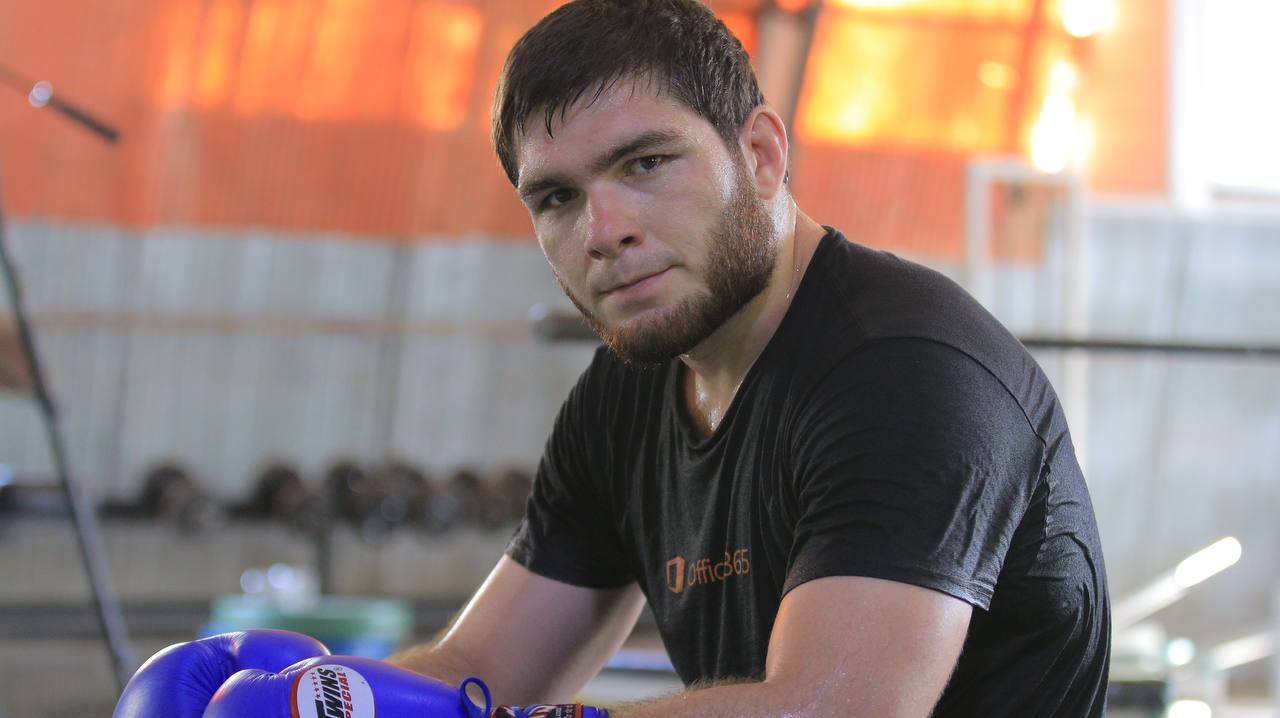
- Born: December 8, 2000 (age 25); Dushanbe, Tajikistan
- Other names: Tajik Eagle
- Height: 5 ft 10 in (1.78 m)
- Weight: 155 lb (70 kg; 11 st 1 lb)
- Division: Lightweight; Welterweight
- Reach: 72 in (183 cm)
- Fighting out of: Dushanbe, Tajikistan
- Team: Kaizen MMA; Kill Cliff FC
- Years active: 2018–present

Mixed martial arts record
- Total: 13
- Wins: 12
- By knockout: 2
- By decision: 10
- Losses: 1
- By decision: 1

Other information
- Mixed martial arts record from Sherdog

Nurullo Aliev (Russian: Нуруло Алиев; born December 8, 2000) is a Tajik mixed martial artist. He currently competes in the Lightweight division of the Ultimate Fighting Championship (UFC).

== Background ==
Aliev was born in Dushanbe, Tajikistan, with the fourth of six siblings. As a child, his energetic nature caused him trouble, as he was constantly getting into fights at school. At the age of 12, he started taking wrestling with his brothers.

== Mixed martial arts career ==
=== Early career ===
Aliev started his professional career during 2018–2021, at a Russian regional circuit, where he acquired a 7–0 record before his fight at Dana White's Contender Series.

=== Dana White's Contender Series ===
Aliev was invited to the Dana White's Contender Series, he faced Josh Wick at week 9 of DWCS season 6 on September 20, 2022. He won the fight via technical knockout in round one and he was awarded a UFC contract. Aliev became the first Tajikistani fighter to compete in the UFC.

=== Ultimate Fighting Championship ===
In his UFC debut, Aliev faced Rafael Alves on February 25, 2023, at UFC Fight Night 220. Despite being deducted one point due to a bite, but Aliev won the fight via majority decision.

Aliev was scheduled to face Mateusz Rębecki on November 11, 2023, at UFC 295. However, Aliev withdrew from the event in early November due to injury and was replaced by returning veteran Roosevelt Roberts.

Aliev was scheduled to face Yanal Ashmouz on January 11, 2025, at UFC Fight Night 249. However, Ashmouz withdrew for unknown reasons and was replaced by Joe Solecki. He won the fight via unanimous decision.

Aliev faced Shaqueme Rock on November 22, 2025, at UFC Fight Night 265. He won the fight via unanimous decision.

Aliev faced Mike Davis on July 25, 2026, at UFC Fight Night 282. He won the fight via unanimous decision.

Aliev faced Grant Dawson on October 24, 2026 at UFC 333. After Aliev was deducted one point due to illegal blows to the back of the head, Dawson won the fight by unanimous decision.

== Mixed martial arts record ==
Professional record breakdown
13 matches	12 wins	1 loss
By knockout	2	0
By decision	10	1

Res.	Record	Opponent	Method	Event	Date	Round	Time	Location	Notes
Loss	12–1	Grant Dawson	Decision (unanimous)	UFC 333	October 24, 2026	3	5:00	Abu Dhabi, United Arab Emirates	Aliev was deducted one point in round 1 due to illegal strikes to the back of the head.
Win	12–0	Mike Davis	Decision (unanimous)	UFC Fight Night: Ankalaev vs. Guskov	July 25, 2026	3	5:00	Abu Dhabi, United Arab Emirates	
Win	11–0	Shaqueme Rock	Decision (unanimous)	UFC Fight Night: Tsarukyan vs. Hooker	November 22, 2025	3	5:00	Al Rayyan, Qatar	
Win	10–0	Joe Solecki	Decision (unanimous)	UFC Fight Night: Dern vs. Ribas 2	January 11, 2025	3	5:00	Las Vegas, Nevada, United States	
Win	9–0	Rafael Alves	Decision (majority)	UFC Fight Night: Muniz vs. Allen	February 25, 2023	3	5:00	Las Vegas, Nevada, United States	Aliev was deducted one point in round 1 due to a bite.
Win	8–0	Josh Wick	TKO (punches)	Dana White's Contender Series 55	September 20, 2022	1	4:36	Las Vegas, Nevada, United States	Return to Lightweight.
Win	7–0	Kirill Kryukov	Decision (unanimous)	AMC Fight Nights: Abdulmanap Nurmagomedov Memory Tournament	September 17, 2021	3	5:00	Moscow, Russia	
Win	6–0	Alexander Grebnev	Decision (unanimous)	AMC Fight Nights Global: Winter Cup	December 24, 2020	1	3:07	Moscow, Russia	
Win	5–0	Ramazan Amirov	Decision (unanimous)	Gorilla Fighting 16	August 30, 2018	3	5:00	Astrakhan, Russia	Welterweight debut.
Win	4–0	Makkasharip Zaynukov	Decision (majority)	Samara MMA Federation: Battle on the Volga 6	September 23, 2028	3	5:00	Samara, Russia	
Win	3–0	Giovanny Giraldo	TKO (corner stoppage)	Samara MMA Federation: Battle on the Volga 4	May 11, 2018	2	5:00	Samara, Russia	
Win	2–0	Sergey Malikov	Decision (unanimous)	Samara MMA Federation: Battle on the Volga 3	March 4, 2018	3	5:00	Tolyatti, Russia	
Win	1–0	Khabib Khabibuloev	Decision (unanimous)	Mixed Martial Arts Federation of the Republic of Tajikistan: Ismoili Somoni FC	February 3, 2018	2	5:00	Dushanbe, Tajikistan	Lightweight debut.

== See also ==
- List of current UFC fighters
- List of male mixed martial artists
