= Damir Ismagulov =

Russia-Kazakh mixed martial arts fighter (born 1991)

- Born: Damir Amangeldyevich Ismagulov; February 3, 1991 (age 35); Udarnyy, Russian SFSR, Soviet Union
- Native name: Дамир Исмагулов
- Nationality: Russian; Kazakh
- Height: 5 ft 10 in (178 cm)
- Weight: 155 lb (70 kg; 11 st 1 lb)
- Division: Lightweight
- Reach: 70 in (178 cm)
- Fighting out of: Atyrau, Kazakhstan
- Team: Tiger Muay Thai/ Fighter Gym/ New Stream / Storm Fight Team / Boets MMA
- Trainer: Igor Funtikov
- Rank: Master of Sports in Army Hand-to-Hand Combat
- Years active: 2014–present

Professional boxing record
- Total: 1
- Wins: 1

Kickboxing record
- Losses
- By knockout: 1

Mixed martial arts record
- Total: 30
- Wins: 27
- By knockout: 14
- By submission: 1
- By decision: 12
- Losses: 3
- By decision: 3

Other information
- Boxing record from BoxRec
- Mixed martial arts record from Sherdog

Damir Amangeldyevich Ismagulov (Kazakh: Дамир Амангельдыұлы Исмагулов; born February 3, 1991) is a Russian and Kazakh mixed martial artist, who competes in the Lightweight division. He has previously competed for the Ultimate Fighting Championship and was the former M-1 Global lightweight champion.

== Background ==
As a child, he played football, was fond of horseback riding, tried himself in track and field athletics. Subsequently, he moved to Orenburg for permanent residence, enrolling in the Institute of Physical Culture and Sports of the Orenburg State Pedagogical University. As a student, he was engaged in various types of martial arts, fulfilled the standards of a master of sports in universal combat and in army hand-to-hand combat. Since 2011, he practised MMA at the amateur level. In 2014, after winning the Russian Cup, he was awarded the title of Master of Sports in mixed martial arts. Ismagulov is a practising Muslim and is ethnic Kazakh.

== Mixed martial arts career ==
=== M-1 Global ===
Ismagulov was M-1 Global lightweight champion after beating Maxim Divnich in the title bout. After defending the M-1 Lightweight Championship twice, defeating such fighters as Raul Tutarauli and Artem Damkovsky, he signed a contract with the UFC.

=== Ultimate Fighting Championship ===
Ismagulov made promotional debut on December 2, 2018, at UFC Fight Night: dos Santos vs. Tuivasa against Alex Gorgees. He won the fight via unanimous decision.

Ismagulov faced Joel Álvarez on February 23, 2019, at UFC Fight Night: Błachowicz vs. Santos. He won the fight via unanimous decision.

Ismagulov faced Thiago Moisés on August 31, 2019, at UFC Fight Night 157. He won the fight via unanimous decision.

Ismagulov faced Rafael Alves on May 22, 2021, at UFC Fight Night: Font vs. Garbrandt. He won the fight via unanimous decision.

Ismagulov was expected to face Magomed Mustafaev on October 30, 2021, at UFC 267. However at the weigh-ins, Ismagulov came in at 163.5 pounds, missing weight by 7.5 pounds, the bout was subsequently cancelled by the UFC.

Ismagulov faced Guram Kutateladze on June 18, 2022, at UFC on ESPN 37. He won the close bout via split decision.

Ismagulov faced Arman Tsarukyan on December 17, 2022, at UFC Fight Night 216. He lost the fight via unanimous decision.

On January 1, 2023, Ismagulov announced his retirement on Instagram, citing 'circumstances and health problems'. On January 29, Damir revealed that according to his contract with the UFC, he had one more fight left, so he decided to fight as agreed.

Ismagulov faced Grant Dawson on July 1, 2023, at UFC on ESPN 48. He lost the fight by unanimous decision.

On July 20, 2023, it was announced that Ismagulov had completed his contract and was not renewed.

=== Post UFC ===
Ismagulov was scheduled to face Adriano Martins on September 21, 2024 at "Alash Pride FC 100". However, Martins pulled out for unknown reasons and was replaced by Oberdan Tenório on short notice. Ismagulov won the fight via a spinning kick knockout in the first round.

== Championships and accomplishments ==
=== Mixed martial arts ===
- M-1 Global
  - M-1 Global Lightweight Championship (Three times)
  - 2017 M-1 Global Fighter of the Year

== Mixed martial arts record ==
Professional record breakdown
30 matches	27 wins	3 losses
By knockout	14	0
By submission	1	0
By decision	12	3

Res.	Record	Opponent	Method	Event	Date	Round	Time	Location	Notes
Win	27–3	Alan Patrick	TKO (punches)	Alash Pride 108	May 27, 2025	2	4:33	Astana, Kazakhstan	
Win	26–3	Oberdan Tenório	KO (spinning back kick)	Alash Pride 100	September 21, 2024	1	2:12	Aktobe, Kazakhstan	
Win	25–3	Dimitry Klimov	Decision (unanimous)	Hardcore MMA 93	July 13, 2024	3	5:00	Almaty, Kazakhstan	
Loss	24–3	Grant Dawson	Decision (unanimous)	UFC on ESPN: Strickland vs. Magomedov	July 1, 2023	3	5:00	Las Vegas, Nevada, United States	
Loss	24–2	Arman Tsarukyan	Decision (unanimous)	UFC Fight Night: Cannonier vs. Strickland	December 17, 2022	3	5:00	Las Vegas, Nevada, United States	
Win	24–1	Guram Kutateladze	Decision (split)	UFC on ESPN: Kattar vs. Emmett	June 18, 2022	3	5:00	Austin, Texas, United States	Originally announced as a majority decision due to a miscalculation in scores.
Win	23–1	Rafael Alves	Decision (unanimous)	UFC Fight Night: Font vs. Garbrandt	May 22, 2021	3	5:00	Las Vegas, Nevada, United States	
Win	22–1	Thiago Moisés	Decision (unanimous)	UFC Fight Night: Andrade vs. Zhang	August 31, 2019	3	5:00	Shenzhen, China	
Win	21–1	Joel Álvarez	Decision (unanimous)	UFC Fight Night: Błachowicz vs. Santos	February 23, 2019	3	5:00	Prague, Czech Republic	
Win	20–1	Alex Gorgees	Decision (unanimous)	UFC Fight Night: dos Santos vs. Tuivasa	December 2, 2018	3	5:00	Adelaide, Australia	
Win	19–1	Artem Damkovsky	TKO (hand injury)	M-1 Challenge 94	June 15, 2018	1	3:53	Orenburg, Russia	Defended the M-1 Global Lightweight Championship.
Win	18–1	Raul Tutarauli	Decision (unanimous)	M-1 Challenge 88	February 22, 2018	5	5:00	Moscow, Russia	Defended the M-1 Global Lightweight Championship.
Win	17–1	Rogério Matias da Conceição	Decision (unanimous)	M-1 Challenge 85	November 10, 2017	3	5:00	Moscow, Russia	Non-title bout.
Win	16–1	Maxim Divnich	TKO (punches)	M-1 Challenge 78	May 26, 2017	5	4:47	Orenburg, Russia	Won the vacant M-1 Global Lightweight Championship.
Win	15–1	Morgan Heraud	TKO (punches)	M-1 Challenge 74	February 18, 2017	3	1:31	Saint Petersburg, Russia	Catchweight (159 lb) bout.
Win	14–1	Murat Bakhtorazov	TKO (punches)	Alash Pride FC: Zhekpe Zhek	December 15, 2016	1	3:52	Almaty, Kazakhstan	Won the Alash Pride FC Lightweight Tournament.
Win	13–1	Aibek Nurseit	TKO (punches)	Alash Pride FC: Zhekpe Zhek	December 15, 2016	1	4:03	Almaty, Kazakhstan	Alash Pride FC Lightweight Tournament Semifinal.
Win	12–1	Temirlan Aysadilov	TKO (punches)	Alash Pride FC: Zhekpe Zhek	December 15, 2016	2	2:49	Almaty, Kazakhstan	Alash Pride FC Lightweight Tournament Quarterfinal.
Win	11–1	Rubenilton Pereira	Decision (unanimous)	M-1 Challenge 72	November 18, 2016	3	5:00	Moscow, Russia	Catchweight (161 lb) bout. Fight of the Night.
Win	10–1	Ilias Chyngyzbek	Decision (unanimous)	Naiza FC 6	September 16, 2016	5	5:00	Aktau, Kazakhstan	Catchweight (161 lb) bout.
Win	9–1	Raul Tutarauli	TKO (punches)	M-1 Challenge 66	May 27, 2016	3	3:49	Orenburg, Russia	Fight of the Night.
Win	8–1	Vyacheslav Ten	Submission (rear-naked choke)	M-1 Challenge 65	April 8, 2016	1	2:31	Saint Petersburg, Russia	
Win	7–1	Gennady Sysoev	TKO (submission to punches)	Scythian Gold: MMA Fight Night	March 4, 2016	3	N/A	Orenburg, Russia	
Win	6–1	Javier Fuentes	TKO (punches)	Orenburg MMA Federation: Scythian Gold 2015	November 21, 2015	1	N/A	Orenburg, Russia	
Loss	5–1	Ramazan Esenbaev	Decision (unanimous)	M-1 Challenge 61	September 20, 2015	3	5:00	Nazran, Russia	
Win	5–0	Pedro Eugenio Granjo	TKO (punches)	M-1 Challenge 59	July 3, 2015	1	2:53	Astana, Kazakhstan	Cachtweight (156.5 lb) bout; Ismagulov missed weight.
Win	4–0	Sergei Andreev	Decision (unanimous)	M-1 Challenge 57	May 2, 2015	3	5:00	Orenburg, Russia	
Win	3–0	Faud Aliev	Decision (unanimous)	Kazakhstan MMA Federation: Battle of Nomads 3	April 11, 2015	3	5:00	Oral, Kazakhstan	
Win	2–0	Eldar Magomedov	TKO (punches)	Kazakhstan MMA Federation: Battle of Nomads 2	November 30, 2014	1	4:32	Almaty, Kazakhstan	
Win	1–0	David Bácskai	TKO (punches)	Orenburg MMA Federation: Scythian Gold 2014	October 18, 2014	1	3:57	Orenburg, Russia	Lightweight debut.

== Kickboxing record ==
Professional Kickboxing record
Date	Result	Opponent	Event	Location	Method	Round	Time
2024-03-06	Loss	(Russia) Eduard Vartanyan	Nashe Delo 82	Saint Petersburg, Russia	Decision (Unanimous)	3	3:00
Legend: Win Loss Draw/No contest Notes

== Professional boxing record ==
1 fight	1 win	0 losses
By knockout	1	0

No.	Result	Record	Opponent	Type	Round, time	Date	Location	Notes
1	Win	1–0	Felipe da Silva Maia	UD	4	Dec 20, 2024	Zhaksylyk Ushkempirov Martial Arts Palace, Astana, Kazakhstan	

== See also ==
- List of male mixed martial artists
