= Joe Solecki =

American mixed martial arts fighter

- Born: August 27, 1993 (age 33); Wenonah, New Jersey, United States
- Height: 5 ft 9 in (1.75 m)
- Weight: 155 lb (70 kg; 11 st 1 lb)
- Division: Lightweight
- Reach: 70 in (178 cm)
- Fighting out of: Wilmington, North Carolina, United States
- Team: Team Balance; Gym-O (2017–present)
- Rank: Black belt in Brazilian jiu-jitsu under John Hassett
- Years active: 2016–2025

Mixed martial arts record
- Total: 19
- Wins: 13
- By submission: 9
- By decision: 4
- Losses: 6
- By knockout: 2
- By decision: 4

Other information
- Website: joesolecki.com
- Mixed martial arts record from Sherdog

Joe Solecki (born August 27, 1993) is an American retired professional mixed martial artist. A professional from 2016 to 2025, Solecki was most notable for his time in the Lightweight division for the Ultimate Fighting Championship (UFC).

== Background ==
Solecki began training Brazilian Jiu-Jitsu at the age of 6. Joe states:

I got into BJJ at age 6 by accident, I wanted to do karate like the power rangers. My parents sent my brother for a year or two at first, but we ended up enrolling in a school where the instructor had begun training BJJ and he switched the entire curriculum to grappling by the time I signed up.

== Mixed martial arts career ==
=== Early career ===
Solecki started his professional as a pretty accomplished amateur with a 5–0 record. With all of those 5 amateur wins coming via submission or TKO. In his MMA debut at CFFC 61, he submitted Chris Rollins via rear-naked choke in the first round. Solecki also tapped out Andrew Cherico at CFFC 62 and Kevin Perez at CFFC 63, respectively. Although Joe was on an 8 fight win streak, that came to an end when he faced Cesar Balmaceda. That fight went Cesar's way via unanimous decision. He defeated Eric Calderon via TKO in round one at Warfare MMA 16. Then at CFFC 69, Solecki submitted Johnson Jajoute in the first round via rear-naked choke. He then came up against Nikolas Motta and unfortunately Solecki lost this fight via a finish. He tapped out Gilbert Patrocinio via triangle choke in round one at ROC 66. At CFFC 73, Solecki defeated Jacob Bohn via unanimous decision. In the main event of Dana White's Contender Series 19 on July 9, 2019, Solecki submitted James Wallace in the first round to pick up his sixth submission win as a professional along with a UFC contract.

=== Ultimate Fighting Championship ===
Solecki made his UFC debut against veteran Matt Wiman on December 7, 2019, at UFC on ESPN: Overeem vs. Rozenstruik. He won the fight via unanimous decision.

Solecki was expected to face Austin Hubbard on June 20, 2020, at UFC on ESPN: Blaydes vs. Volkov. However, at the last minute, Solecki was replaced by promotional newcomer Max Rohskopf.

The bout with Hubbard was rescheduled on August 22, 2020, at UFC on ESPN: Munhoz vs. Edgar. Solecki won the fight by submission in the first round.

Solecki faced Jim Miller on April 10, 2021, at UFC on ABC: Vettori vs. Holland. He won the bout via unanimous decision.

Solecki faced Jared Gordon on October 2, 2021, at UFC Fight Night 193. He lost the fight via split decision.

Solecki faced Alex da Silva Coelho on June 4, 2022, at UFC Fight Night 207. He won the bout via majority decision after a point deduction was given to da Silva due to repeatedly locking his toes in the fence.

Solecki was scheduled to face Benoît Saint-Denis on February 18, 2023, at UFC Fight Night 219. However, Saint-Denis withdrew from the bout citing ankle injury. He was replaced by promotional newcomer Carl Deaton III and the bout was moved to UFC Fight Night 220 a week later. Solecki won the fight via technical submission in round two. This win earned him the Performance of the Night bonus.

Solecki faced Drakkar Klose on December 2, 2023 at UFC on ESPN 52. He lost the fight via knockout in round one.

Solecki faced Grant Dawson on June 1, 2024, at UFC 302. He lost the fight by unanimous decision.

Solecki faced Nurullo Aliev, replacing Yanal Ashmouz, on January 11, 2025, at UFC Fight Night 249. He lost the fight by unanimous decision.

On February 17, 2025, Solecki announced his retirement from competition.

== Professional grappling career ==
Solecki represented Alliance Fighting Championship at UFC Fight Pass Invitational 2 on July 3, 2022. He lost his only match against Dan Manasoiu and the team were knocked out in the opening round.

Solecki submitted Michael Porter with a guillotine choke at Fight 2 Win 248 on March 8, 2024.

Solecki competed against Peter Fazekas at Fury Pro Grappling 11 on November 2, 2024. He won the match by submission.

== Championships and accomplishments ==
- Ultimate Fighting Championship
  - Performance of the Night (One time) vs. Carl Deaton III

== Personal life ==
Solecki and his wife Kacey, have a daughter, born 2020.

== Mixed martial arts record ==
Professional record breakdown
19 matches	13 wins	6 losses
By knockout	0	2
By submission	9	0
By decision	4	4

Res.	Record	Opponent	Method	Event	Date	Round	Time	Location	Notes
Loss	13–6	Nurullo Aliev	Decision (unanimous)	UFC Fight Night: Dern vs. Ribas 2	January 11, 2025	3	5:00	Las Vegas, Nevada, United States	
Loss	13–5	Grant Dawson	Decision (unanimous)	UFC 302	June 1, 2024	3	5:00	Newark, New Jersey, United States	
Loss	13–4	Drakkar Klose	KO (slam)	UFC on ESPN: Dariush vs. Tsarukyan	December 2, 2023	1	1:41	Austin, Texas, United States	
Win	13–3	Carl Deaton III	Technical Submission (rear-naked choke)	UFC Fight Night: Muniz vs. Allen	February 25, 2023	2	4:55	Las Vegas, Nevada, United States	Performance of the Night.
Win	12–3	Alex da Silva Coelho	Decision (majority)	UFC Fight Night: Volkov vs. Rozenstruik	June 4, 2022	3	5:00	Las Vegas, Nevada, United States	Coelho was deducted one point in round 2 for repeatedly locking his toes in the fence.
Loss	11–3	Jared Gordon	Decision (split)	UFC Fight Night: Santos vs. Walker	October 2, 2021	3	5:00	Las Vegas, Nevada, United States	
Win	11–2	Jim Miller	Decision (unanimous)	UFC on ABC: Vettori vs. Holland	April 10, 2021	3	5:00	Las Vegas, Nevada, United States	
Win	10–2	Austin Hubbard	Submission (rear-naked choke)	UFC on ESPN: Munhoz vs. Edgar	August 22, 2020	1	3:51	Las Vegas, Nevada, United States	
Win	9–2	Matt Wiman	Decision (unanimous)	UFC on ESPN: Overeem vs. Rozenstruik	December 7, 2019	3	5:00	Washington, D.C., United States	
Win	8–2	James Wallace	Technical Submission (guillotine choke)	Dana White's Contender Series 19	July 9, 2019	1	3:49	Las Vegas, Nevada, United States	
Win	7–2	Jacob Bohn	Decision (unanimous)	Cage Fury FC 73	March 2, 2019	3	5:00	Philadelphia, Pennsylvania, United States	
Win	6–2	Gilbert Patrocinio	Submission (triangle choke)	Ring of Combat 66	November 16, 2018	1	2:37	Atlantic City, New Jersey, United States	
Loss	5–2	Nikolas Motta	KO (punches)	864 Fighting Championship 5	July 21, 2018	3	1:08	Greenville, South Carolina, United States	Catchweight (159 lb) bout.
Win	5–1	Johnson Jajoute	Submission (rear-naked choke)	Cage Fury FC 69	December 16, 2017	1	3:23	Atlantic City, New Jersey, United States	
Win	4–1	Eric Calderon	Submission (rear-naked choke)	Warfare MMA 16	August 19, 2017	1	1:14	North Myrtle Beach, South Carolina, United States	
Loss	3–1	Cesar Balmaceda	Decision (unanimous)	Cage Fury FC 65	May 20, 2017	3	5:00	Philadelphia, Pennsylvania, United States	
Win	3–0	Kevin Perez	Submission (rear-naked choke)	Cage Fury FC 63	February 18, 2017	1	1:08	Atlantic City, New Jersey, United States	
Win	2–0	Andrew Chirico	Submission (rear-naked choke)	Cage Fury FC 62	December 17, 2016	1	2:07	Philadelphia, Pennsylvania, United States	
Win	1–0	Chris Rollins	Submission (rear-naked choke)	Cage Fury FC 61	October 29, 2016	1	2:48	Atlantic City, New Jersey, United States	Lightweight debut.

== See also ==
- List of male mixed martial artists
