= UFC Fight Night: Andrade vs. Blanchfield =

Mixed martial arts event in 2023

- The poster for UFC Fight Night: Andrade vs. Blanchfield
- Promotion: Ultimate Fighting Championship
- Date: February 18, 2023
- Venue: UFC Apex
- City: Enterprise, Nevada, United States
- Attendance: Not announced

Event chronology
UFC 284: Makhachev vs. Volkanovski	UFC Fight Night: Andrade vs. Blanchfield	UFC Fight Night: Muniz vs. Allen

UFC Fight Night: Andrade vs. Blanchfield (also known as UFC Fight Night 219, UFC on ESPN+ 77, and UFC Vegas 69) was a mixed martial arts event produced by the Ultimate Fighting Championship that took place on February 18, 2023, at the UFC Apex facility in Enterprise, Nevada, part of the Las Vegas Metropolitan Area, United States.

== Background ==
A bantamweight bout between Marlon Vera and former interim UFC Bantamweight Championship challenger Cory Sandhagen was expected to headline the event. However, the bout was moved to UFC on ESPN: Vera vs. Sandhagen for unknown reasons. As a result, a women's flyweight bout between former UFC Women's Flyweight Championship challenger Taila Santos and Erin Blanchfield was promoted to main event status. However, just one week out from the event, Santos withdrew after her cornermen were denied visas into the United States, and was replaced by former UFC Women's Strawweight Champion Jéssica Andrade.

A middleweight bout between Gerald Meerschaert and Abusupiyan Magomedov was expected to take place at the event. They were previously scheduled to meet at UFC Fight Night: Lewis vs. Daukaus but Magomedov was forced to pull from the event due to visa issue. In turn, Magomedov once again pulled out due to visa issues and the bout was scrapped.

A light heavyweight bout between William Knight and Marcin Prachnio took place at the event. They were previously scheduled to meet at UFC Fight Night: Nzechukwu vs. Cuțelaba but the bout was scrapped for undisclosed reasons.

A light heavyweight bout between former interim UFC Light Heavyweight Championship challenger Ovince Saint Preux and 2018 PFL heavyweight tournament winner Philipe Lins took place at the event. They were previously scheduled to meet at UFC 282 but Lins withdrew from the bout due to an undisclosed reason.

A welterweight bout between Billy Goff and Themba Gorimbo was expected to take place at the event. However, Goff withdrawal due to undisclosed reason and was replaced by A.J. Fletcher.

A welterweight bout between Ramiz Brahimaj and Carlston Harris was scheduled for the event. However, Brahimaj was pulled from the event citing neck injury. The UFC then opted to booked Harris against Abubakar Nurmagomedov at UFC Fight Night: Yan vs. Dvalishvili on March 11.

A lightweight bout between Joe Solecki and Benoît Saint-Denis was scheduled for the event. However, Saint-Denis withdrew from the bout citing ankle injury. He was replaced by promotional newcomer Carl Deaton III and the bout was moved to UFC Fight Night: Krylov vs. Spann a week later.

A lightweight bout between Jim Miller and Gabriel Benítez was expected to take place at the event. However, Benítez withdrew due to an undisclosed reason and was replaced by Alexander Hernandez.

== Results ==
Main card (ESPN+)
Weight class				Method	Round	Time	Notes
Women's Flyweight	Erin Blanchfield	def.	Jéssica Andrade	Submission (rear-naked choke)	2	1:37
Light Heavyweight	Zac Pauga	def.	Jordan Wright	Decision (unanimous) (30–27, 30–27, 29–28)	3	5:00
Heavyweight	Jamal Pogues	def.	Josh Parisian	Decision (unanimous) (30–27, 30–27, 29–28)	3	5:00
Light Heavyweight	Marcin Prachnio	def.	William Knight	Decision (unanimous) (30–27, 30–27, 30–27)	3	5:00
Lightweight	Alexander Hernandez	def.	Jim Miller	Decision (unanimous) (30–27, 30–27, 29–28)	3	5:00
Preliminary card (ESPN+)
Lightweight	Nazim Sadykhov	def.	Evan Elder	TKO (doctor stoppage)	3	0:38
Women's Bantamweight	Mayra Bueno Silva	def.	Lina Länsberg	Submission (kneebar)	2	4:45
Featherweight	Jamall Emmers	def.	Khusein Askhabov	Decision (unanimous) (30–27, 30–27, 30–27)	3	5:00
Light Heavyweight	Philipe Lins	def.	Ovince Saint Preux	KO (punches)	1	0:49
Welterweight	A.J. Fletcher	def.	Themba Gorimbo	Submission (guillotine choke)	2	1:37
Flyweight	Clayton Carpenter	def.	Juancamilo Ronderos	Submission (rear-naked choke)	1	3:13

== Bonus awards ==
The following fighters received $50,000 bonuses.

- Fight of the Night: Nazim Sadykhov vs. Evan Elder
- Performance of the Night: Erin Blanchfield and Mayra Bueno Silva

== See also ==
- List of UFC events
- List of current UFC fighters
- 2023 in UFC
