= UFC Fight Night: Muniz vs. Allen =

UFC mixed martial arts event in 2023

- The poster for UFC Fight Night: Muniz vs. Allen
- Promotion: Ultimate Fighting Championship
- Date: February 25, 2023
- Venue: UFC Apex
- City: Enterprise, Nevada, United States
- Attendance: Not announced

Event chronology
UFC Fight Night: Andrade vs. Blanchfield	UFC Fight Night: Muniz vs. Allen	UFC 285: Jones vs. Gane

UFC Fight Night: Muniz vs. Allen (also known as UFC Fight Night 220, UFC on ESPN+ 78 and UFC Vegas 70) was a mixed martial arts event produced by the Ultimate Fighting Championship that took place on February 25, 2023, at the UFC Apex facility in Enterprise, Nevada, part of the Las Vegas Metropolitan Area, United States.

== Background ==
A light heavyweight bout between Nikita Krylov and former LFA Light Heavyweight Champion Ryan Spann was expected to headline the event. However, the headliner was cancelled during the broadcast as Krylov fell ill. As a result, the middleweight bout between André Muniz and former LFA Middleweight Champion Brendan Allen was elevated to the new main event. Krylov and Spann were eventually rescheduled to meet at UFC Fight Night: Yan vs. Dvalishvili two weeks later.

A lightweight bout between Jordan Leavitt and Victor Martinez took place the event. They were previously scheduled to meet at UFC on ESPN: Luque vs. Muhammad 2 but Martinez withdrew from the event due to undisclosed reasons.

A women's flyweight bout between Cortney Casey and Jasmine Jasudavicius was expected to take place at the event. However, Casey withdrew from the event due to an undisclosed medical reason and was replaced by former interim LFA Women's Flyweight Champion Gabriella Fernandes.

A featherweight bout between Andre Fili and Lucas Almeida was expected to take place at the event. However, Fili was forced to withdraw from the bout due to emergency eye surgery and the bout was canceled.

A flyweight bout between Ode' Osbourne and Denys Bondar was scheduled for the event. However, Bondar withdrew from the event for undisclosed reasons and he was replaced by Charles Johnson at a catchweight of 130 pounds.

Erick Gonzalez was scheduled to face Darrius Flowers and Trevor Peek was expected to meet Alex Reyes in lightweight bouts respectively for the event. However, for unknown reasons, both Flower and Reyes were pulled from the event and Peek was scheduled to face Gonzalez instead.

Garrett Armfield and José Johnson were expected to meet in a bantamweight bout at the preliminary card. However, the pairing was scrapped after Johnson was pulled due to a medical issue.

A women's bantamweight bout between Hailey Cowan and Ailin Perez was expected to take place at the event. However, the day before the event, Cowan withdrew due to illness and the bout was canceled.

== Results ==
Main card (ESPN+)
Weight class				Method	Round	Time	Notes
Middleweight	Brendan Allen	def.	André Muniz	Submission (rear-naked choke)	3	4:25
Heavyweight	Augusto Sakai	def.	Don'Tale Mayes	Decision (unanimous) (30–27, 30–27, 30–27)	3	5:00
Women's Flyweight	Tatiana Suarez	def.	Montana De La Rosa	Submission (guillotine choke)	2	2:51
Welterweight	Mike Malott	def.	Yohan Lainesse	Submission (arm-triangle choke)	1	4:15
Preliminary card (ESPN+)
Lightweight	Trevor Peek	def.	Erick Gonzalez	KO (punches)	1	4:59
Women's Flyweight	Jasmine Jasudavicius	def.	Gabriella Fernandes	Decision (unanimous) (30–26, 30–26, 30–26)	3	5:00
Lightweight	Jordan Leavitt	def.	Victor Martinez	TKO (knees and punches)	1	2:27
Catchweight (130 lb)	Ode' Osbourne	def.	Charles Johnson	Decision (split) (28-29, 29-28, 29-28)	3	5:00
Lightweight	Joe Solecki	def.	Carl Deaton III	Technical Submission (rear-naked choke)	2	4:55
Lightweight	Nurullo Aliev	def.	Rafael Alves	Decision (majority) (29–27, 29–27, 28–28)	3	5:00	(Note: Aliev was deducted 1 point in round 1 due to a bite.)

== Bonus awards ==
The following fighters received $50,000 bonuses.

- Fight of the Night: No bonus awarded.
- Performance of the Night: Brendan Allen, Tatiana Suarez, Mike Malott, Trevor Peek, Jordan Leavitt, and Joe Solecki

== See also ==
- List of UFC events
- List of current UFC fighters
- 2023 in UFC
