= Rondon do Pará =

Municipality in Pará, Brazil

Coordinates: 4.77583°S 48.0669°W

- Municipality
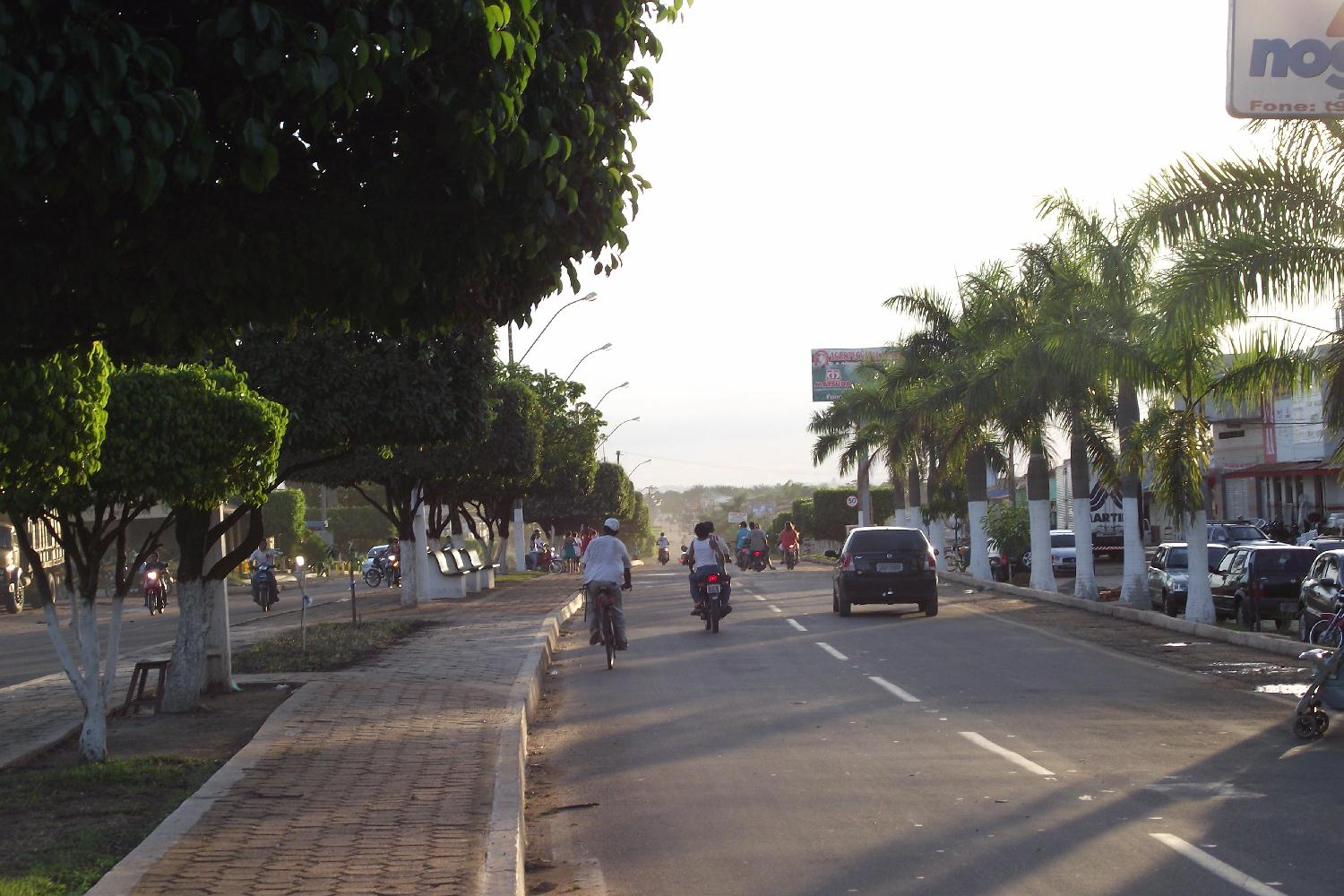

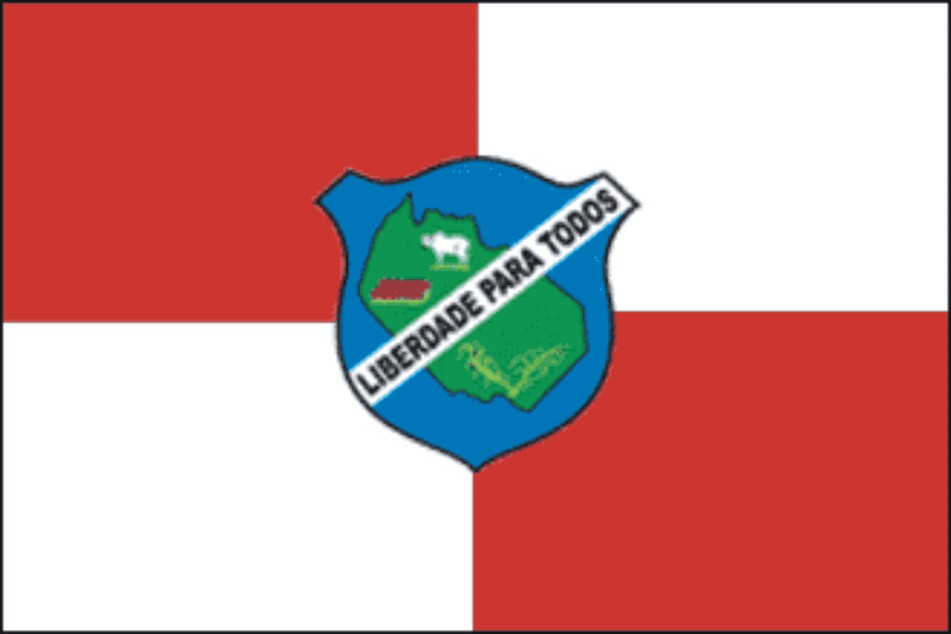
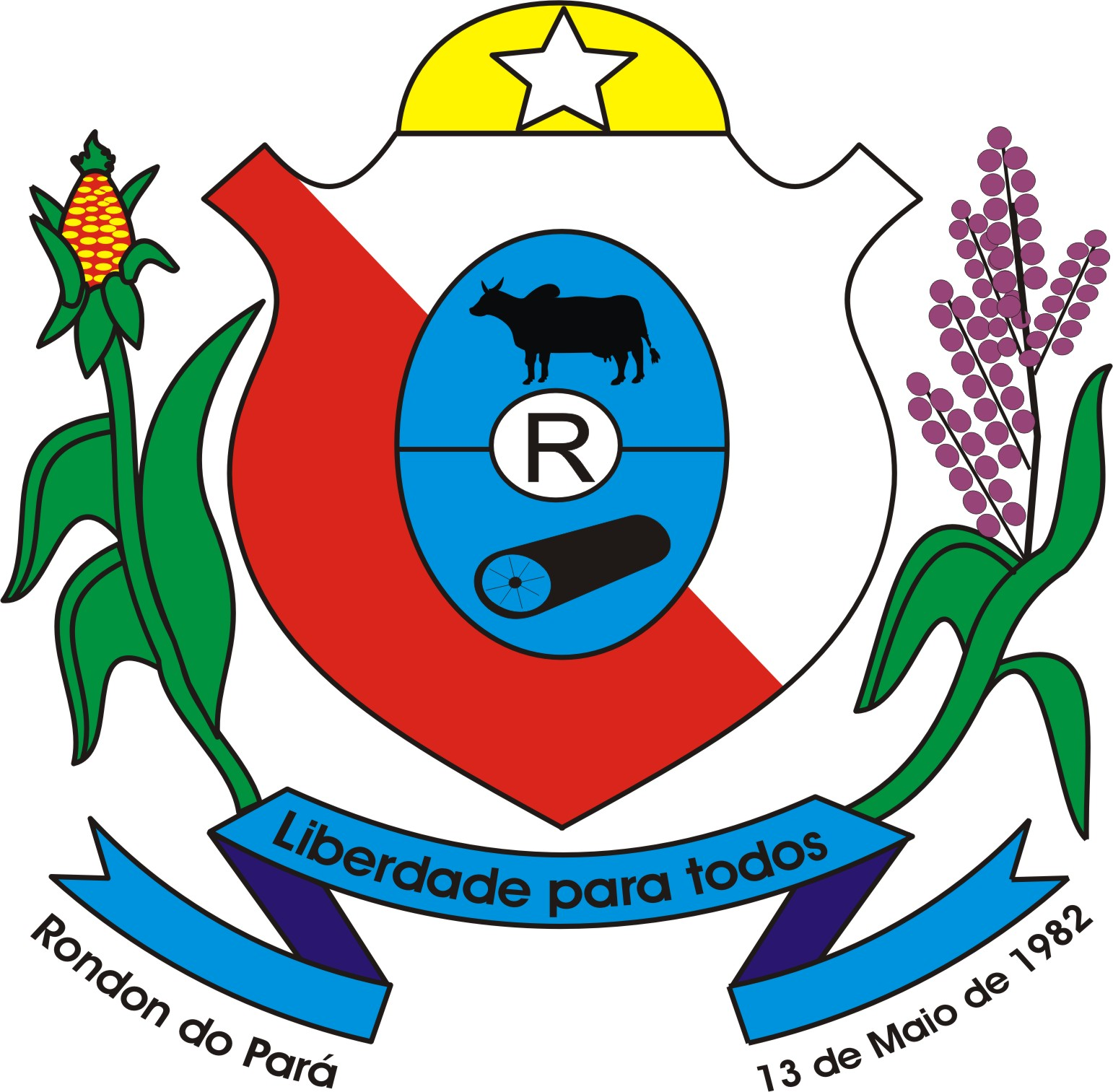
- Flag Coat of arms
- Motto: Liberdade para todos
- Interactive map of Rondon do Pará
- Country: Brazil
- Region: Northern
- State: Pará
- Mesoregion: Sudeste Paraense
- Distance to Capital: 523km
- Neighboring municipalities: Dom Eliseu, Goianésia do Pará, Jacundá, Nova Ipixuna, Marabá, Bom Jesus do Tocantins, Abel Figueiredo, Açailândia (MA), Cidelândia (MA) and Vila Nova dos Martírios (MA)
- Founded: February 9, 1969
- Incorporated as a municipality: May 13, 1982

Government
  - Mayor: Adriana Andrade de Oliveira (2025 - 2028) (MDB)

Area
  - Total: 3,183.951 sq mi (8,246.394 km^{2})
- Elevation: 640 ft (195 m)

Population (2020)
  - Total: 52,803
  - Rank: 3rd (Microregion of Paragominas)
- Demonym: rondonense
- Time zone: UTC−3 (BRT)

Rondon do Pará is a municipality in the state of Pará in the Northern region of Brazil. Located in the Microregion of Paragominas, its population in 2020 according to IBGE estimates is 52,357. Rondon do Pará is the third most populated municipality in the Microregion of Paragominas, only behind Dom Eliseu and Paragominas itself.

== History ==
=== Candangolândia de Arinos Brazil - Vila Rondon ===
The region where the municipality of Rondon of Pará is located today was originally populated by indigenous people.

The municipality of Rondon do Pará originated in late 1962, with the works of the demarcation of the first farms, with the actual settlement of the current territory only occurred in 1968 when the Departamento de Estradas e Rodagens began construction of the PA-070 (now BR-222) highway. In the 86th kilometer of the highway, a camp was built on which more people are settling gradually.

Eventually, the DER opens the new PA-70 highway. The locality within the 86th kilometer was known as Candangolândia de Arinos Brazil.

Candangolândia prospered after the Federal Government created the "Projeto Rondon" in 1969, with a gas station, pharmacy, and a butcher shop, it was renamed to Vila Rondon. It then became an administrative district of São Domingos do Capim by State Law No. 4,649, on July 9, 1976.

=== As a municipality ===
Vila Rondon became a municipality by State Law No. 5,027, on May 13, 1982. It broke away from São Domingos do Capim and Moju and went under a new name as Rondon do Pará.

== Geography ==
It is located at a latitude of 04°46'34" south and a longitude of 48°04'02" west, at an altitude of 195 meters.

Amidst areas of plains, the municipality of Rondon do Pará encompasses an area of irregular terrain, with mountainous regions and erosion.

=== Vegetation ===
Rondon do Pará is covered by areas of savannas, grasslands and secondary growth. Extensive logging of the Amazon rainforest made the areas of rainforest rare with grasslands and savannas becoming predominant.

=== Hydrography ===
Rondon do Pará's main river is the Araranguá River, originating from Maranhão, supplying the city with water and receiving tributaries from the region's main rivers until it joins the Surubiu River on the border of Goianésia do Pará which forms the Capim River.

Other rivers include the Ouro River, Santa Lúcia River, Pitinga River, and the Moju River. Other streams include Pebas Stream, Martírios Stream, Prata Stream, and the Marcelino Stream.

== Transportation ==
The municipality can be reached on land via the BR-222 highway. Others include the Surubijú road from Açailândia and Martírios road from Vila Nova dos Martírios, however these last two are not paved.

== See also ==
- List of municipalities in Pará
