= Tailândia =

- Municipality
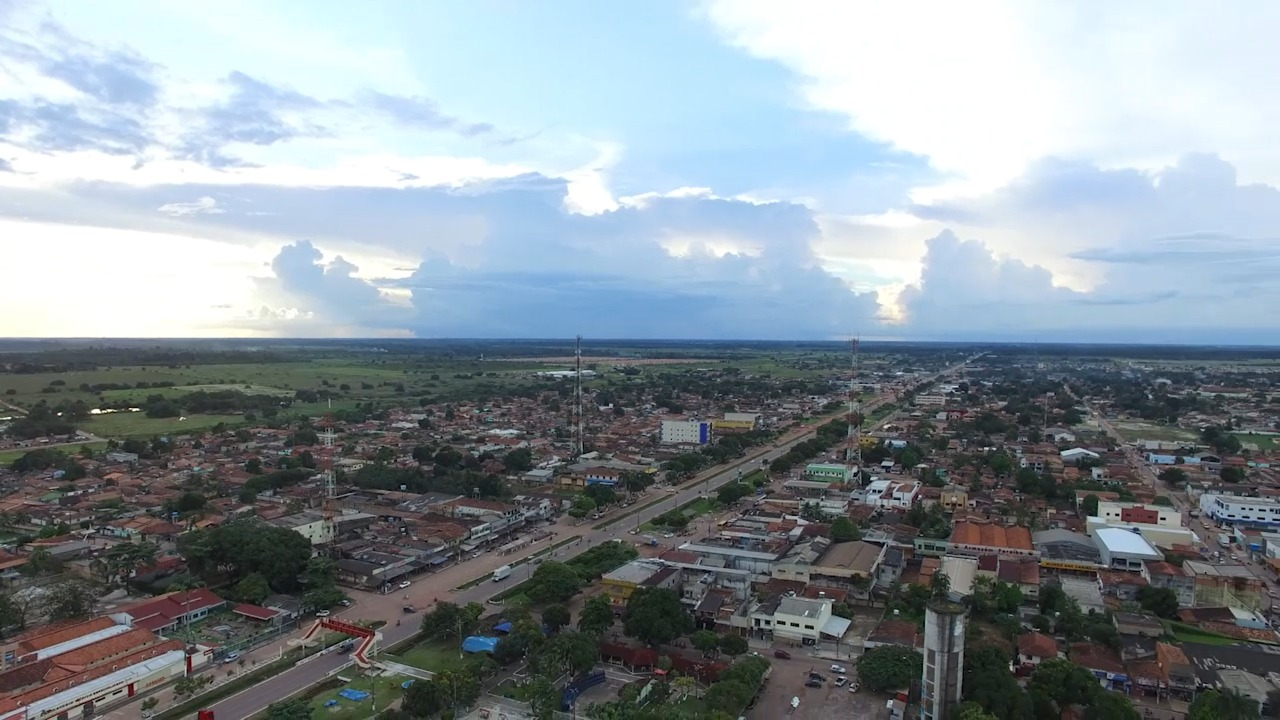

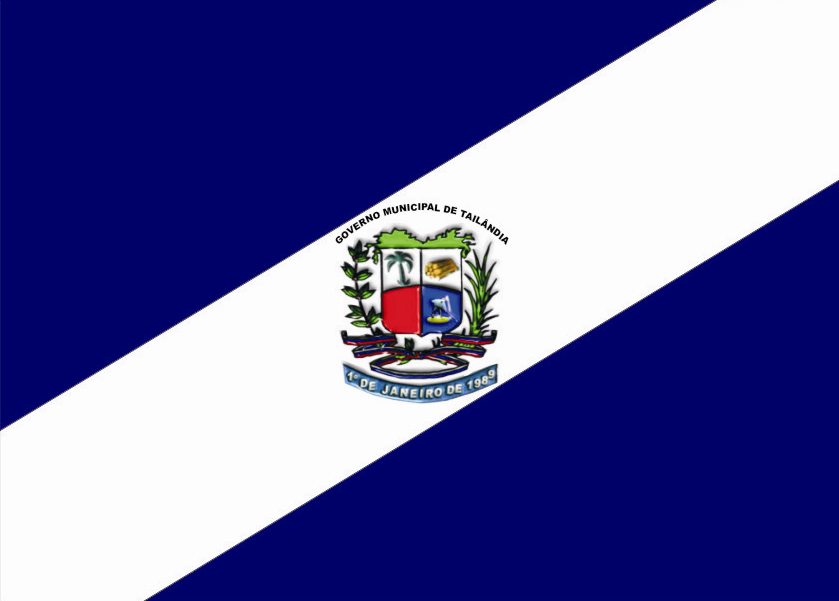
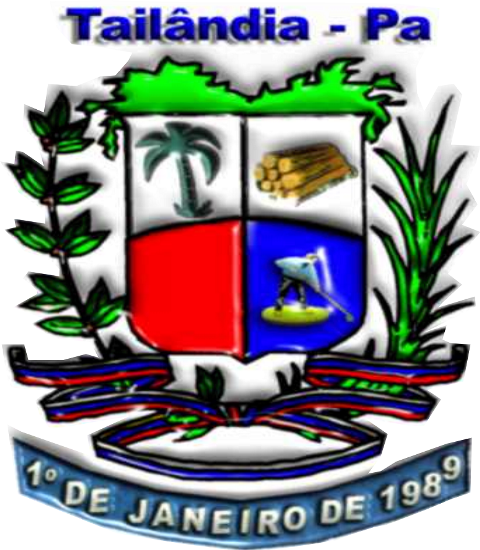
- Flag Coat of arms

- Location in Brazil
- Coordinates: 02°56′S 48°57′W
- Country: Brazil
- Region: Northern
- State: Pará
- Mesoregion: Nordeste Paraense
- Bordering municipalities: Acará, Breu Branco, Goianésia do Pará, Tomé-Açu and Moju
- Distance to Capital: 240km
- Founded: May 10, 1989
- Named for: Thailand

Population (2020)
  - Total: 108,969
- Time zone: UTC−3 (BRT)

Tailândia (Portuguese: [tajˈlɐ̃.d͡ʒi.ɐ], means Thailand in Portuguese) is a municipality in the state of Pará in the Northern region of Brazil.

== Geography ==
It is limited to the north with the municipality of Acará, to the east of Tomé-açu, to the south with Ipixuna and, to the west, with the municipality of Moju and has an area of km^{2}. According to the IBGE forecast for 2026, more than 112,100 inhabitants. He had his political emancipation on 10 May 1988.

Besides the seat of the municipality, Thailand has some towns and villages: the villages of Bom Jesus, Palmares, Nossa Senhora Aparecida, Aui-açú, Bethel, Bethany, Cristo Rei, Nossa Senhora de Nazaré, community Bom Remédio, Olho D'Água, Santana I and II, São Francisco, Nova Canaã, São João, São Pedro, among others.

== History ==
In February 2008, the city was the scene of a violent demonstration against security forces after the IBAMA shut down the activities of several illegal logging companies in the region, which was the largest source of income of the population at the time.

== See also ==
- List of municipalities in Pará
