= São Pedro da Água Branca =

- Municipality
- The Municipality of São Pedro da Água Branca
- Location of São Pedro da Água Branca
- Coordinates: 05°05′06″S 48°25′44″W
- Country: Brazil
- Region: Northeast
- State: Maranhão
- Founded: June 5, 1996

Government
  - Mayor: Idelzio Gonçalves de Oliveira (PTB)

Area
  - Total: 720.492 km^{2} (278.184 sq mi)

Population (2020)
  - Total: 12,735
  - Density: 15.5/km^{2} (40/sq mi)
- Time zone: UTC−3 (BRT)
- HDI (2000): 0.588 – medium

São Pedro da Água Branca is the westernmost municipality in the Brazilian state of Maranhão, bordering both Pará and Tocantins states.

The city has one of the most important railway stations on the Carajás Railway line.
