= São João do Araguaia =

Coordinates: 5°23′S 48°46′W

- Municipality
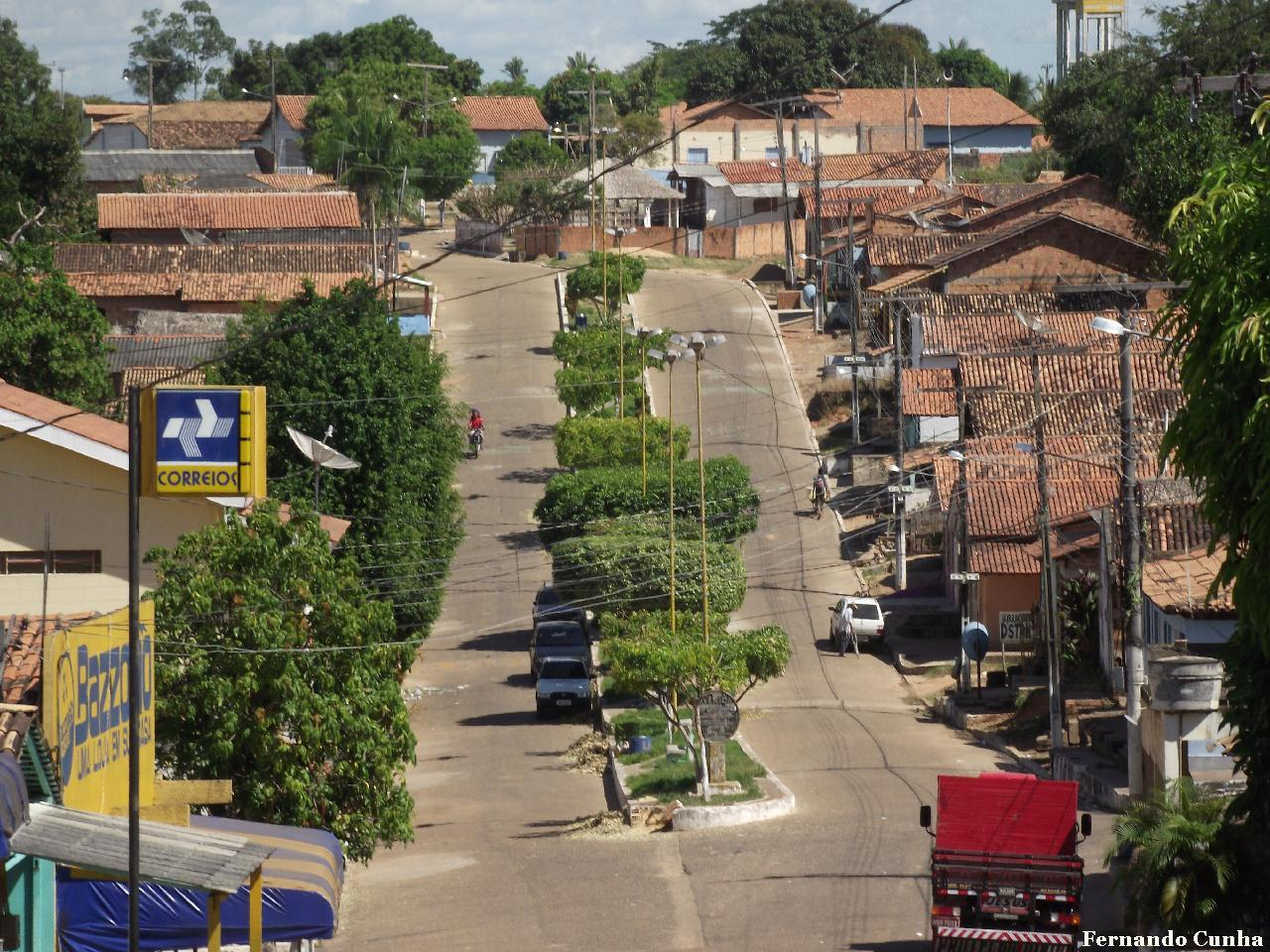
- View of São João do Araguaia

- Flag
- Interactive map of São João do Araguaia
- Country: Brazil
- Region: Northern
- State: Pará
- Mesoregion: Sudeste Paraense

Population (2020)
  - Total: 14,051
- Time zone: UTC−3 (BRT)

São João do Araguaia is a municipality in the state of Pará in the Northern region of Brazil.

== See also ==
- List of municipalities in Pará
