= Breu Branco =

- Municipality
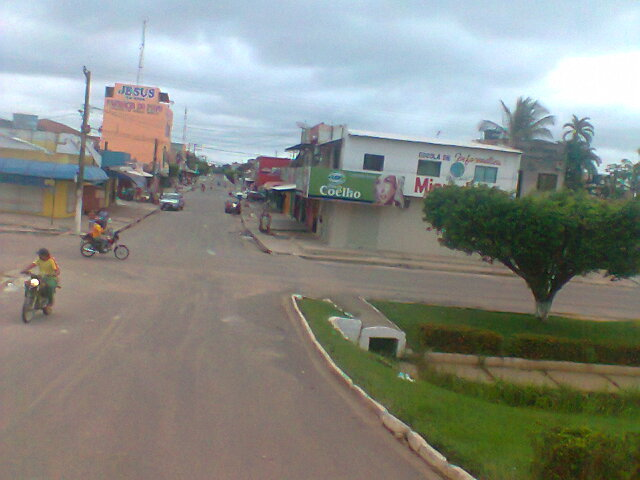

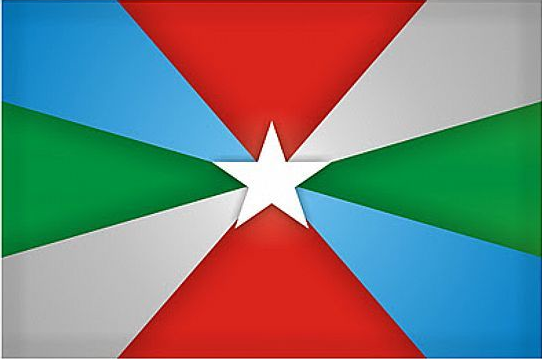
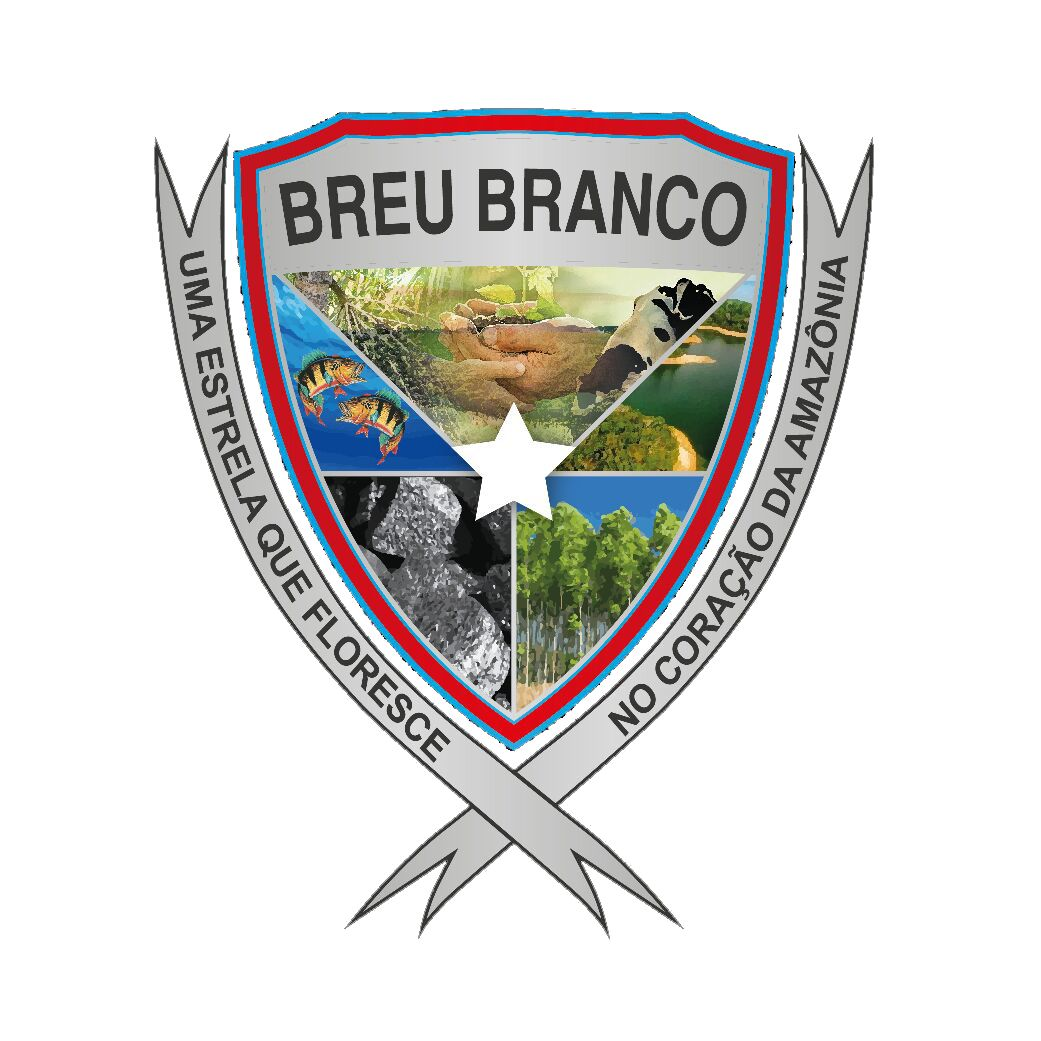
- Flag Coat of arms
- Interactive map of Breu Branco
- Country: Brazil
- Region: Northern
- State: Pará
- Mesoregion: Sudeste Paraense

Population (2020)
  - Total: 67,332
- Time zone: UTC−3 (BRT)

Breu Branco is a municipality in the state of Pará in the Northern region of Brazil.

The name Breu Branco refers to the resin of the almécega tree (Protium heptaphyllum). The village originated in 1907 with the construction of the Tocantins Railroad. Already in 1908, the villagers joined a movement that tried to emancipate the south-east of Pará, joining it with Goiás. The railroad brought prosperity through the trade of cashew, but was deactivated in 1973. In 1980, the village was submerged by the Tucuruí Dam and the inhabitants were relocated to a new village Breu Branco. In 1991, it became a municipality.

The village Moru (3°33′40″S 49°36′30″W) on the Tocantins was founded in 1793, when the Portuguese transferred a group of Aruã there from the island Marajó.

== History ==
The emergence of the current municipality of Breu Branco is related to the construction of the Tucuruí hydroelectric plant. Existing as a village since the 1900s, it gained its current configuration in 1980, when the inhabitants of the old village were relocated. The settlement of "Breu Velho" (as the old village of Breu Branco is popularly called) was submerged by the hydroelectric lake.

Breu Velho was located between the old village of Jatobal (also submerged by the lake) and the city of Tucuruí. It was a village with approximately 400 houses built on sandy land and in the stilt style. Its residents mainly traded Brazil nuts, which supplied both the domestic and foreign markets. The production was transported mainly by the Tocantins Railroad and soon after by the Tocantins River.

== See also ==
- List of municipalities in Pará
