= Jacundá =

Coordinates: 4°27′03″S 49°06′57″W

- Municipality
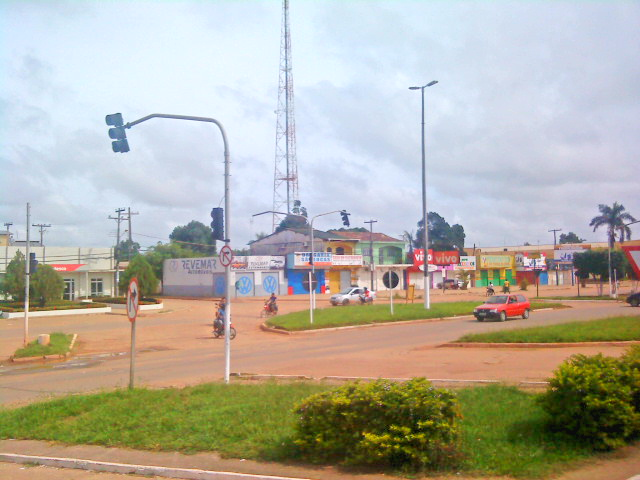
- Downtown Jacundá

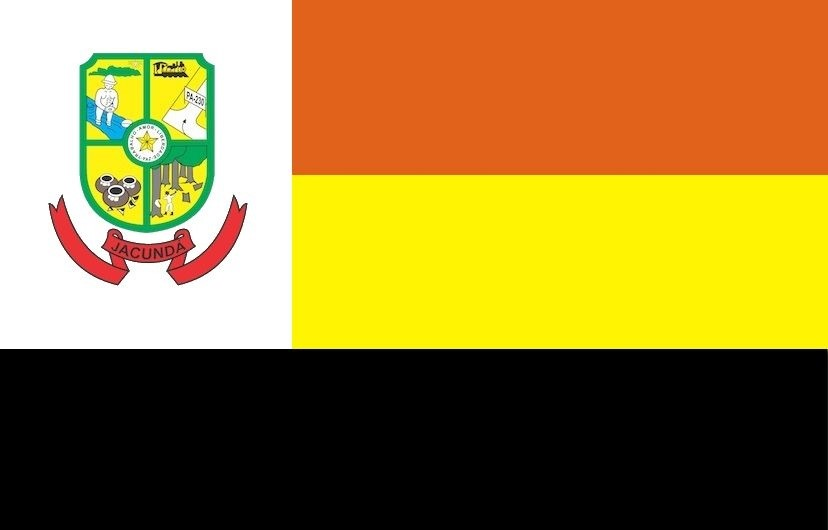
- Flag

- Location of Jacundá in Pará and Brazil
- Country: Brazil
- Region: Northern
- State: Pará
- Mesoregion: Sudeste Paraense
- Microregion: Tucuruí
- Founded: 1961

Government
  - Myor: Dino (PT)

Area
  - Total: 775,415 sq mi (2,008,315 km^{2})
- Elevation: 354 ft (108 m)

Population (2020)
  - Total: 59,842
  - Density: 0.077174/sq mi (0.029797/km^{2})
- Time zone: UTC−3 (BRT)
- HDI (2000): 0.622 – medium (2010 UNDP)

Jacundá is a municipality in the state of Pará in the Northern region of Brazil. A considerable part of its economy is based on logging.

== See also ==
- List of municipalities in Pará
