= Tapirapé-Aquiri National Forest =

Protected forest in Pará, Brazil

- Floresta Nacional do Tapirape-Aquiri
- IUCN category VI (protected area with sustainable use of natural resources)
- Location within Brazil
- Nearest city: Parauapebas, Pará
- Coordinates: 5°48′29″S 50°46′26″W
- Area: 196,503.94 hectares (485,571.8 acres)
- Designation: National forest
- Created: 5 May 1989
- Administrator: Chico Mendes Institute for Biodiversity Conservation

Tapirapé-Aquiri National Forest (Portuguese: Floresta Nacional do Tapirapé-Aquiri) is a national forest in the state of Pará, Brazil. It is surrounded by other protected areas, so has suffered relatively little from deforestation.

== Location ==
The Tapirapé-Aquiri National Forest is in the Amazon biome. It has an area of 196,503.94 hectares (485,571.8 acres). It covers parts of the municipalities of Marabá, São Félix do Xingu and Parauapebas in the state of Pará.

After granting the mining concession for the rich iron ore deposits in the Carajás Mountains, the federal government created three protected areas around the concession: the Igarapé Gelado Environmental Protection Area, the Tapirapé Biological Reserve and the Tapirapé-Aquiri National Forest. These areas, together with the Carajás National Forest, form a continuous block around the Carajás Mineral Province. The forest borders the Tapirapé Biological Reserve to the north, the Carajás National Forest to the east, the Xikrin do Cateté Indigenous Territory to the south and the Itacaiúnas National Forest to the west, with which it overlaps. The surrounding protected areas form a contiguous block of 1,310,000 hectares (3,200,000 acres) and isolate the Tapirapé-Aquiri, which according to its management plan has no resident population.

== Environment ==
The climate is moist tropical with a dry winter from June to October. Average annual rainfall is 2,000 to 2,400 millimetres (79 to 94 in). Monthly temperatures are always above 18 °C (64 °F). All of the eastern portion is in the Itacaiúnas River basin. The forest is covered by open submontane rainforest, dense submontane rainforest and alluvial rainforest, generally undisturbed due to its inaccessible location, although it is threatened to some extent by illegal logging, mineral prospecting and predatory hunting and fishing. The indigenous community of Xicrin do Cateté collects Castanhas do Pará nuts for commercial sale, and engages in subsistence hunting.

== Conservation ==
The Tapirapé-Aquiri National Forest was created by decree 97.720 of 5 May 1989. It is administered by the Chico Mendes Institute for Biodiversity Conservation (ICMBio). It is classed as IUCN protected area category VI (protected area with sustainable use of natural resources). The objective is sustainable multiple use of forest resources and scientific research, with emphasis on sustainable exploitation of native forest. The advisory council was appointed on 22 April 2005 with the main goal of developing the management plan, which was approved on 5 December 2006. Protected species include Uta Hick's bearded saki (Chiropotes utahicki), jaguar (Panthera onca) and cougar (Puma concolor). The proposed South Amazon Ecological Corridor would link the conservation unit to other protected areas and indigenous territories in the region.

== Sources ==
- Ayres, José Márcio; Da Fonseca, Gustavo A. B.; Rylands, Anthony B.; Queiroz, Helder L.; Pinto, Luiz Paulo; Masterson, Donald; Cavalcanti, Roberto B. (2005), Os Corredores Ecológicos das Florestas Tropicais do Brasil (PDF) (in Portuguese), Sociedade Civil Mamirauá, archived from the original (PDF) on 2016-07-31
- Flona do Tapirape-aquiri (in Portuguese), Chico Mendes Institute for Biodiversity Conservation
- FLONA de Carajás (in Portuguese), ISA: Instituto Socioambiental
- FLONA do Tapirapé-Aquiri (in Portuguese), ISA: Instituto Socioambiental
- Floresta Nacional de Tapirapé - Aquiri (in Portuguese), Via Rural, archived from the original on June 10, 2016
- Unidade de Conservação: Floresta Nacional de Tapirape-Aquiri (in Portuguese), MMA: Ministério do Meio Ambiente
