= Marabá, Pará =

Marabá
- Municipality
- The Municipality of Marabá
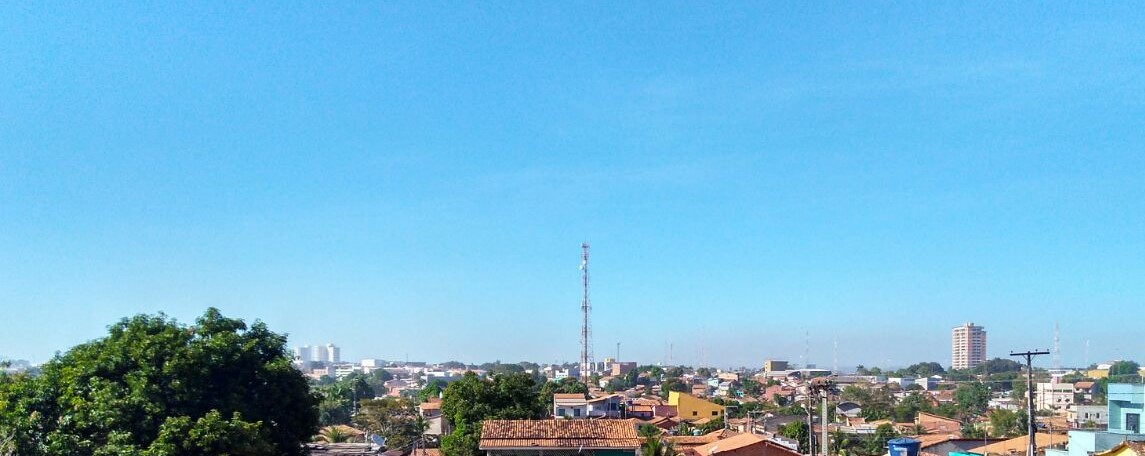
- Panoramic view of Marabá, from the administrative block of the Marabá Industrial Campus of the Federal Institute of Pará.

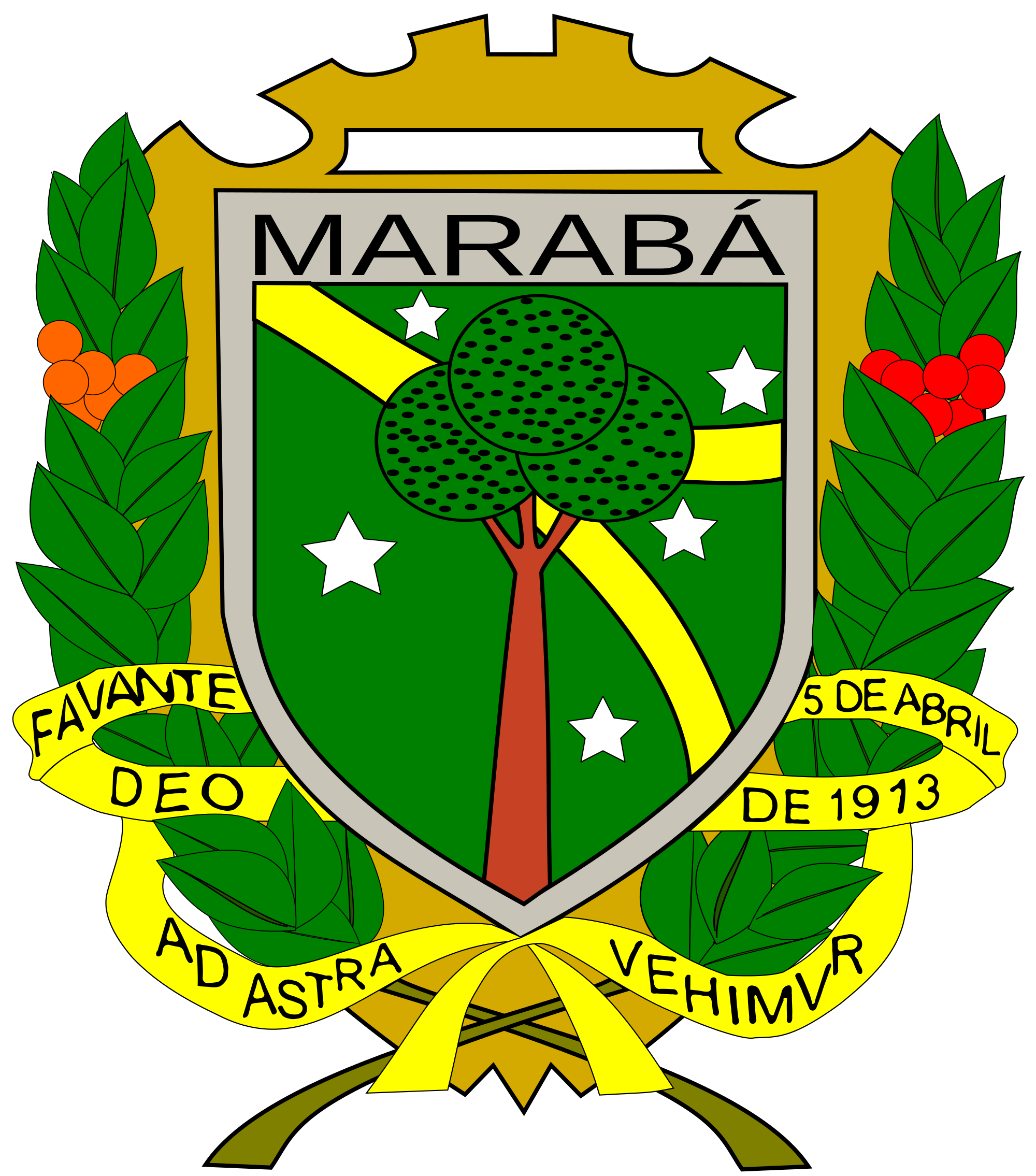
- Flag Coat of arms
- Nickname: "Capital do estado do Carajás" (State capital of Carajás)
- Location of Marabá in the State of Pará

- Location in Brazil
- Coordinates: 5°21′00″S 49°07′00″W
- Country: Brazil
- Region: Northern
- State: Pará
- Founded: December of 1894
- Emancipated: February 27, 1913

Government
  - Mayor: Antonio Carlos Cunha Sá (PL)

Area
  - Municipality: 15,092.268 km^{2} (5,827.157 sq mi)
- IBGE/2002

Population (2025)
  - Municipality: 290,975
  - Density: 19.2797/km^{2} (49.9343/sq mi)
  - Urban: 218,914
  - Seat/City: 239,719
- Demonym: marabaense
- Time zone: UTC-3 (BRT)
- Postcode: 68500-000 to 68515-000
- Area code: (+55) 94
- HDI (2010): 0.668 – medium (UNDP/2010)
- Website: Official website

Marabá is a municipality in the state of Pará, Brazil. Its greatest geographic reference is the confluence of two large rivers near the historic city center, the Itacaiunas River and the Tocantins River, forming a "Y" if seen from space. It basically consists of six urban centers linked by five highways.

Marabá is the fourth-most-populous municipality in the state of Pará, approximately 283,542 inhabitants according to the IBGE/2020, and the fourth largest GDP in the state of Pará, with US$1.543.254,34 according to the IDESP/2010. It's the main center of political, social, and economic development in southern of Pará and one of the most dynamic municipalities in Brazil.

Marabá has a strategic position and is crossed by five highways. It also has a large logistics infrastructure, with a port, airport, and railway. The municipality has a growing industrial park. The steel industry is especially important to Marabá's vast agricultural frontier. Marabá also has a strong trade and services sector.

Marabá is characterized by its broad mix of peoples and cultures that do justice to the meaning of the town's nickname: "Son of Miscegenation."

== Etymology ==
The word "Marabá" derives from the indigenous vocable "Mayr-Abá", which simply means "son of the indigenous woman with a white man."

A poem written by poet Gonçalves Dias inspired by the merchant Francisco Silva to its commercial name of "Casa Marabá" (Maraba House). This was located the banks of the Tocantins River, and served as a strategic business point for exchanging all kinds of products and services.

== History ==
The settlement of the river basin Itacaiunas played an important factor in shaping the city, because even though this region was later colonized by the Portuguese Empire in the sixteenth century, remained without a permanent settler occupation for almost 300 years. Only in 1894 is, in fact, the space was occupied by settlers.

=== Colonization ===
The first to participate in the colonization of the territory of Marabá, in 1894, were the political leaders who had escaped from political guerrillas in the northern Province of Goiás, specifically the city of Boa Vista. One of those leaders was Carlos Leitao, who traveled with his group to the southeast of the province of Grão-Pará and established its first camp in downstream Itacaiunas River, in December 1894. A definitive village was established on the left bank of the Tocantins River, about 10 km downstream from the other camp, the place that Carlos Leitao called "Burgo do Itacayúna" (Burgo's Itacayúna). After a few months, the extraction of rubber latex began in the "Burgo's Itacayúna" region.

In 1895 Carlos Gomes Leitão asks the President of the Province of Grão-Pará, José Paes de Carvalho, funding for the extraction and commercialization of rubber in addition to getting drugs to be used specifically to combat tropical diseases. To get funding, Carlos Leitão disseminating information on the extraction of rubber in small colony of Burgo's Itacayúna and its surroundings. Immediately there is the first population explosion of the locality where the rubber tappers, fishermen and hunters settle in the village of Burgo.

=== Foundation of Pontal do Itacayúna ===
The merchant Francisco Coelho da Silva would have been the first to settle in the area downstream of Rio Itacaiunas, crucial to the foundation of the village of "Pontal do Itacayúna" (Pontal of Itacayúna). The goal of Francisco Silva, while riding the village of Pontal of Itacayúna, was to negotiate with the rubber tappers who sought to sell the rubber collected in the region.

The official historiography Francisco Silva assigns the authorship of the current name of the city. He had installed in the village of Pontal of Itacayúna a commercial point called "Casa Marabá" (House Marabá), which years later would be used to name the until then village Pontal of Itacayúna.

With the death of Colonel Carlos Leitão in 1903, the village of Burgo's Itacayúna is disabled and Leitão family along with other residents move to the village of Pontal do Itacayúna. In 1904 the village of the Pontal shall be called "Marabá" and host the borough, with the installation of the police detachment.

=== Formation of the municipality ===
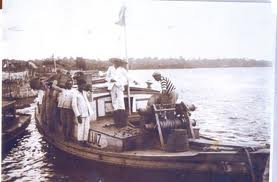
Shipment of Brazil nuts in small boats.

The economy of the village of Marabá grew considerably supported by the extractive base, anchored in exports of rubber and Brazil-nut to U.S. and European markets. The economic importance gained, influenced the political aspects, so that in the years 1908 to 1909 a major rebellion occurred in Maraba, called of "Revolta dos Galegos" (Revolt of the Galicians). The rebellion was demanding political autonomy from the county of Baião, and the low prices paid for rubber and the highest interest rate on loans for collecting nuts and rubber.

Retaliating against the rebellion of Maraba the government of the province of Grão-Pará does not meet demands by emancipation. However the enormous pressure and influence of the local society has made the provincial government gave in and finally initiate negotiations for the creation of the municipality of Marabá.

That culminated on February 27, 1913 Maraba achieved political autonomy and became a municipality. The first mayor of Maraba was the military Antonio Maia, who took office as appointed by the President of the Province of Grão-Pará.

In subsequent years the migratory flow to the region of Marabá increased considerably. During the 1920s, immigrants moved to Maraba mainly to participate in the extraction and sale of Brazil nuts, andiroba, copaiba oils and rubber. And from the 1930s moved to Maraba, in order to work in the diamond mines that were on the banks of the Tocantins River.

In 1929, Marabá becomes illuminated by a power plant that operated the base from burning wood. In November 1935 the local airport is opened and the first plane lands in this. Maraba in this period consists of 450 houses and 1.500 inhabitants fixed.

=== The 1970s ===
With the construction of Highway PA-70, in 1969, Maraba is connected to the Belém-Brasília Highway. The implementation of road infrastructure was part of the Brazilian military government's strategy to integrate the Amazon region to the rest of the country. All this was part of the integration strategy of the Amazon territory, especially the region of Marabá, where was undertaken mainly the official plan of agricultural colonization, the construction of the Tucuruí Hydroelectric Power, the implementation of "Projeto Grande Carajás" (Greater Carajas Project), and even the discovery of large gold deposits of the Serra Pelada. All these projects were centered in Marabá, and contributed to the economic and population boom that occurred in the city between 1970 and 1980.

In 1970 the city was declared a National Security Area (legal position allowing direct intervention of the Brazilian central government), a condition that lasted until the end of the Brazilian military dictatorship in 1985. Besides having strategic importance to the policy of national integration, Marabá region was the only region of Brazil where there was fighting between the army and the guerrillas of the PCdoB party who want to topple the military regime and establish a communist regime in Brazil. Then performed an Araguaia guerrilla movement, which forced the Brazilian government to Marabá to send a large contingent of troops of the Brazilian Army. The city has become since then one of the bases for military operations troops of the Brazilian Armed Forces.

In 1970 it launched the "Programa de Integração Nacional" (National Integration Program), which, among other things, provided for the construction of the Trans-Amazon Highway, whose first section opened in 1971, along with the creation of a post of the National Institute of Colonization and Agrarian Reform in Marabá. With the completion of construction of the Trans-Amazon Highway, the flow of immigrants towards Maraba became very large, and in less than a decade the city has been radically transformed, from a small urban center on the banks of the Tocantins River (in Maraba time had only 20,000 inhabitants), a main city in the region with over 100,000 inhabitants.

=== The 1980s ===
In 1980 the city was devastated by the biggest flood in its history, when the Tocantins River rose 17.42 meters. As a result, there was a redesign of the city's expansion, with the construction of urban areas planned of the "Cidade Nova" (New City) and "Nova Marabá" (New Marabá), to the detriment of traditional urban area of the "Velha Marabá" (Old Marabá). New urban areas have also emerged over the decade, highlighting the "São Félix" (St. Félix) and the "Morada Nova" (New Morada).

In 1984, comes into operation the Carajás Railway, which has Marabá as center of operations; in 1988 and come into operation the first two steel mills for the production of pig iron.

In 1987 there was a conflict that became known as the Massacre of St. Boniface. The battle took place between the miners of Serra Pelada and the battalion of the "Polícia Militar" (Military Police of the state of Pará), with the support of the Brazilian Army. The event that preceded the massacre was blocking access to the Mixed Bridge of Marabá, in demonstration of the reopening of Serra Pelada mine and the lowering of the mining pit. A Police battalion was sent to unlock the bridge, but on reaching the spot shot with firearms against protesters to force their withdrawal. Officially nine people died in the conflict.

The municipality contains part of the 99,271 hectares (245,300 acres) Tapirapé Biological Reserve, a strictly protected conservation unit created in 1989.

=== Recent facts ===
In 2008, the industrial park of Marabá reaches its peak with the onset of steel production, declining in the same year due to the Great Recession that has hit the European, American and Chinese markets, which were the targets of local production.

The crisis greatly affected the collection of taxes and other local businesses, forcing layoffs and major disruptions of projects and investments. The effects in industrial park of Marabá were very large, forcing the closure of 10 of the 11 steel-metallurgical industries. The city's economy is slowly recovering, with the reopening of some steel mills since 2013.

In 2011, Marabá actively participated in all of southeast Pará plebiscite on division that defined the state of Pará. Marabá established itself during the process as the center of discussions in the region about the project division, to be the leading candidate to be state capital of Carajás. The plebiscite took place on December 11, 2011. Municipality at 93.26% of the votes were in favor of establishing Carajás.

== Geography ==
Occupying an area of 15,092,268 km², Marabá counts, in 2017, with 271,594 inhabitants, being the tenth most populous municipality of the North region of Brazil. The municipal seat has the following geographical coordinates: 05º 21 '54 "South latitude and 049º 07' 24" longitude WGr. Located in southeastern Pará, in the Marabá microregion, it is bordered by the municipalities of: Novo Repartimento, Itupiranga, Nova Ipixuna and Rondon do Pará (to the north); São Geraldo do Araguaia, Eldorado dos Carajás, Curionópolis and Parauapebas (to the south); Bom Jesus do Tocantins, São João do Araguaia and São Domingos do Araguaia (to the east); and São Félix do Xingu (to the west).

The topography of the municipality of Marabá presents the highest altitudes in the Southeast region of Pará, through the Carajás, Sereno, Buritirama, Paredão, Encontro, Gray and Misteriosa mountains. Of this complex, stands out the Carajás mountain range, like the one of greater size. However, it is in the Serra do Cinzento that the maximum altitude of the municipality of Marabá is found, with 792 meters. The Carajás, Cinzento and Buritirana mountains are located in conservation areas, under federal jurisdiction, called the Tapirapé-Aquiri National Forest ( 196,504 hectares (485,570 acres) sustainable use conservation unit created in 1989.) and the Tapirapé Biological Reserve, where several caves are found. Its forms of relief are encompassed by the morphostructural unit denominated Peripheral Depression of the South of Pará, where they dominate the amazonian plateaus.

The vegetation cover of the municipality of Marabá is quite diverse. The fitofisionomy of the forests of the municipality of Marabá is characterized by three types: the open ombrophylous forest, the dense ombrophylous forest and the anthropic areas. In the urban area of Marabá, the anthropic forests predominate. Because of its diverse nature, the municipality holds one of the largest natural heritage sites in Brazil, housing large forest reserves such as the Tapirapé Biological Reserve, with 103,000 ha (1,030 km²), and the Tapirapé-Aquiri National Forest with 190,000 hectares ha (1,900 km²), in addition to the Mãe Maria Indigenous Land, with 64,488,416 ha (644.88 km²), which is close to the municipal seat of Marabá, belonging to the municipality of Bom Jesus do Tocantins.

Marabá is located in a low altitude area in the connexion of two rivers - Itacaiúnas and Tocantins - and suffers from annual floods due to the topography and direct influence of four rivers: Itacaiunas, Tocantins, Tauarizinho and Sororó. In addition to the basins related to these rivers, the municipality is inserted in the basins of the rivers Aquiri, Tapirape, Gray, Black, Parauapebas and Red. Of these, the basins of the Tapirapé, Cinzento and Preto rivers are included totally in the area of the municipality. The basin of Itacaiúnas stands out for bathing the whole municipality, in whose mouth is the municipal headquarters of Marabá and covers the largest area, that is, 5,383.4 km².

== Economy ==
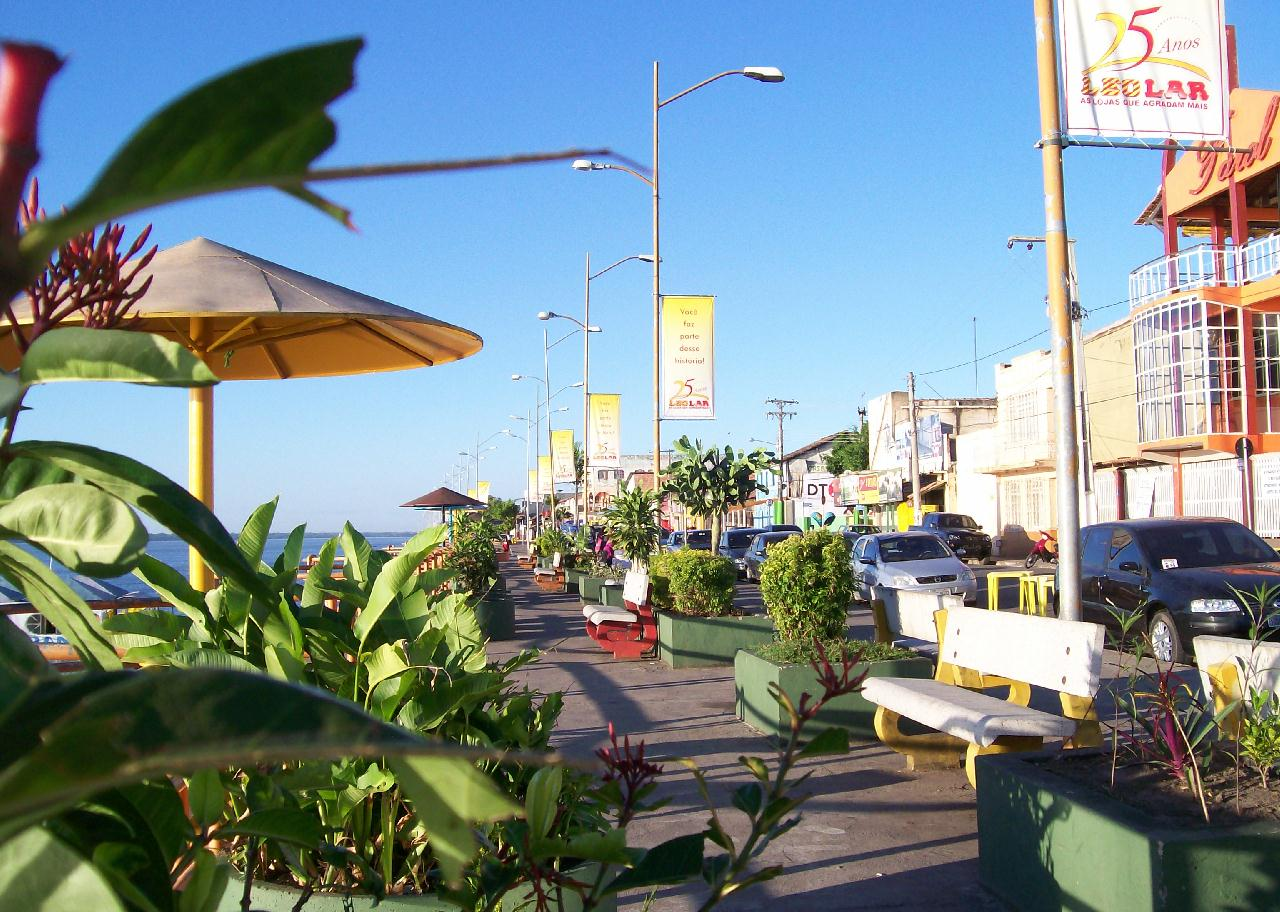
trade in Maraba.

The municipality of Maraba experienced various economic cycles. Until the early 1980s economy was based on the extraction plant. At first revolved around the extraction of latex rubber, whose lucrative attracted large numbers of the Northeast. Since the late nineteenth century (1892) until the late 1940s, was marked by the extraction of the rubber boom that has contributed greatly to the economy of the city and the region, however, the rubber crisis led the council to a new cycle . This time, the cycle of Brazil nuts, which for years led the municipal economy. There was also the cycle of diamonds between 1920 and 1940, which were mainly found on the river Tocantins. With the discovery of Serra Pelada Maraba went through cycles of mining mostly the extraction of gold.

Since the early 1970s installation of the Grande Carajás project and steel industries diversified and boosted the local economy.

=== Primary sector ===
Today, Maraba is the economic center and a vast administrative region of the Amazon agricultural frontier ", the city has one of the most significant economic growth in the country. Livestock based on cattle ranching is an activity of great importance for the municipality, and ensure the livelihoods of the population, provides the regional and local development by creating large scale, and is marketed in different Brazilian regions and abroad. The herd area is highlighted by its superior quality, being one of the most important cattle herds of the state, a result arising from the use of advanced technology in the selection and fertilization. It has also herds of pigs, horses, sheep and poultry

The fishing sector also has a key role in local economic base by exporting its surplus for the entire north and northeast. Agriculture is diversified, with production cereals, pulses and oilseeds such as corn, rice and beans, fruits such as bananas and acai, and logging

=== Secondary sector ===
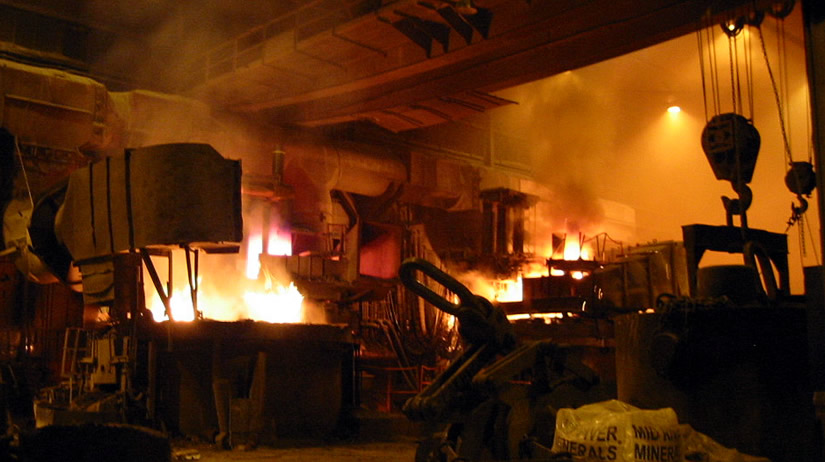
Inside a steel plant.

Through the Industrial Development Company of Para - CDI, was installed at the end of the eighties, in an area of 1,300 hectares, the industrial district of Maraba - DIM, to create the base of a steel pole targeting the Carajas iron ore, exploited by the mining company Vale.

Metallurgical Industries and intense livestock activity, accounted for a large environmental devastation in the region. The activity of the steel industry requires large amounts of coal, leading to a devastation of native forests. As a result of public pressure the industries were forced to change its production model, investing in reforestation and charcoal production through the babassu coconut palm.

Besides, to have more than 200 industries, and the steel (pig iron) most important, second is the timber industry and the manufacture of tiles and bricks. The city's economy also relies on the production of manganese and Agribusiness. In Maraba, Agribusiness works with pulp processing, cassava flour, rice processing, milk and palm.

The installation of steel plant came boost the local economy even more, forming a metal pole-mechanical, with a view to verticalize the local mineral production. There are still projects that seen during and after the installation of steel works, among them: The gas pipeline Açailândia-Maraba and construction of new port city.

=== Tertiary sector ===
The trade and services sector also has its share of contribution. Maraba has approximately 5 000 outlets divided between trade formed by micro, small, medium and large businesses and services, Hospital, Financial, Education, Construction and Public Utilities. It is a very powerful and comes with high rates of growth. This is because the strategy of state government, to decentralize services from the state capital, Belém. The city is increasingly gaining representation in hosting numerous public institutions. The trade of the city is highlighted, because the city is a major regional commercial hub of South and Southeast of Pará.

Marabá is served by João Correa da Rocha Airport.

== Culture and leisure ==
=== Tourism ===
Bordered by two major rivers, the area offers tourism opportunities to residents and visitors, such as Tucunaré beach (Praia do Tucunaré), Municipal Museum, Orla do Rio, Povoado de Mumbuca, Carajas National Forest (Floresta Nacional De Carajas).

Beach Tucunaré (Peacock Bass)

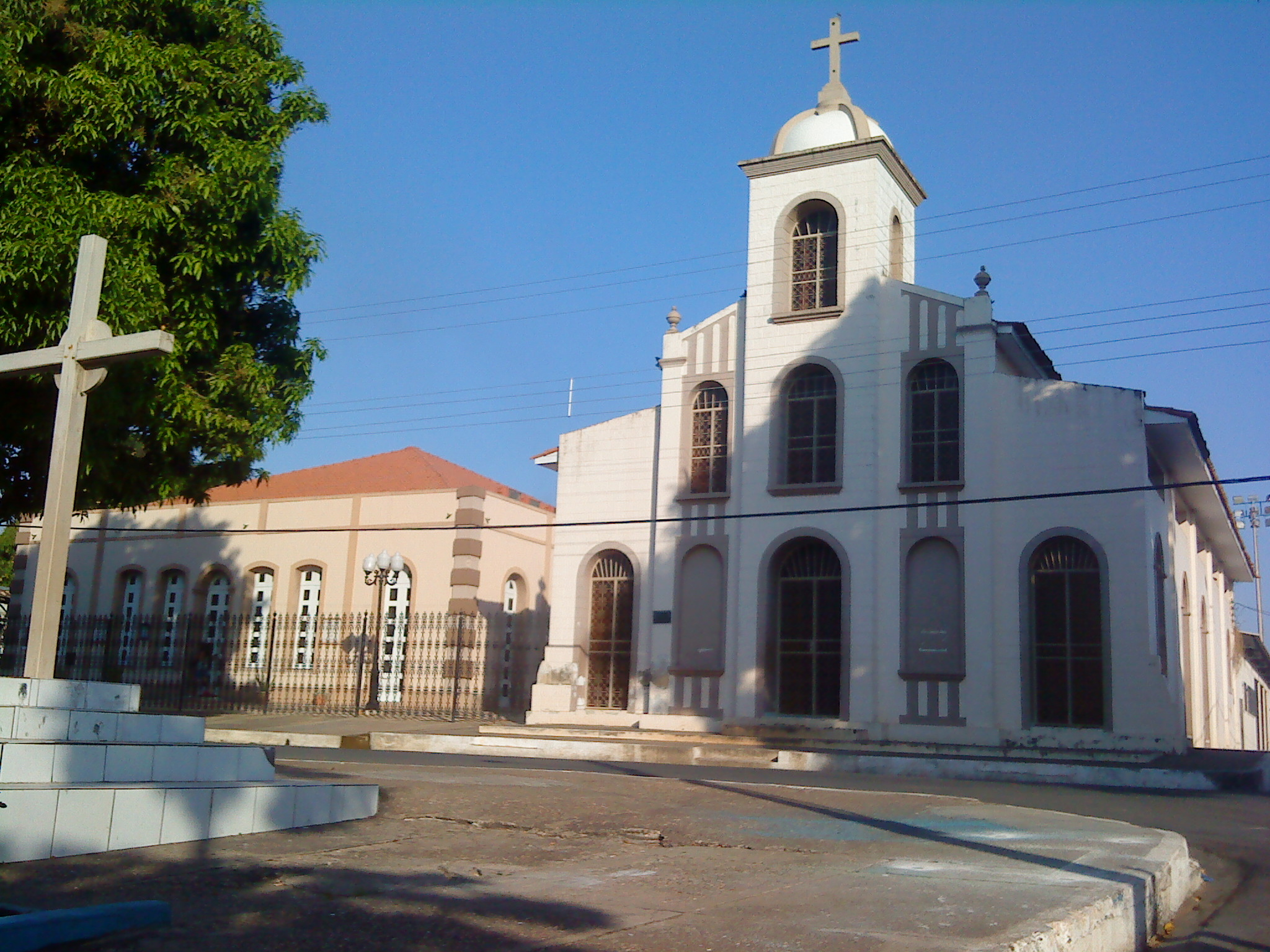
Church of St. Felix of Valois and the Municipal Library on the left (Old Market Hall).

The Beach Peacock Bass is the most visited tourist spot in town. Emerging from the ebb of the Tocantins River, just after the rainy season the beach occupies an area of approximately 5 km ², of which three quarters are of fine sand and one quarter of vegetation. Situated opposite the central region of Maraba, the sands of the island are sighted in mid-April, but their high season is in July, making it the main attraction of the city.

The beach provides vacationers, practice water sports and sandy, camping, fishing, and various attractions promoted by the Municipality.

Beach geladinho

Located opposite the district of São Félix, also appears in the summer with the decrease in the level of the river Tocantins. The rail and road bridge over the river Tocantins has been used to transport the ore extracted from the Serra dos Carajás.

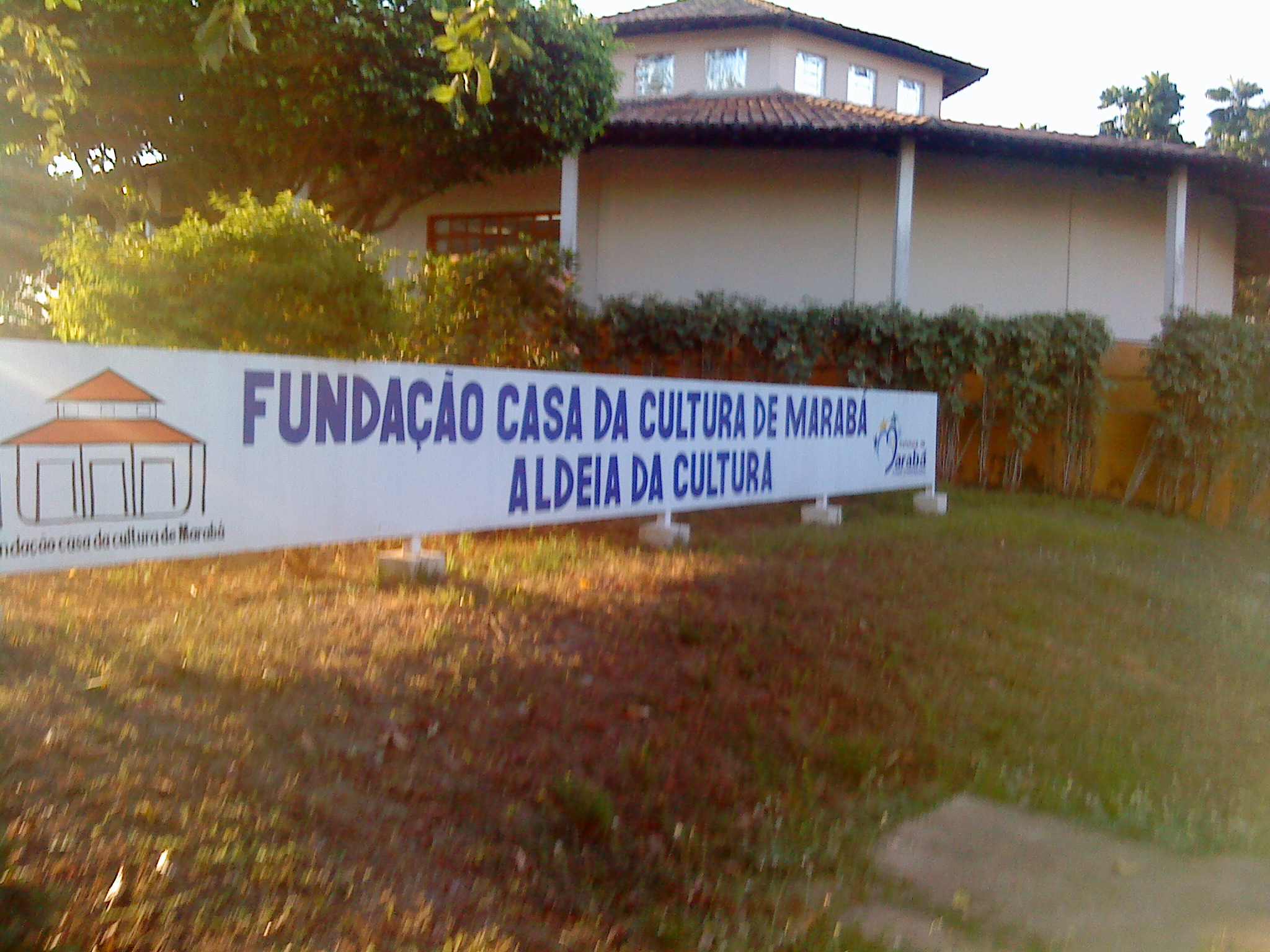
House of the Culture Foundation of Maraba.

Church of St. Felix of Valois

It was the first chapel built in Maraba. The first building was destroyed by the flooding of rivers in 1926, then another church was erected on the same site. It is the first historical heritage of the city, officially recognized on April 5, 1993. The church is located in Piazza San Felix, in the central city

Palace Augusto Dias

Palace built in the 1930s, which served as the seat of legislative power and the judicial power of the municipality. Today it is a museum.

Municipal Museum of Maraba

The Municipal Museum is installed at the Foundation House of Culture of Maraba and includes the following sectors: Division of Anthropology, Department of Botany, Department of Geology, Department of Archaeology and Department of Zoology. In addition to host school of Music, the municipal public archives, the Museum makes several studies on the region southeast of Pará, rescuing and preserving local history. The museum has the support and guidance of the Goeldi Museum, in relation to the training of technicians and identification of the material through an agreement with the institution. The Municipal Museum of Maraba is one of Brazil's most respected institutions in the framework of research, rescue, environmental and historical preservation.

=== Sport ===
Águia de Marabá Futebol Clube, the city's principal football club won the state championship in 2010 and reached the Copa do Brasil semi-finals in 2009. In 2010, it placed 8th on the National Championship's Serie C.

== Urban subdivisions ==
The six urban centers.

Maraba is subdivided into six urban centers:

- Cidade Nova
- Industrial
- Morada Nova
- Nova Marabá
- São Félix
- Velha Marabá

== Infrastructure ==
Marabá has a significant infrastructure compared to the municipalities of the Carajás region, but compared to other medium cities in the North and Northeast regions of Brazil, it is far below this level.

The service of water and sewage of Marabá is made by Sanitation Company of Pará (Companhia de Saneamento do Pará - Cosanpa). The water consumed by the inhabitants of Marabá comes from the Tocantins and Itacaiunas rivers, which goes through treatment in the municipal water treatment plants.

The electric power is provided by the company Power Plants of Pará (Centrais Elétricas do Pará - Celpa), which has four substations, one in the neighborhood of Folha 19, one in the Jardim Vitória neighborhood, one in the Gabriel Pimenta neighborhood (Morada Nova district) and another in the Industrial district. The substation located in the district of Morada Nova, is the distribution center of the North-South network of the Eletrobrás system, which supplies power to the Southeast of Brazil.

In December 2017, Marabá had 53 banks and financial establishments, between branches and service stations, with credit operations at 288 112,00 thousand reais (2008), and savings of 109,804 thousand reais (2008), in addition to nine agencies and a regional Post Office.

=== Education ===
Marabá counts on schools in practically all the regions of the municipality, however, it is far from being among its best indicators. The schools in the state network have infra-structure below the ideal, and are mostly scrapped, mainly in the rural area. The municipal school network has schools in better conditions reaching the goal of the IDEB 2015 for the municipality (4.1), however, in the general assessment according to the Public Prosecutor's Office, education is still poor quality.

Regarding professional and higher education, the municipality counts about 30 units of education, a relatively high number, compared to municipalities that are not capitals in the northern region of Brazil. The public universities maintain 7 campus and poles in the municipality, with emphasis on the Federal University of Southern and Southeastern Pará, the Pará State University and the Federal Institute of Pará (the latter with the path of becoming the Federal Institute of the South and Southeast of Pará). With this profile, Marabá is considered the first locality of the interior of the Amazon with profile of "polo/university city".

== Climate ==
Climate data for Marabá (1991–2020)
| Month | Jan | Feb | Mar | Apr | May | Jun | Jul | Aug | Sep | Oct | Nov | Dec | Year |
|---|---|---|---|---|---|---|---|---|---|---|---|---|---|
| Mean daily maximum °C (°F) | 31.4 (88.5) | 31.5 (88.7) | 31.8 (89.2) | 32.4 (90.3) | 33.1 (91.6) | 33.7 (92.7) | 34.4 (93.9) | 35.2 (95.4) | 34.5 (94.1) | 33.7 (92.7) | 32.6 (90.7) | 31.8 (89.2) | 33.0 (91.4) |
| Daily mean °C (°F) | 26.6 (79.9) | 26.6 (79.9) | 26.7 (80.1) | 27.2 (81.0) | 27.7 (81.9) | 27.9 (82.2) | 27.9 (82.2) | 28.5 (83.3) | 28.6 (83.5) | 28.3 (82.9) | 27.7 (81.9) | 27.1 (80.8) | 27.6 (81.7) |
| Mean daily minimum °C (°F) | 23.2 (73.8) | 23.2 (73.8) | 23.3 (73.9) | 23.7 (74.7) | 23.7 (74.7) | 23.1 (73.6) | 22.5 (72.5) | 22.9 (73.2) | 23.9 (75.0) | 24.0 (75.2) | 23.9 (75.0) | 23.5 (74.3) | 23.4 (74.1) |
| Average precipitation mm (inches) | 273.4 (10.76) | 295.7 (11.64) | 342.9 (13.50) | 233.5 (9.19) | 125.8 (4.95) | 24.8 (0.98) | 15.1 (0.59) | 9.3 (0.37) | 42.2 (1.66) | 80.3 (3.16) | 151.3 (5.96) | 192.2 (7.57) | 1,786.5 (70.33) |
| Average precipitation days (≥ 1.0 mm) | 16 | 16 | 19 | 14 | 9 | 3 | 2 | 1 | 3 | 6 | 9 | 13 | 111 |
| Average relative humidity (%) | 87.1 | 87.3 | 86.9 | 87.0 | 86.4 | 83.7 | 80.5 | 79.6 | 80.8 | 82.3 | 84.3 | 86.3 | 84.4 |
| Mean monthly sunshine hours | 152.3 | 132.1 | 141.3 | 161.3 | 212 | 252.1 | 280.6 | 268.4 | 195.7 | 159.5 | 136.5 | 125.9 | 2,217.7 |
Source: Instituto Nacional de Meteorologia (sun 1981–2010)

== Statistics ==
- Elevation: 84 m
- Climate: Equatorial hot and dry
- Latitude South 05° 22' 08"
- Longitude West: 49° 07' 04"

Distances from other cities:

- Araguaína: 287 km
- Belém: 553 km
- Brasília: 1.407 km
- Fortaleza: 1.468 km
- Goiânia: 1.422 km
- Imperatriz: 235 km
- Palmas: 664 km
- Parauapebas: 171 km
- Rio de Janeiro: 2.566 km
- São Luís: 805 km
- São Paulo: 2.349 km
- Teresina: 883 km
- Salvador: 1963 km
- Belo Horizonte: 2135 km
- Buenos Aires, Argentina; 4107 km
- Asunción, Paraguai: 3049 km
