= Tapirapé Biological Reserve =

Protected area in Brazil

- Reserva Biológica do Tapirapé
- IUCN category Ia (strict nature reserve)
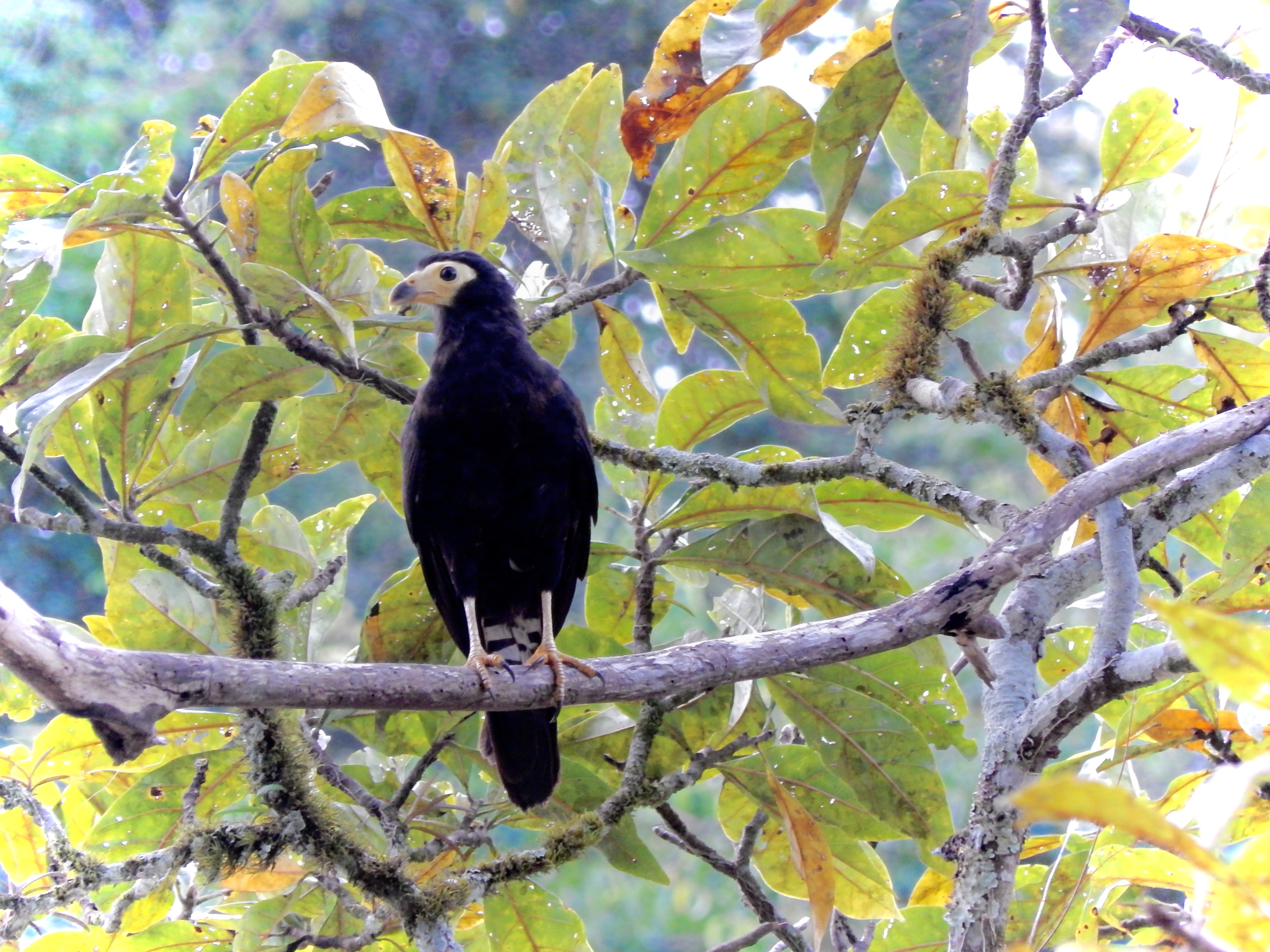

- Location within Brazil
- Location: Marabá and São Félix do Xingu, Pará, Brazil
- Nearest city: Parauapebas, Pará
- Coordinates: 5°35′28″S 50°36′40″W
- Area: 99,271 hectares (245,300 acres)
- Designation: Biological reserve
- Created: 5 May 1989

Tapirapé Biological Reserve (Portuguese: Reserva Biológica do Tapirapé) is a biological reserve in the state of Pará, Brazil.

== History ==
The reserve, which covers 99,271 hectares (245,300 acres), was established by decree on 5 May 1989. It is administered by the Chico Mendes Institute for Biodiversity Conservation. The reserve lies in the municipalities of Marabá and São Félix do Xingu in the state of Pará. It is located in the basins of the Tocantins River and Araguaia River. The reserve has two physical bases, of which the Bacaba Base can accommodate 20 people with basic infrastructure for researchers and students including a small laboratory room, a dock for small boats and security.

== Status ==
The Biological Reserve is a "strict nature reserve" under IUCN protected area category Ia. The purpose is to fully preserve the biota and other natural attributes without direct human interference. The conservation unit is supported by the Amazon Region Protected Areas Program. The reserve is in the Amazon biome and has vegetation typical of this biome. It includes dense and open rainforest, submontane and montane forest. Uta Hick's bearded saki (chiropotes utahicki) is a protected species in the reserve. The proposed South Amazon Ecological Corridor would link the conservation unit to other protected areas and indigenous territories in the region.

== Sources ==
- Ayres, José Márcio; Da Fonseca, Gustavo A. B.; Rylands, Anthony B.; Queiroz, Helder L.; Pinto, Luiz Paulo; Masterson, Donald; Cavalcanti, Roberto B. (2005), Os Corredores Ecológicos das Florestas Tropicais do Brasil (PDF) (in Portuguese), Sociedade Civil Mamirauá, archived from the original (PDF) on 2016-07-31
- Full list: PAs supported by ARPA, ARPA
- Reserva Biológica do Tapirapé (in Portuguese), Chico Mendes Institute for Biodiversity Conservation, archived from the original on 2014-03-03
- Unidade de Conservação: Reserva Biológica do Tapirapé (in Portuguese), MMA: Ministério do Meio Ambiente
