= Igarapé Gelado Environmental Protection Area =

Protected area in Pará, Brazil

- Area de Protecao Ambiental do Igarape Gelado
- IUCN category V (protected landscape/seascape)
- Location within Brazil
- Nearest city: Parauapebas, Pará
- Coordinates: 5.959°S 50.225°W
- Area: 23,285 hectares (57,540 acres)
- Designation: Environmental Protection Area
- Created: 5 May 1989

Igarapé Gelado Environmental Protection Area (Portuguese: Area de Protecao Ambiental do Igarape Gelado) is a protected area in the state of Pará, Brazil. It contains cultivated land and Amazon biome.

== Location ==
The protected area, which covers 23,285 hectares (57,540 acres) of the Amazon biome, was created on 5 May 1989. It is administered by the Chico Mendes Institute for Biodiversity Conservation. It lies within the Parauapebas municipality of the state of Pará.

== Conservation ==
The area is classed as IUCN protected area category V, protected landscape/seascape. The purpose is to protect biological diversity and control human activities to ensure sustainable use of natural resources. Protected species include Uta Hick's bearded saki (Chiropotes utahicki).

== Sources ==
- Área de Proteção Ambiental do Igarapé Gelado (in Portuguese), Chico Mendes Institute for Biodiversity Conservation, archived from the original on 2015-10-24
- Unidade de Conservação: Area de Protecao Ambiental do Igarape Gelado (in Portuguese), MMA: Ministério do Meio Ambiente
