= Flag of Pará =

Flag of the Brazilian state of Pará

State of Pará
- Use: Civil and state flag
- Proportion: 2:3
- Adopted: 3 June 1890
- Design: In the field of sips (red) a silver band (white), carried in the center of a blau star (blue).

The flag of the state of Pará is, along with the coat of arms and the anthem, one of the symbols of the state of Pará, Brazil as described in article 12 of the state constitution.

== History ==
One day after joining the nation of Brazil on November 16, 1889, as well as in its initial years, the flag of the Clube Republicano Paraense appeared as the state flag. Written by Philadelpho de Oliveira Condurú, it was described as follows:

Bandeira partida em pala, de vermelho, branco, vermelho com uma estrela azul no centro.

On April 10, 1890, the Municipal Council, on the proposal of its president, Artur Índio do Brasil, approved a project making the club's badge the flag of the municipality of Belém.

On June 3, 1890, a bill to make the flag official was presented by deputy Higino Amanajás in the State Chamber. Its content was as follows:

The Legislative Congress of the State of Pará decrees:

Art. 1 - The Flag of the State of Pará is considered to be the one that served as a badge for the Clube Republicano Paraense, before the proclamation of the Republic, and which in a session on April 10, 1890 was adopted as the Flag of the Municipality.

Art. 2 — Provisions to the contrary are renewed.

Ribeiro records that the project was never made official, being rejected in the senate, inspired by Governor Augusto Montenegro, on the grounds that all Brazilians should have the Brazilian flag as their only flag.

The current design of the flag, which was used as a reference in the creation of the official coat of arms in 1903, is composed as follows: a red rectangle with an oblique white stripe, running from the top left corner to the bottom right corner, and a blue star in the center of the flag.

== Symbolism ==
Flag of the Clube Republicano Paraense

The white stripe in the Flag of Pará represents the zodiac, the Equator and the Amazon River. The blue star is Spica in the constellation Virgo, which is also depicted on the Flag of Brazil representing the state. The two red areas symbolize the blood shed by the Cabanos in the Cabanagem revolt.

The star symbolizes the state, which on the national flag corresponds to Espiga, the alpha star of the first magnitude in the constellation Virgo. In the Brazilian pavilion, it is the only star above the banner with the banner "Order and Progress" because, at the time of the proclamation of the Republic, it was the state whose capital, Belém, was the northernmost in the country. Another statement as to why the star is lonely was because the state was the last province to accept Brazil's independence from Portugal.
