= São Félix do Xingu Airport =

São Félix do Xingu Airport Aeroporto de São Félix do Xingu
- IATA: SXX; ICAO: SNFX; LID: PA0013

Summary
- Airport type: Public
- Serves: São Félix do Xingu
- Time zone: BRT (UTC−03:00)
- Elevation AMSL: 183 m (600 ft)
- Coordinates: 06°38′29″S 051°57′08″W

Map
- Location in Brazil SXX (Brazil)

Runways
| Direction | Length | | Surface |
| Direction | m | ft | Surface |
|---|---|---|---|
| 14/32 | 1,600 | 5,249 | Asphalt |
- Sources: ANAC, DECEA

São Félix do Xingu Airport (IATA: SXX, ICAO: SNFX) is the airport serving São Félix do Xingu, Brazil.

== Access ==
The airport is located 3 km (2 mi) from downtown São Félix do Xingu.

== See also ==
- List of airports in Brazil
