= Federal Institute of Pará =

University and school in Brazil

- Instituto Federal do Pará
- Other name: IFPA
- Type: Public university, Vocational school
- Established: September 23, 1909
- Rector: Claudio Alex Jorge da Rocha
- Location: Belém (main campus), Abaetetuba, Altamira, Bragança, Castanhal, Cametá, Capanema, Breves, Tucuruí, and Soure, Pará, Brazil
- Website: Portal IFPA

The Federal Institute of Pará (Portuguese: Instituto Federal do Pará, IFPA) is an institution of higher, vocational, and middle education maintained by the Brazilian federal government in the state of Pará. The institute has students enrolled in its courses offered across its many campuses in the cities of Belém, Abaetetuba, Altamira, Bragança, Castanhal, Cametá, Capanema, Breves, Tucuruí and Soure.
