= Parauapebas =

Municipality in Pará, Brazil

- Municipality
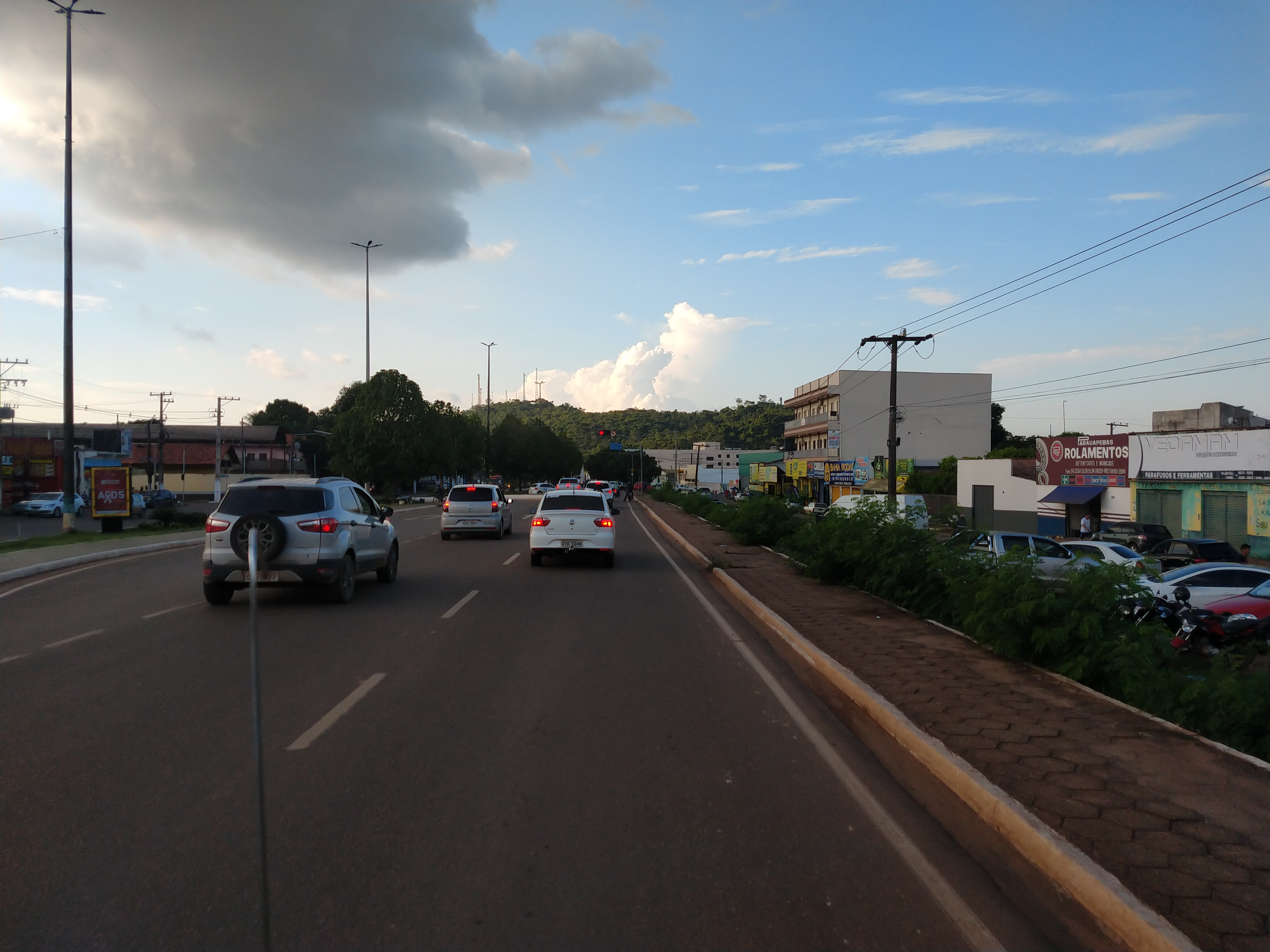

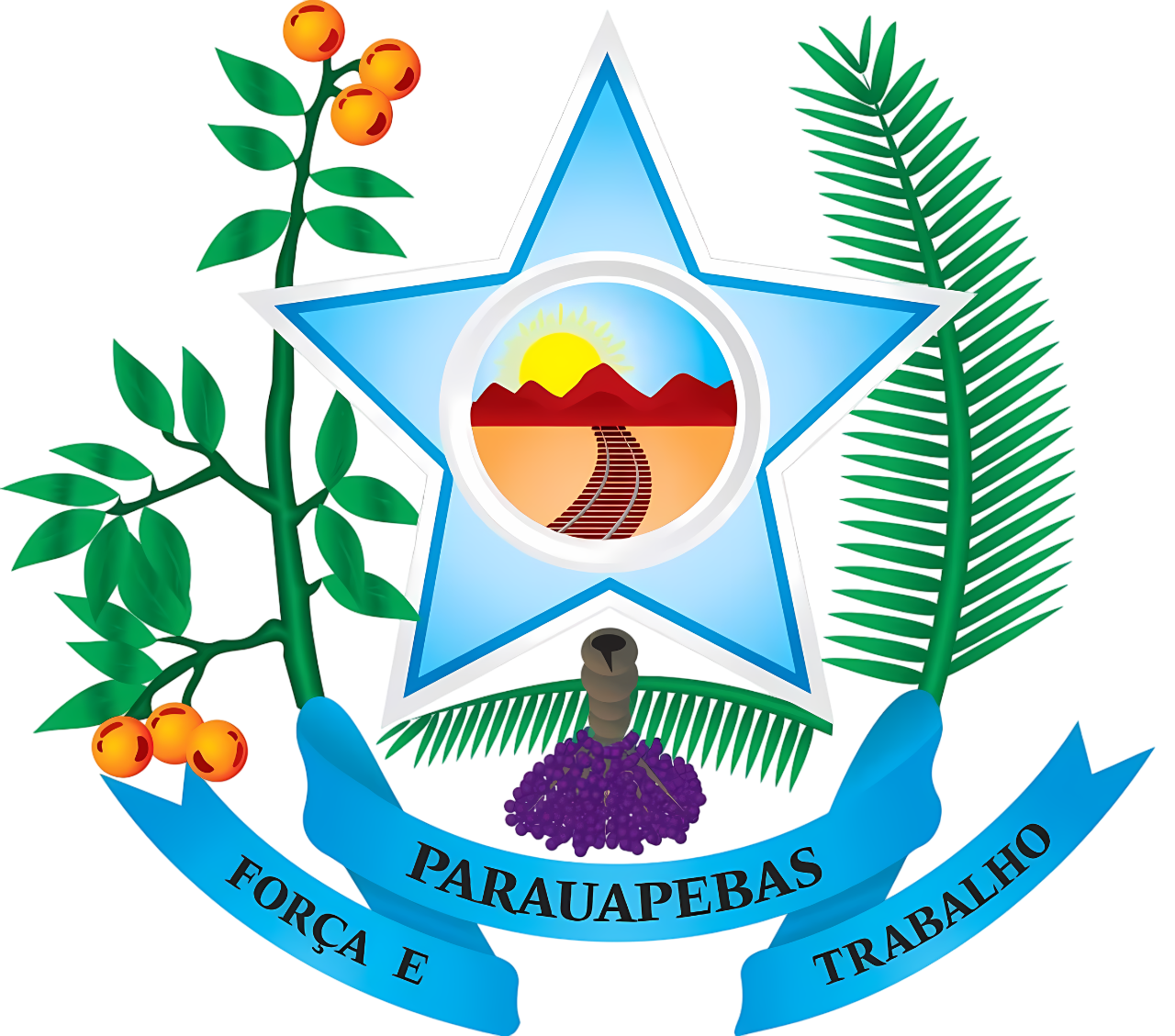
- Flag Coat of arms
- Nicknames: "Pebas" "Cidade dos Paraensses" [Town of the people from Pará] (even though it is in Pará: a town of immigrants)
- Motto(s): Vis et Labore "Força e Trabalho" [Strength and Work]
- Location of Parauapebas in the State of Pará

- Location in Brazil
- Coordinates: 6°4′04″S 49°54′07″W
- Country: Brazil
- Region: Northern
- State: Pará
- Mesoregion: Sudeste Paraense
- Microregion: Parauapebas

Government
  - Mayor: Aurélio Ramos de Oliveira Neto (AVANTE)

Area
  - Total: 2,658.780 sq mi (6,886.208 km^{2})

Population (2022)
  - Total: 267,836
  - Estimate (2025): 305,771
  - Density: 100.736/sq mi (38.8946/km^{2})
- Time zone: UTC−3 (BRT)
- Postal Code (CEP): 68515-000
- Area code: +55 94
- Website: Official website

Parauapebas is a municipality in the state of Pará in the Northern region of Brazil.

== Geography ==
To the north is the municipality of Marabá; to the east, Curionópolis; to the south-east, Canaã dos Carajás; to the south, Água Azul do Norte; to the south-west, Ourilândia do Norte, and to the west, São Félix do Xingu.

The municipality contains part of the Tapirapé-Aquiri National Forest, a 196,504-hectare (485,570-acre) sustainable use conservation unit created in 1989. It contains 68.9% of the Carajás National Forest, a 411,949-hectare (1,017,950-acre) sustainable use conservation unit created in 1998 that includes mining operations in a huge deposit of high-grade iron ore. Carajás Mine is located in the boundaries of the municipality.

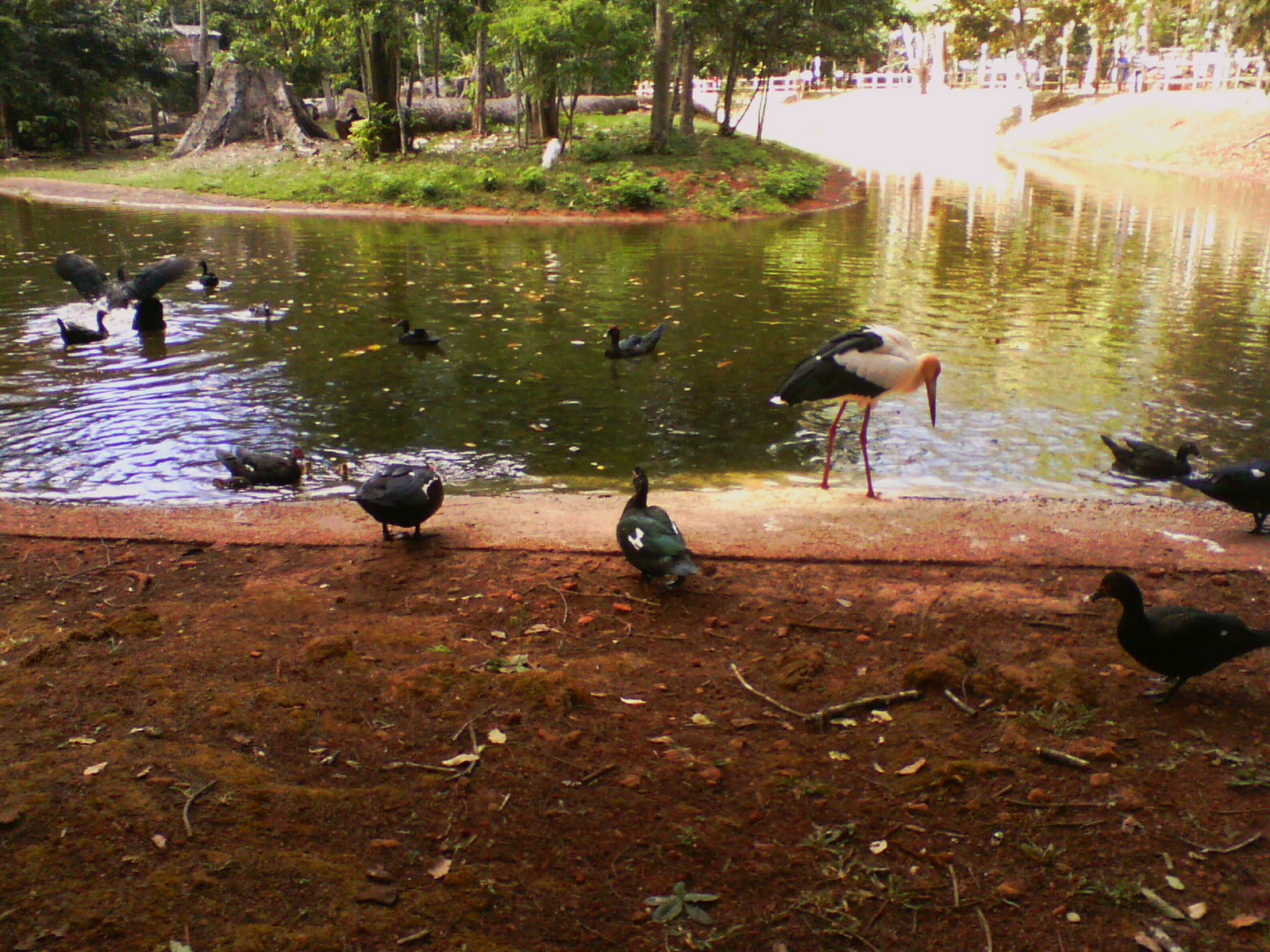
Carajás Zoobotanical Park

== Transport ==
There are direct road connections with Marabá to the north-east, Curionópolis to the east, and Canaã dos Carajás to the south.

One of Brazil's only inter-city rail services (Carajás Railway) is operated by rail freight operator Vale and links São Luís with Parauapebas, which carried 330,000 passengers in 2019.

The municipality is served by Carajás Airport.

== Sport ==
Parauapebas Futebol Clube is the municipality's soccer club.

== See also ==
- List of municipalities in Pará
