= São Félix do Xingu =

- Municipality
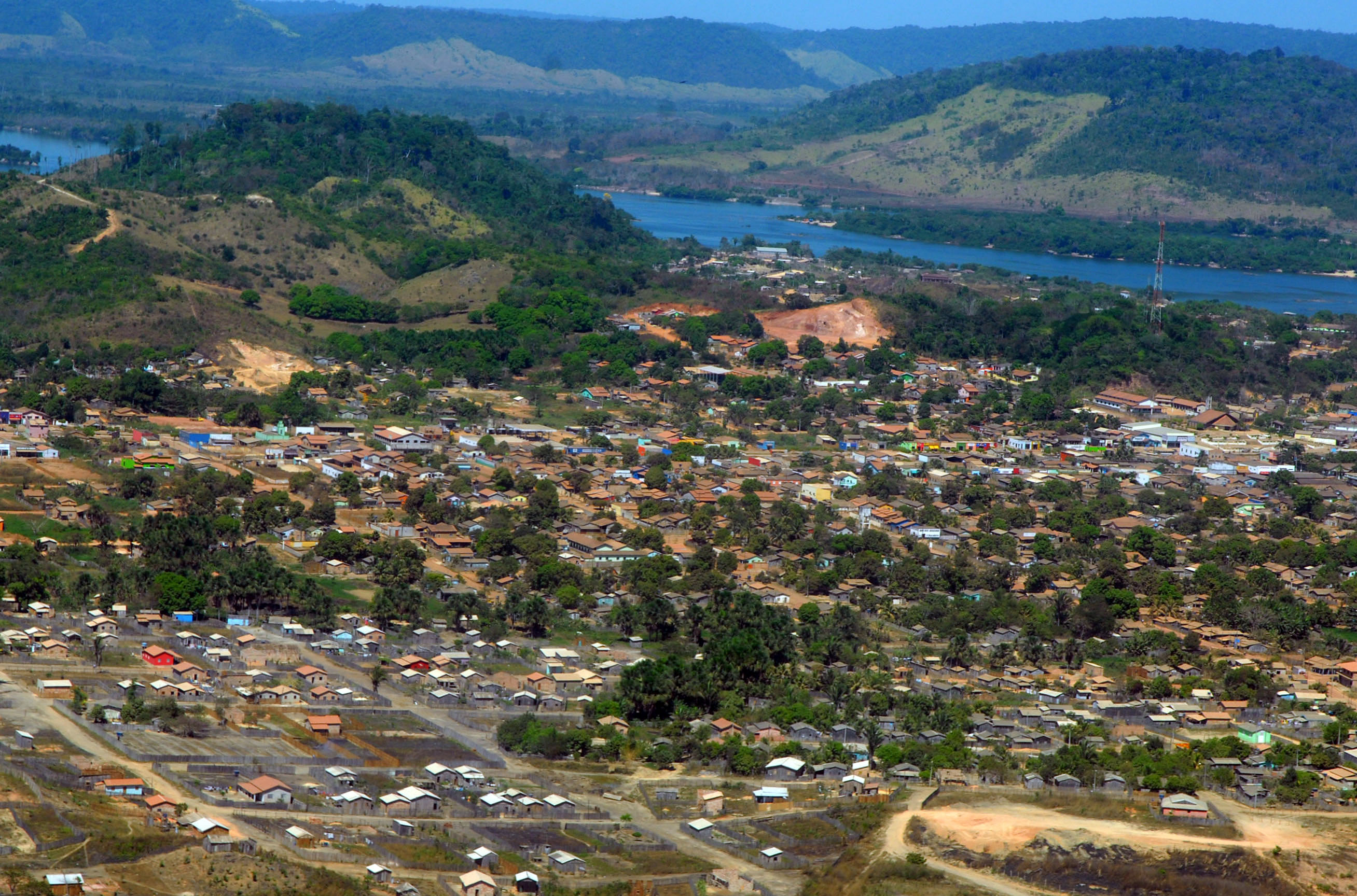

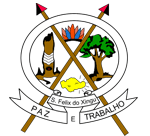
- Flag Coat of arms

- Location of São Félix do Xingu in the State of Pará

- Location in Brazil
- Coordinates: 6°38′00″S 51°59′00″W
- Country: Brazil
- Region: Northern
- State: Pará
- Mesoregion: Sudeste Paraense

Area
  - Total: 32,514.795 sq mi (84,212.932 km^{2})
- Elevation: 720 ft (220 m)

Population (2020)
  - Total: 132,138
  - Density: 4.06393/sq mi (1.56909/km^{2})
- Time zone: UTC−3 (BRT)
- Website: Official website

São Félix do Xingu is a municipality in the state of Pará in the Northern region of Brazil.

The city is served by São Félix do Xingu Airport.

With an area of 84,212.932 km^{2} (32,514.795 sq mi), it is the third largest municipality in Pará and the sixth largest in Brazil.

== Conservation ==
The municipality contains part of the 99,271 hectares (245,300 acres) Tapirapé Biological Reserve, a strictly protected conservation unit created in 1989. It contains part of the Tapirapé-Aquiri National Forest, a 196,504 hectares (485,570 acres) sustainable use conservation unit created in 1989. It also contains part of the 3,373,134 hectares (8,335,200 acres) Terra do Meio Ecological Station, a strictly protected conservation unit created in 2005. The municipality contains 51% of the 445,408 hectares (1,100,630 acres) Serra do Pardo National Park, also created in 2005.

== Climate ==
Climate data for São Félix do Xingu (1981–2010)
Month	Jan	Feb	Mar	Apr	May	Jun	Jul	Aug	Sep	Oct	Nov	Dec	Year
Mean daily maximum °C (°F)	31.0 (87.8)	30.9 (87.6)	31.0 (87.8)	31.6 (88.9)	32.2 (90.0)	32.6 (90.7)	33.5 (92.3)	34.2 (93.6)	33.6 (92.5)	32.7 (90.9)	32.1 (89.8)	31.3 (88.3)	32.2 (90.0)
Daily mean °C (°F)	25.1 (77.2)	25.0 (77.0)	25.2 (77.4)	25.4 (77.7)	25.6 (78.1)	25.3 (77.5)	25.3 (77.5)	25.9 (78.6)	26.1 (79.0)	25.8 (78.4)	25.7 (78.3)	25.1 (77.2)	25.5 (77.9)
Mean daily minimum °C (°F)	20.0 (68.0)	20.0 (68.0)	20.0 (68.0)	20.3 (68.5)	20.1 (68.2)	18.7 (65.7)	17.9 (64.2)	18.6 (65.5)	19.9 (67.8)	20.1 (68.2)	20.3 (68.5)	19.9 (67.8)	19.7 (67.5)
Average precipitation mm (inches)	280.8 (11.06)	295.1 (11.62)	322.6 (12.70)	242.9 (9.56)	109.6 (4.31)	38.1 (1.50)	10.6 (0.42)	48.9 (1.93)	135.3 (5.33)	172.2 (6.78)	169.3 (6.67)	215.8 (8.50)	2,041.2 (80.36)
Average precipitation days (≥ 1.0 mm)	19	19	21	18	10	4	2	4	9	13	13	17	149
Average relative humidity (%)	87.1	86.8	86.9	85.7	84.1	81.5	78.0	77.1	79.7	82.7	84.3	86.4	83.4
Mean monthly sunshine hours	88.6	76.2	82.8	108.4	161.7	187.7	217.1	137.4	129.4	119.5	109.9	88.6	1,507.3
Source: Instituto Nacional de Meteorologia

== See also ==
- List of municipalities in Pará
