= Pará =

State in Brazil

- State
- Flag Coat of arms
- Motto: Sub lege progrediamur (Latin) "Let us progress under the law"
- Anthem: Hino do Pará
- Location in Brazil
- Coordinates: 5°40′S 52°44′W
- Country: Brazil
- Region: North
- Capital and largest city: Belém

Government
  - Type: Unitary state
  - Governor: Hana Ghassan (MDB)
  - Vice governor: Vacant
  - Senators: Beto Faro (PT); Jader Barbalho (MDB); Zequinha Marinho (PODE)
  - Legislature: Legislative Assembly of Pará

Area
  - Total: 1,247,689.5 km^{2} (481,735.6 sq mi)
  - Rank: 2nd
- Highest elevation: 748 m (2,454 ft)

Population (2025)
  - Total: 8,711,196
  - Rank: 9th
  - Density: 6.981862/km^{2} (18.08294/sq mi)
  - Rank: 21st
- Demonym: Paraense

GDP (2024)
  - Total: R$291.128 billion (US$54.023 billion)

HDI
  - Year: 2024
  - Category: 0.758 – high (24th)
- Time zone: UTC−3 (BRT)
- Postal Code: 66000-000 to 68890-000
- ISO 3166 code: BR-PA
- Website: www.pa.gov.br

Pará (/pɑːˈrɑː/, pah-RAH; Brazilian Portuguese: [paˈɾa]) is a state of Brazil, located in northern Brazil and traversed by the lower Amazon River. It borders the Brazilian states of Amapá, Maranhão, Tocantins, Mato Grosso, Amazonas and Roraima. To the northwest are the borders of Guyana and Suriname, and to the northeast is the Atlantic Ocean. The capital and largest city is Belém, which is located at in the bay of Marajó, near the estuary of the Amazon river. The state, which is home to 4.1% of the Brazilian population, is responsible for 2.2% of the Brazilian GDP.

Pará is the most populous state of the North Region, with a population of over 8.6 million, being the ninth-most populous state in Brazil. It is the second-largest state of Brazil in area, at 1.2 million square kilometres (460,000 sq mi), second only to Amazonas upriver. Its most famous icons are the Amazon River and the Amazon rainforest. Pará produces rubber (extracted from rubber tree groves), cassava, açaí, pineapple, cocoa, black pepper, coconut, banana, tropical hardwoods such as mahogany, and minerals such as iron ore and bauxite. A new commodity crop is soy, cultivated in the region of Santarém.

Every October, Belém receives tens of thousands of tourists for the year's most important religious celebration: the procession of the Círio de Nazaré. Another important attraction of the capital is the Marajó-style ceramics, based on the vanished Marajoara culture, which developed on that very large island in the Amazon River.

== Etymology ==
The state's name is a toponym of the Tupi word pará – literally "sea", but sometimes used to refer to large rivers. The state was named after the river of the same name, the Pará River, one of the tributaries of the Amazon River.

== History ==
In 1500, the Spanish navigator Vicente Yáñez Pinzón was the first European to navigate the mouth of the Amazon River. On 26 August 1542, the Spaniard Francisco de Orellana reached the mouth of the Amazon River waterway, by river from Quito, Ecuador. On 28 October 1637, the Portuguese Pedro Teixeira left Belém and went to Quito: during the expedition, he placed a landmark in the confluence of the Napo and Aguarico, in the current border between Ecuador and Peru, to Portugal, and later to Brazil, getting the possession of most of the Amazon, including all of the current territory of Pará.

=== Prior to European Arrival ===
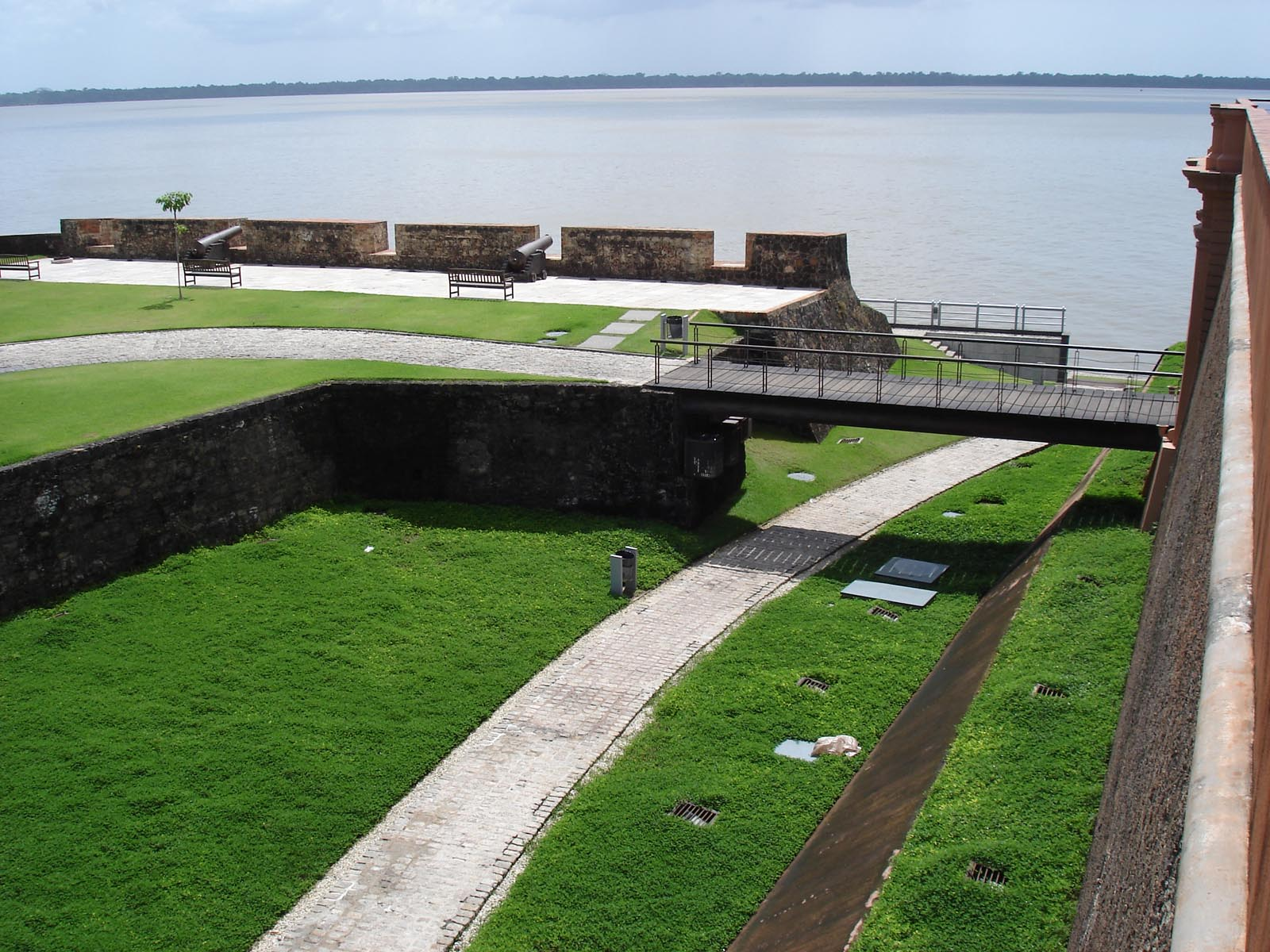
Fort of the Nativity (Forte do Presépio), in Belém city, Brazil.

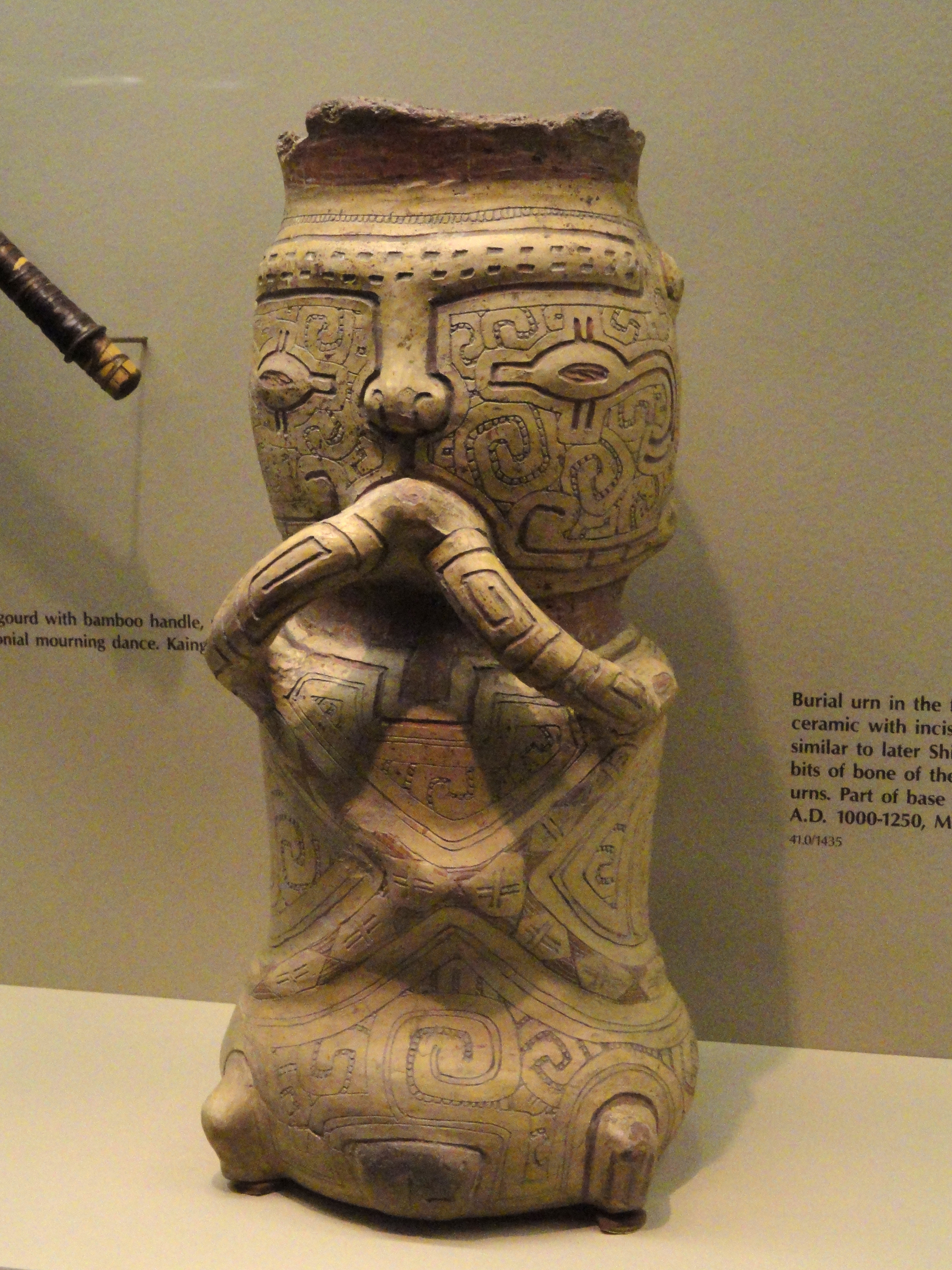
Marajoara funerary urn (1000-1250)

Archaeologists divide the ancient inhabitants of prehistory Brazil into groups according to their way of life and tools: hunter-gatherers of the coast and farmers. These groups were subsequently named by European settlers as "Indians". There are archaeological records proving the human presence in Brazil and the region of Santarém since 3000 BC.

Marajó people lived in farmers' huts or houses 3,500 years ago. These people knew ceramics, dyes, natural medicinal compounds; practiced slash-and-burn (to clear the land); and planted cassava. A reminder of their culture remains in Marajoara pottery, which has peculiar size and decoration. The period from 500 to 1300 was the height of the Marajoara culture.

=== Formation of Grão-Pará and Maranhão ===
The region of the Amazon valley, by the Treaty of Tordesillas (1494), was in possession of the Spanish Crown, the Portuguese expeditionaries, with the purpose of consolidating the region as Portuguese territory, founded the Fort of the Nativity (Forte do Presépio) in 1616, in Santa Maria de Belém do Grão-Pará (Saint Mary of Bethlehem of the Great Pará). The building was the first of the model on Amazon and the most significant in the Amazon territory until 1660. Despite the construction of fort, the occupation of territory was marked by early Dutch and English incursions in search of spices, hence the need of the Portuguese to fortify the area.

In the 17th century, the region, integrated into the captaincy of Maranhão, was prosperous with crops and livestock. In 1616 the captaincy of Grão-Pará was created, belonging to the Portuguese colonial state of Maranhão. In the same year the state of Grão-Pará and Maranhão transferred capital to Belém, forming and attaching the captaincy of Rio Negro in 1755 by creating the State of Grão-Pará and Rio Negro.

In 1751, with the expansion to the west, the colonial state of Grão-Pará, which besides the captaincy of Grão Pará would host the captaincy of São José do Rio Negro (today the State of Amazonas).

In 1823, the Pará decided to join the independent Brazil, which had been separated during the colonial period, reporting directly to Lisbon. However, political infighting continued. The most important of them, the Cabanagem (1835), decreed the independence of the province of Pará. This was, along with the Ragamuffin War, the only to lift the regency period when the power was taken. Cabanagem was the only revolt led by the popular strata.

=== Cabanagem ===
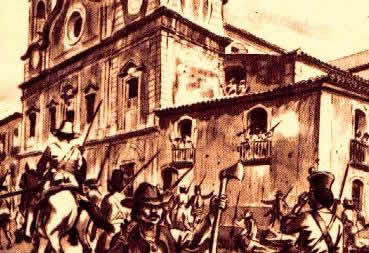
19th century engraving about the Cabanagem

Cabanagem, a popular and social revolt during the Empire of Brazil, in the Amazon region, was influenced by the French Revolution. It was mainly due to extreme poverty, hunger and disease that devastated the Amazon at the beginning of the period, in the former province of Grão-Pará, which included the current Amazonian states of Pará, Amazonas, Amapá, Roraima and Rondônia. The revolt spread from 1835 until January 1840, due to the process of independence of Brazil (1822), which did not occur immediately in the province due to political irrelevance to which the region was relegated by Prince Regent Pedro I. After independence, the strong Portuguese influence remained stable, giving political irrelevance in this province to the Brazilian central government.

Indians, blacks, and mestizos (mostly poor class members), all named cabanos (cabins), teamed against the Regent Government and rebelled, to increase the importance of the region in Brazil's central government addressing the issue of poverty as one of the reasons. All lived in mud huts (hence the name of the revolt). At the bottom of the rebellion, there was a mobilization of the Brazilian Empire against the reactionary forces of the province of Grão-Pará in expelling the insurgents who wanted to keep the region as a Portuguese colony or territory independent. Many of the local leaders, who resented the lack of political participation in decisions of the centralizer of the Brazil government, contributed to the climate of dissatisfaction against the provincial government.

=== Rubber cycle and mineral extraction ===
After the revolt, the local economy grew rapidly during the 19th century and early 20th century by exploitation of rubber, the latex, by extracting it. At this period the Amazon experienced two distinct economic cycles with the exploitation of the same raw material.

The intendant Antônio Lemos was the main character of the urban transformation that Belém experienced, which came to be known as Paris n'America (Paris in America), as a reference to the influence of the urbanization that Paris had experienced at the time, which served as the inspiration for Antônio Lemos.

During this period, for example, the city center was heavily lined with mango trees transported from India and development inspired by the model of Paris. With the decline of the two cycles of rubber (1870–1920 and 1940–1945), came a distressing economic stagnation, which stopped in the 1960s and 1970s, with the development of agricultural activities in the south of the state. From the decade of 1960s, but mainly in the 1970s, growth was accelerating with the exploitation of minerals mainly in the southeastern region of the state, as with iron extraction in the Serra dos Carajás and the Serra Pelada gold.

== Geography ==
=== Climate ===
Köppen climate types of Pará.

All of Pará has a tropical climate, with most areas having a tropical monsoon climate (Köppen Am) with a drier season from July to November. The driest months are usually September and October with around 30 millimetres or 1.2 inches, whilst February to April are the wettest with between 350 and 450 millimetres (14 and 18 inches). In the extreme south and east this grades into a tropical savanna climate (Aw) with less rainfall and a more pronounced dry season in the middle of the year, whilst parts of the north have a tropical rainforest climate (Köppen Af) with over 60 millimetres or 2.4 inches in all months and an annual total of around 2,500 millimetres or 100 inches.

Temperatures throughout Pará are uniformly hot with high relative humidity. Maxima are typically between 30 and 34 °C or 86.0 and 93.2 °F, and minima around 22 °C or 71.6 °F year-round.

=== Vegetation ===
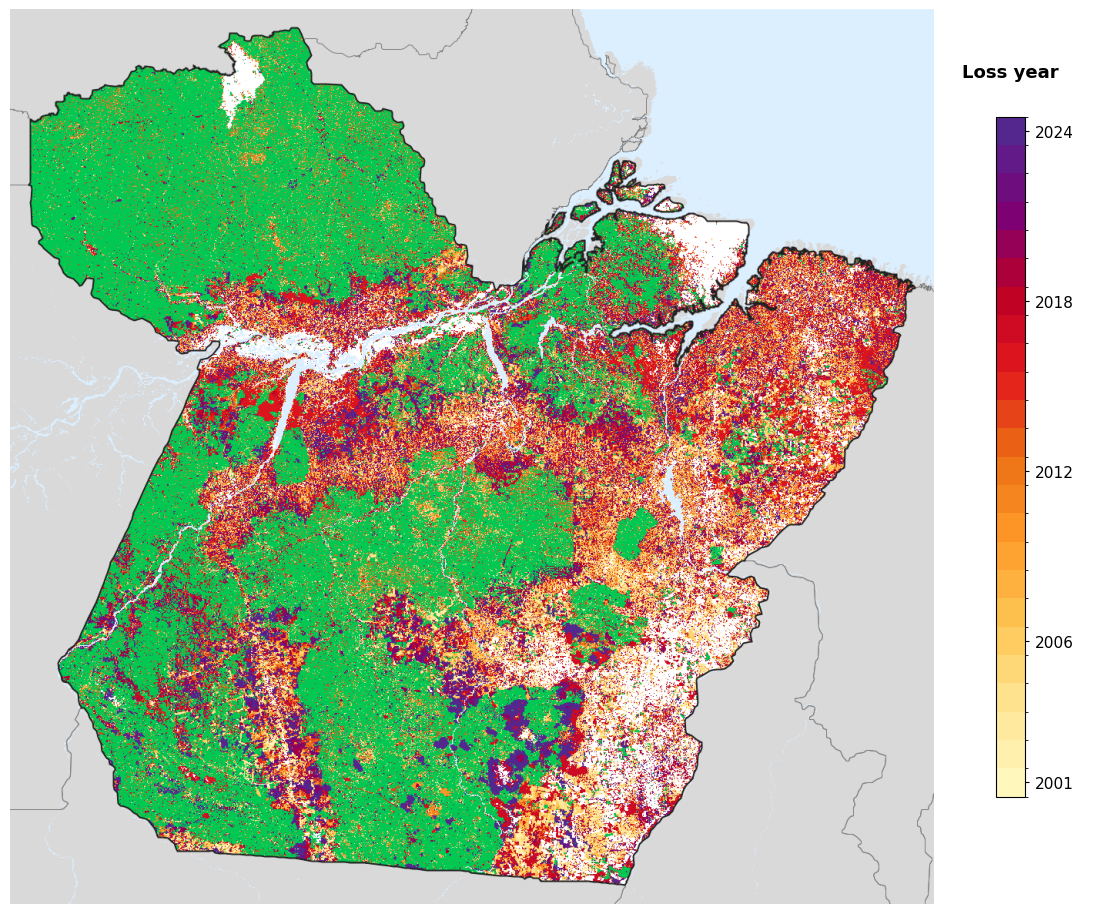
Tree-cover loss year in Pará, 2001-2024, from the Global Forest Change dataset.

The Amazon represents over half of the planet's remaining rainforests and comprises the largest and most species-rich tracts of tropical rainforest in the world. Wet tropical forests are the most species-rich biome, and tropical forests in the Americas are consistently more species rich than the wet forests in Africa and Asia. As the largest tract of tropical rainforest in the Americas, the Amazonian rainforests have unparalleled biodiversity. More than one-third of all species in the world live in the Amazon rainforest The largest biodiversity of the planet is present across the state of Pará.

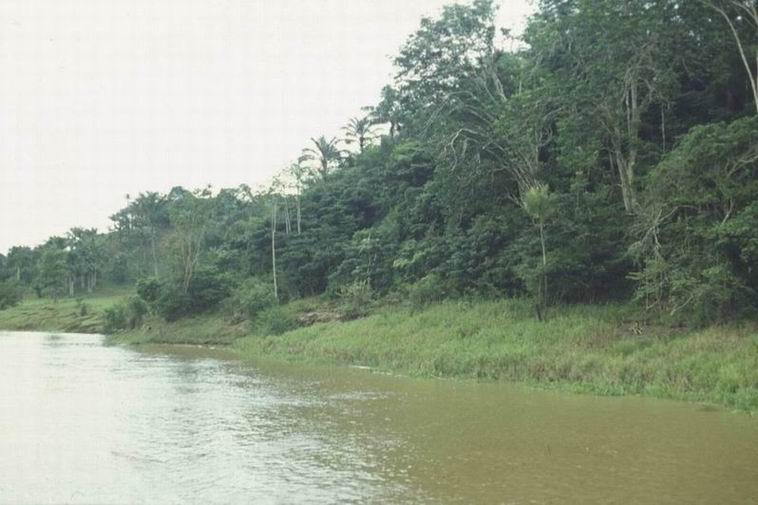
Amazon River in the Amazon rainforest

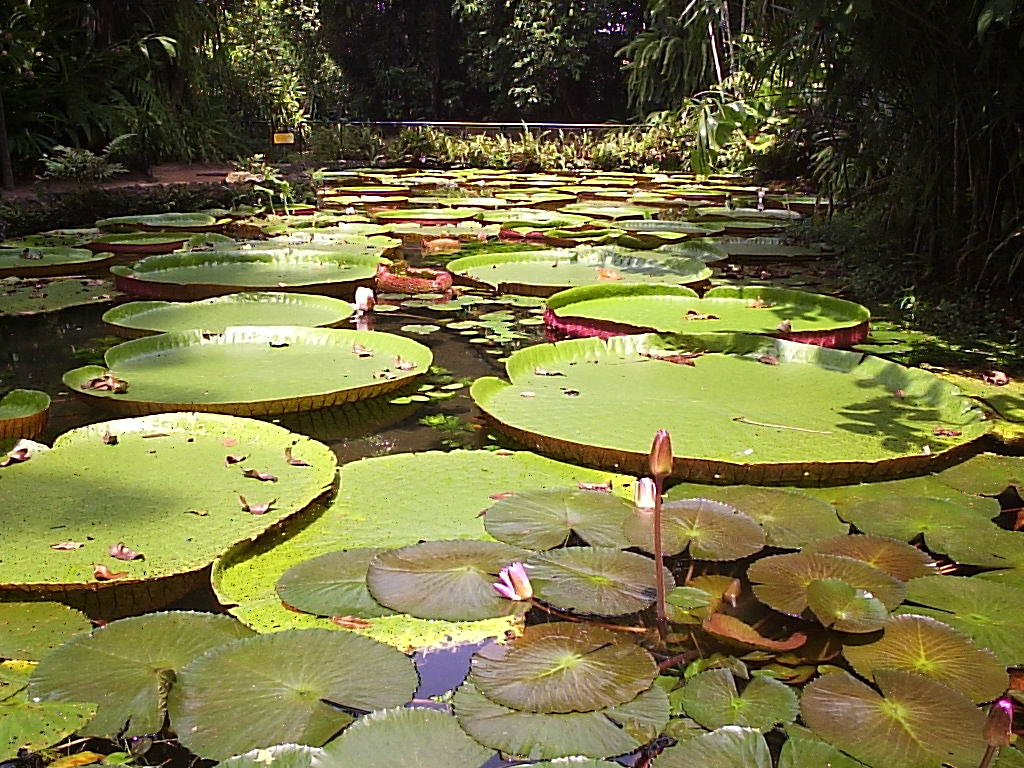
Vitória Régia, in the Paraense Emílio Goeldi Museum in Belém

== Political subdivisions ==
The state is divided into 144 municipalities.

The largest cities by population (2016) are:

- Belém 1,446,042
- Ananindeua 510,834
- Santarém 294,447
- Marabá 272,172
- Parauapebas 196,259
- Castanhal 192,571
- Abaetetuba 151,934
- Cametá 132,515
- Marituba 125,435
- Bragança 122,881
- Tucuruí 122,580
- Barcarena 121,074
- Altamira 111,938
- Paragominas 108,547
- Itaituba 98,485

== Demographics ==
Historical population
Year	Pop.	±%
1872	275,237	—
1890	328,455	+19.3%
1900	445,356	+35.6%
1920	983,507	+120.8%
1940	944,644	−4.0%
1950	1,123,273	+18.9%
1960	1,550,935	+38.1%
1970	2,197,072	+41.7%
1980	3,507,312	+59.6%
1991	5,181,570	+47.7%
2000	6,195,965	+19.6%
2010	7,581,051	+22.4%
2022	8,120,131	+7.1%

According to the IBGE of 2022, there were 8,120,131 people residing in the state. The population density was 6.52 inhabitants per square kilometre (16.9/sq mi). Urbanization: 75.2% (2006); Population growth: 2.5% (1991–2000); Houses: 1,754,000 (2006).

The last PNAD (National Research for Sample of Domiciles) census revealed the following numbers: 5,673,446 Brown (Multiracial) people (69.9%), 1,570,281 White people (19.3%), 793,621 Black people (9.8%), 69,180 Amerindian people (0.9%), 12,432 Asian people (0.2%).

=== Ethnic groups ===
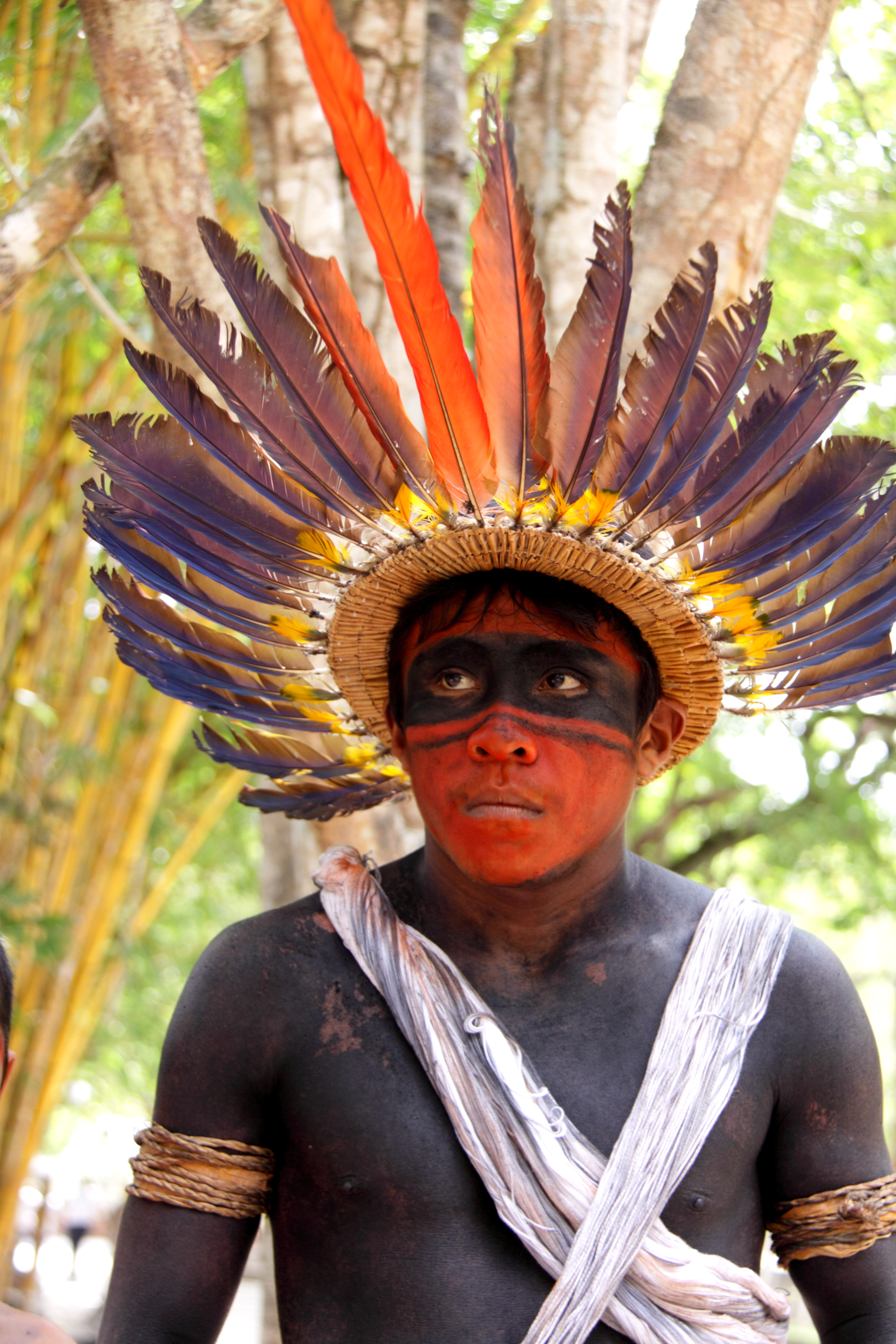
Assurini Indians lived in isolation until 1971.

Pará has attracted numerous Portuguese, Spanish, and Japanese immigrants. They have told their stories in a permanent space, the "Room Vicente Salles" of the "Memorial of the People", in Belém. The Portuguese colonists were followed by Spaniards fleeing wars and social unrest due to political disputes in the Iberian Peninsula. The Japanese have become established in agrarian communities, settling in towns such as Tomé-Açu.

Portuguese explorers and missionaries settled in the state in the 17th century. In January 1616, the Portuguese captain, Francisco Caldeira Castelo Branco began the occupation of the land, founding the Fort of the Nativity, nucleus of the future state capital. Portuguese religious missions were used to establish settlements between here and the Fort St. Louis of Maranhão. Most settlers sailed up the Amazon River as travel overland was extremely arduous. The Portuguese were the first to arrive in Pará, leaving contributions ranging from cuisine to architecture.

The first Japanese immigrants who settled in the Amazon left the Port of Kobe in Japan, on July 24, 1926, and reached the city of Tomé-Açu, on 22 September of that year, with stops in Rio de Janeiro and Belém.

The Japanese introduced crops such as jute and black pepper in the 1930s; jute was so successful that it drove a boom in the regional economy. In the 1970s, Japanese farmers introduced cultivation of Hawaiian papaya and melon, for which there is international demand. The third largest ethnic Japanese community in Brazil is in Pará, with about 13,000 inhabitants (surpassed only by settlements in the states of São Paulo and Paraná). They live mainly in the cities of Tomé-Açu, Santa Izabel do Pará, and Castanhal.

Italian immigrants in Pará came predominantly from the south of Italy, originating in Calabria, Campania and Basilicata. It was a time of a wave of emigration. They were all settlers and devoted to trade. The first Italian trade was recorded in 1888 in Santarém. The immigrants planted family roots in Belém, Breves, Abaetetuba, Óbidos, Oriximiná, Santarém and Alenquer. The presence in western Pará was so pronounced that the Consulate of Italy established an office in Óbidos, which is the largest city populated by Italians in the state. The consulate was in Recife, Pernambuco.

In Belém, the Italians worked in commercial and retail services. They were important during the beginning of the industrialization of the state capital (1895). According to the 1920 census, about 1,000 Italians lived in Pará. At the end of World War II, another wave of Italian immigrants arrived after the persecution of Japanese, Italians, and Germans. Similar to French immigrants, this wave of Italians did not remain in Pará.

Lebanese immigrants arrived in Pará in the mid-19th century, at the time of the rubber boom, and through 1914. There were between 15,000 and 25,000 Syrian-Lebanese immigrants, of whom one-third went to Acre. In Pará, the Lebanese settled in Belém, and in the cities of Cametá, Marabá, Altamira, Breves, Monte Alegre, Alenquer, Santarém, Óbidos, Soure, Maracanã, Abaetetuba, among others.

The first French immigrants arrived in Brazil in the second half of the 19th century, settling in the colony of Benevides, the metropolitan region of Belém do Pará. The French were attracted to the region because of the rubber boom, eventually settling in Belém, which became known as Paris N'América.

=== Largest cities ===
Largest cities or towns in Pará (2011 census by the Brazilian Institute of Geography and Statistics)
Rank		Mesoregion	Pop.	Rank		Mesoregion	Pop.
1	Belém	Metropolitana	1,437,600	11	Marituba	Metropolitana	101,158
2	Ananindeua	Metropolitana	505,512	12	Breves	Marajó	101,094
3	Santarém	Baixo Amazonas	276,665	13	Altamira	Sudoeste	98,750
4	Marabá	Sudeste	203,049	14	Paragominas	Sudeste	97,350
5	Castanhal	Metropolitana	161,497	15	Tucuruí	Sudeste	96,010
6	Parauapebas	Sudeste	152,777	16	Barcarena	Metropolitana	92,567
7	Abaetetuba	Nordeste	139,819	17	Redenção	Sudeste	75,583
8	Itaituba	Sudoeste	127,848	18	Tailândia	Nordeste	72,720
9	Cametá	Nordeste	117,099	19	Moju	Nordeste	68,600
10	Bragança	Nordeste	107,060	20	São Félix do Xingu	Nordeste	67,208

=== Education ===
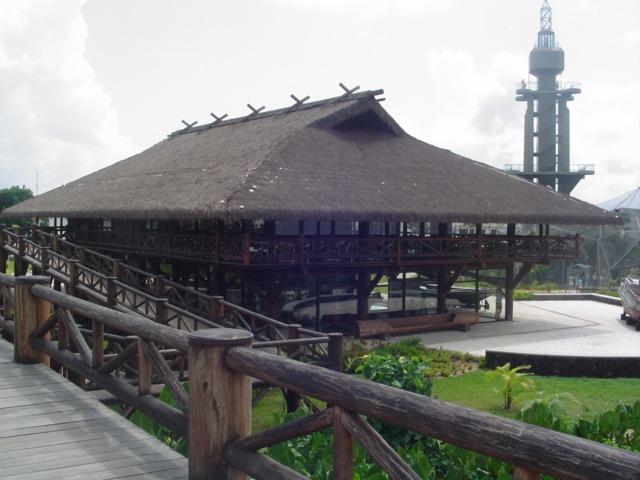
Belém is the most important education centre of the state.

Portuguese is the official national language, and thus the primary language taught in schools. English and Spanish are part of the official high school curriculum.

==== Educational institutions ====
- Universidade Federal do Pará (UFPA) (Federal University of Pará);
- Universidade Federal do Oeste do Pará (UFOPA) (Federal University of Western Pará);
- Universidade Federal do Sul e Sudeste do Pará (UNIFESSPA) (Federal University of Southern and Southeastern Pará)
- Universidade Federal Rural da Amazonia (UFRA) (Federal Rural University of Amazonia);
- Universidade do Estado do Pará (UEPA) (Pará State University);
- Universidade da Amazônia (UNAMA) (University of Amazon);
- Instituto Federal do Pará (IFPA) (Federal Institute of Pará);
- Centro Universitário do Pará (CESUPA) (University Center of Pará);

== Economy ==
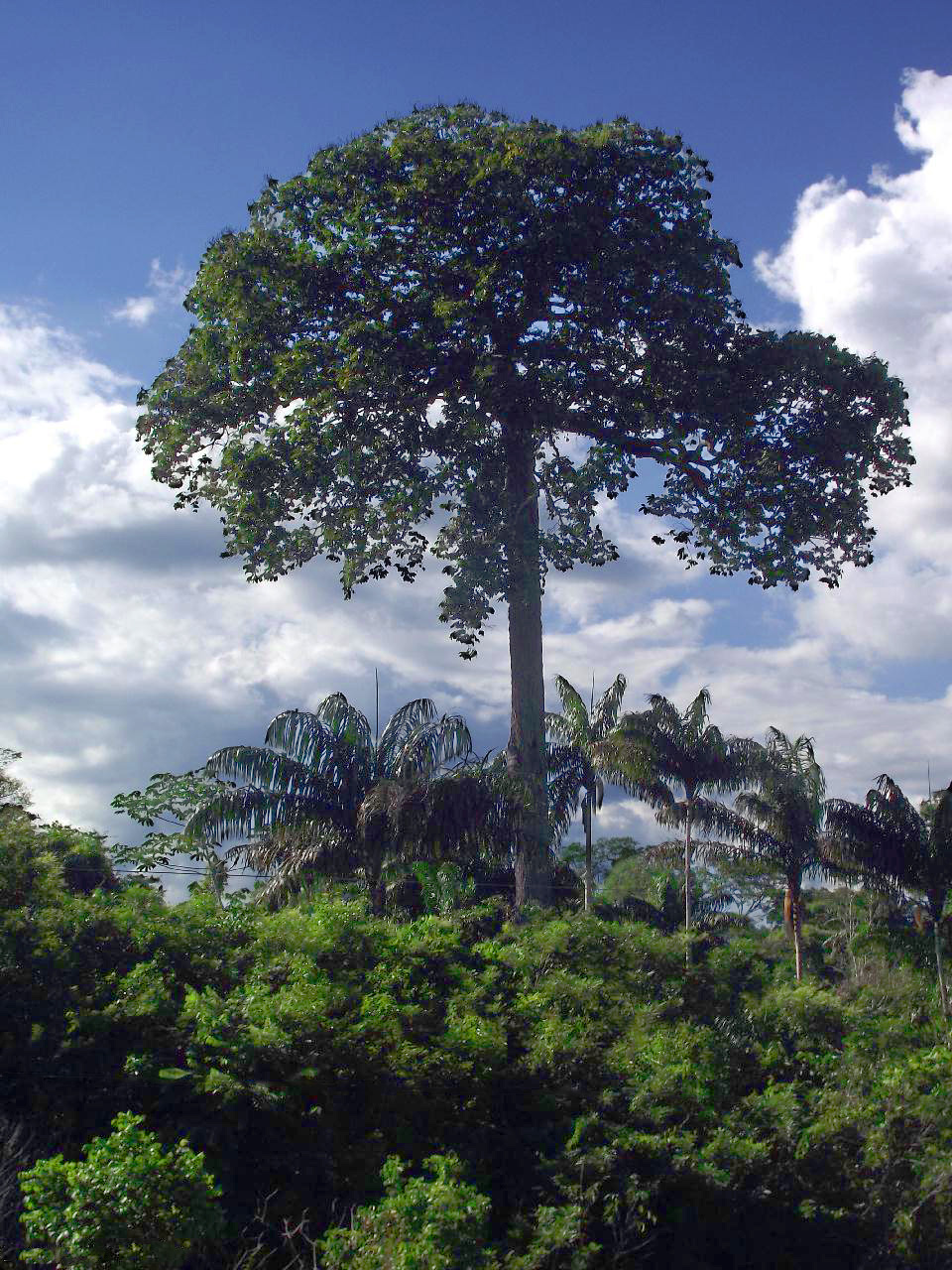
Brazil nut tree in Pará.

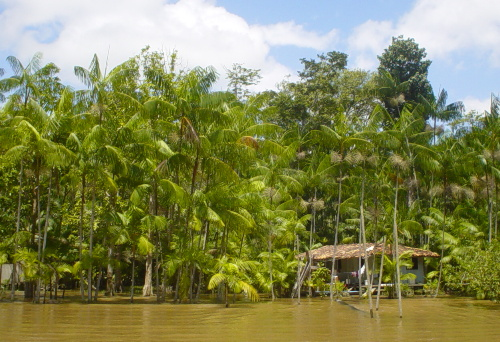
Acai trees in Pará.

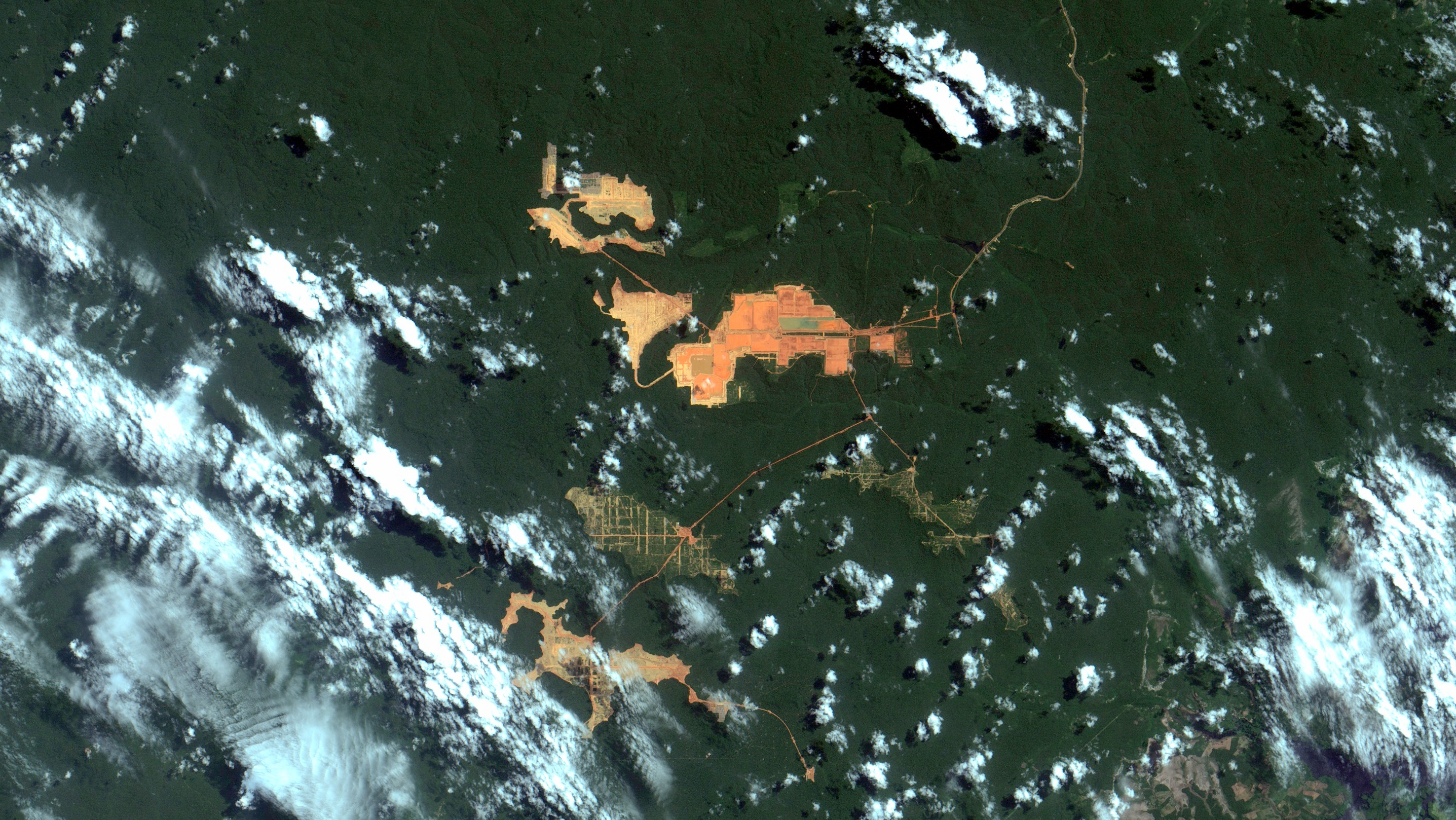
Extraction of bauxite in Pará

The service sector is the largest component of GDP at 40.9%, followed by the industrial sector at 36.3%. Agriculture represents 22.8% of GDP (2004). Pará exports iron ore 31.1%, aluminium 22.2%, wood 13.5%, ores of aluminium 8.3%, others ores 7.9% (2002), representing 1.8% of the Brazilian economy (2005).

The mining sector represents 14% of the gross domestic product (GDP) of the state, originated mainly from the extraction of iron, bauxite, manganese, limestone and tin, as well as gold, until recently extracted from one of the largest mines of recent history: Serra Pelada. The economy of Pará is based also on the extraction of vegetation, on agriculture and cattle raising. Thanks to the rich soil and the important hydrographic basin – boats are the main means of transport in the region. Guaraná, a tree from which a powder is produced and used as a stimulant, and annatto seeds, a fruit used for cooking, as a sunscreen and for dye extraction. Marajó – the biggest fluvial-maritime island in the world, with an area of 50,000 km^{2} (19,000 sq mi). Its territory has one of the largest mining areas in the country, in the Carajás Mountains, a mining province where the Ferro Carajás Project is based, from Companhia Vale do Rio Doce. The complex produced 296 million metric tons of iron ore in 2007, exporting the product to many countries, among them Japan, Germany, Italy, France and Spain.

Pará is the largest producer of cassava, açaí, pineapple and cocoa of Brazil and is among the largest in Brazil in the production of black pepper (2nd place), coconut (3rd place) and banana (6th place).

In cassava production, Brazil produced a total of 17.6 million tons in 2018. Pará was the largest producer in the country, with 3.8 million tons.

In 2019, Pará produced 95% of açaí in Brazil. The state traded more than 1.2 million tons of the fruit, worth more than US$1.5 billion, about 3% of the state's GDP.

In 2018, Pará was the largest Brazilian producer of pineapple, with 426 million fruits harvested on almost 19 thousand hectares. In 2017, Brazil was the 3rd largest producer in the world (close to 1.5 billion fruits harvested on approximately 60 thousand hectares). It is the fifth most cultivated fruit in the country. The southeast of Pará has 85% of the state production: the cities of Floresta do Araguaia (76.45%), Conceição do Araguaia (8.42%) and Salvaterra (3.12%) led the ranking this year. Floresta do Araguaia also has the largest concentrated fruit juice industry in Brazil, exporting to European Union, United States and Mercosur.

Pará is also one of the largest Brazilian producers of coconut. In 2019, it was the 3rd largest producer in the country, with 191.8 million fruits harvested, second only to Bahia and Ceará.

Pará is the 2nd largest Brazilian producer of black pepper, with 34 thousand tons harvested in 2018.

The Brazil nut has always been one of the main products of extraction in Northern Brazil, with collection on the forest floor. However, in recent decades, the commercial cultivation of Brazil nut was created. There are already properties with more than 1 million chestnut trees for large-scale production. The annual production averages in Brazil varied between 20 thousand and 40 thousand tons per year in 2016.

In the production of cocoa, Pará has been competing with Bahia for the leadership of Brazilian production. In 2017 Pará obtained the leadership for the first time. In 2019, people from Pará harvested 135 thousand tons of cocoa, and Bahians harvested 130 thousand tons. Bahia's cocoa area is practically three times larger than that of Pará, but Pará's productivity is practically three times greater. Some factors that explain this are: the crops in Bahia are more extractivist, and those in Pará have a more modern and commercial style, in addition to paraenses using more productive and resistant seeds, and their region providing resistance to Witch's broom.

In 2018, Pará occupied the 6th national position in the banana production.

In 2018, Pará had the 5th largest cattle herd in Brazil, with 20.6 million head of cattle. The city of São Félix do Xingu is the largest in the country, with 2.2 million animals. Marabá is the 6th largest city in the country in numbers, with 1 million animals. In the ranking of the 20 main herds, Pará has seven names. Part of this is due to the fact that the municipalities of Pará have gigantic territory.

In 2017, in the iron ore sector, Pará was the 2nd largest national producer, with 169 million tons (of the 450 million produced by the country), at a value of R$25.5 billion. In copper, Pará produced almost 980 thousand tons (of the 1.28 million tons in Brazil), at a value of R$6.5 billion. In aluminum (bauxite), Pará carried out almost all Brazilian production (34.5 of 36.7 million tons) at a value of R$3 billion. In manganese, Pará produced a large part of Brazilian production (2.3 of 3.4 million tons) at a value of R$1 billion. In gold, Pará was the 3rd largest Brazilian producer, with 20 tons at a value of R$940 million. In nickel, Goiás and Pará are the only two producers in the country, with Pará being the 2nd in production, having obtained 90 thousand tons at a value of R$750 million. In tin, Pará the 3rd largest producer (4.4 thousand tons, at a value of R$114 million). Pará had 42.93% of the value of commercialized mineral production in Brazil, with almost R$38 billion.

Due to the proximity of the iron ore mines, Siderúrgica Norte Brasil (Sinobras) was created in Marabá. In 2018, the company produced 345 thousand tons of crude steel, of the 35.4 million produced in the country.

Pará had in 2017 an industrial GDP of R$43.8 billion, equivalent to 3.7% of the national industry. It employs 164,989 workers in the industry. The main industrial sectors are: Extraction of metallic minerals (46,9%), Industrial Public Utility Services, such as Electricity and Water (23.4%), Construction (14.8%), Metallurgy (4.3%) and Food (4.3%). These 5 sectors concentrate 93.7% of the state's industry.

== Infrastructure ==
=== Airports ===
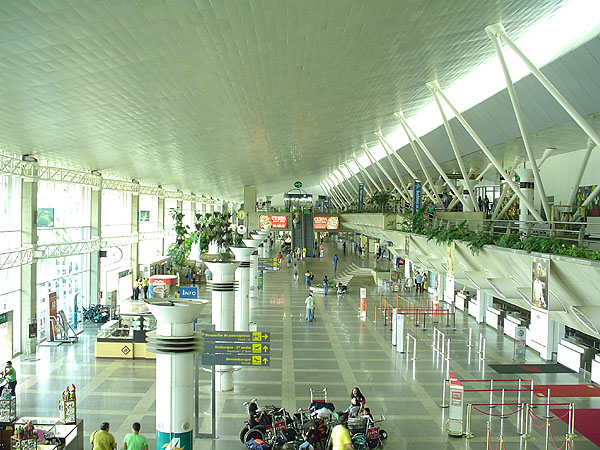
Belém International Airport

Belém International Airport (BEL) is 10 km from the center of Belém. Currently it serves demand of 2.7 million passengers a year, in a constructed area of 33,255.17 square meters (357,955.7 sq ft). Traditionally called Val-de-Cães Airport, the airport was considered one of the 10 best in the world according to a survey carried out in 2023.

=== Port ===
The Port of Belém has restaurants, art galleries, a small brewery, ice-cream shops, artisan stands, regional food kiosks, coffee houses, a space for fairs and events, a theatre for 400 spectators, and a touristic harbour.

== Sports ==
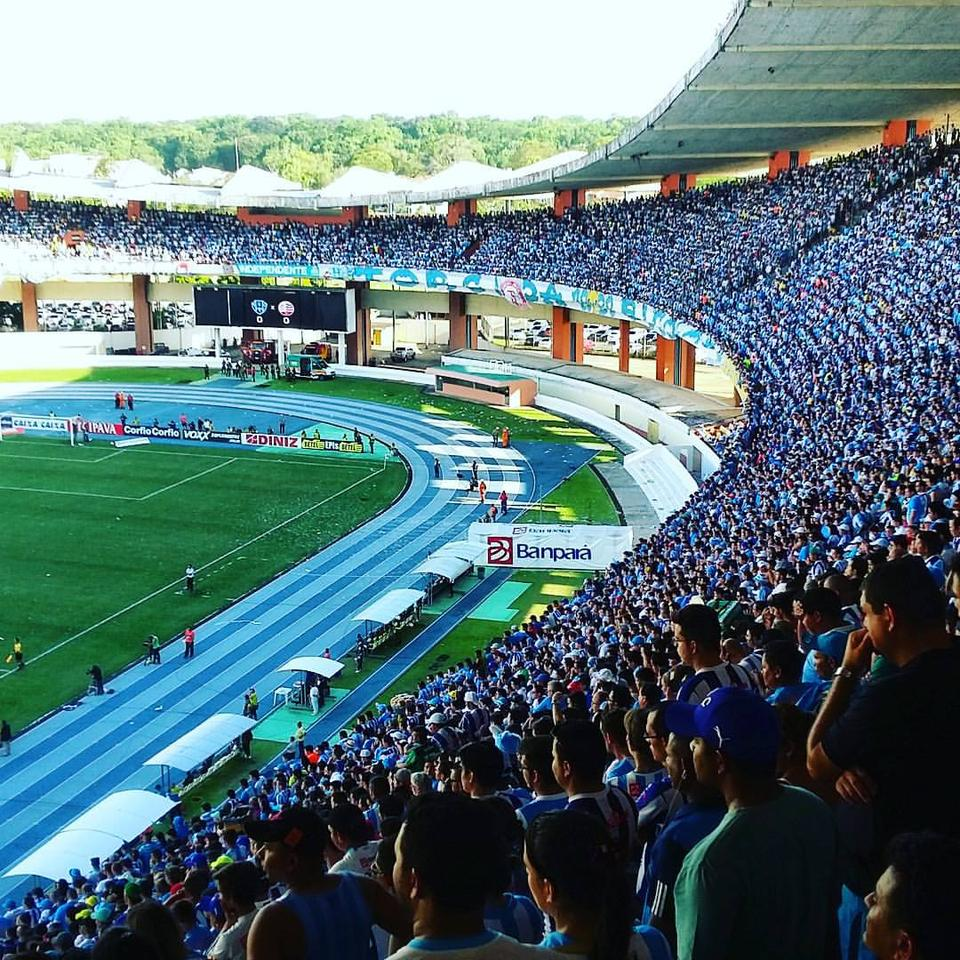
Estádio Olímpico do Pará in Belém.

Belém provides visitors and residents with sport activities.

The Mangueirão stadium architectural project is from August 1969. In 2002, 24 years after its inauguration, Mangueirão was reinaugurated as an Olympic stadium of Pará. The visiting capacity of the stadium is at around 50,000.

== Flag ==
The white stripe in the Flag of Pará represents the zodiac, the Equator and the Amazon River. The blue star is Spica in the constellation Virgo, which is also depicted on the Flag of Brazil representing the state. The two red areas symbolize the blood shed by the Cabanos in the Cabanagem revolt.

== In popular culture ==
Pará is mentioned in season 4, episode 6 of American television show House. House is brought in to consult with the CIA about a patient. His final diagnosis is selenium poisoning from eating "castanhas-do-Pará," literally "nuts from Pará" in Brazilian Portuguese, aka Brazil nuts.

== See also ==
- History of Belém
- Hélio Gracie – martial artist.
- Guilherme Paraense — Olympic medalist.
- Rogério Ferreira – beach volleyball player, World Champion.
