= BR-010 (Brazil highway) =

Highway in Brazil

BR-010
- Rodovia Engenheiro Bernardo Sayão
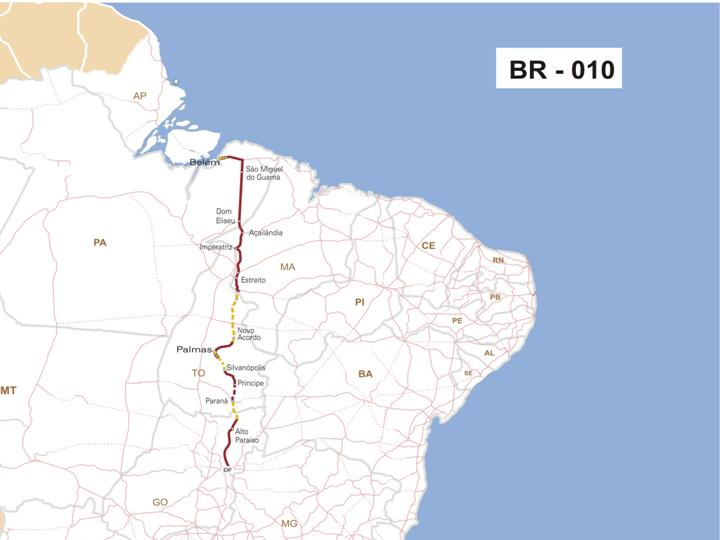

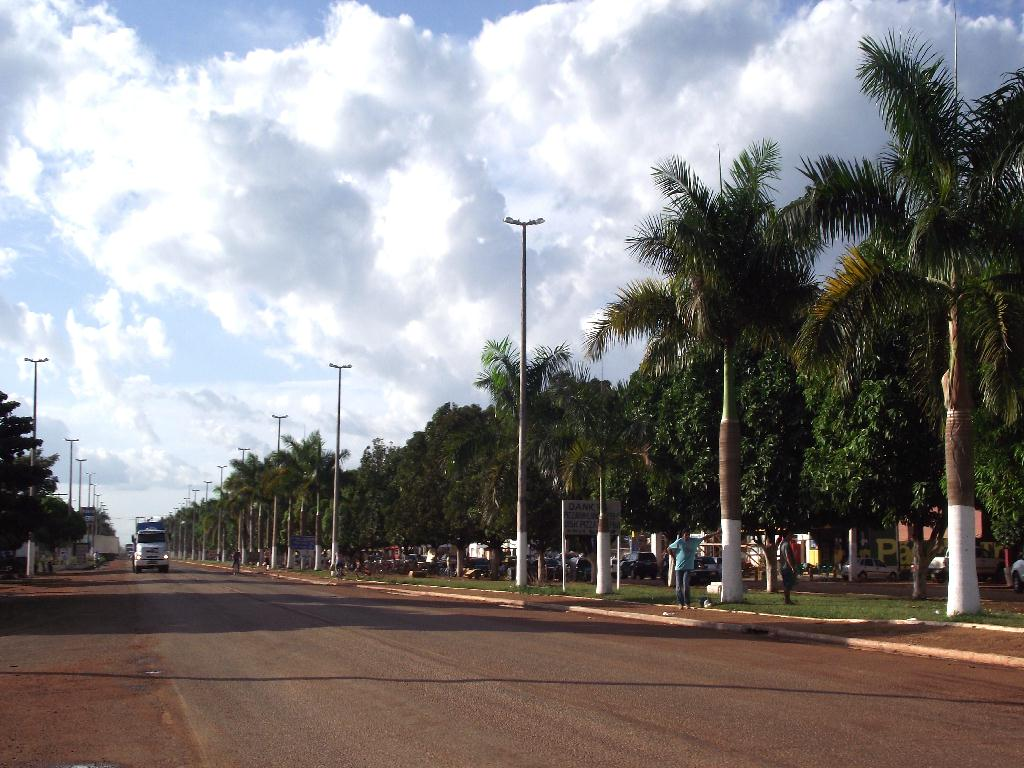
- BR-010 in Dom Eliseu, Pará

Route information
- Length: 1,954.1 km (1,214.2 mi)

Major junctions
- North end: Belém, Pará
- South end: Brasília, Distrito Federal

Location
- Country: Brazil

Highway system
- Highways in Brazil; Federal

The BR-010 (official name Rodovia Engenheiro Bernardo Sayão) is a federal highway of Brazil that connects the national capital Brasília, to the city of Belém, in the state of Pará. It is named after its chief engineer, who died in an accident during the construction of the highway, when a tree fell over his tent. The BR-010 highway is known as the Belém–Brasília Highway or Transbrasiliana Highway, in the stretch between the city of Estreito, in the state of Maranhão, and the city of Belém. Between Brasília and Estreito, the highway has many incomplete and unpaved stretches, especially in the state of Tocantins. Between Brasília and Estreito, the original route of the Belém–Brasília Highway follows the BR-060, the BR-153 and the BR-226 highways, which are completely paved in this stretch.

The total length of the highway is 1,950 km, passing through the Federal District and four states:

- Federal District: 44.6 km
- State of Goiás: 287.9 km
- State of Tocantins: 773.2 km
- State of Maranhão: 379.1 km
- State of Pará: 465,3 km

== History ==
The Belém–Brasília Highway was the first road built through the central and the middle north region of Brazil, having been built between 1958 and 1960. Its construction was one of the greatest achievements of road engineering, due to the enormous difficulties faced in its design and by the construction crews - more than 5,000 courses of water had to be conquered, and new ways of bulldozing and felling massive trees higher than 50 m and with girths exceeding 4 to 5 m in diameter had to be devised. Initially it was a dirt road, but in the succeeding years it was macadamized and more permanent bridges were built.

The BR-010 highway was fundamental to bring modernity to a completely wild region. Many agricultural settlements and entire new cities, with its suite of commerce, industry, etc., sprang along the highway. It was also the first land connection between the states of Pará and Maranhão, and all the rest of the country, so that the economic potential and development of the region could be increased. In its beginning, a trip through the road was a dangerous undertaking, due to the presence of wild animals such as the ferocious spotted jaguars and poisonous snakes, and also of road banditry. There were no hotels, gasoline stations and restaurants along the highway and travellers had to carry their own supplies. Today, it entails a drive of approximately 2 days.

== See also ==
- Belém–Brasília Highway
- BR-060
- BR-153
- BR-226
- BR-316
- BR-308
- Brazilian Highway System
- Juscelino Kubitschek de Oliveira Bridge collapse
