= BR-316 (Brazil highway) =

Highway in Brazil

BR-316

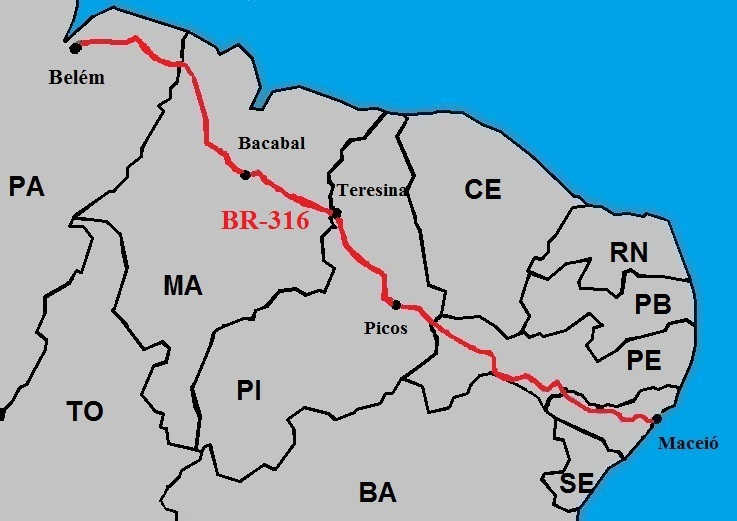

Route information
- Length: 2,062.2 km (1,281.4 mi)

Major junctions
- East end: Maceió, Alagoas
- West end: Belém, Pará

Location
- Country: Brazil

Highway system
- Highways in Brazil; Federal

The BR-316 is a Brazilian federal highway that connects the cities of Belém, in the state of Pará, and Maceió in Alagoas. It has a total length of 2,054 km.

The section between Belém and Santa Maria do Pará is a designated part of the Belém–Brasília Highway.

The highway passes through the driest area and one of the poorest in the country. In Alagoas, however, there is the largest sugarcane production in the Northeast Region of Brazil.
