= Belém–Brasília Highway =

Highway in Brazil

The Belém–Brasília Highway (Portuguese: Rodovia Belém–Brasília) is a set of portions of six federal highways of Brazil, of which each portion contributes to the function of connecting the Atlantic port city of Belém in the northern state of Pará and the Brazilian Federal District Brasília in the southern interior.

The Belém–Brasília Highway designation applies (between Belém and each respective city) to the following routes:

- BR-316 (Santa Maria do Pará),
- BR-308 (Santa Maria do Pará), and
- BR-010 (Estreito).

It also applies to

- BR-226 between Porto Franco and Wanderlândia,
- BR-153 thence to and from Anápolis, and
- BR-060 thence to and from Brasília.

In each case, the route in question extends beyond one or both of the cities that demarcate the respective stretch of the Belém–Brasília Highway, while the stretch(es) beyond lack that designation.

== History ==
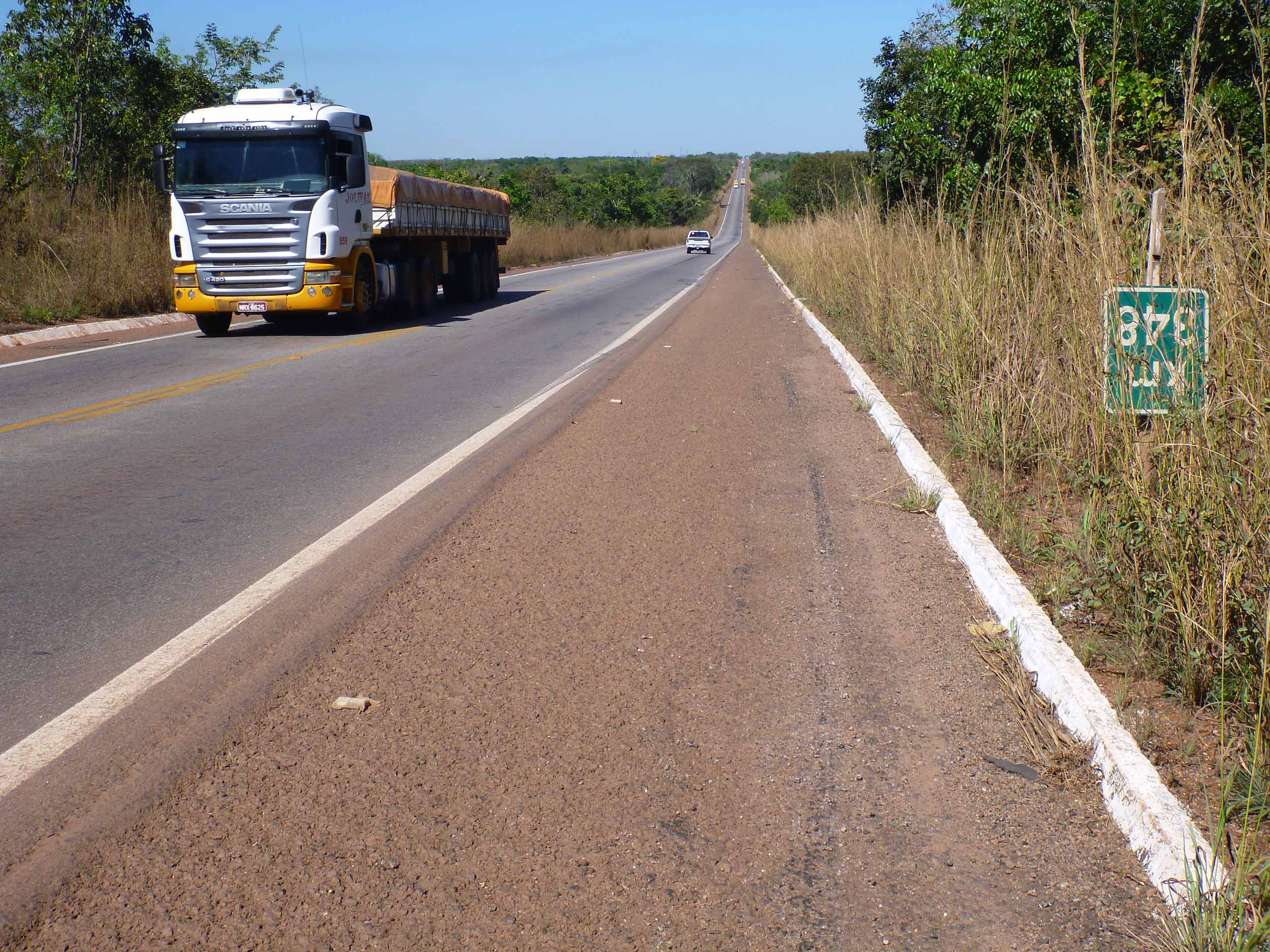
The Belém-Brasília Highway (BR-153 stretch) in the municipality of Fortaleza do Tabocão, Tocantins.

The Belém–Brasília Highway was the first road built through the central and the middle north region of Brazil, having been built between 1958 and 1960, and paved in 1974. Its construction was one of the highest achievements of road engineering, due to the enormous difficulties faced by designing it and by the construction crews (more than 5,000 water courses had to be conquered, and new ways of bulldozing and felling massive trees higher than 50 m and with girths exceeding 4 to 5 m in diameter had to be devised. Initially it was a dirt road, but in the succeeding years it was macadamized and more permanent bridges were built.

The Belém–Brasília Highway was fundamental to bring modernity to a completely wild region. Many agricultural settlements and entire new cities, with its suite of commerce, industry, etc., sprang up along the highway. It was also the first land connection between the states of Pará, Maranhão, Tocantins and northern region of Goiás, with all the rest of the country, so that the economic potential and development of the region could be increased. In its beginning, a trip through the road was a dangerous undertaking, due to the presence of wild animals such as the ferocious spotted jaguars and poisonous snakes, and also of road banditry. There were no hotels, gasoline stations and restaurants along the highway and travellers had to carry their own supplies. Today, it entails a drive of approximately 2 days.

== See also ==
- Brazilian Highway System
- North Region, Brazil
- BR-163
- Juscelino Kubitschek
- Emílio Garrastazu Médici
- Brazilian Miracle
- Agriculture in Brazil
- Animal husbandry in Brazil
- Cerrado
- Federal District
- Goiás
- Tocantins
- Maranhão
- Pará
