= BR-308 (Brazil highway) =

Highway in Brazil

BR-308
- Rodovia Transoceânica

Route information
- Length: 650.7 km (404.3 mi)

Major junctions
- East end: Alcântara, Maranhão
- West end: Belém, Pará

Location
- Country: Brazil

Highway system
- Highways in Brazil; Federal

BR-308 is a federal highway that connects the cities of Belém, Pará, and the locality of Atracadouro do Cojupe in the municipality of Alcântara in Maranhão.

It is also designated as part of the Belém–Brasília Highway, in its stretch between Belém and Santa Maria do Pará.

Near Alcântara, there is a space center from which satellite launch vehicles are launched, the CLA - Alcântara Space Center. In Latin America, CLA is the only competitor for the Kourou Space Center in French Guiana.
