= BR-153 (Brazil highway) =

Highway in Brazil

BR-153
- Transbrasiliana Highway
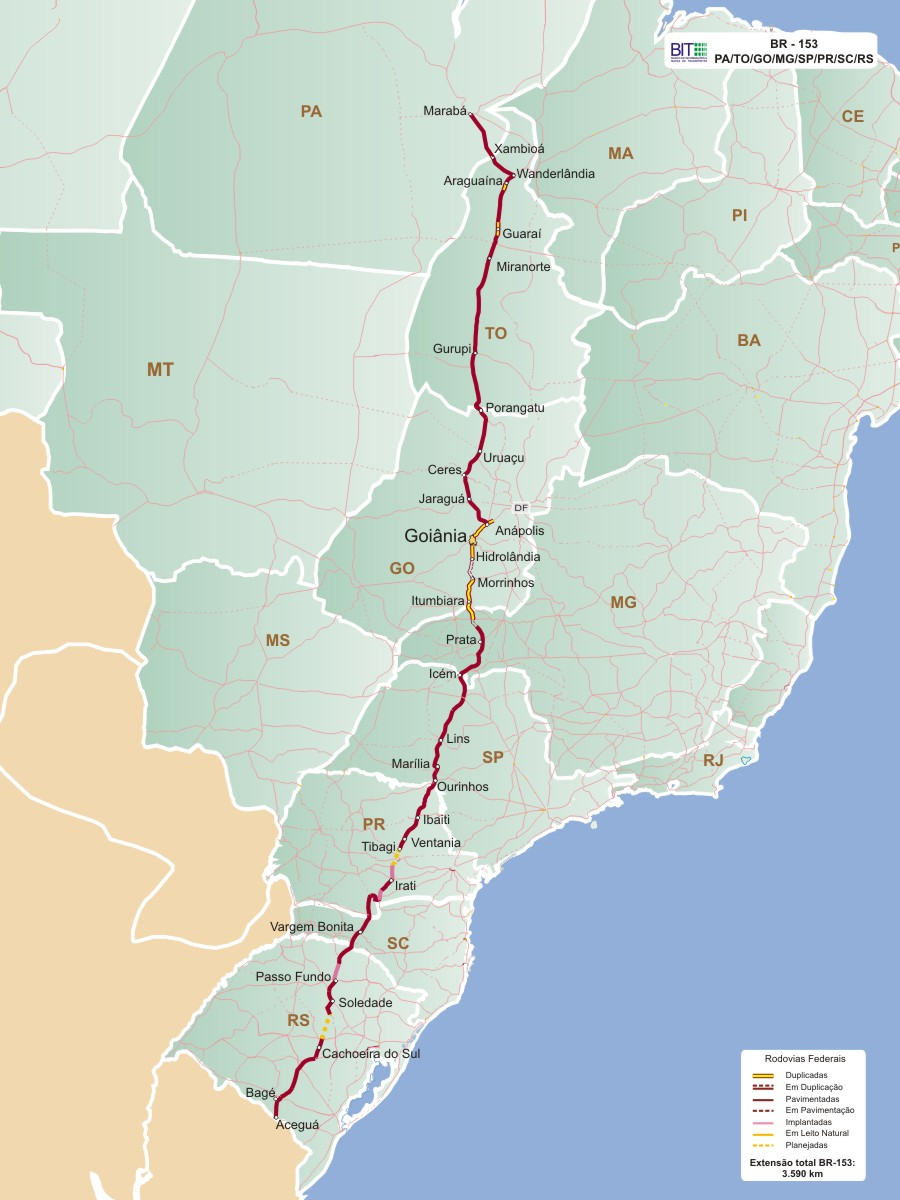

Route information
- Length: 2,234.14 mi (3,595.50 km)
- Existed: February 1, 1959–present

Major junctions
- North end: São Domingos do Araguaia, Pará
- TO-222 in Araguaína, TO; TO-080 in Paraíso do Tocantins, TO; BR-060 in Goiânia, GO; BR-456 in São José do Rio Preto, SP; BR-277 in Irati, PR; BR-285 in Passo Fundo, RS; BR-386 in Soledade, RS; RS-403 in Cachoeira do Sul, RS
- South end: Aceguá, Rio Grande do Sul / Brazil-Uruguay border

Location
- Country: Brazil

Highway system
- Highways in Brazil; Federal

BR-153 is a major federal highway of Brazil, officially named the Transbrasiliana Highway. It also serves as part of the Belém–Brasília Highway in the stretch located between the cities of Wanderlândia, in the state of Tocantins, and Anápolis, in the state of Goiás.

It crosses Brazil in a north–south direction, starting in São Domingos do Araguaia, in the state of Pará and ending in Aceguá, in the state of Rio Grande do Sul on the Brazil–Uruguay border. The highway, highly variable in quality and traffic, cuts through the states of Pará, Tocantins, Goiás, Minas Gerais, São Paulo, Paraná, Santa Catarina and Rio Grande do Sul.

== Duplication ==
A 315 km section between Anápolis and Monte Alegre de Minas has already been converted into a dual carriageway.

In 2020, the Federal Government planned to grant 850.7 km of the highway to the private sector, in the Anápolis (GO) section to Aliança (TO), to widened to a dual carriageway 623.4 km of the section.

== Gallery ==
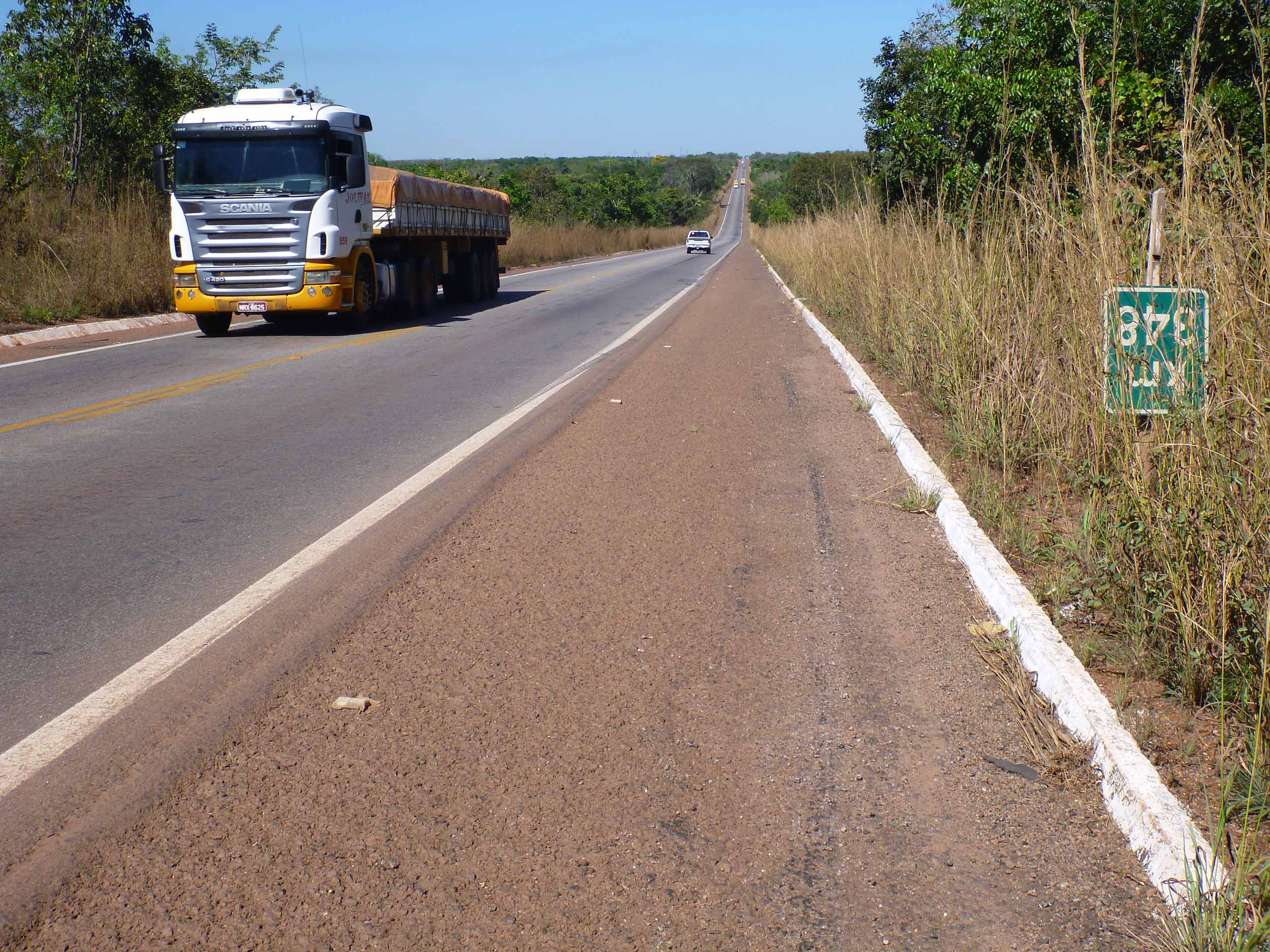
Stretch of BR-153 in Fortaleza do Tabocão, Tocantins.

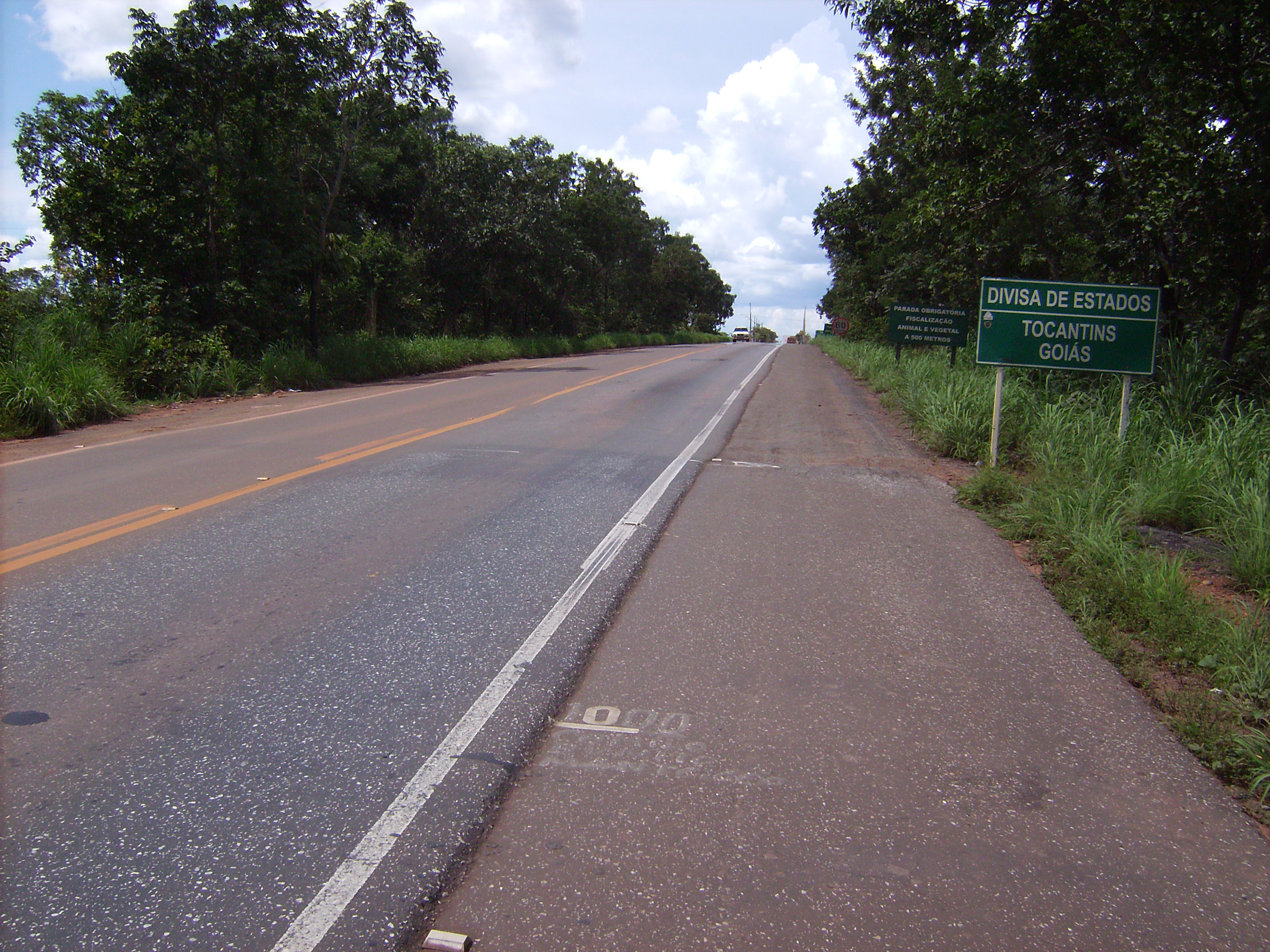
BR-153 on the Tocantins/Goiás state line.

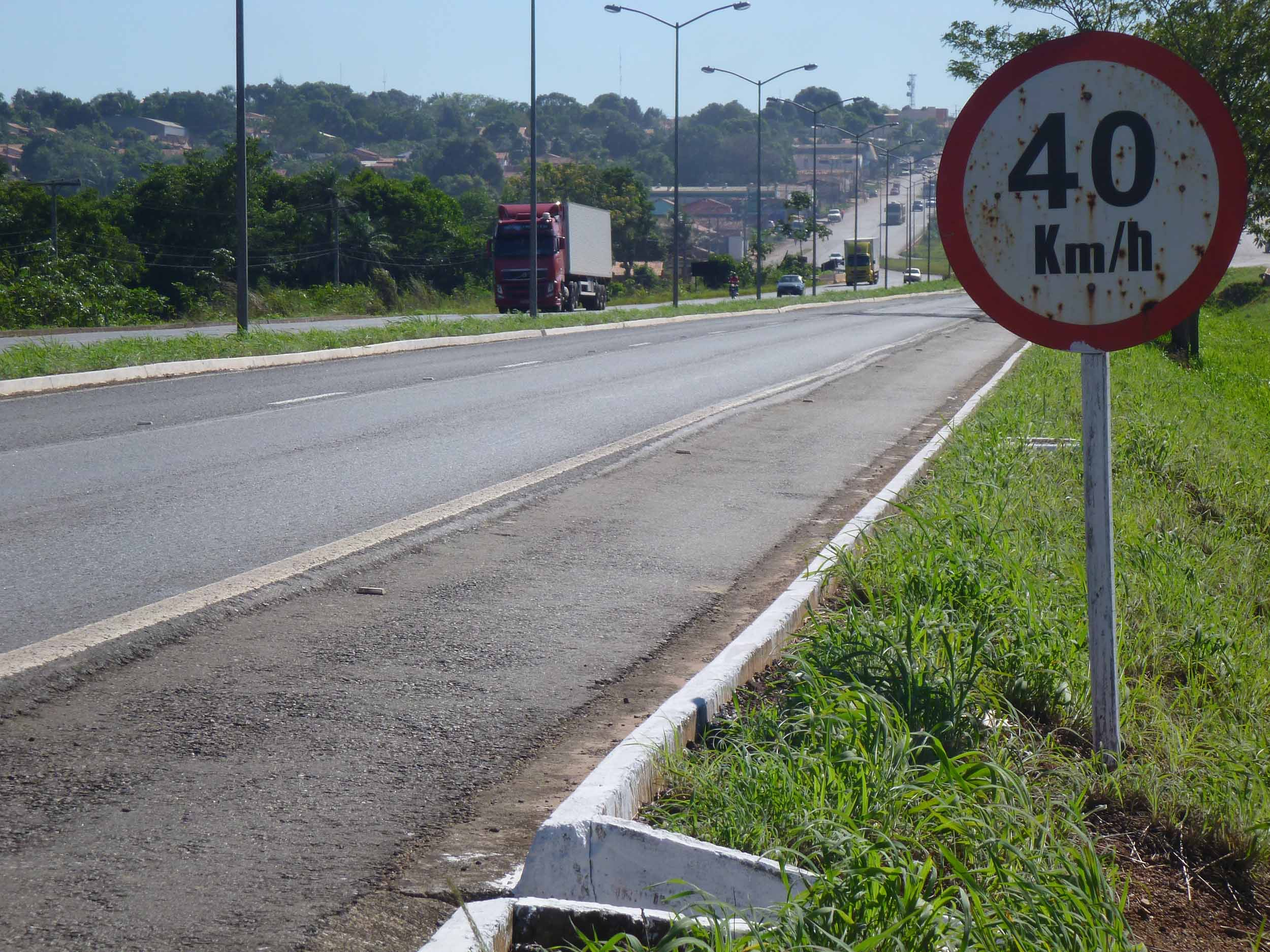
Urban segment of BR-153 in Araguaína, Tocantins.

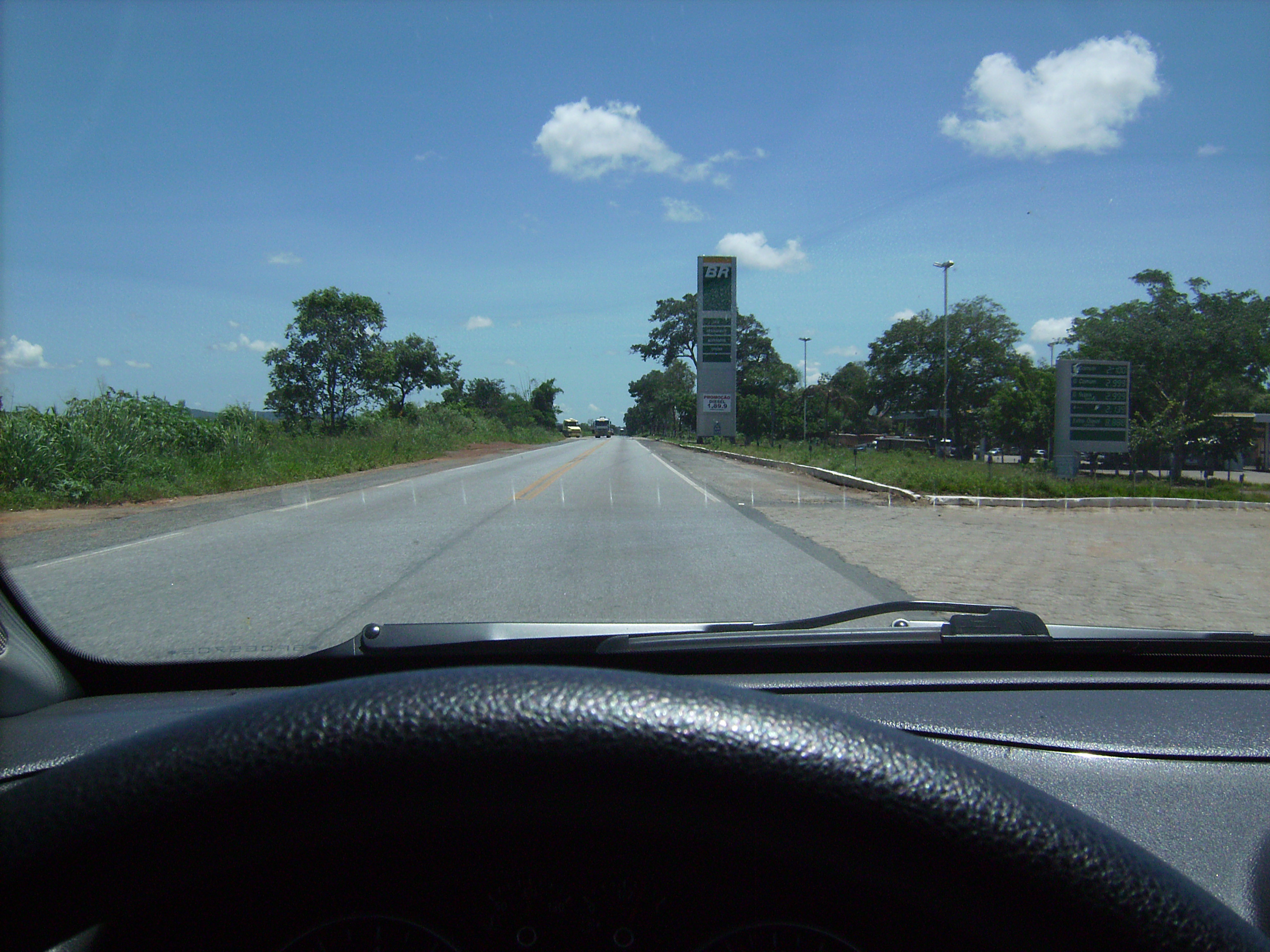
Section of BR-153 in Campinorte, Goiás.

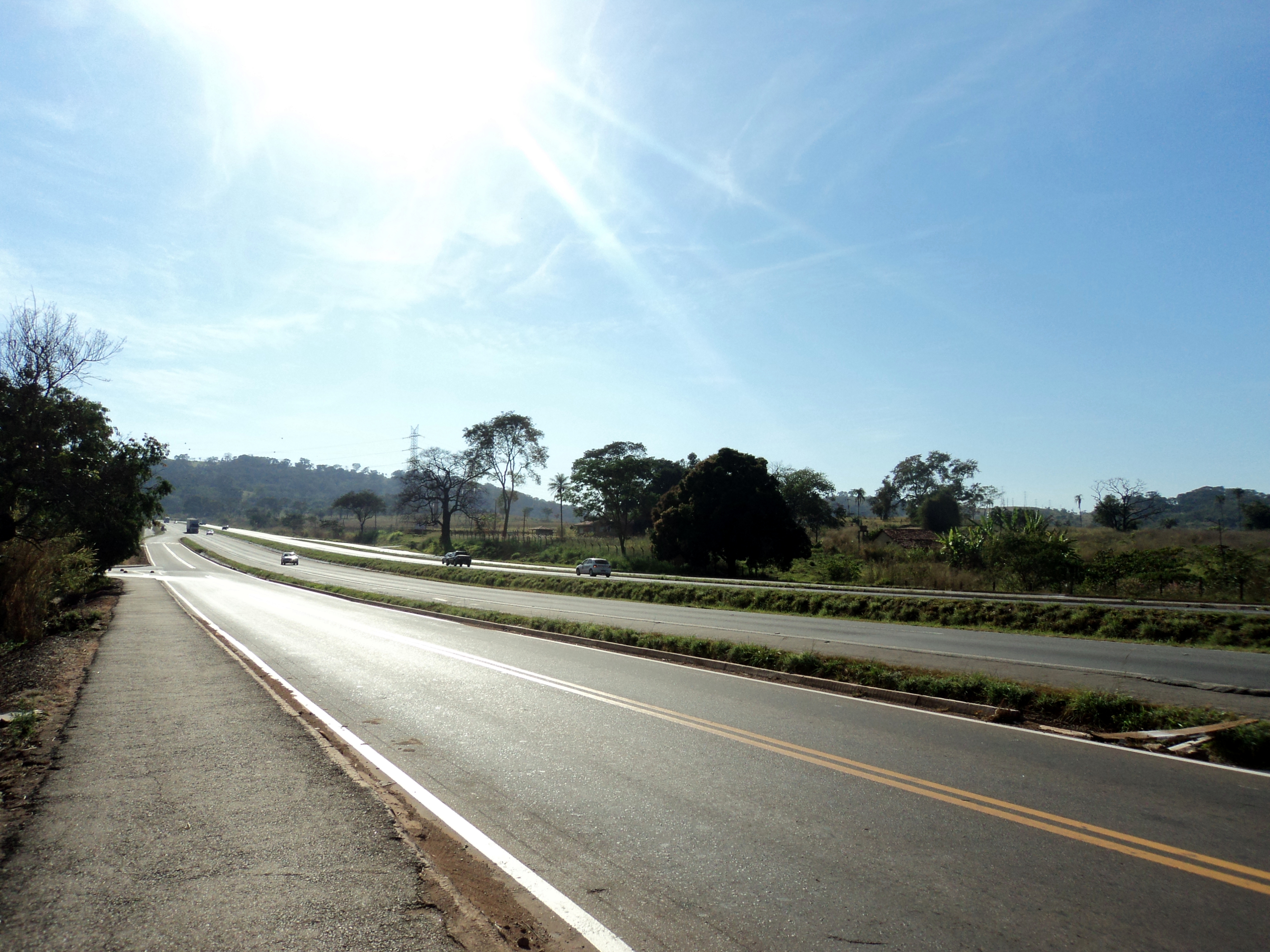
Stretch concurrent with BR-060 in Goiânia.

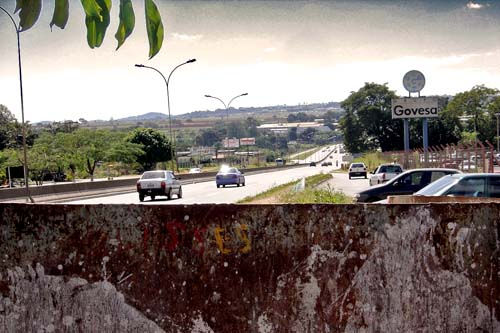
Urban segment of BR-153 in Goiânia.

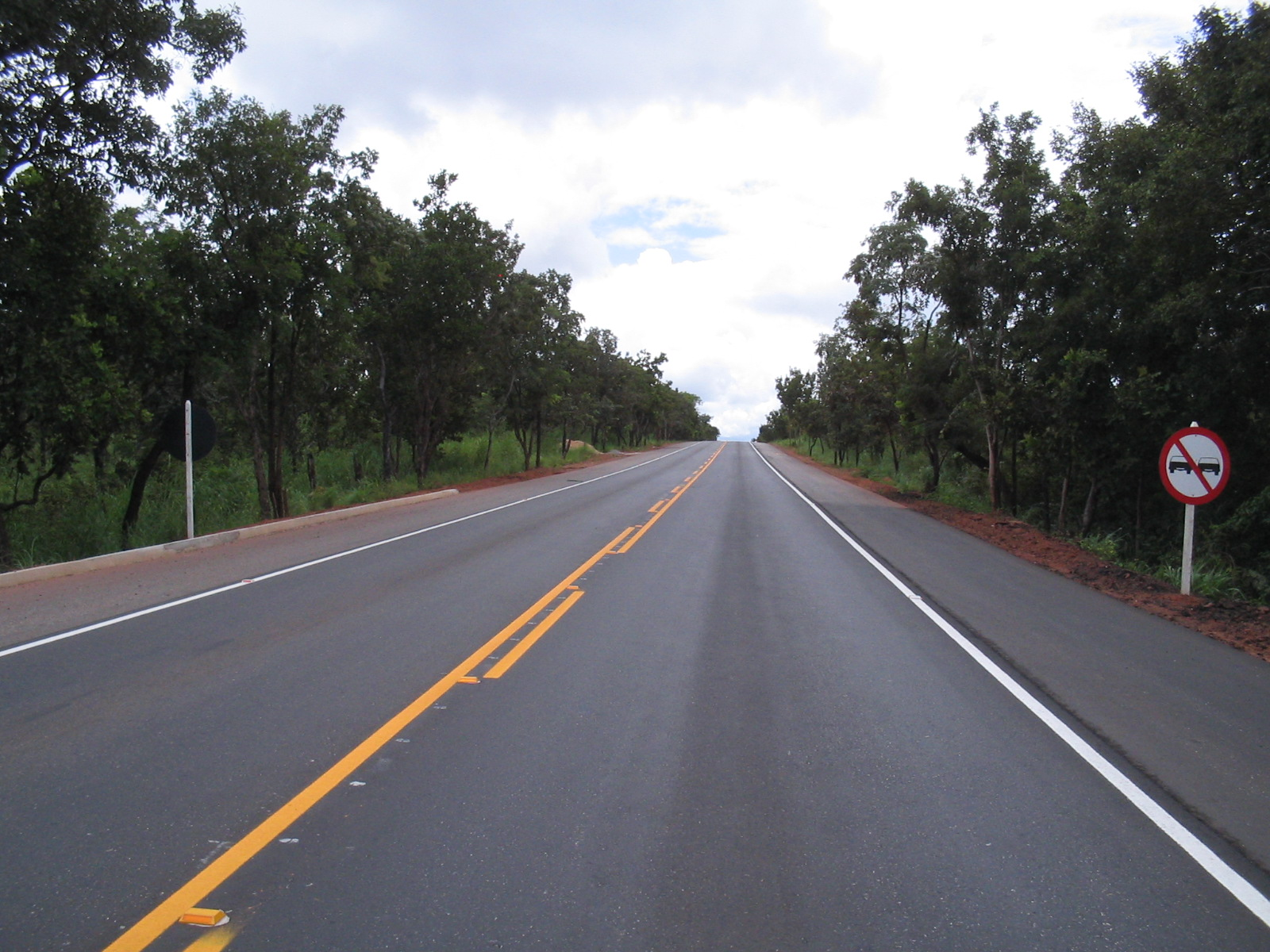
BR-153 in Minas Gerais

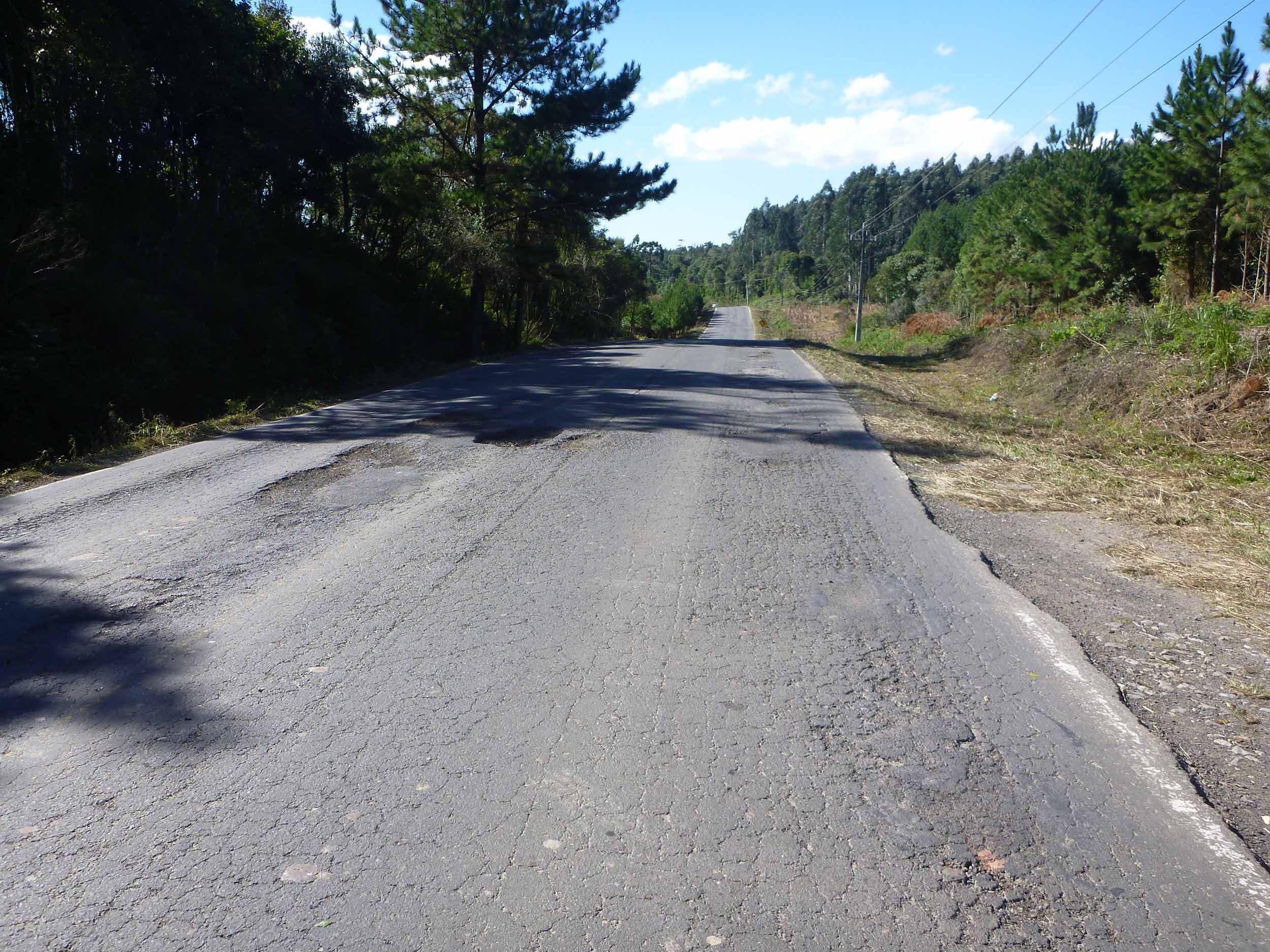
Precarious stretch of BR-153 in the rural area of Mallet, Paraná, 2013

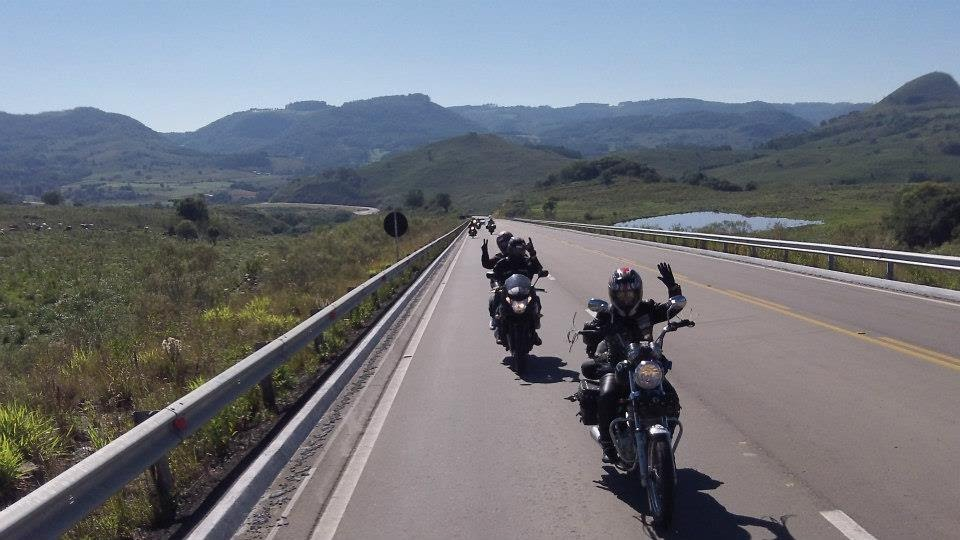
BR-153 in Herveiras, Rio Grande do Sul

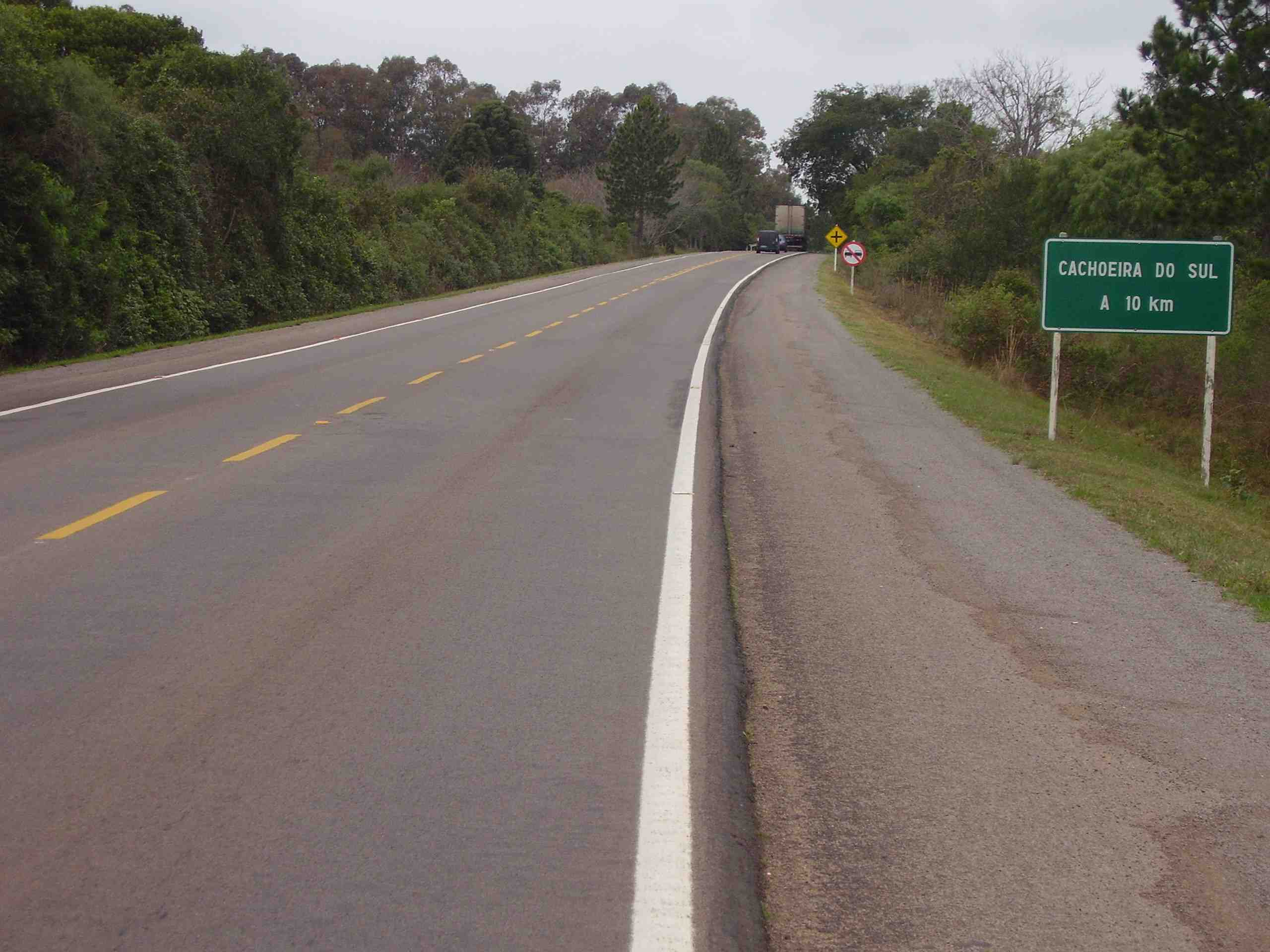
Segment of BR-153 in rural Cachoeira do Sul, Rio Grande do Sul.

== See also ==
- Paleorrota Geopark
- Belém–Brasília Highway
- Brazilian Highway System
- Route 8 (Uruguay)
