= BR-226 (Brazil highway) =

Highway in Brazil

BR-226

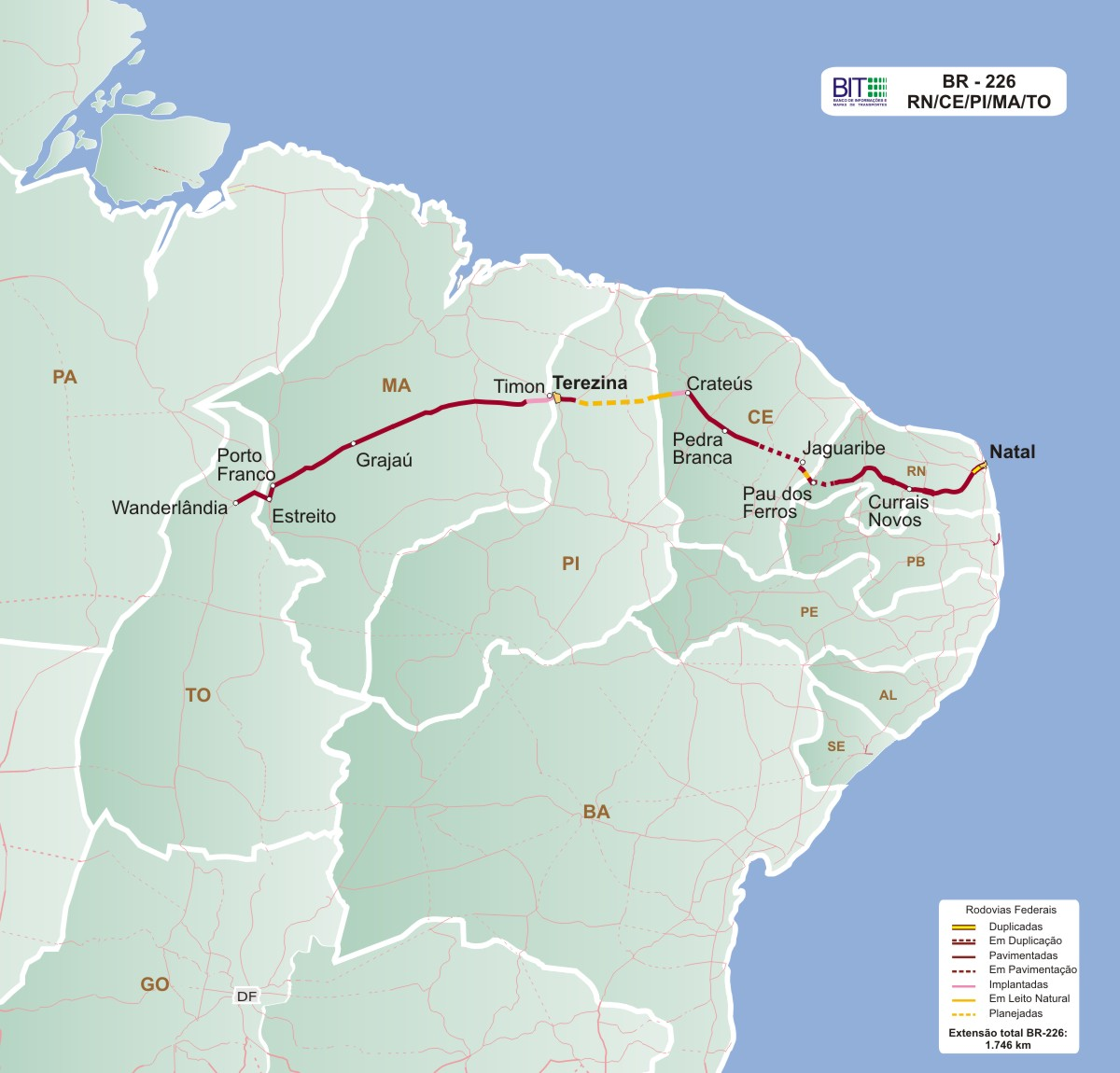

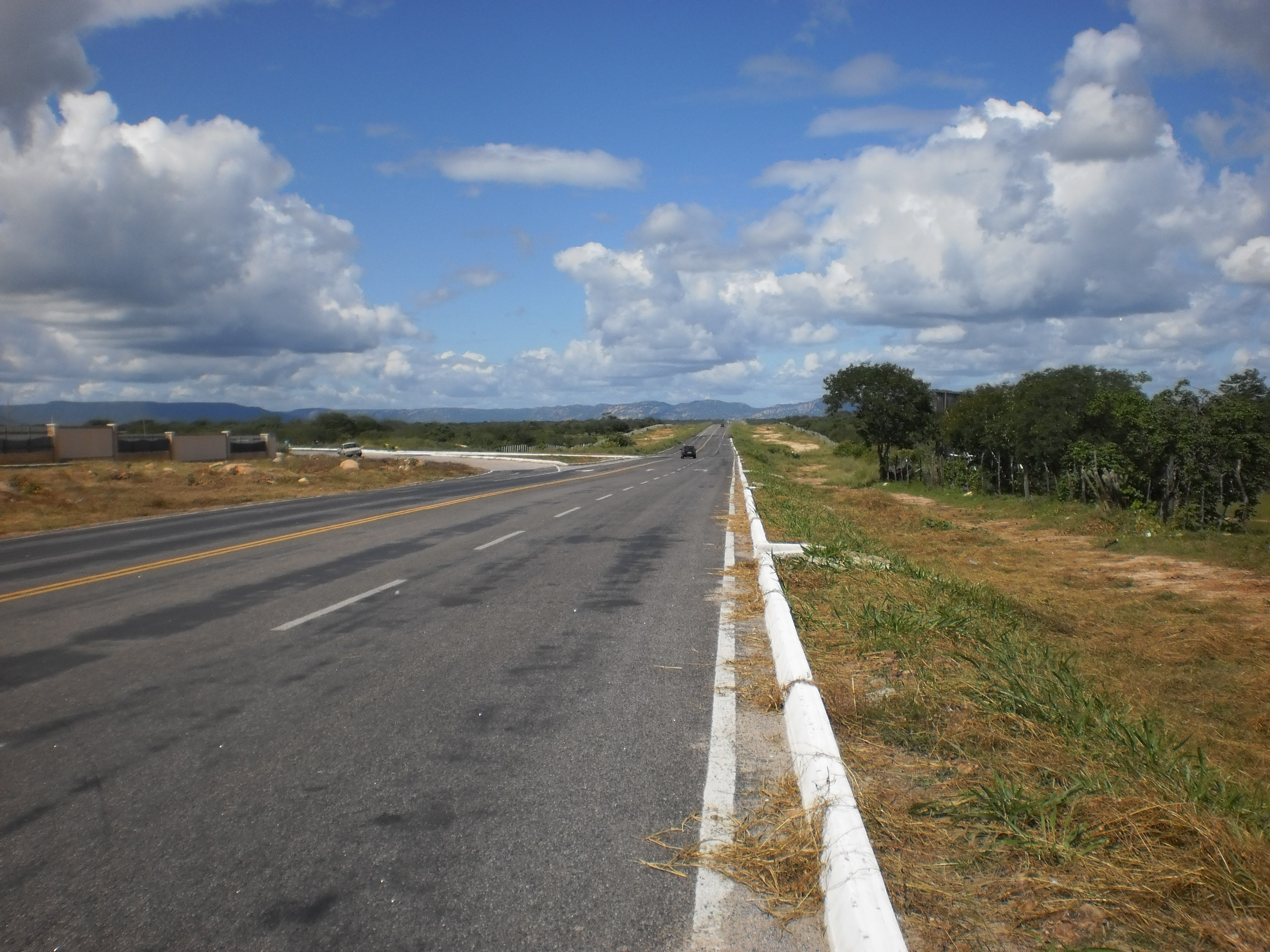
- BR-226 in Pau dos Ferros, Rio Grande do Norte

Route information
- Length: 1,673.0 km (1,039.6 mi)

Major junctions
- East end: Natal, Rio Grande do Norte
- West end: Wanderlândia, Tocantins

Location
- Country: Brazil

Highway system
- Highways in Brazil; Federal

BR-226 is a Brazilian federal highway that connects the cities of Natal, Rio Grande do Norte, and Wanderlândia, Tocantins. The highway leaves Natal, cuts the state of Ceará in half, arrives in the capital of Piauí (Teresina) and then cuts the state of Maranhão in half, reaching the north of the state of Tocantins, in the city of Wanderlândia.

It is also designated as part of the Belém–Brasília Highway, in its stretch between Porto Franco, Maranhão, and Wanderlândia.

== See also ==
- Juscelino Kubitschek de Oliveira Bridge collapse
