= Brazilian Highway System =

Highway system of Brazil

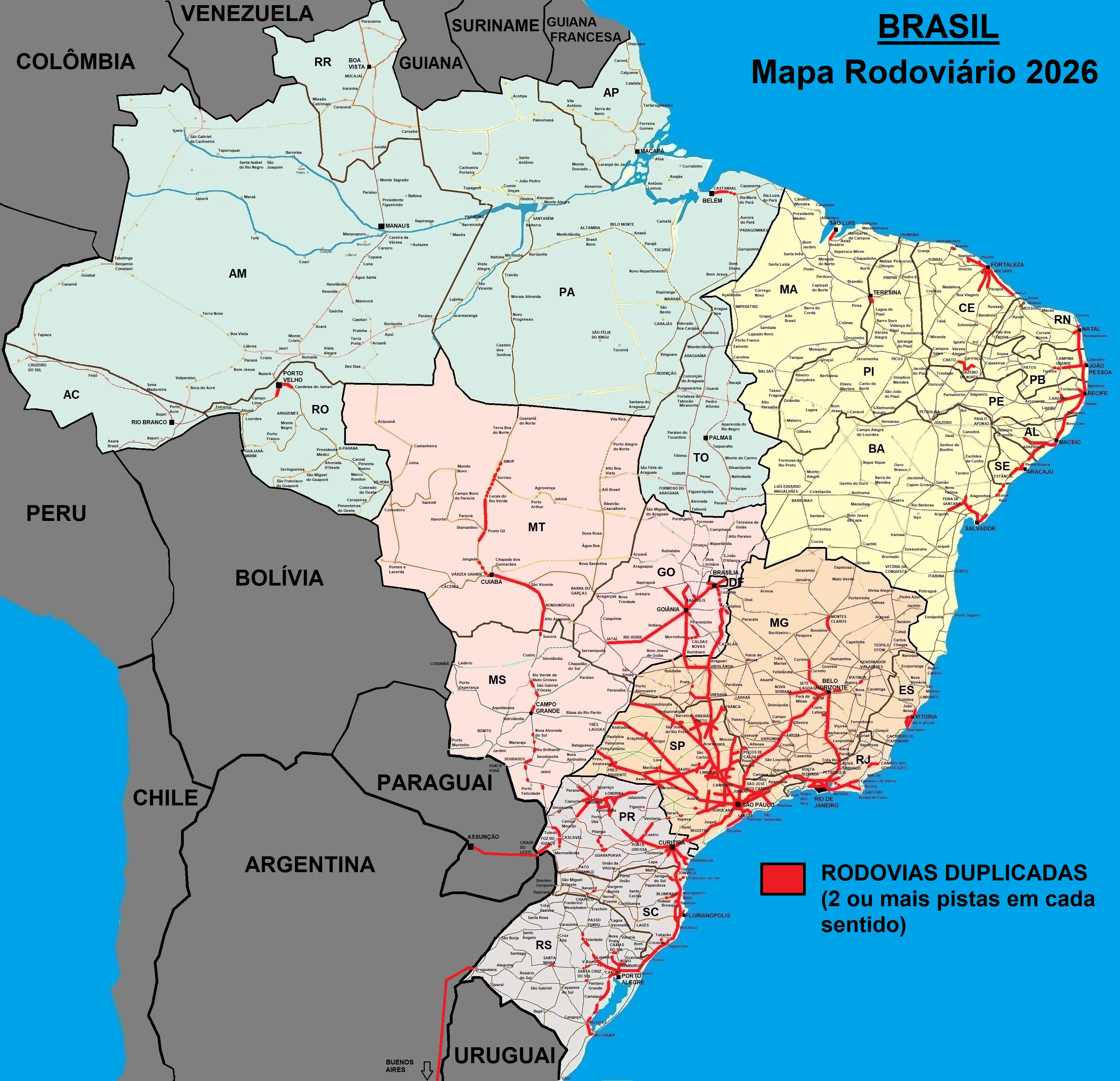
Road system in Brazil, with divided highways highlighted in red.

The Brazilian Highway System (Portuguese: Sistema Nacional de Rodovias) is a network of trunk roads administered by the Ministry of Transport of Brazil. It is constructed, managed and maintained by the National Department of Transport Infrastructure (DNIT), a federal agency linked to the Ministry of Infrastructure, and the public works departments of state governments.

The National Travel System (Portuguese: Sistema Nacional de Viação – SNV) comprises the road infrastructure and the operational structure of the different means of transporting people and goods. As for jurisdiction, the national road system is composed of the Federal Road Traffic System (Portuguese: Sistema Federal de Viação – SFV) and the road systems of the States, the Federal District and the Municipalities.

The Investment Partnership Program (PPI) is a major effort to expand and upgrade the network of highways aside with the Federal Highway Concessions Program (PROCROFE). The Ministry of Infrastructure often uses a public–private partnership model for highway maintenance, and toll-collection. Currently, the longest National Highway in Brazil is BR-116 with 4,486 km (2,787 mi).

== Characteristics ==
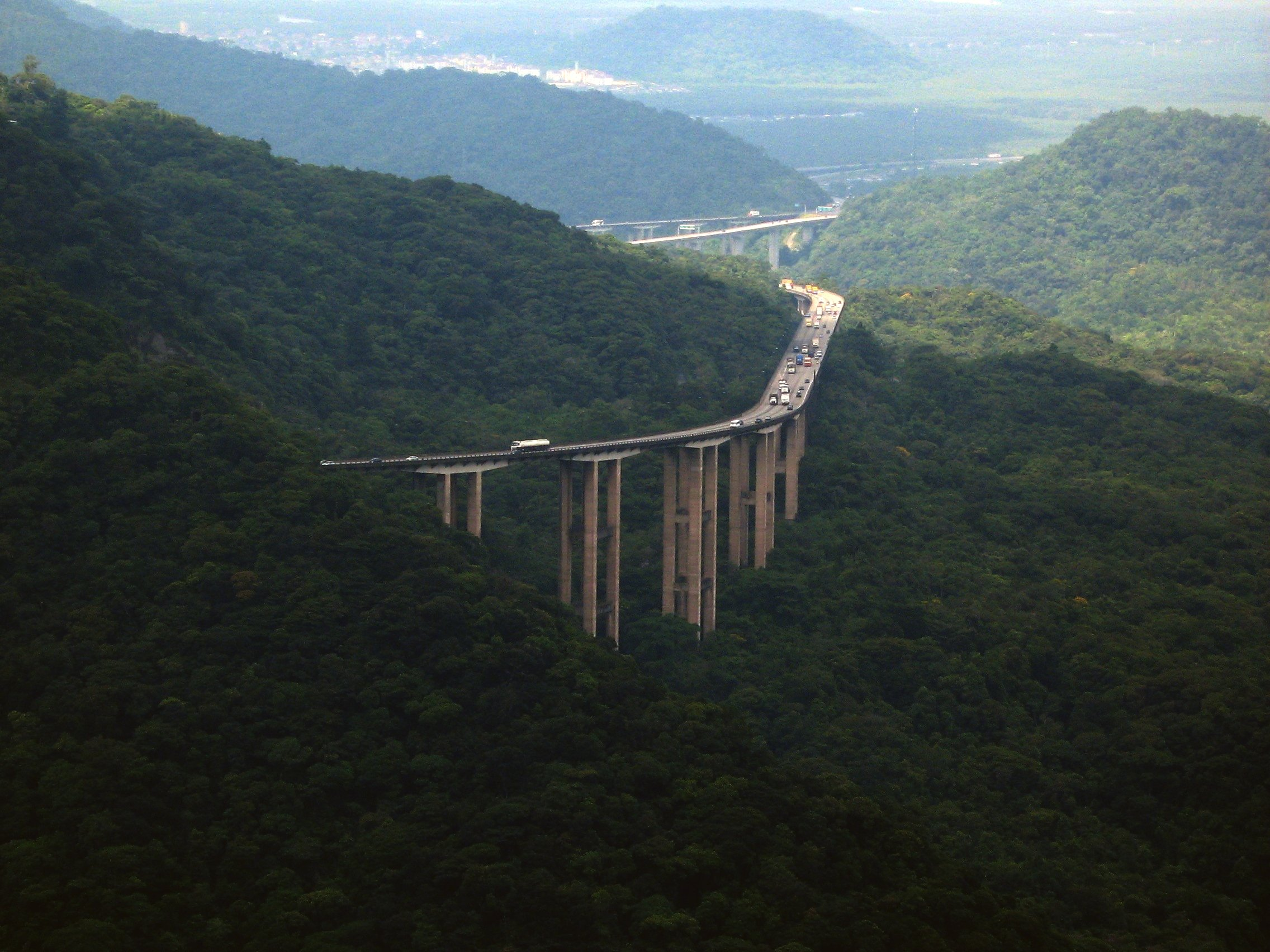
The SP-160, or Rodovia dos Imigrantes

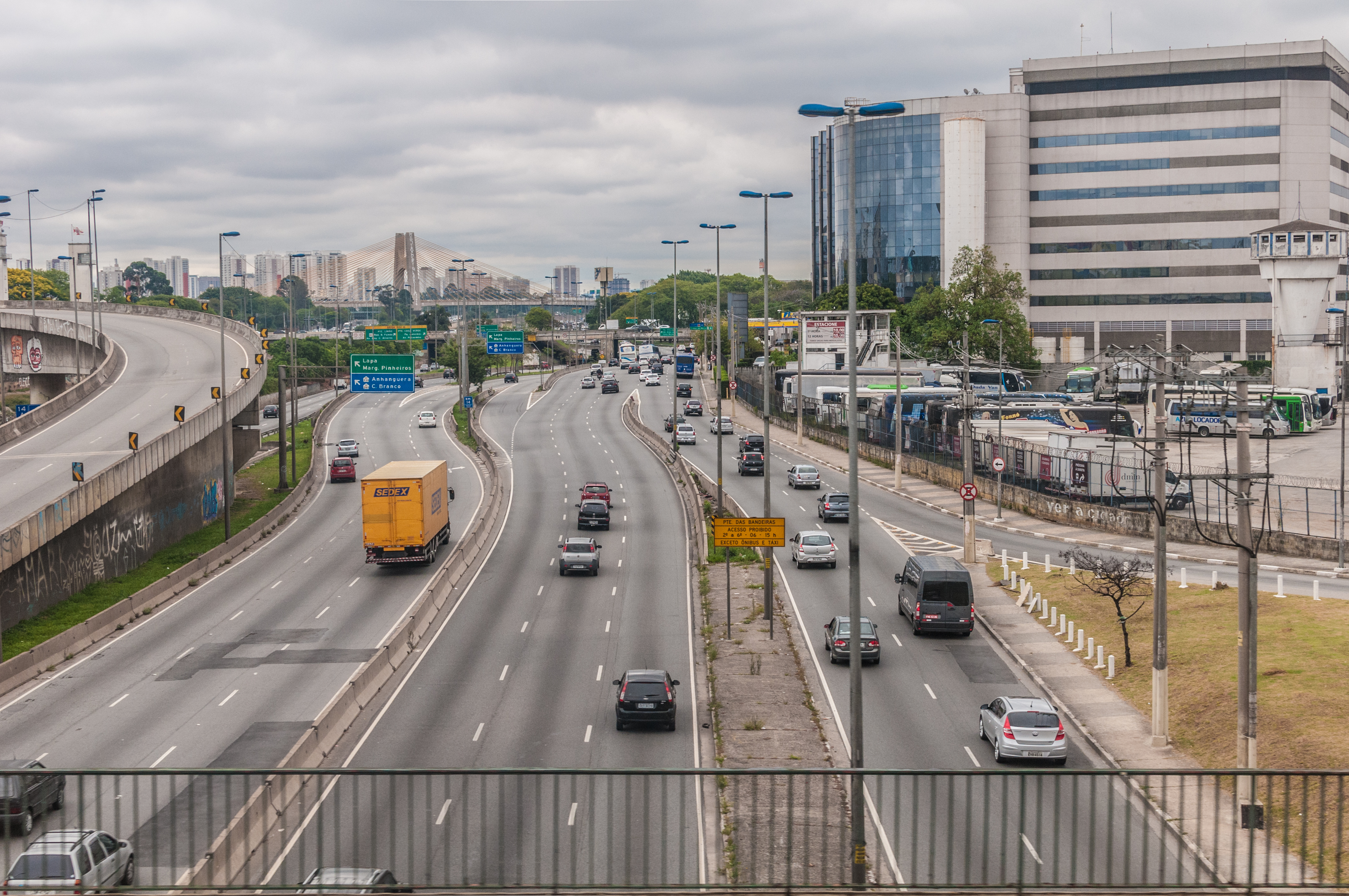
Tietê Highway in São Paulo.

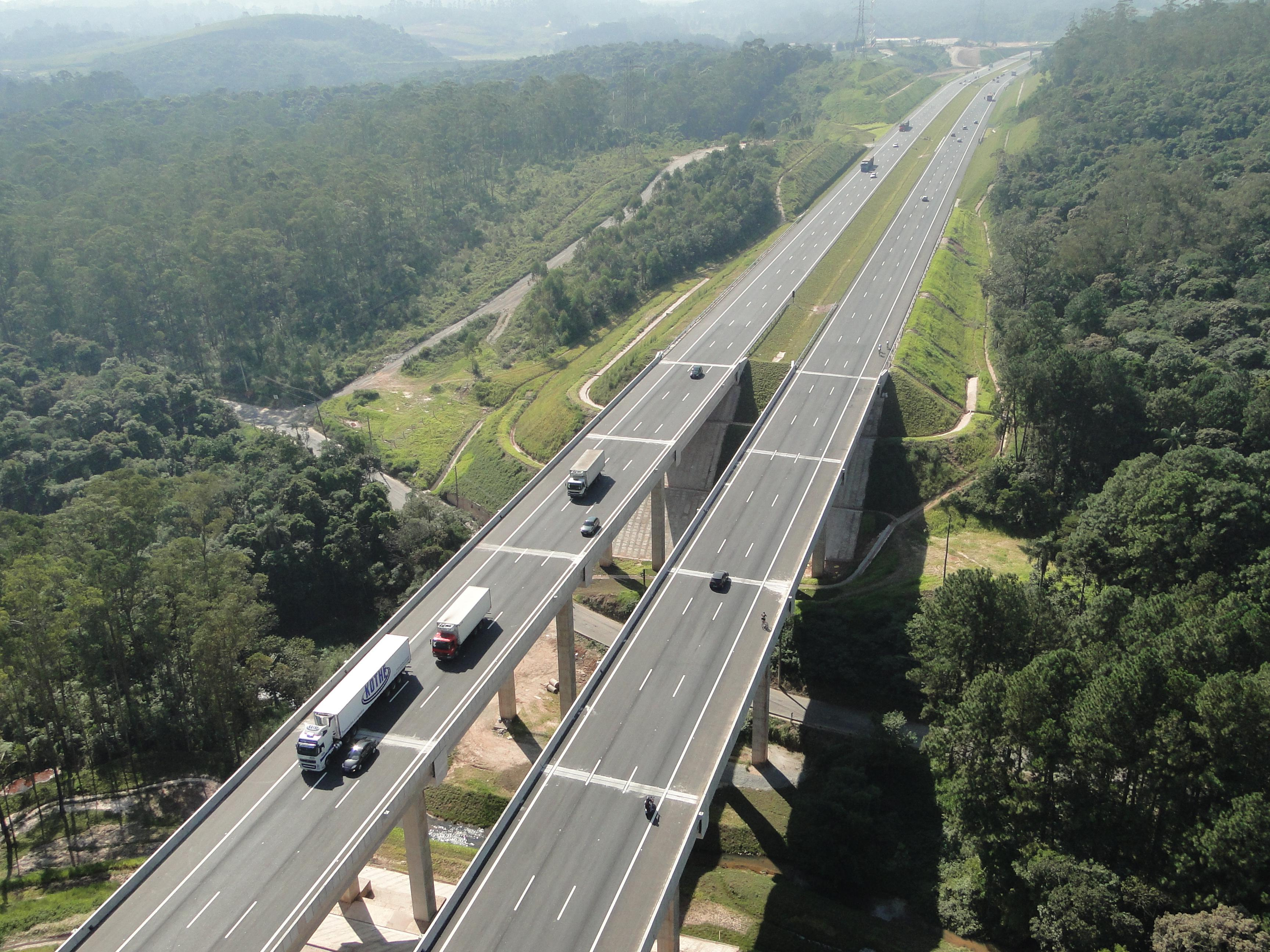
Mário Covas Beltway.

As of 2023, the system consists of 1,720,700 kilometres (1,069,200 miles) of roads, of which approximately 213,500 km (132,700 mi) are paved (12.4%), and about 17,000 km (10,563 mi) are divided highways, 6,300 km (3,915 mi) only in the State of São Paulo. Currently it is possible to travel from Rio Grande, in the extreme south of the country, to Brasília (2,580 km (1,603 mi)) or Casimiro de Abreu, in the state of Rio de Janeiro (2,045 km (1,271 mi)), only on divided highways. The total of paved roads increased from 35,496 km (22,056 mi) in 1967 to 215,000 km (133,595 mi) in 2018, with an expansion of 0.5% between 2009 and 2019. In 2009, Brazil had 1.03 km (0.64 mi) of paved road and 7.35 km (4.57 mi) of unpaved road per inhabitant.

In 2019, the Federal Highway System had 75,800 km (47,100 mi), of which approximately 65,400 km (40,600 mi) were paved (86.3%), and 10,355 km (6,434 mi) was under federal concession (PROCROFE). The most important federal highways in the country are BR-101 and BR-116.

Although Brazil has the largest duplicated road network in Latin America, it's considered insufficient for the country's needs: in 2021, it was calculated that the ideal amount of duplicated roads would be something around from 35,000 km (21,748 mi) to 42,000 km (26,098 mi). The main road axes also have problems because they often have inadequate geometry and constructive characteristics that don't allow quality long-distance flow (non-interference from local traffic and high speed).

The Brazilian Federal Government has never implemented a National Highway Plan at the same level as developed countries such as the USA, Japan or European countries, which specifically aimed at inter-regional travel, and which should preferably be served by highways. The Brazilian State, despite some planning efforts, has been guided by a reactive action to the increase in demand (only duplicating some roads with old and inadequate layout) and not by a purposeful vision, directing occupation and economic density in the territory. Another problem is the lack of directing the Union Budget towards infrastructure works, since there is no law that guarantees funds from the Federal Budget for works on highways and other modes of transport, depending exclusively on the goodwill of the rulers.

Brazil even invested 1.5% of the country's budget in infrastructure in the 1970s, being the time when the most investment was made in highways; but in the 1990s, only 0.1% of the budget was invested in this sector, maintaining an average of 0.5% in the 2000s and 2010s, insufficient amounts for the construction of an adequate road network. For comparative purposes, the average investment of the USA and the European Union was 1% between 1995 and 2013, even though they already have a much more advanced road infrastructure than Brazil.

The country still has several states where paved access to 100% of the state's municipalities has not yet been reached. Some states have 100% of cities with asphalt access, such as Santa Catarina, which reached this goal in 2014; Paraíba, which reached this goal in 2017, and Alagoas, which reached this goal in 2021. In states like Rio Grande do Sul, in 2020, there were still 54 cities without asphalt access. In Paraná, in 2021, there were still 4 cities without asphalt access. In Minas Gerais, in 2016, there were still 5 cities without asphalt access.

As it is in the United States, Canada, and most countries in Europe, larger/wider highways have higher speed limits than normal urban roads (typically between 80 km/h (50 mph) and 120 km/h (75 mph)), although minor highways, unpaved highways and sections of major highways running inside urban areas have a lower speed limit in general. The national speed limit for cars driving in non-urban roads is 110 km/h (68 mph) unless otherwise stated, regardless of the road design, weather or daylight.

== Nomenclature ==
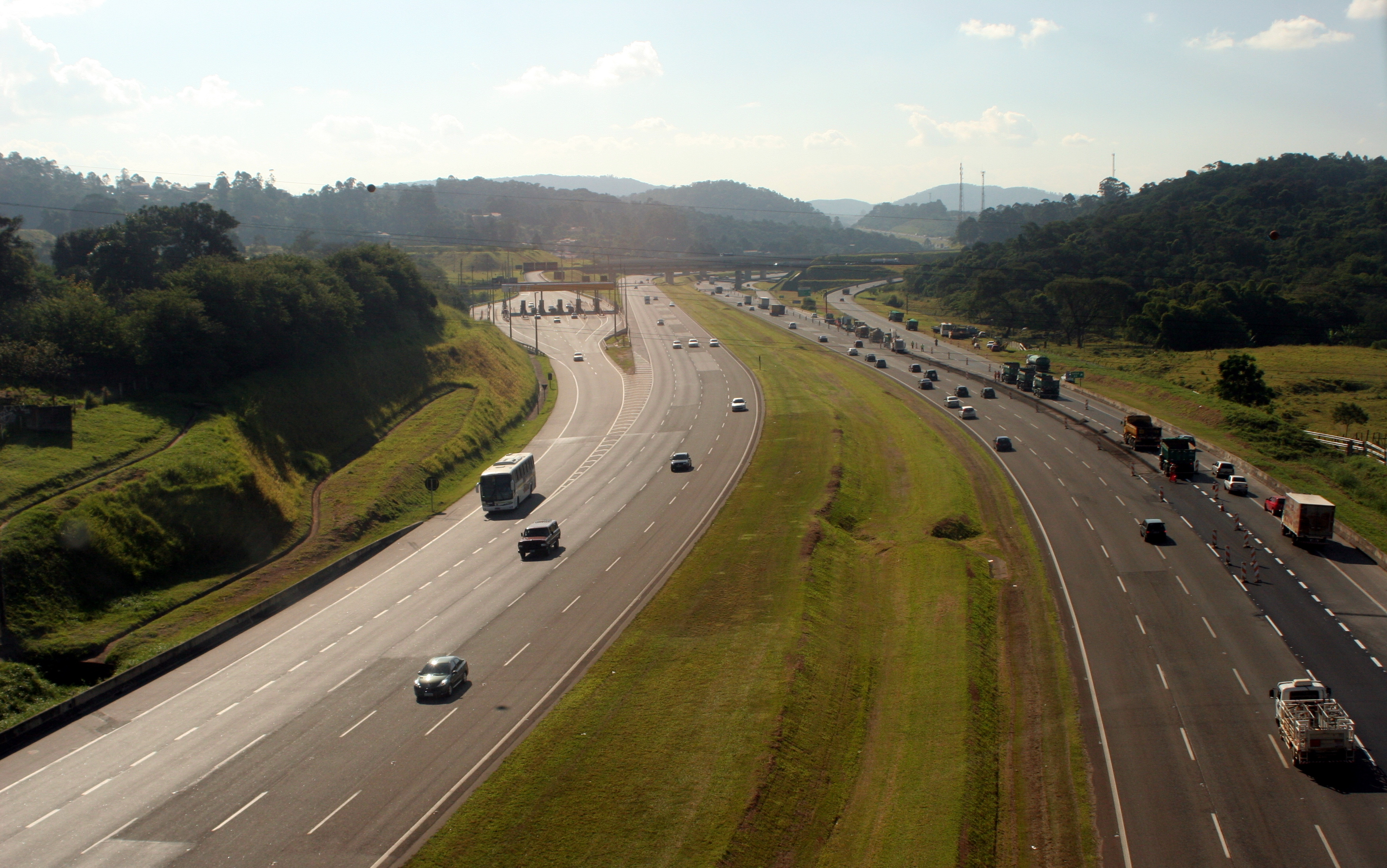
Rodovia dos Bandeirantes.

Brazilian State highways are named YY-XXX, where YY is the abbreviation of the state which administers the highway and XXX is a number (e.g. SP-280; where SP means that the highway is administered by São Paulo state).

Brazilian National highways are named BR-XXX. National highways connect multiple states together, are of major importance to the national economy and/or connect Brazil to another country. The meaning of the numbers are:

- 000-099 - means that the highway runs radially from Brasília. It is an exception to the cases below.
- 100-199 - means that the highway runs south–north
- 200-299 - means that the highway runs west–east
- 300-399 - means that the highway runs diagonally. Highways with odd numbers run northeast–southwest, while even numbers run northwest–southeast.
- 400-499 - means that the highway interconnects between two major highways.
- 600-699 - is a special designation given to highways of national importance but that just interconnect a highway to an important location. There currently are only two such highways in the country: BR-600 which connects the Itaipu Dam to BR-277 and BR-610 which connects Guarulhos International Airport to BR-116 and SP-070.

Often Brazilian highways receive names (famous people, etc.), but continue to have a YY/BR-XXX name (for example: Rodovia Castelo Branco is also SP-280).

See highway system of São Paulo for the numbering designation used for São Paulo state roads, which is also used in some other states.

== Major Federal Brazilian Highways ==
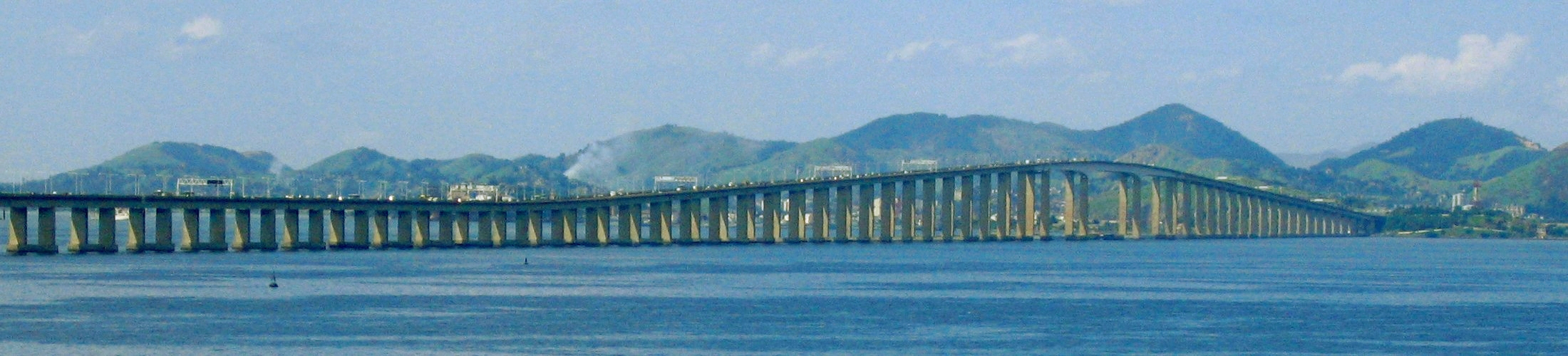
The Rio–Niterói Bridge, officially part of the federal BR-101 highway. Also a landmark of Rio de Janeiro

=== BR-010 ===
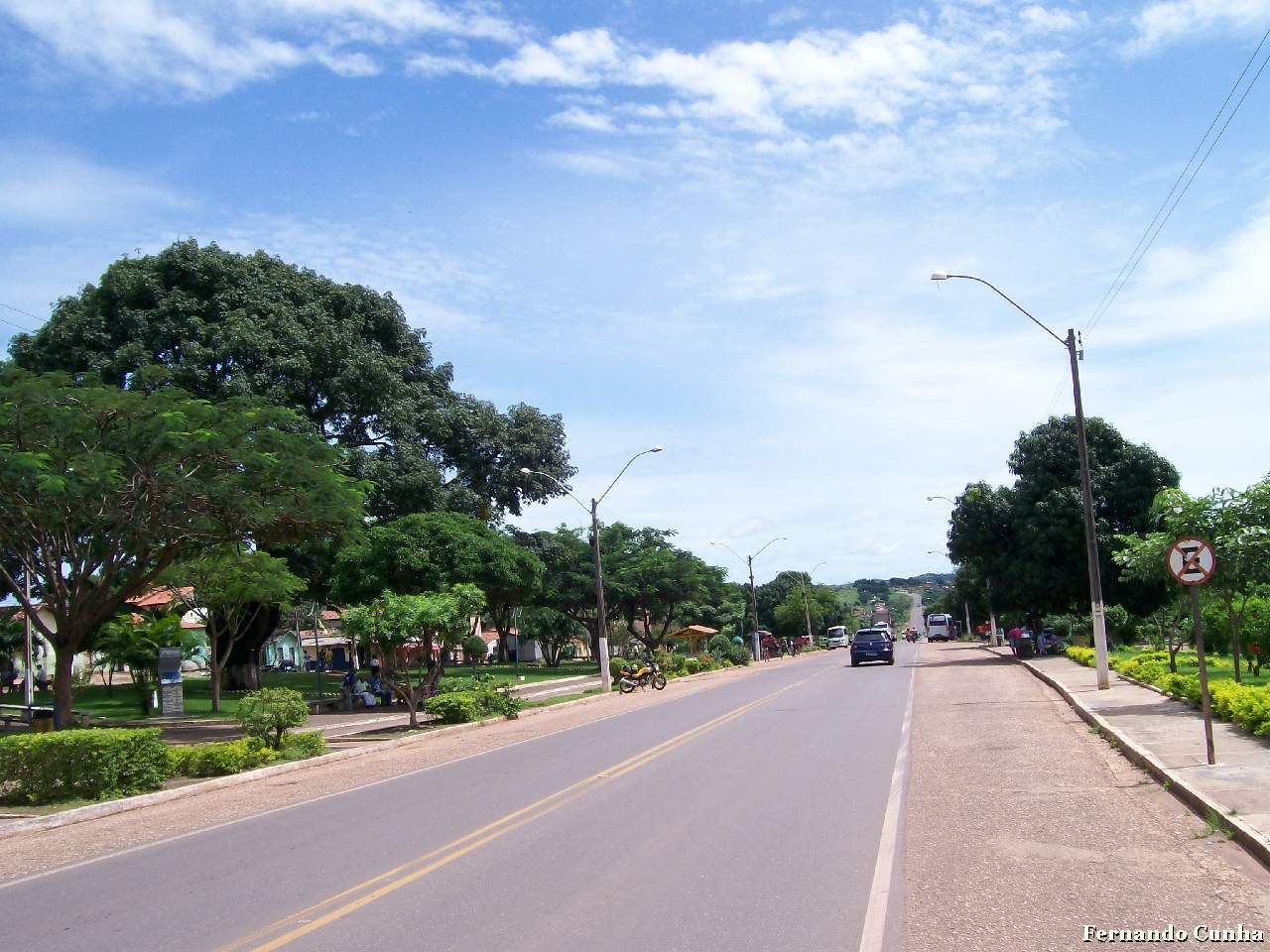
BR-010 in Maranhão.

The BR-010 is a radial highway that connects the national capital Brasília, to the city of Belém, in the state of Pará. It has the official name of Rodovia Bernardo Sayão (the name of its chief engineer, who died in an accident during the construction of the highway, when a tree fell on him), and is also called Belém–Brasília Highway or as Transbrasiliana Highway, in the stretch between the city of Estreito, in the state of Maranhão, and the city of Belém. This is due to the fact that between Brasília and Estreito, the highway has many incomplete and unpaved stretches, especially in the state of Tocantins. Between Brasília and Estreito, the original route of the Belém-Brasília Highway follows the BR-060, the BR-153 and the BR-226 highways, which are completely paved in this stretch. The BR-010 passes through the Federal District, and the states of Goiás, Tocantins, Maranhão and Pará.

=== BR-020 ===
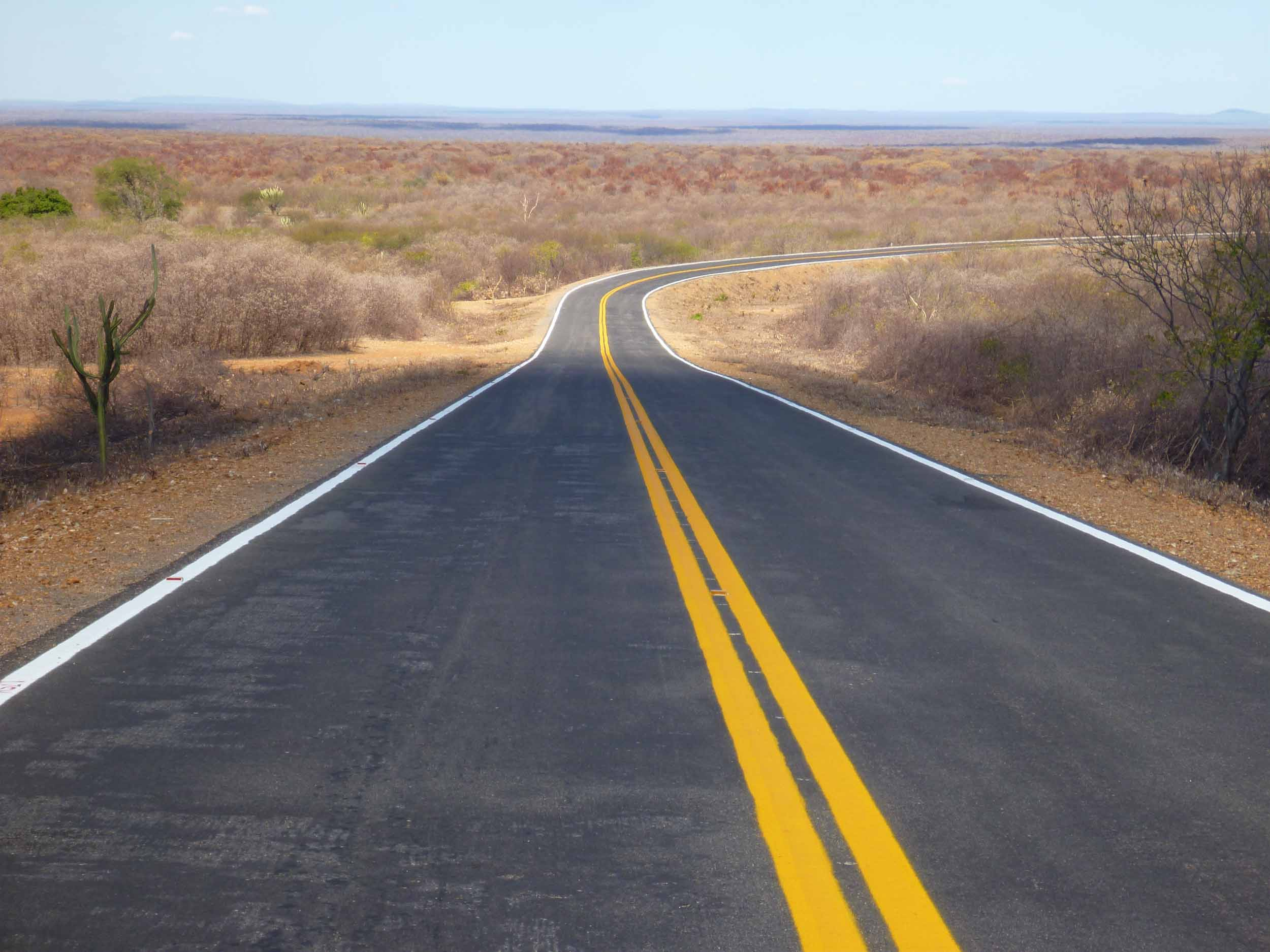
BR-020 in Piauí.

The BR-020 connects Fortaleza in Ceará to the federal capital Brasília. Like other BRs that start with the number 0, it leaves Brasília to an extreme point in Brazil. The highway is important because passes through the MATOPIBA region (in the south of Piauí and in the west of Bahia), which is an important producer of soybeans, corn and cotton, among other products. It connects the interior of the Northeast to the Port of Mucuripe, in Fortaleza.

=== BR-040 ===
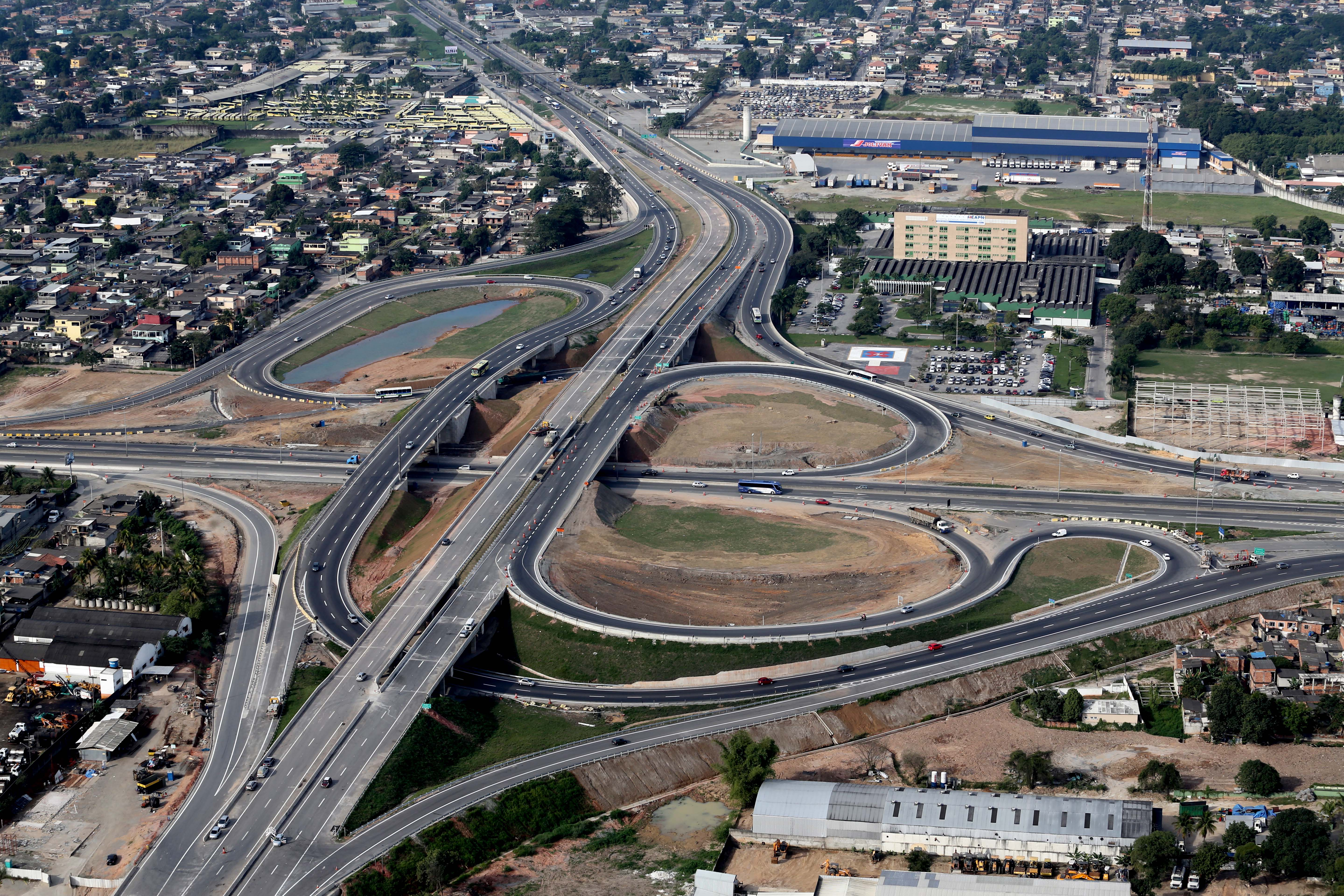
BR-040 in Rio de Janeiro.

BR-040 runs radially from near the national capital Brasília (beginning 100 km south of the beginning of BR-050, in Brasília), in a northwest–southeast way, to Rio de Janeiro city.

BR-040 is the modern way of the so-called "Caminho Novo", opened in the 18th century that linked Ouro Preto, the main center of gold mines of Minas Gerais to the Rio de Janeiro harbor.

In 1861 the road was paved from Petrópolis to Juiz de Fora, becoming the first road paved in Latin America until the 1920s. In 1928, Petrópolis was connected to Rio de Janeiro with a paved road.

In the 1930s the route was changed to pass by the new capital of Minas Gerais, Belo Horizonte, although it was unpaved until 1957, when the road was extended to Brasília, the new capital of Brazil.

From 1951 to 1973 BR-040 was called BR-3 and was famous for its dangerous bends, such as the Viaduto das Almas, near Belo Horizonte, disabled in 2010. In the 1970s the part from Rio de Janeiro to Juiz de Fora was modernized and became a two-laned road.

Cities where the BR-040 runs or passes by: Luislândia, Belo Horizonte, Juiz de Fora, Rio de Janeiro.

=== BR-050 ===
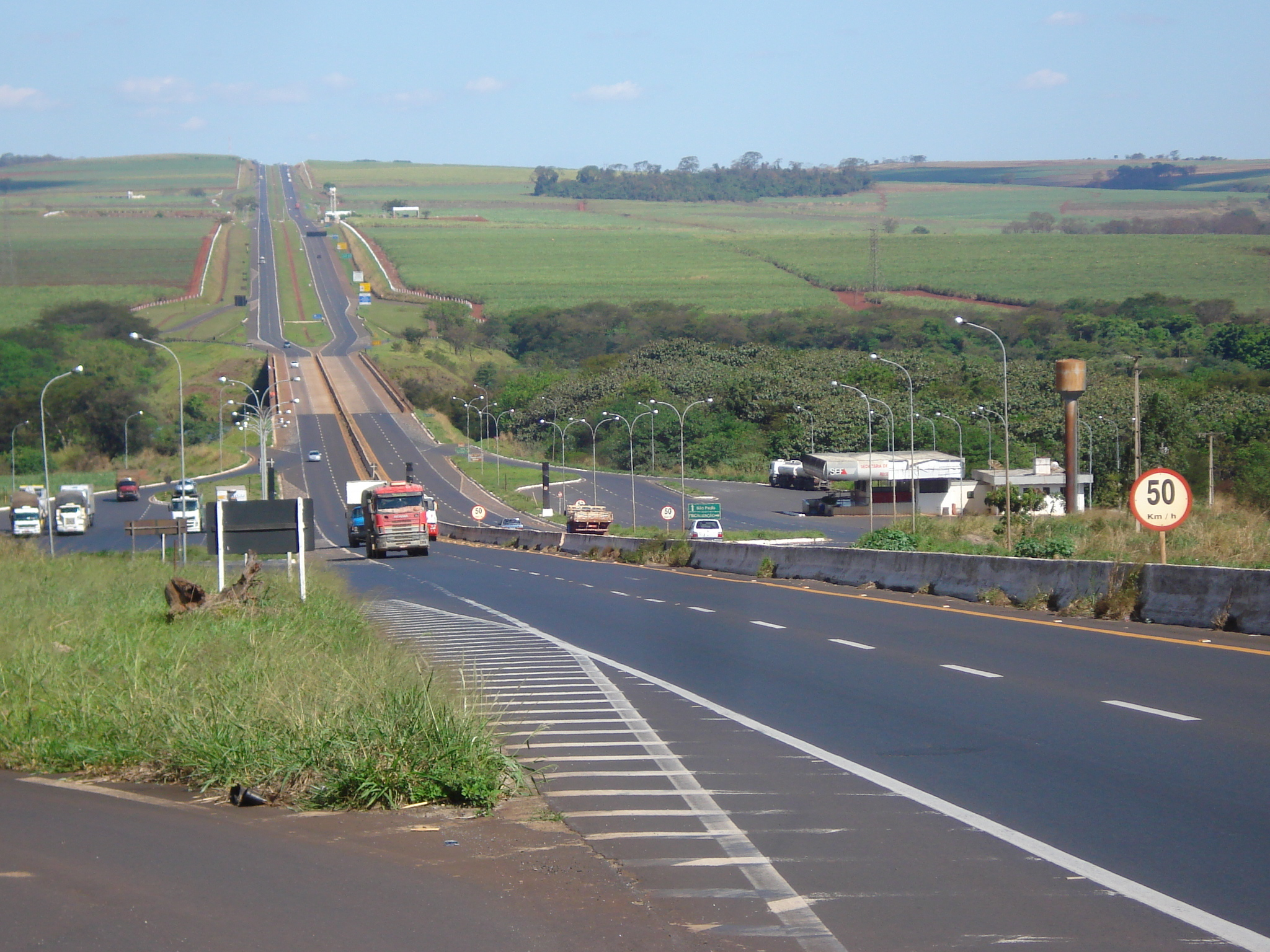
BR-050 between São Paulo and Minas Gerais

BR-050 runs radially from the national capital, Brasília, in a north–south way, to Santos city, passing in São Paulo. It's one of the most important highways in the country: being close to being fully duplicated in 2021, it passes through some of the richest regions of Brazil. It links areas of large agricultural and industrial production to Port of Santos, the largest in the country. Brasília is the city with the highest average salary per inhabitant. Goiás is one of the largest national producers of sugarcane, soy, corn and tomatoes, in addition to having a large cattle ranching. The area between Uberaba and Uberlândia, in Minas Gerais, has the largest milk production in Brazil. The state of São Paulo holds 30% of Brazil's industrial GDP and a gigantic agricultural sector. In Ribeirão Preto there is the largest production of sugarcane in the world. In Franca, there is the largest national production of men's shoes. The highway also drains the gigantic production of coffee from Minas Gerais and orange juice from São Paulo. In the area around Campinas there is a great technological production. 40% of the cars produced in the country come from the cities of Greater São Paulo. Not to mention the production of chicken meat and all industrial production in São Paulo, which is basically exported via Santos.

=== BR-060 ===
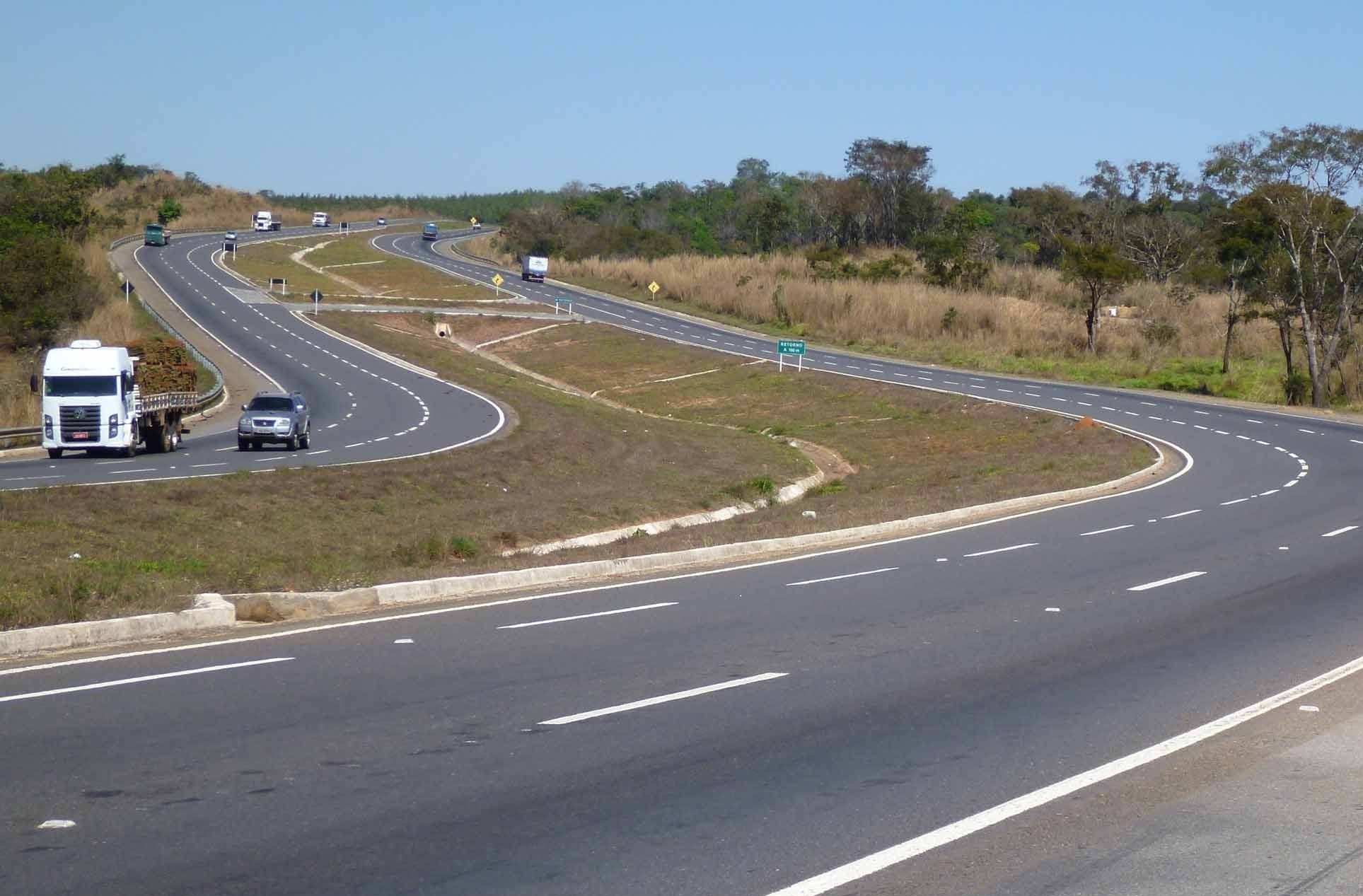
BR-060 in Goiânia, going to Anápolis

This road connects Brasília to Bela Vista, on the Paraguayan border. The highway is important because helps in the flow of agricultural production in the Center-West Region, which specializes in: soybeans, corn, sugarcane, tomatoes, beans, in the planting of eucalyptus for the production of cellulose and paper, and in cattle raising. Goiás and Mato Grosso do Sul also have considerable mineral exploration, producing a lot of iron ore, nickel and copper, in addition to gold, manganese and niobium. The BR-060 will in the future serve as a link with the Bioceanic Corridor that is being built with 3 other South American countries, connecting Campo Grande to Antofagasta, passing through Paraguay, northern Argentina and northern Chile.

=== BR-101 ===
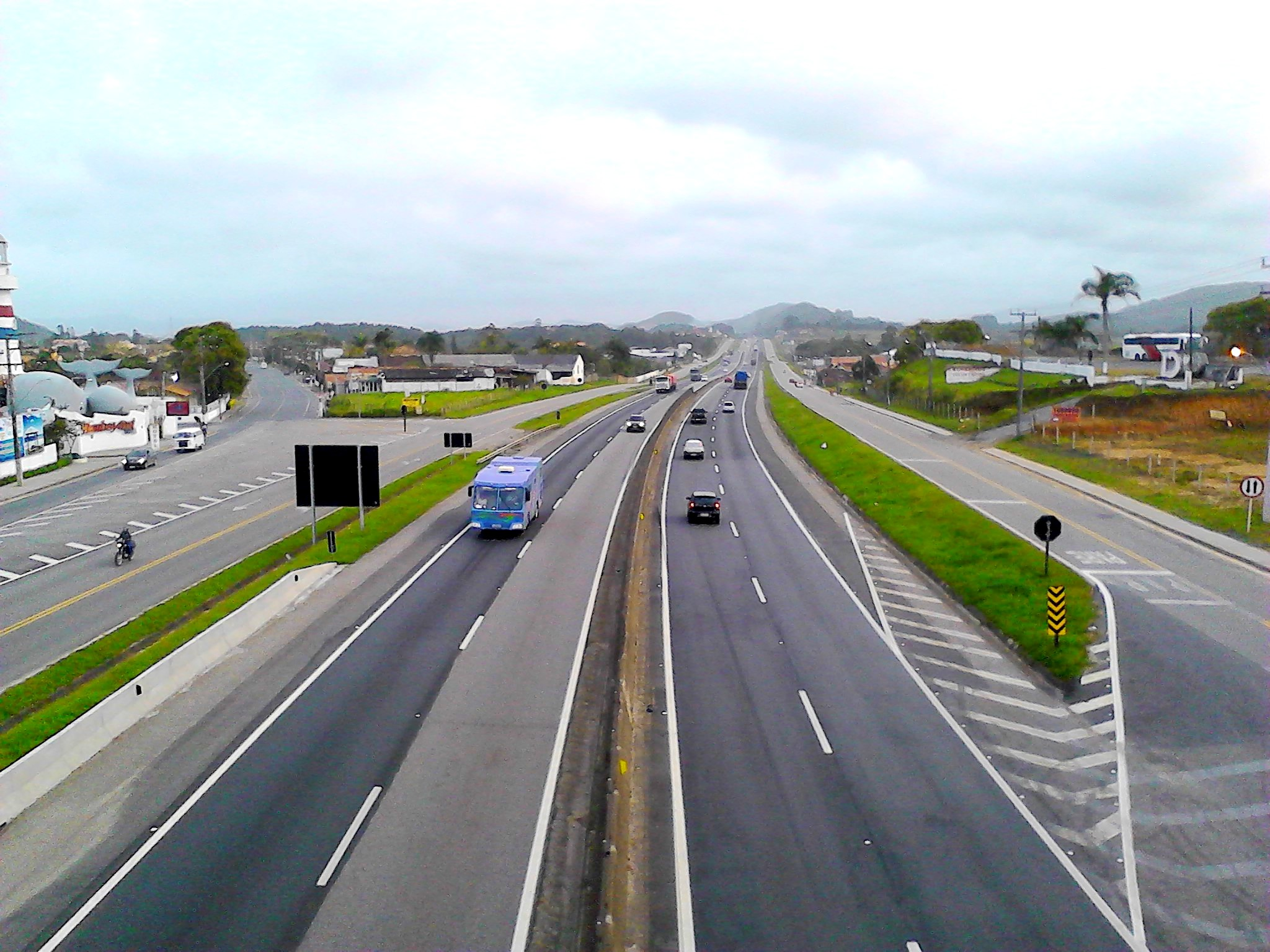
BR-101 in Santa Catarina.

BR-101 runs in a north–south way, along Brazil's eastern coast. It is Brazil's second major highway, and the longest in the country (nearly 4,800 km (2,983 mi) long). It connects more states capitals than any other "rodovia" in the country, in the total, 12 capitals are directly connected by BR-101. It's considered one of the most important highways in the country, along with BR-116: as it is a highway with a trans-coastal nature, it allows the connection between ports, major consumer centers and tourist areas. Used both by tourists who explore the coast, and for the transport of local and regional road loads such as those destined for or coming from ports and industries.

The Rio–Niterói Bridge is part of the BR-101.

Cities where the BR-101 runs or passes by: Natal, João Pessoa, Olinda, Recife, Maceió, Aracaju, Feira de Santana, Itabuna, Ilhéus, Porto Seguro, Linhares, Vitória, Guarapari, Niterói, Rio de Janeiro, Barra Mansa, Santos, Curitiba, Joinville, Florianópolis, Criciúma, Osório.

=== BR-116 ===
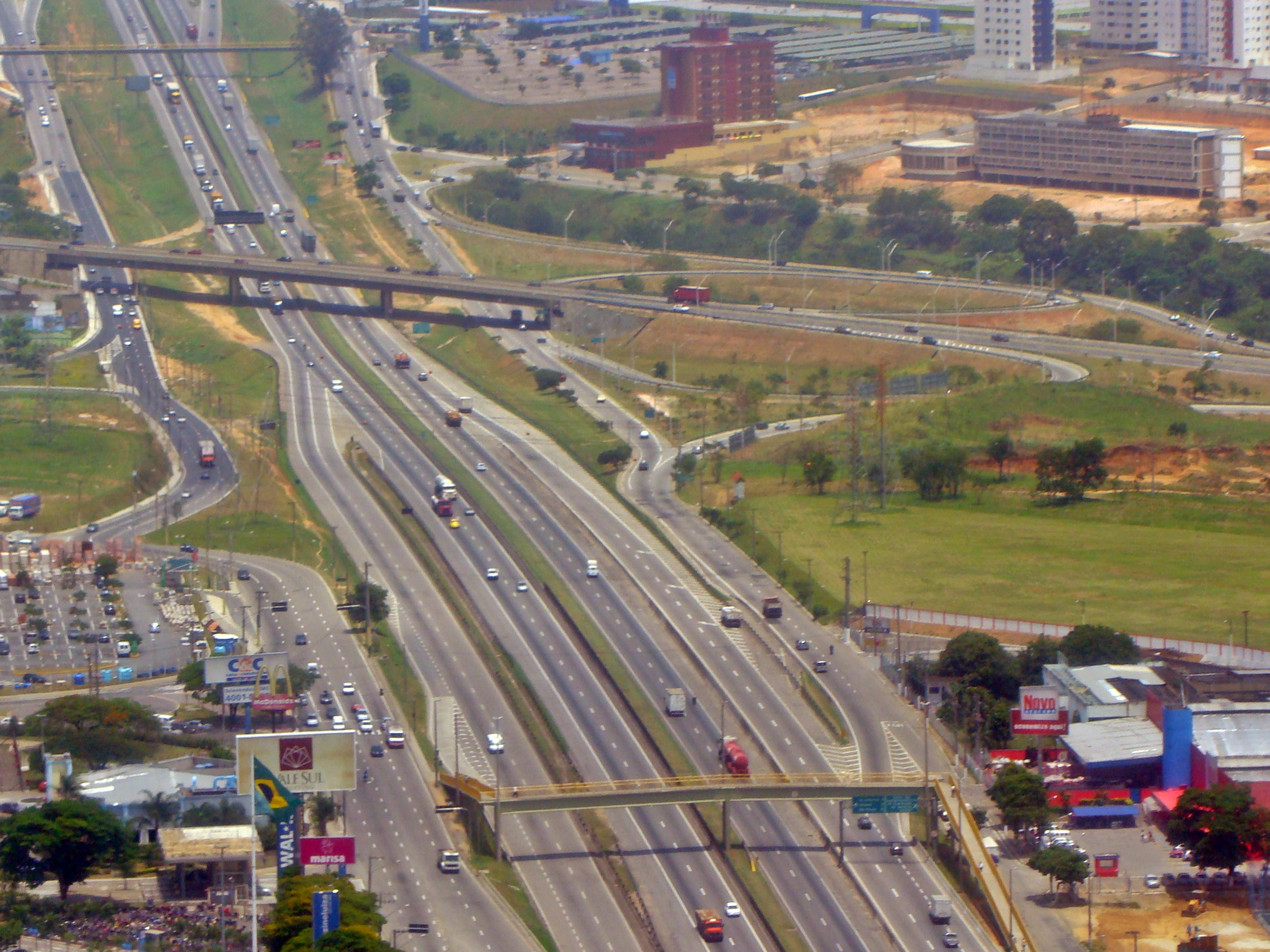
BR-116 near São José dos Campos.

BR-116 runs in a north–south way, near, but not on Brazil's coastline. It is considered one of the most important highways in the country, along with BR-101. It's also the second longest of the country, although, in practice, it is currently the one with the greatest extension built (4,486 km (2,787 mi)). The highway is one of the main connections for the transport of loads, receiving thousands of trucks every day. Numerous parts of the long path taken by the BR-116 have other official names, such as Régis Bittencourt, Presidente Dutra, Santos Dumont, among others.

Cities where the BR-116 runs or passes by: Fortaleza, Salgueiro, Feira de Santana, Vitória da Conquista, Teófilo Otoni, Governador Valadares, Rio de Janeiro, Volta Redonda, São José dos Campos, São Paulo, Curitiba, Lages, Caxias do Sul, Canoas, Porto Alegre, Pelotas.

=== BR-153 ===
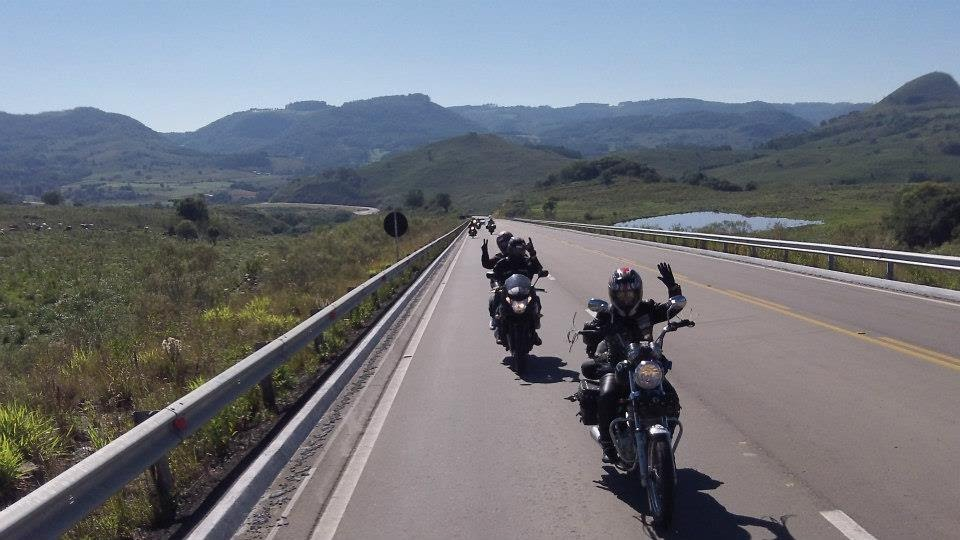
BR-153 in Herveiras, Rio Grande do Sul.

Also known as Transbrasiliana Highway, as Belém–Brasília Highway or even as Bernardo Sayão Highway, the BR-153 is one of the longest highways in South America and runs in the north–south direction, connecting the city of Marabá, in the state of Pará, and the city of Aceguá, in the boundary with Uruguay. It passes through the states of Pará, Tocantins, Goiás, Minas Gerais (Triângulo Mineiro region), São Paulo, Paraná, Santa Catarina and Rio Grande do Sul. The BR-153 is one of the main highways of the central region of Brazil, mainly in the states of Goiás and Tocantins, and also in the Triângulo Mineiro region. The highway works as an important channel for the flow of agricultural production (mainly soy, corn, sugar cane, cotton and tomato) and livestock (mainly beef and pork) in the Midwest, transports milk production from Minas Gerais and coffee from São Paulo, and agricultural products (rice, wheat, barley, soybeans, corn, grapes, apples, oats), livestock (chicken, pork, fish, and milk) and industrial (furniture, footwear, textiles, machinery, etc.) of the Southern region.

=== BR-277 ===
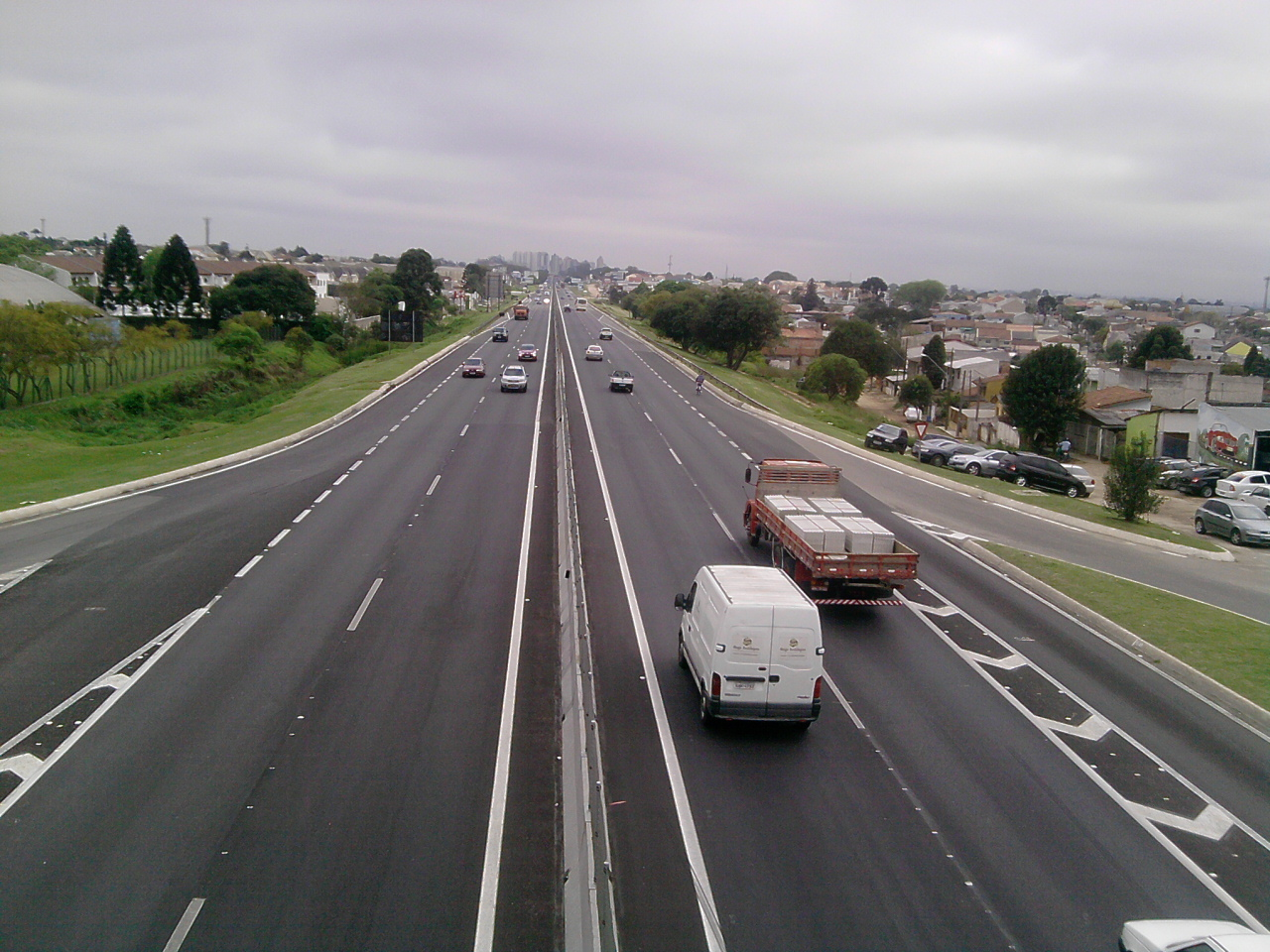
BR-277 in Paraná

BR-277 runs east–west, starting from the Friendship Bridge, which connects Brazilian city Foz do Iguaçu to Paraguayan Ciudad del Este, and going up to the port city of Paranaguá. It is approximately 650 km long. The highway is of great economic importance for both Brazil and Paraguay, as it connects the Brazil-Paraguay border to the Port of Paranaguá (which exits into the Atlantic Ocean).

It is one of the most important highways in the Southern Region of Brazil, as it connects Curitiba (the capital city of the state of Paraná and the third highest city GDP in Brazil) to the city of Paranaguá and to the international border city of Foz de Iguaçu, one of the most-frequented touristic destinations in Brazil (mainly due to border trade, to the presence of the Iguaçu Falls and the Itaipu Dam). In Paraná, there is a large production of soybeans, corn, chicken, milk, cellulose and fish, among other products, which are exported through the Port of Paranaguá (among other international connections).

For Paraguay, BR-277 is also of economical significance as it has a direct connection with Asunción through Route PY-02 and serves as an exit to the Atlantic Ocean. On the Brazil-Paraguay border there is intense trade between the two countries. and Paraguay uses the port to carry out part of its exports through the Atlantic Ocean.

Major Brazilian cities connected by BR-277 are Foz do Iguaçu, Medianeira, Cascavel, Guarapuava, Ponta Grossa, Curitiba, and Paranaguá.

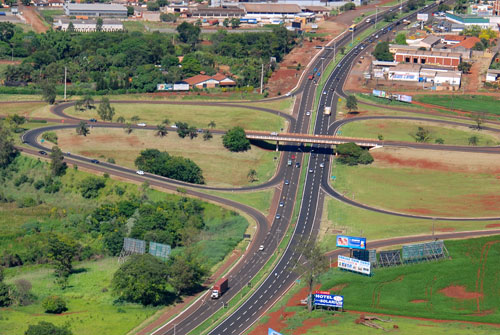
BR-369 between Cambé and Londrina, Paraná.

=== BR-369 ===
BR-369 begins in Oliveira, Minas Gerais and ends in Cascavel in the state of Paraná.

This highway is of extreme economical importance as it is used to transport products from agriculture, livestock and industry from the states of Paraná to São Paulo and vice versa - for example, soy, corn, coffee, beef, paper and cellulose, wood, furniture and other important products in the region. It also connects the western states of Paraná and São Paulo to Paraguay. Paraguay imports most of the products it consumes from Brazil (one of the main promoters of the Paraguayan economy). Therefore, trade and tourism with Paraguay are strong in the region. Foz do Iguaçu and Ciudad del Este benefit directly from the highway.

=== BR-376 ===
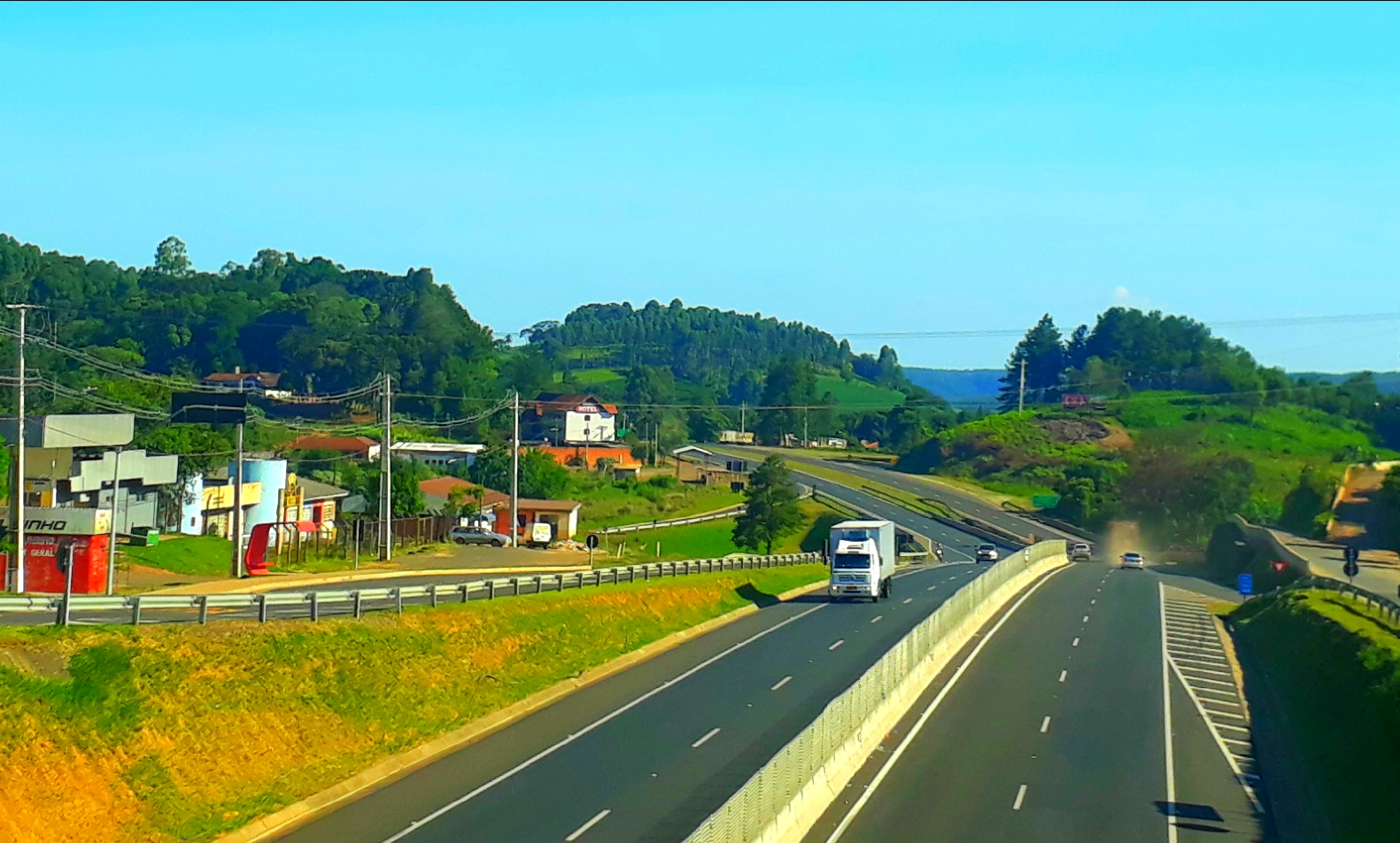
BR-376

The road connects the cities of Garuva, in the state of Santa Catarina, to Dourados, Mato Grosso do Sul. It has a length of 958,3 km. The road is very important to transport agricultural, livestock and industrial products from the states of Paraná and Mato Grosso do Sul. As some examples, we have soy, corn, coffee, beef, paper and cellulose, wood, furniture and other important products. in the region.

=== BR-386 ===
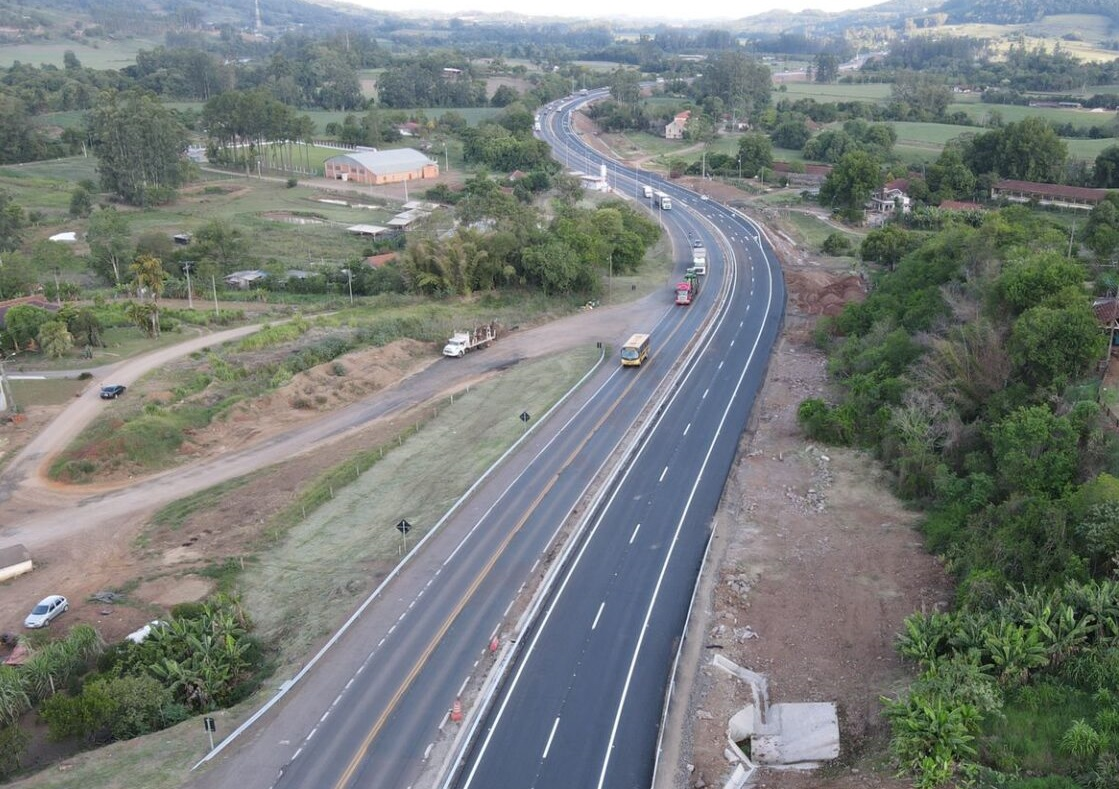
BR-386 in Lajeado.

This highway connects Canoas (in the metropolitan region of Porto Alegre, capital of the state of Rio Grande do Sul) with the municipality of Iraí (in the extreme northwest of the state, on the border with Santa Catarina).

It's called the Production Highway due to its high importance for the state. Through it all the production of soy, corn, wheat, meat, wood, furniture, among other products of the region is drained. In the city of Ametista do Sul, close to Iraí, there is the largest production of amethyst in the world. Close to Lajeado is one of the largest productions of tobacco on the planet. In Santa Catarina, the highway ends near Chapecó, the largest regional hub in the west of the state. In general, cities with significant GDP are on the side of the highway.

== Bibliography ==
- (in French) Michel Braudeau, « L'autoroute de l'amertume », in Le rêve amazonien, éditions Gallimard, 2004 (ISBN 2-07-077049-4).
