= BR-060 (Brazil highway) =

Highway in Brazil

BR-060

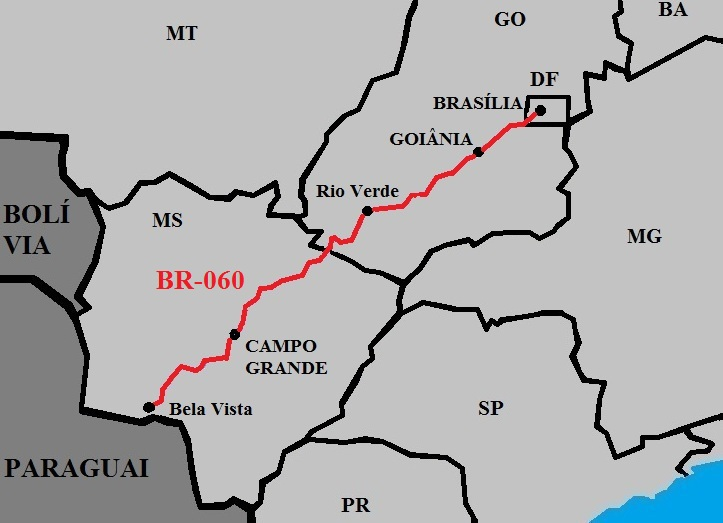

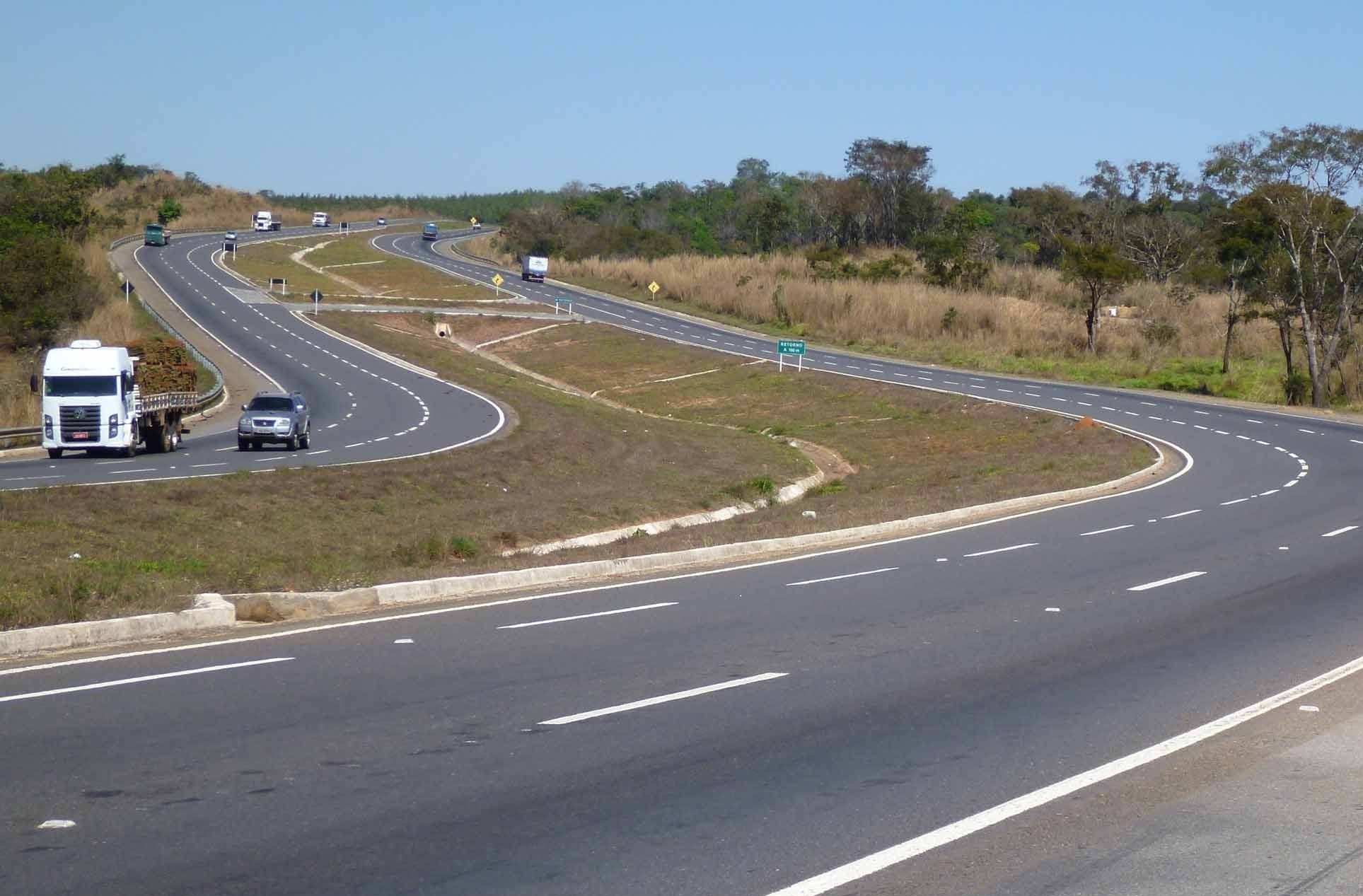

Route information
- Length: 1,329.3 km (826.0 mi)

Major junctions
- North end: Brasília, Distrito Federal
- South end: Bela Vista, Mato Grosso do Sul

Location
- Country: Brazil

Highway system
- Highways in Brazil; Federal

BR-060 is a federal highway of Brazil. The 1329 kilometre road connects Brasília to Bela Vista, on the Paraguayan border.

It is also designated as part of the Belém–Brasília Highway, in its stretch between Brasília and Anápolis.

== Duplication ==
In the Federal District and in the State of Goiás, the highway has 521 km duplicated, between Brasilia and Jataí. The section between Brasília and Goiânia fully doubled in 2007. The section between Goiânia and Jataí doubled in 2012.

== Economic Importance ==
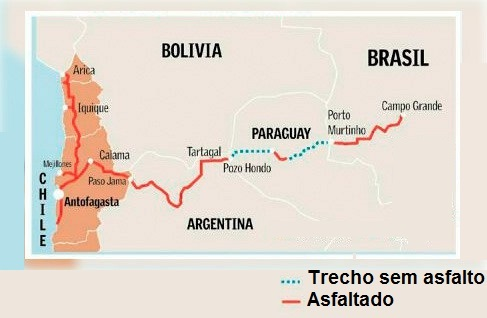
Bioceanic Corridor, the new road between Brazil, Paraguay, Argentina and Chile

The highway helps in the flow of agricultural production in the Center-West Region, which specializes in: soybeans, corn, sugarcane, tomatoes, beans, in the planting of eucalyptus for the production of cellulose and paper, and in cattle raising. Goiás and Mato Grosso do Sul also have considerable mineral exploration, producing a lot of iron ore, nickel and copper, in addition to gold, manganese and niobium. The BR-060 will in the future serve as a link with the Bioceanic Corridor that is being built with 3 other South American countries, connecting Campo Grande to Antofagasta, passing through Paraguay, northern Argentina and northern Chile.

The highway is also of tourist importance, as it connects to Pantanal, the largest wetland in the world, and Bonito, an important Brazilian tourist city.
