= Santa Maria do Pará =

Coordinates: 1°21′S 47°34′W

- Municipality
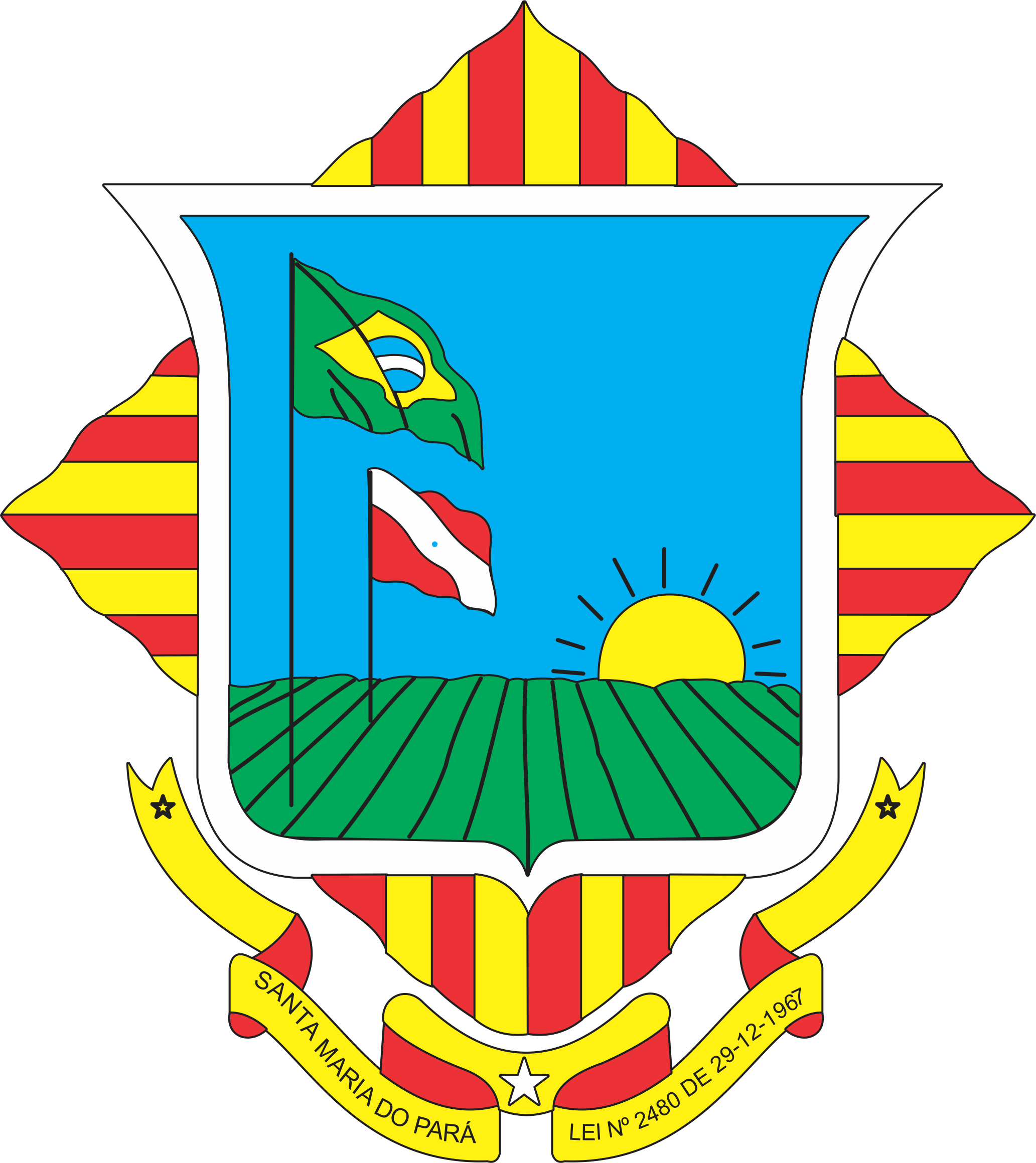
- Coat of arms
- Interactive map of Santa Maria do Pará
- Country: Brazil
- Region: Northern
- State: Pará
- Mesoregion: Nordeste Paraense

Population (2020)
  - Total: 24,995
- Time zone: UTC−3 (BRT)

Santa Maria do Pará is a municipality in the state of Pará in the Northern region of Brazil.

== See also ==
- List of municipalities in Pará
