= Lasiancistrus saetiger =

Conservation status
- Data Deficient (IUCN 3.1)

Scientific classification
- Kingdom: Animalia
- Phylum: Chordata
- Class: Actinopterygii
- Order: Siluriformes
- Family: Loricariidae
- Subfamily: Hypostominae
- Genus: Lasiancistrus
- Species: L. saetiger

Binomial name
- Lasiancistrus saetiger Armbruster, 2005

Species of fish

Lasiancistrus saetiger is a species of freshwater ray-finned fish belonging to the family Loricariidae, the suckermouth armoured catfishes, and the subfamily Hypostominae, the suckermouth catfishes. This catfish is endemic to Brazil where it is known only from the Guamá River, a tributary of the Capim River on the state of Pará. This sepceis reaches a standard lengthof 10 cm (3.9 in). The International Union for Conservation of Nature has assessed L. seateiger as Data Deficient as it is only know from its type material which was collected by a fisherman collecting live fish for the aquarium trade, there have been no records of this taxon since.
