= Serra do Tiracambu =

The Serra do Tiracambu is a mountain range in Maranhão state of north-central Brazil. The range runs north and south, and forms the divide between the basins of the Gurupí River to the west and the Pindaré River to the east.

The range lies within the Tocantins–Araguaia–Maranhão moist forests ecoregion of the Amazon biome, and is covered by tropical moist broadleaf forest.
