= P. tigris =

P. tigris may refer to:

- Panthera tigris, a mammal species
- Phidippus tigris, a spider species in the genus Phidippus
- Pseudolithoxus tigris, a catfish species
- Python tigris, a python species

== See also ==
- Tigris (disambiguation)
