= Pseudolithoxus =

Scientific classification
- Kingdom: Animalia
- Phylum: Chordata
- Class: Actinopterygii
- Division: Teleostei
- Order: Siluriformes
- Family: Loricariidae
- Subfamily: Hypostominae
- Genus: Pseudolithoxus; Isbrücker & Werner, 2001

Type species
- Lasiancistrus tigris Armbruster & Provenzano, 2000

Synonyms
- Soromonichthys Lujan & Armbruster, 2011

Genus of fishes

Pseudolithoxus is a genus of freshwater ray-finned fishes belonging to the family Loricariidae, the suckermouth armored catfishes, and the subfamily Hypostominae, the suckermouth catfishes. The catfishes on this genus are found in South America.

== Taxonomy ==
The species group was originally described in 2000 and the four species to be included in the genus were temporarily placed in Lasiancistrus. In 2001, the genus Pseudolithoxus was erected for these species. This group forms a monophyletic sister group to Lasiancistrus and Ancistrus. P. anthrax and P. nicoi likely represent sister species. In 2011, P. kelsorum was described based on type material from Venezuela. Some authorities regard this genus as being within the tribe Ancistrini of the subfamily Hypostominae, but Eschmeyer's Catalog of Fishes does not recognise tribes within the subfamily Hypostominae.

== Species ==
Pseudolithoxus contains the following valid species:

- Pseudolithoxus anthrax (Armbruster & Provenzano, 2000)
- Pseudolithoxus dumus (Armbruster & Provenzano, 2000)
- Pseudolithoxus kelsorum Lujan & Birindelli, 2011
- Pseudolithoxus kinja Bifi, de Oliveira, Rapp Py-Daniel & Collins, 2018
- Pseudolithoxus nicoi (Armbruster & Provenzano, 2000)
- Pseudolithoxus stearleyi (Lujan & Armbruster, 2011)
- Pseudolithoxus tigris (Armbruster & Provenzano, 2000)

== Description ==
The largest Pseudolithoxus species reach up to 12.4 cm (4.9 in) in standard length. The genus is characterized by evertible cheek plates, a very dorsoventrally flattened body, extremely hypertrophied odontodes (integumentary teeth) on elongated pectoral spines and along the snout margin, and 3 rows of plates on the caudal peduncle. In addition, it appears as if females as well as males develop hypertrophied snout and pectoral-fin odontodes, traits normally restricted to nuptial males in other loricariids.

Pseudolithoxus species may be differentiated based on colouration. Two species are black, usually with white spots, and lack dark bands on the caudal fin; P. nicoi has a white band at the distal margin of the caudal fin, while P. anthrax does not. P. dumus has a colour pattern consisting of black spots on the head and anterior part of body, while P. tigris has a colour pattern consisting of brown and tan bars on the head and anterior part of body. However, P. dumus and P. tigris may actually both represent more species. In P. dumus, specimens from northern Amazonas have a well-spotted caudal peduncle, those from the Ventuari and Cataniapo Rivers have spots along the mid-line on the caudal peduncle, and those from the Casiquiare have spots combining to form bands on the caudal peduncle. In some P. tigris, though specimens have similar colour patterns, they may differ in thickness of the tan bars and dark bars, body depth, and eye position.

The body of these fish is very dorsoventrally flattened with both ventral- and dorsal-surface flat. The dorsal fin spine is weak, and the dorsal fin spinelet supports odontodes. The pectoral fins are usually elongated, reaching the anus in juveniles and growing to the anal fins in the adults; P. anthrax has been referred to as "flying catfish", probably due to these long pectoral fins in adults. The caudal fin is weakly forked, with the lower lobe longer than the upper. The eyes are mostly dorsal. The abdomen is without plates.

== Distribution ==
Pseudolithoxus catfishes are found in northern South America, mainly in the Orinoco drainage of Colombia and Venezuela but also in the Rio Negro and in streams draining the Guiana Shield in the Brazilian state of Amazonas.
