= Pseudolithoxus kelsorum =

Conservation status
- Endangered (IUCN 3.1)

Scientific classification
- Kingdom: Animalia
- Phylum: Chordata
- Class: Actinopterygii
- Division: Teleostei
- Order: Siluriformes
- Family: Loricariidae
- Genus: Pseudolithoxus
- Species: P. kelsorum

Binomial name
- Pseudolithoxus kelsorum Lujan & Birindelli, 2011

Species of catfish

Pseudolithoxus kelsorum is a species of freshwater ray-finned fish belonging to the family Loricariidae, the suckermouth armoured catfishes, and the subfamily Hypostominae, the suckermouth catfishes. This species is known only from a single granite outcrop in the Orinoco in Venezuela, just south of Puerto Nariño in Colombia. This species reaches a standard length of 6.6 cm (2.6 in).

The specific name honours the donors to Texas A&M University and to the Winemiller Aquatic Ecology Lab, George and Carlyn Kelso, whose donations helped fund important ichthyological discoveries, including that of this species.

P. kelsorum appears in the aquarium trade, where it is usually referred to either as the banded pancake pleco (presumably referencing its patterning and its dorsoventrally flattened shape) or by its associated L-number, which is L-189.
