= Lasiancistrus guacharote =

Conservation status
- Least Concern (IUCN 3.1)

Scientific classification
- Kingdom: Animalia
- Phylum: Chordata
- Class: Actinopterygii
- Division: Teleostei
- Order: Siluriformes
- Family: Loricariidae
- Genus: Lasiancistrus
- Species: L. guacharote

Binomial name
- Lasiancistrus guacharote (Valenciennes, 1840)

Synonyms
- Hypostomus guacharote Valenciennes, 1840; Guyanancistrus guacharote (Valenciennes 1840); Ancistrus mystacinus Kner, 1854; Lasiancistrus maracaiboensis Schultz, 1944

Species of fish

Lasiancistrus guacharote is a species of freshwater ray-finned fish belonging to the family Loricariidae, the suckermouth armoured catfishes, and the subfamily Hypostominae, the suckermouth catfishes. This catfish is found in the drainage basin of Lake Maracaibo in Columbia and Venezuela. This species reaches a standard length of 12 cm (4.7 in).
