= Lasiancistrus heteracanthus =

Conservation status
- Least Concern (IUCN 3.1)

Scientific classification
- Kingdom: Animalia
- Phylum: Chordata
- Class: Actinopterygii
- Order: Siluriformes
- Family: Loricariidae
- Subfamily: Hypostominae
- Genus: Lasiancistrus
- Species: L. heteracanthus

Binomial name
- Lasiancistrus heteracanthus (Günther, 1869)

Synonyms
- Chaetostomus heteracanthus Günther, 1869

Species of fish

Lasiancistrus heteracanthus is a species of freshwater ray-finned fish belonging to the family Loricariidae, the suckermouth armoured catfishes, and the subfamily Hypostominae, the suckermouth catfishes. This species was designated as the type species of the genus Lasiancistrus, originally proposed in 1904 by Charles Tate Regan, by Carl H. Eigenmann in 1910. This catfish is found in the Napo-Pastaza and Chinchipe drainages in Ecuador and in the upper Amazon basin in Peru. L. heteracanthus reaches a standard length of 15.3 cm (6.0 in).
