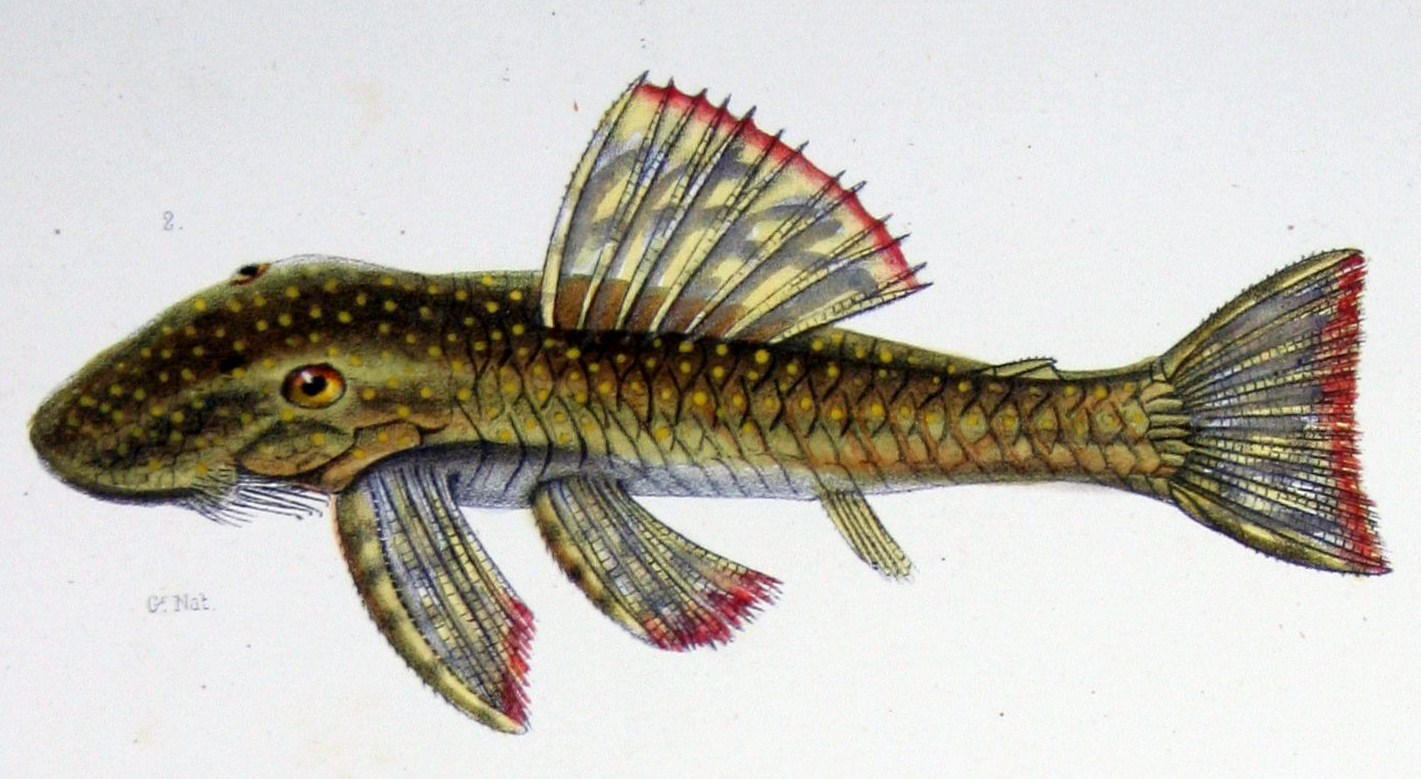

Conservation status
- Least Concern (IUCN 3.1)

Scientific classification
- Kingdom: Animalia
- Phylum: Chordata
- Class: Actinopterygii
- Order: Siluriformes
- Family: Loricariidae
- Subfamily: Hypostominae
- Genus: Lasiancistrus
- Species: L. schomburgkii

Binomial name
- Lasiancistrus schomburgkii (Günther, 1864)

Synonyms
- Chaetostomus schomburgkii Günther, 1864; Chaetostoma schomburgkii Günther, 1864; Guyanancistrus schomburgkii (Günther 1864); Pseudancistrus schomburgkii (Günther 1864); Hypostomus pictus Castelnau, 1855; Hemiancistrus castelnaui A. Miranda-Ribeiro, 1911; Lasiancistrus castelnaui (A. Miranda Ribeiro, 1911); Hemiancistrus caquetae Fowler, 1945; Peckoltia caquetae (Fowler, 1945); Lasiancistrus caquetae (Fowler, 1945); Lasiancistrus scolymus Nijssen & Isbrücker, 1985; Lasiancistrus guapore Knaack, 2000

= Lasiancistrus schomburgkii =

Species of fish

Lasiancistrus schomburgkii is a species of freshwater ray-finned fish belonging to the family Loricariidae, the suckermouth armoured catfishes, and the subfamily Hypostominae, the suckermouth catfishes. This species has a wide distribution in the Amazon basin, as well as the upper Orinoco and Essequibo basins, it has been recorded from Bolivia Brazil, Colombia, Ecuador, Guyana, Peru and Venezuela. The Specific name, schomburgkii, honours the German explorer Robert Hermann Schomburgk, who gave the holotype to the British Museum (Natural History). This catfish reaches a standard length of 14.4 cm (5.7 in).
