= Pseudolithoxus stearleyi =

Conservation status
- Data Deficient (IUCN 3.1)

Scientific classification
- Kingdom: Animalia
- Phylum: Chordata
- Class: Actinopterygii
- Division: Teleostei
- Order: Siluriformes
- Family: Loricariidae
- Subfamily: Hypostominae
- Genus: Pseudolithoxus
- Species: P. stearleyi

Binomial name
- Pseudolithoxus stearleyi (Lujan & Armbruster, 2011)

Synonyms
- Soromonichthys stearleyi Lujan & Armbruster, 2011

Species of fish

Pseudolithoxus stearleyi is a species of freshwater ray-finned fish belonging to the family Loricariidae, the suckermouth armoured catfishes, and the subfamily Hypostominae, the suckermouth catfishes. This catfish is endemic to Venezuela where it is known only from the Soromoni Creek in the upper Orinoco, this sream flows off the Guiana Shield. This species grows to a standard length of 3 cm (1.2 in). The specific name honours Ralph Stearley, Professor of Geology at Calvin College who introduced Nathan K. Lujan to fish osteology and set him on his career.
