= Pseudolithoxus dumus =

Conservation status
- Least Concern (IUCN 3.1)

Scientific classification
- Kingdom: Animalia
- Phylum: Chordata
- Class: Actinopterygii
- Division: Teleostei
- Order: Siluriformes
- Family: Loricariidae
- Genus: Pseudolithoxus
- Species: P. dumus

Binomial name
- Pseudolithoxus dumus (Armbruster & Provenzano, 2000)

Synonyms
- Lasiancistrus dumus Armbuster & Provenzano, 2000

Species of fish

Pseudolithoxus dumus is a species of freshwater ray-finned fish belonging to the family Loricariidae, the suckermouth armoured catfishes, and the subfamily Hypostominae, the suckermouth catfishes. This catfish is found in Colombia and Venezuela where it occurs in the upper Orinoco, including the Ventuari and Ocamo rivers, as well as some separate localities near Puerto Ayacucho in Amazonas in Venezuela. This species grows to a standard length of 10.1 cm (4.0 in).
