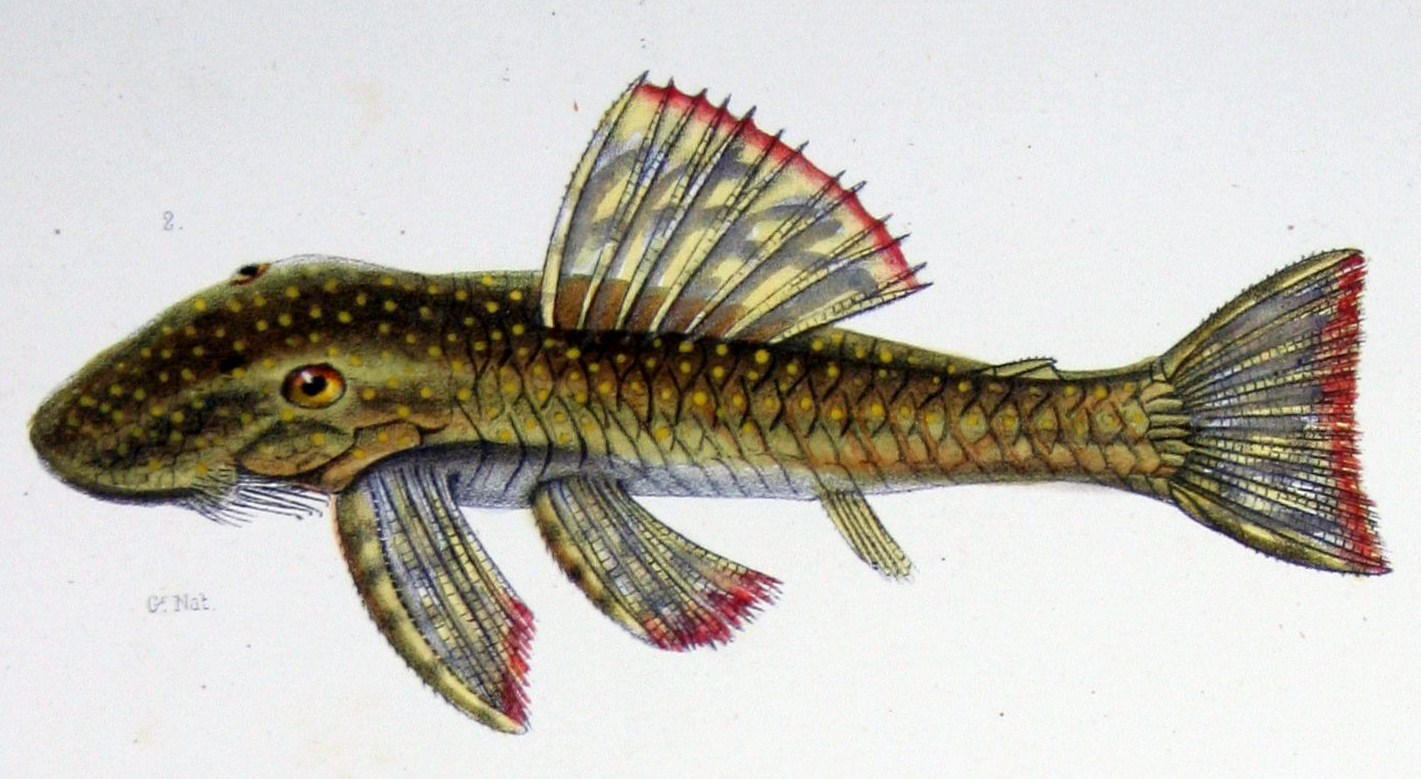
- Lasiancistrus schomburgkii

Scientific classification
- Kingdom: Animalia
- Phylum: Chordata
- Class: Actinopterygii
- Order: Siluriformes
- Family: Loricariidae
- Subfamily: Hypostominae
- Genus: Lasiancistrus; Regan, 1904

Type species
- Chaetostomus heteracanthus Günther, 1869

= Lasiancistrus =

Genus of fishes

Lasiancistrus is a genus of freshwater ray-finned fish belonging to the family Loricariidae, the suckermouth armoured catfishes, and the subfamily Hypostominae, the suckermouth catfishes. The catfishes in this genus are found in southern Central America and South America.

== Taxonomy ==
Lasiancistrus was first proposed as a subgenus of Ancistrus in 1904 by the British ichthyologist Charles Tate Regan with Chaetostomus heteracanthus designated as the type species in 1910 by Carl H. Eigenmann. Regan also included, A. pictus, A. mystacinus, and A. guacharote. Later, it was raised to genus level, and several unrelated species were included. Many of these species have since been moved to other genera, such as Pseudolithoxus. Most Lasiancistrus species had been described from few specimens; the genus was revised in 2005, synonymizing many of the existing species into four species, L. caucanus, L. guacharote, L. heteracanthus, and L. schomburgkii. L. maracaiboensis and L. mystacinus are synonyms of L. guacharote. L. castelnaui, L. caquetae, L. guapore, L. multispinis, L. pictus, and L. scolymus are synonyms of L. schomburgkii. L. planiceps, L. mayoloi, and L. volcanensis were synonyms of L. caucanus. In addition, two new species, L. saetiger and L. tentaculatus, were described. Later, in 2023, a new species L. wiwa was described, L. mayoloi, and L. volcanensis were resurrected and L. planiceps was synonymized with L. mayoloi.

Some authorities regard this genus as being within the tribe Ancistrini of the subfamily Hypostominae, but Eschmeyer's Catalog of Fishes does not recognise tribes within the subfamily Hypostominae.

== Species ==
Lasiancistrus has the following valid species classified within it:

- Lasiancistrus caucanus C. H. Eigenmann, 1912
- Lasiancistrus diazi Ardila Rodríguez, 2026
- Lasiancistrus guacharote (Valenciennes, 1840)
- Lasiancistrus heteracanthus (Günther, 1869)
- Lasiancistrus mayoloi (C. H. Eigenmann, 1912)
- Lasiancistrus ruitoquensis Ardila Rodríguez, 2025
- Lasiancistrus saetiger Armbruster, 2005
- Lasiancistrus schomburgkii (Günther, 1864)
- Lasiancistrus tentaculatus Armbruster, 2005
- Lasiancistrus volcanensis Dahl, 1941
- Lasiancistrus wiwa Poveda-Cuellar, Conde-Saldaña, Villa-Navarro, Lujan & Santos 2023

== Distribution and habitat ==
Unlike many other members of Ancistrini, the ranges of most of the Lasiancistrus species are quite broad. Lasiancistrus species are found throughout the Amazon basin, the upper and middle of the Orinoco River basin, the Rupununi River basin (Essequibo River drainage), the Lake Maracaibo drainage, and drainages west of the Andes in Colombia and Panama to the Bayano River.

The species of Lasiancistrus are most commonly found in small creeks, typically in swift flow. However, some of the streams where Lasiancistrus can be found are in the lowlands, and hypoxia has been observed in one such stream, suggesting that lowlands are not a barrier to the movement of these species. Lasiancistrus are most common in lower piedmont streams and are more likely to spread between rivers this way rather than through the lowlands.

== Description ==
Adult Lasiancistrus have whiskerlike odontodes on their cheeks which are unique among the Loricariidae. These hair-like odontodes are part of their evertible cheek odontodes; they are very narrow, but appear to be made out of the same material as the other odontodes. Their presence does not appear to be sexually dimorphic, although males may have longer ones. In nuptial males, there are fleshy tentacles on the pectoral-fin spines longer than their associated odontodes, which differentiates it from all genera except Ancistrus. They are differentiated from Ancistrus by the presence of plates along the edge of the snout (Ancistrus lack these plates) and by maximally having translucent tentacles on the snout that have odontodes associated with them (in Ancistrus there are larger tentacles without associated odontodes coloured the same as the head).

The snout of nuptial males are almost square, rather than rounded as in females and juveniles. Adult males of most species (except L. tentaculatus) have whiskerlike odontodes at anterolateral corner of snout; in L. tentaculatus, males have tentacles instead of whiskerlike odontodes along anterior margin of snout. Also, nuptial males with tentacles longer than their associated odontodes on the pectoral-fin spine.

Lasiancistrus species are medium-sized loricariids, with the largest being about 19.0 centimetres (7.5 in) SL. The body is strongly dorsoventrally compressed and moderately wide. The head and nape are gently sloped to the insertion of the dorsal fin. The ventral surface of the fish is flat. The head contours are smooth. The eyes are small to medium. The caudal fin is slightly emarginate to forked, with the lower lobe longer than the upper lobe. The dorsal flap of the iris is present. The lips are wide and fairly thin; the upper lip has small, round papillae and the lower lip has medium-sized papillae anteriorly and smaller ones posteriorly.

No morphometric, meristic, or skeletal differences could be found among the species of Lasiancistrus. The only differences between the species are the degree of abdominal plating (itself a characteristic that is likely to be very homoplastic) and coloration. L. schomburgkii has a body and fins with small white spots less than half the diameter of the plates (although spots may be faded); its plates are entirely dark or with small spots. L. saetiger has a body and paired fins with large white spots almost the same size as the plates, with the dorsal fin without spots; its plates are outlined in black. In the rest of the species, the dorsal fin is with black spots, the body is with dark markings and light markings, if present, are usually present as blotches or thick lines (except in the Bayano River population in Panama of L. caucanus); the body is never completely dark. In L. caucanus and L. tentaculatus, the abdomen lacks plates; between these two species, L. caucanus has whiskerlike odontodes on the corners of the snout in nuptial males and an emarginate caudal fin, while L. tentaculatus has tentacles along the anterior margin of the snout in nuptial males and a forked caudal fin. In the remaining two species, the abdomen has plates in at least a small patch medial to the insertion of the pectoral-fin spines; in L. heteracanthus, the abdomen has plates underneath entire pectoral girdle and on the abdomen, while in L. guacharote, the abdomen has only a couple of plates medial to insertion of pectoral-fin spines.
