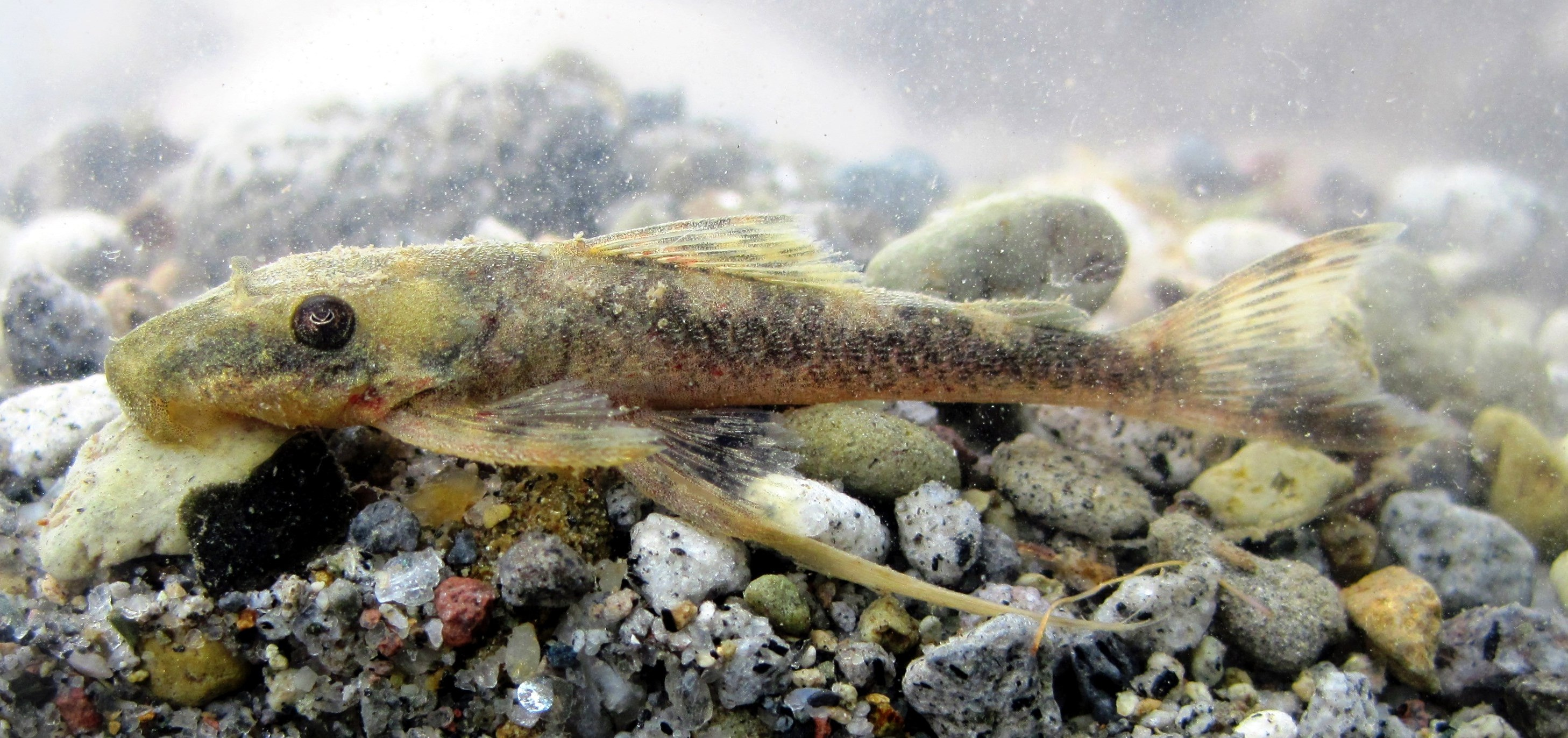

Conservation status
- Least Concern (IUCN 3.1)

Scientific classification
- Kingdom: Animalia
- Phylum: Chordata
- Class: Actinopterygii
- Order: Siluriformes
- Family: Loricariidae
- Subfamily: Hypostominae
- Genus: Lasiancistrus
- Species: L. caucanus

Binomial name
- Lasiancistrus caucanus C. H. Eigenmann, 1912

= Lasiancistrus caucanus =

Species of fish

Lasiancistrus caucanus is a species of freshwater ray-finned fish belonging to the family Loricariidae, the suckermouth armoured catfishes, and the subfamily Hypostominae, the suckermouth catfishes. This catfish is found on both the Atlantic and Pacific slopes of eastern Panama and Colombia. This species reaches a standard length of 23.5 cm (9.3 in).
