= Pindaré River =

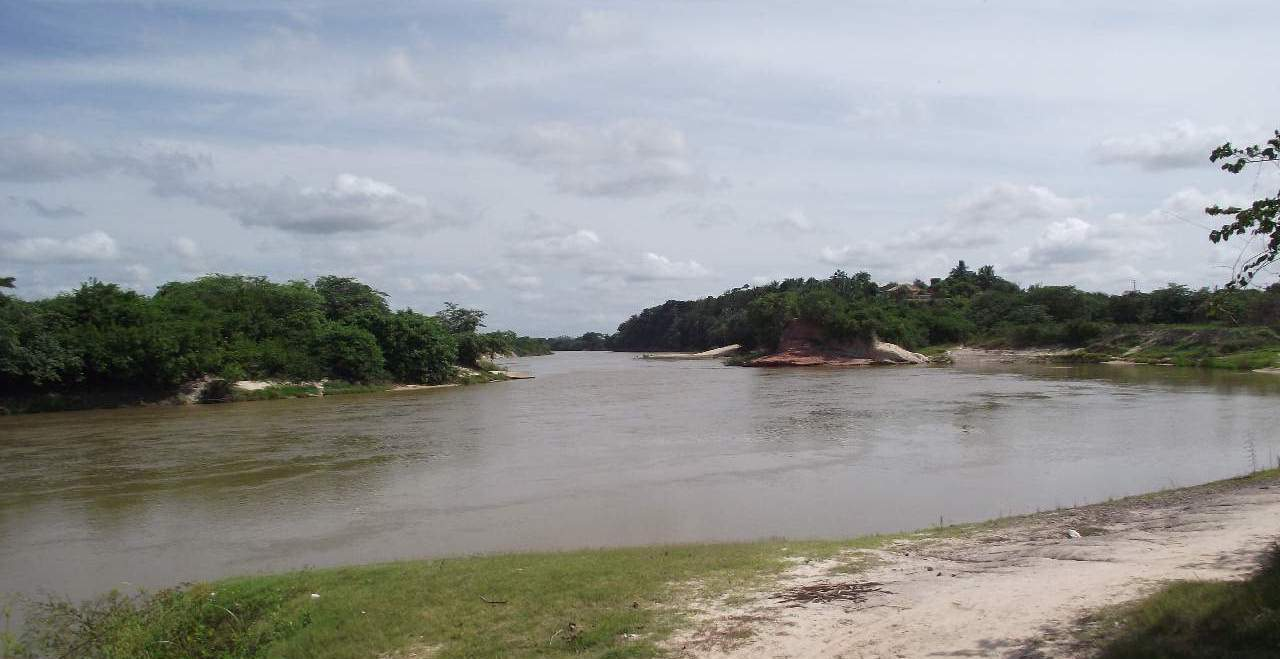

- Location within Brazil
- Native name: Rio Pindaré (Portuguese)

Location
- Country: Brazil

Physical characteristics
- Source
  - location: Maranhão
- Mouth
  - coordinates: 3.288371°S 44.795266°W

The Pindaré River is a river in Maranhão state of north-central Brazil.

The Pindaré rises in the low hills which separate its basin from that of the Tocantins River to the south. In its lower reaches it is called the Pindaré-Mirim. It is a left tributary of the Mearim River, which it joins not far from that river's mouth in the Baía de São Marcos. The Serra do Tiracambu lies to the west, and separates the basin of the Pindaré from that of the Gurupí River.

Part of the river's basin lies in the 271,197 hectares (670,140 acres) Gurupi Biological Reserve, a full protected conservation unit created in 1988. Average annual rainfall is 2,169 millimetres (85.4 in). Temperatures range from 22 to 32 °C (72 to 90 °F) with an average of 27 °C (81 °F). The Pindaré basin is home to tropical moist broadleaf forest, and the river divides the Tocantins–Araguaia–Maranhão moist forests to the west from the Maranhão Babaçu forests to the east.
