= Capim River =

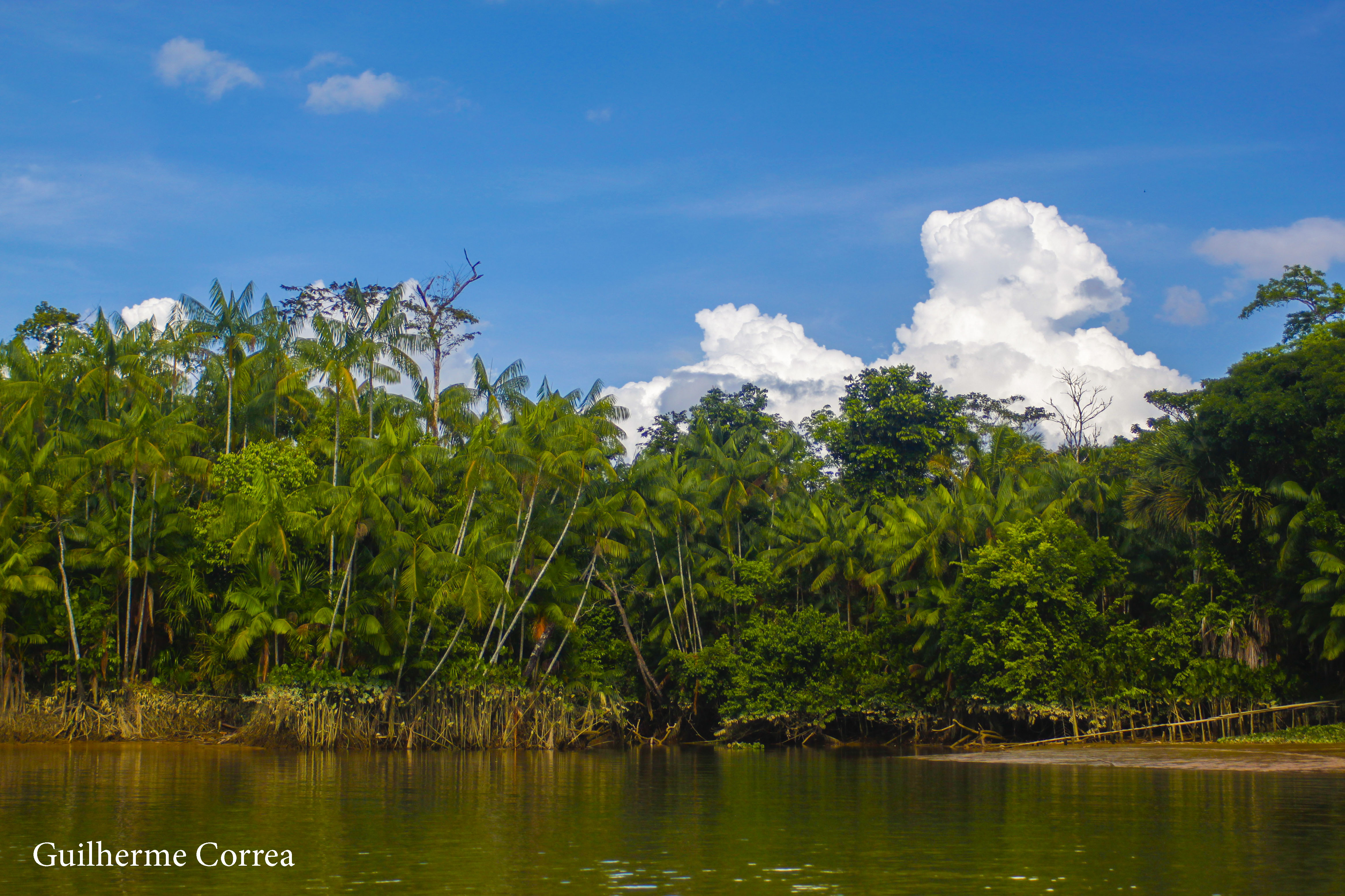

- Mouth location in Brazil
- Native name: Rio Capim (Portuguese)

Location
- Country: Brazil

Physical characteristics
- Mouth
  - coordinates: 1°40′40″S 47°47′36″W
- Length: 820 kilometres (510 mi)

Basin features
- River system: Guamá River

The Capim River (Portuguese: Rio Capim) is a river in the state of Pará, Brazil. It is a tributary of the Guamá River.

The Gurupí, Capim and Guamá rivers flow into the mouth of the Amazon and are affected by the daily tides, which force water from the Amazon upstream. They are in the Tocantins–Araguaia–Maranhão moist forests ecoregion.

== Sources ==
- Sears, Robin, South America: Eastern extreme of the Amazon basin in Brazil (NT0170), WWF: World Wildlife Fund
- Ziesler, R.; Ardizzone, G.D. (1979), "Amazon River System", The Inland waters of Latin America, Food and Agriculture Organization of the United Nations, ISBN 92-5-000780-9, archived from the original on 21 October 2013
