= Pseudolithoxus nicoi =

Conservation status
- Least Concern (IUCN 3.1)

Scientific classification
- Kingdom: Animalia
- Phylum: Chordata
- Class: Actinopterygii
- Division: Teleostei
- Order: Siluriformes
- Family: Loricariidae
- Genus: Pseudolithoxus
- Species: P. nicoi

Binomial name
- Pseudolithoxus nicoi (Armbruster & Provenzano, 2000)

Species of fish

Pseudolithoxus nicoi is a species of freshwater ray-finned fish belonging to the family Loricariidae, the suckermouth armoured catfishes, and the subfamily Hypostominae, the suckermouth catfishes. This catfish is found in the Siapa River, a tributary of the Casiquiare canal, in Venezuela. The region where it is found is difficult to access and this species probably also occurs elsewhere in the Rio Negro basin and its range may extend into Brazil. This species grows to a standard length of 11.4 cm (4.5 in). The specific name honours Dr Leo G. Nico, an ichthyologist at the United States Geological Survey who collected most of the specimens.
