= Pseudolithoxus anthrax =

Conservation status
- Near Threatened (IUCN 3.1)

Scientific classification
- Kingdom: Animalia
- Phylum: Chordata
- Class: Actinopterygii
- Division: Teleostei
- Order: Siluriformes
- Family: Loricariidae
- Genus: Pseudolithoxus
- Species: P. anthrax

Binomial name
- Pseudolithoxus anthrax (Armbruster & Provenzano, 2000)

Species of fish

Pseudolithoxus anthrax is a species of freshwater ray-finned fish belonging to the family Loricariidae, the suckermouth armoured catfishes, and the subfamily Hypostominae, the suckermouth catfishes. This catfish is endemic to Venezuela where has a wide distribution in the rivers flowing off the Guiana Shield in the Orinoco basin, including the Aro, Caura, Suapure, Caroní and Atabapo in Bolivar and Amazonas, as well as the Cuyuní River system in southern Venezuela. This species grows to a standard length of 12.4 cm (4.9 in).
