= Maranhão Babaçu forests =

Ecoregion in Brazil

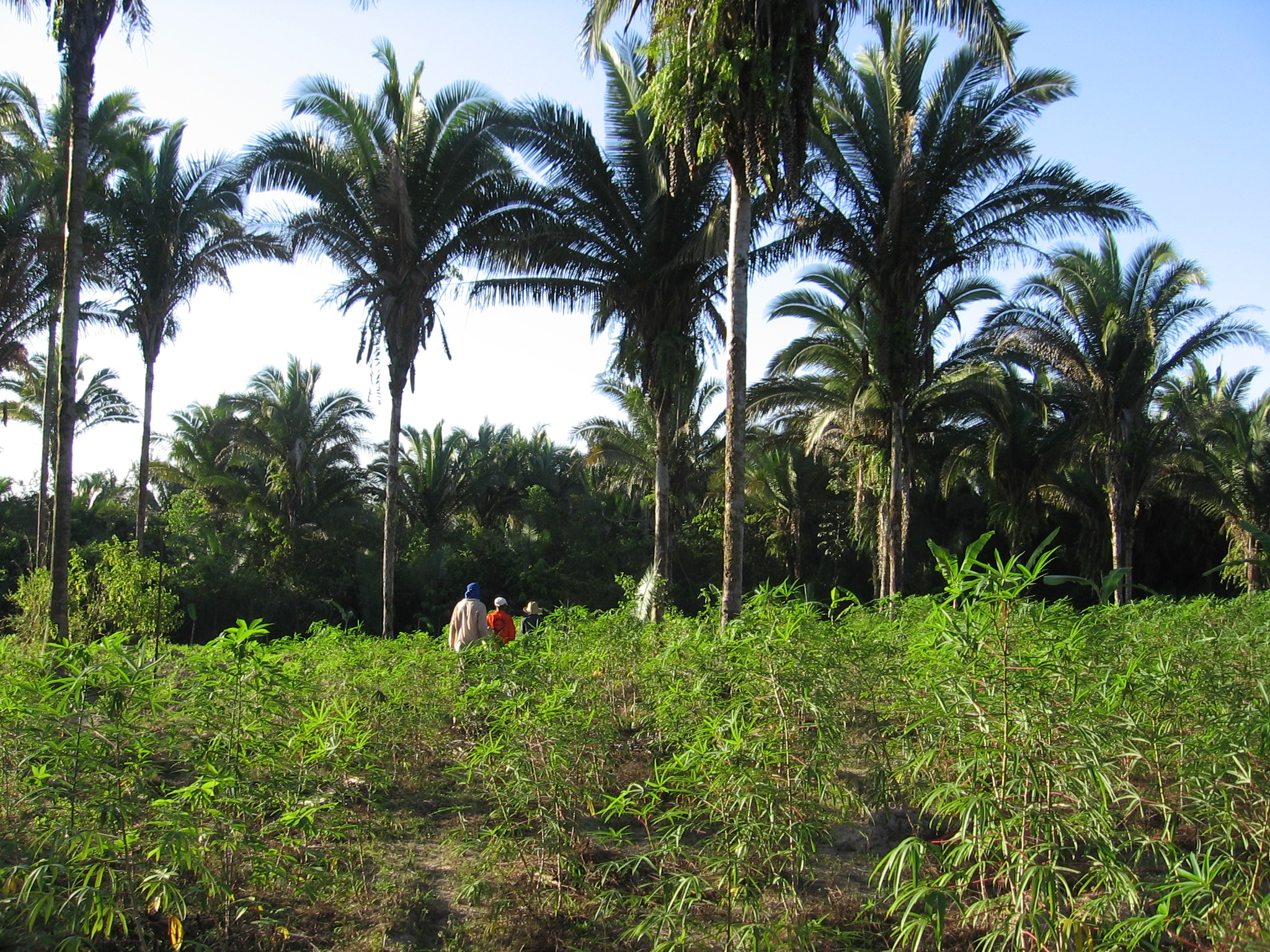
- Babaçu palms in Itapecuru-mirim city, in Maranhão state

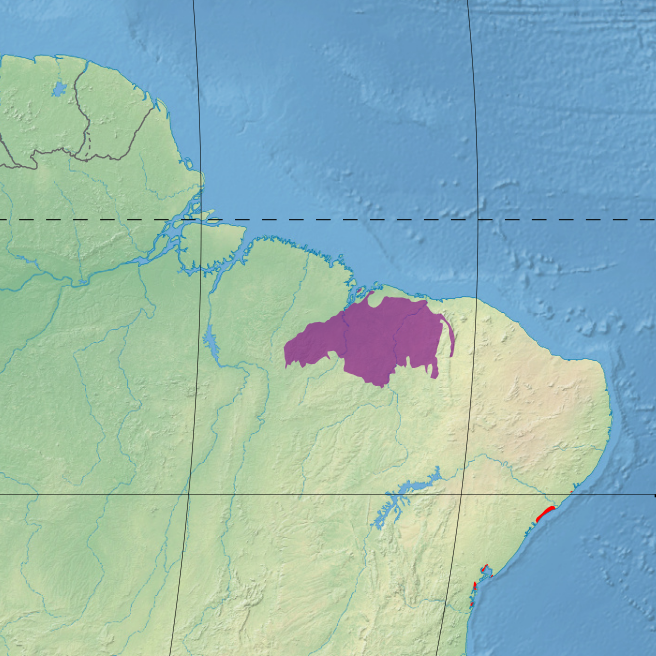
- Ecoregion territory (in purple)

Ecology
- Realm: Neotropical
- Biome: tropical and subtropical moist broadleaf forests
- Borders: List: Amazon–Orinoco–Southern Caribbean mangroves; Caatinga; Caatinga moist-forest enclaves; Cerrado, Tocantins–Araguaia–Maranhão moist forests

Geography
- Area: 141,591 km^{2} (54,669 sq mi)
- Countries: Brazil
- States: Maranhão; Piauí, Ceara

Conservation
- Conservation status: Critical/endangered
- Protected: 27,925 km^{2} (20%)

The Maranhão Babaçu forests is a tropical moist broadleaf forest ecoregion of north-central Brazil. The forests form a transition between the equatorial forests of the Amazon biome to the west, the drier Cerrado savannas to the south and Caatinga shrublands to the east.

== Setting ==
The Maranhão Babaçu forests cover an area of 141,591 square kilometers (54,669 sq mi), extending across northeastern and central Maranhão state and northern Piauí state. The ecoregion is bounded by the Maranhão mangroves and the Northeastern Brazil restingas along the coast to the north, the Tocantins–Araguaia–Maranhão moist forests of Amazonia across the Pindaré River to the northwest and west, the Cerrado tropical savanna to the south, and the Caatingas xeric shrublands to the east.

== Flora ==
The Flora of the ecoregion is varied, with the western portion of the region hosting tall and diverse moist evergreen and semi-deciduous forests, while the eastern portion is a mosaic of open woodlands and shrublands, with patches of dry savanna. Seasonally wet savannas are found on the lower reaches of the major rivers.

The dominant tree in the region is the Babaçu palm (Attalea speciosa), an oil palm that occurs naturally along the southern edge of the Amazonian forests, but whose predominance has been extended by its tolerance to human-caused fires and forest clearing.

Another common species is the Carnauba palm (Copernicia prunifera). It is the source of carnauba wax, which is harvested from the coating on the leaves of the tree. The fruit and pith are eaten, the leaves are variously employed and the wood is used in building. In some places like Ceará State, it is known as the "Tree of Life".

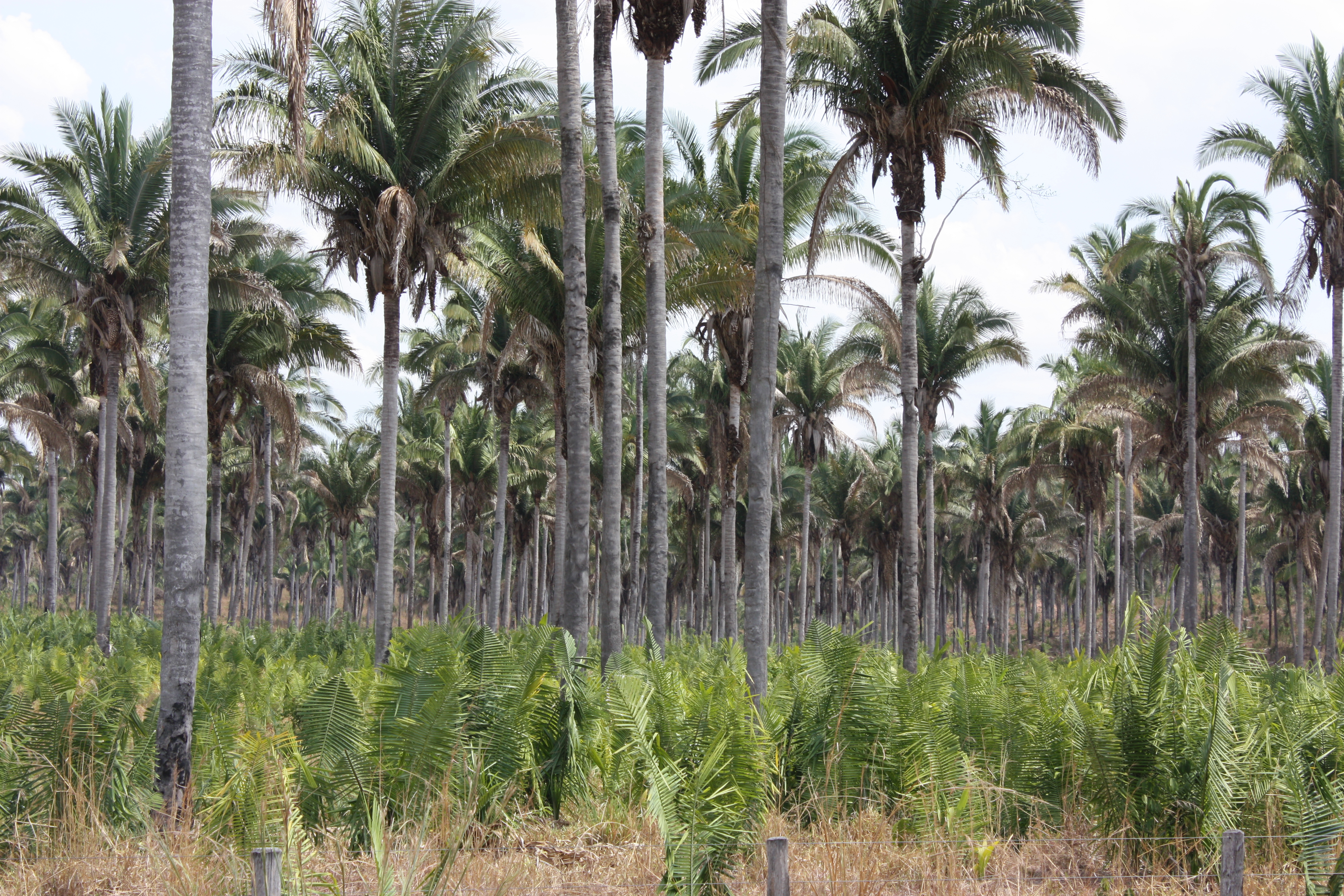
A. speciosa forest in Maranhão state, Brazil

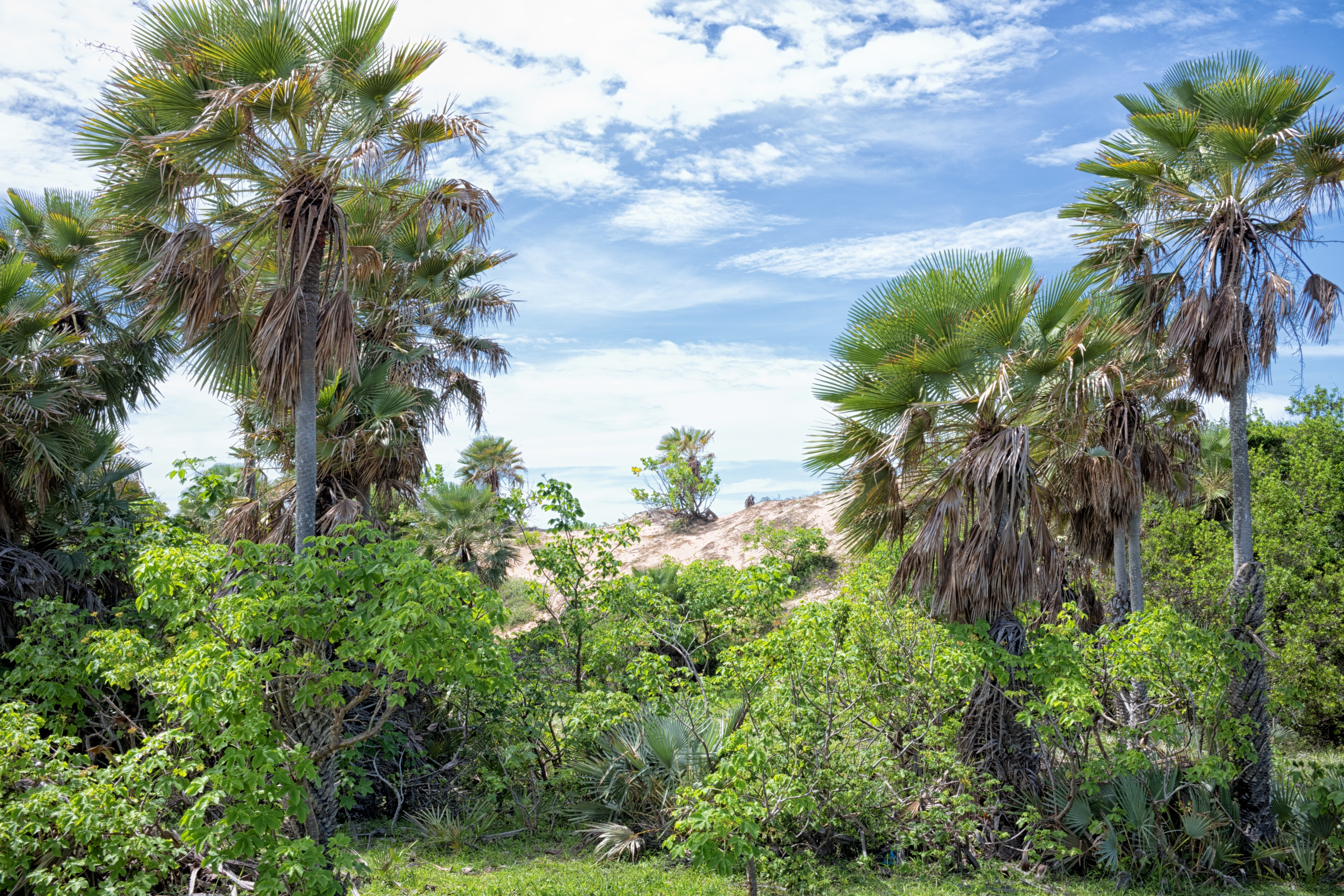
Copernicia prunifera in Brazil

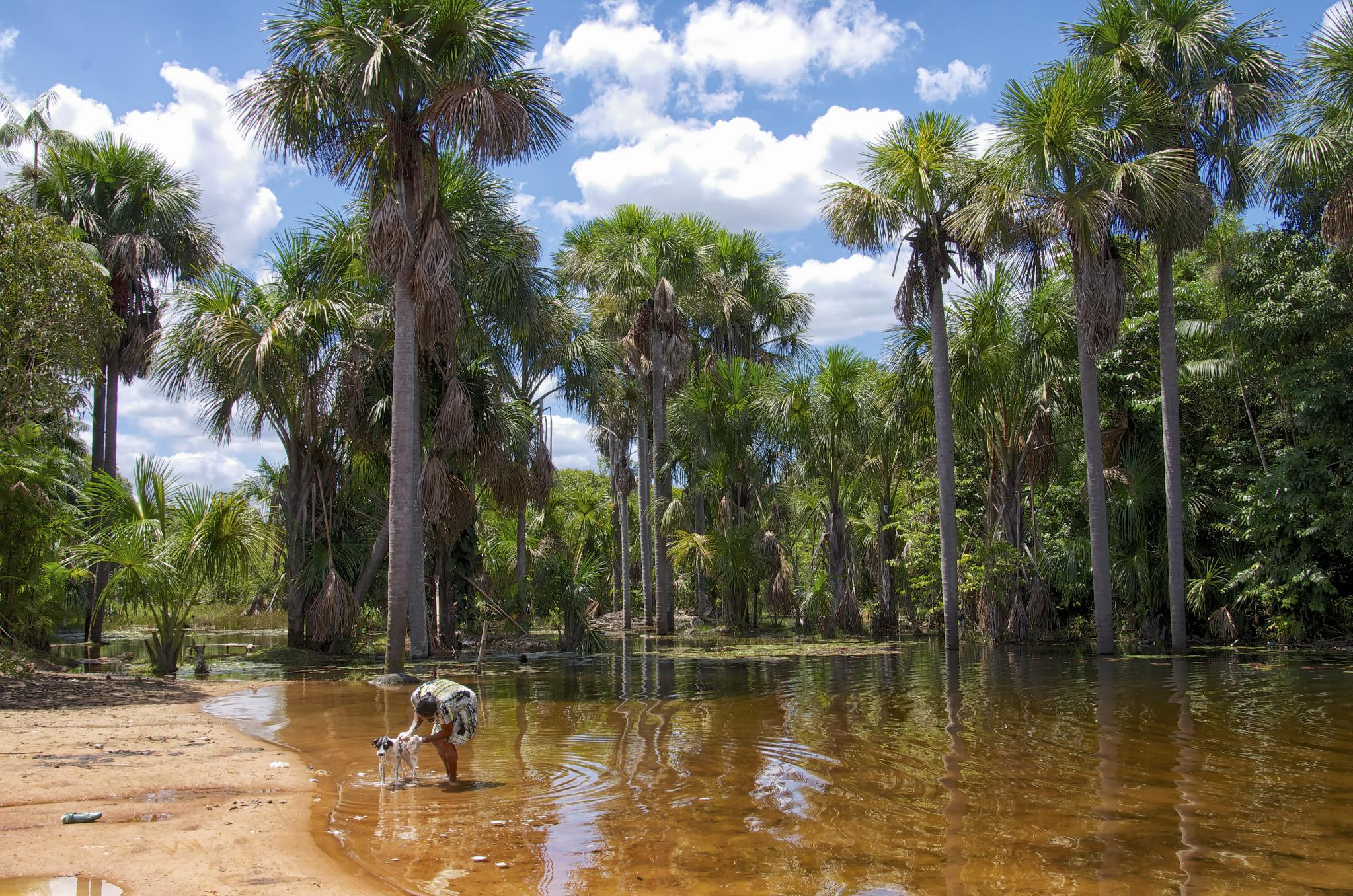
Mauritia flexuosa trees in Maranhão

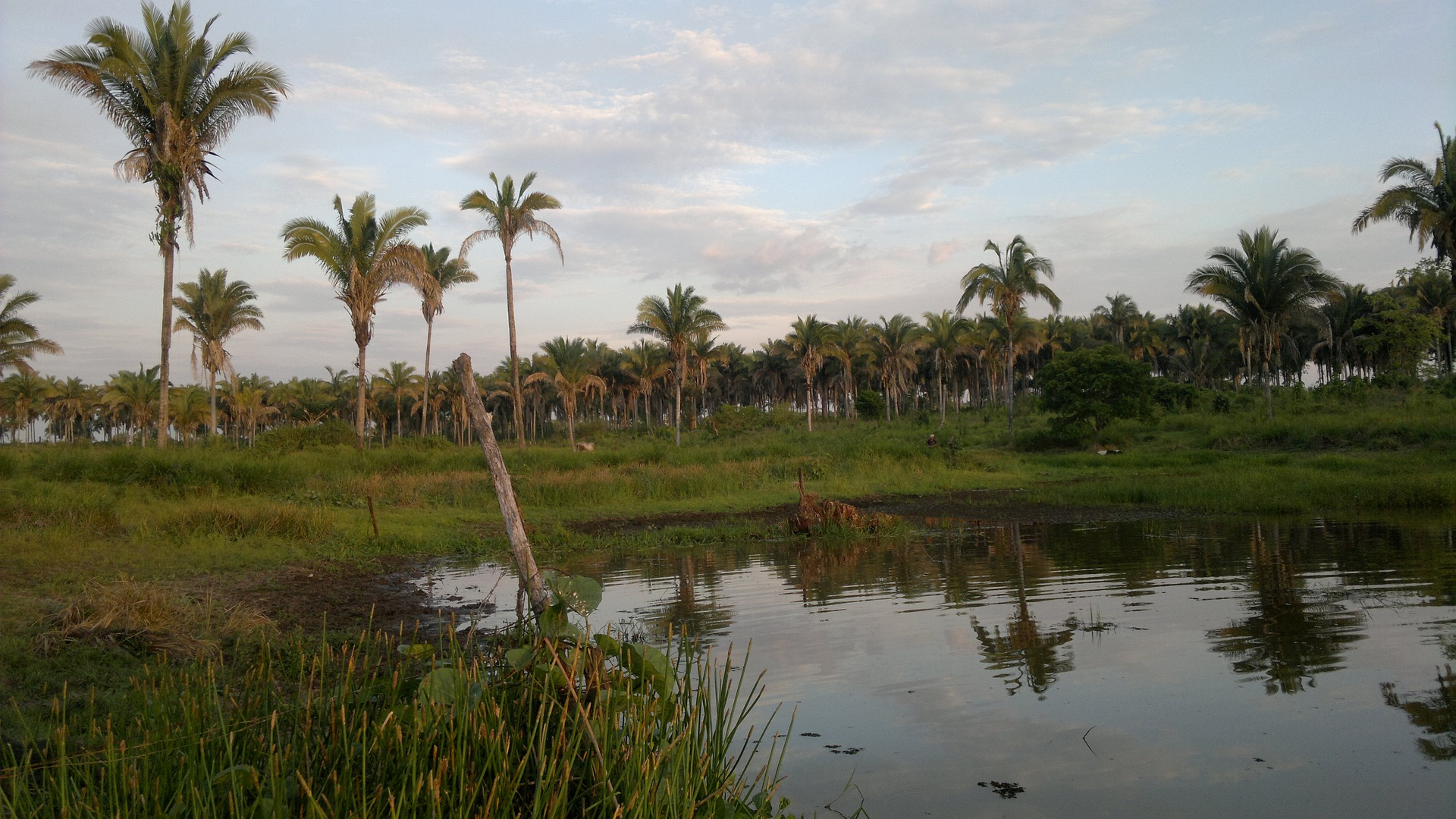
Babassu palm trees in Bom Lugar, Maranhão.

== Fauna ==
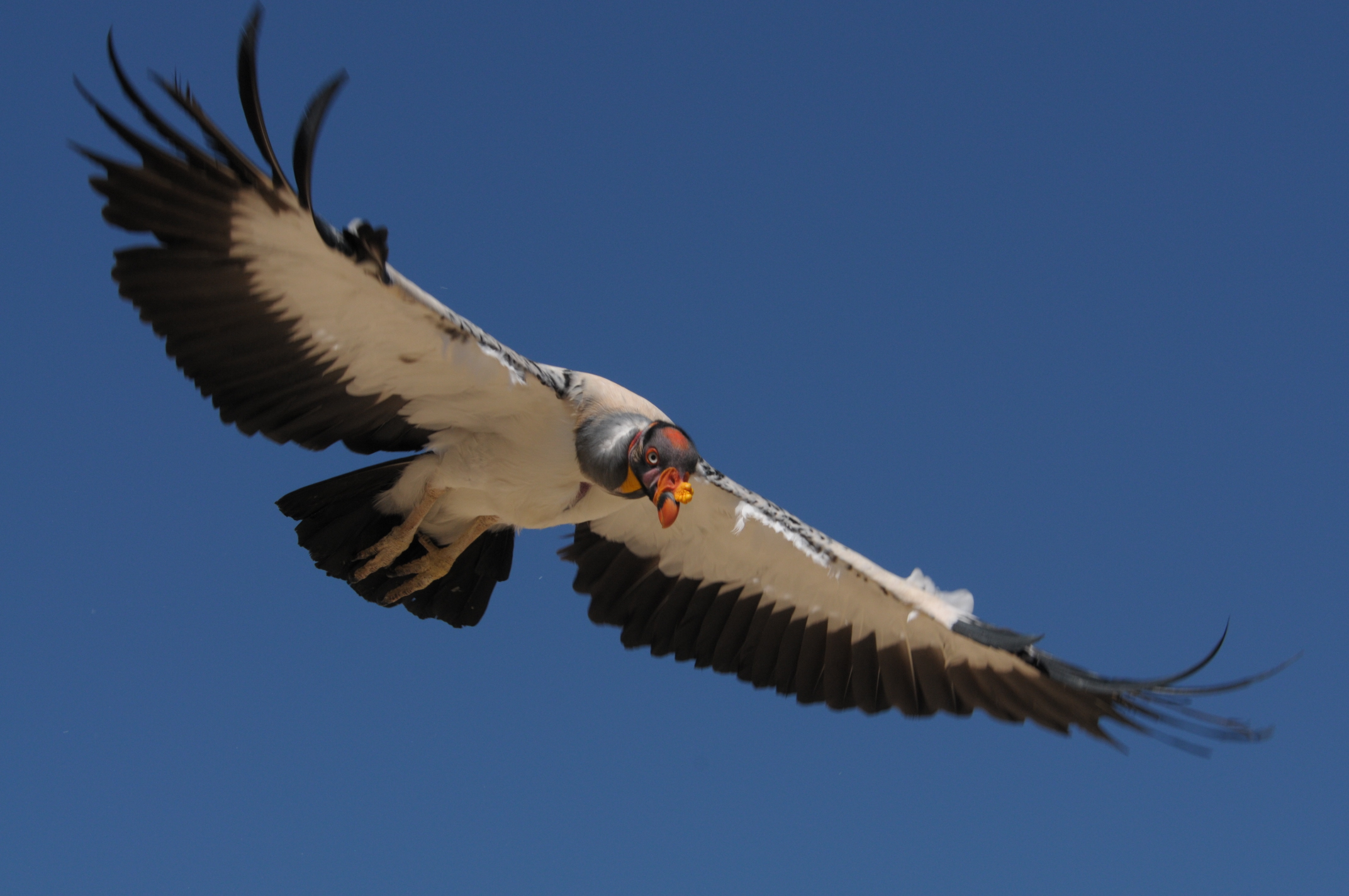
King vulture

Babaçu forests are inhabited by many animal species, some of these are found in the rivers that cut the forest extension, others live in the forest itself. Birds like macaws, parrots are common. Herons and other aquatic birds are usually seen along the rivers banks and lake margins while hunting for crustaceans and fish.

There are also many species of mammals such as monkeys, wild dogs, felines, possums, armadillos, anteaters, wild pigs and the wild deer. Some species of aquatic mammals such as giant otters and river dolphins are also found there. Reptiles are also found in abundance, with many snakes and lizard species such as the green iguana and also some species of geckos. The amphibians are also abundant, being more common during the raining season, when it is possible to see a great number of toad and frog species.

In the water there are many species of animals such as fishes that belong to the Cichlidae and Characidae families and many crustaceans as well, some of these are freshwater shrimps and crabs.

Insects, spiders, centipedes and many other invertebrate species are very common and most of them are found during the night. Huge beetles are found in the region and their larvae, locally called "gongo" are an important nutritional source for many of the animals that live there and also for human beings that forage for nuts and occasionally are able to find some of these huge larvae.

== Conservation and threats ==
A 2017 assessment found that 27,925 km^{2}, or 20%, of the ecoregion is in protected areas. Protected areas include Sete Cidades National Park and Serra da Ibiapaba Environmental Protection Area.
