= Guamá River =

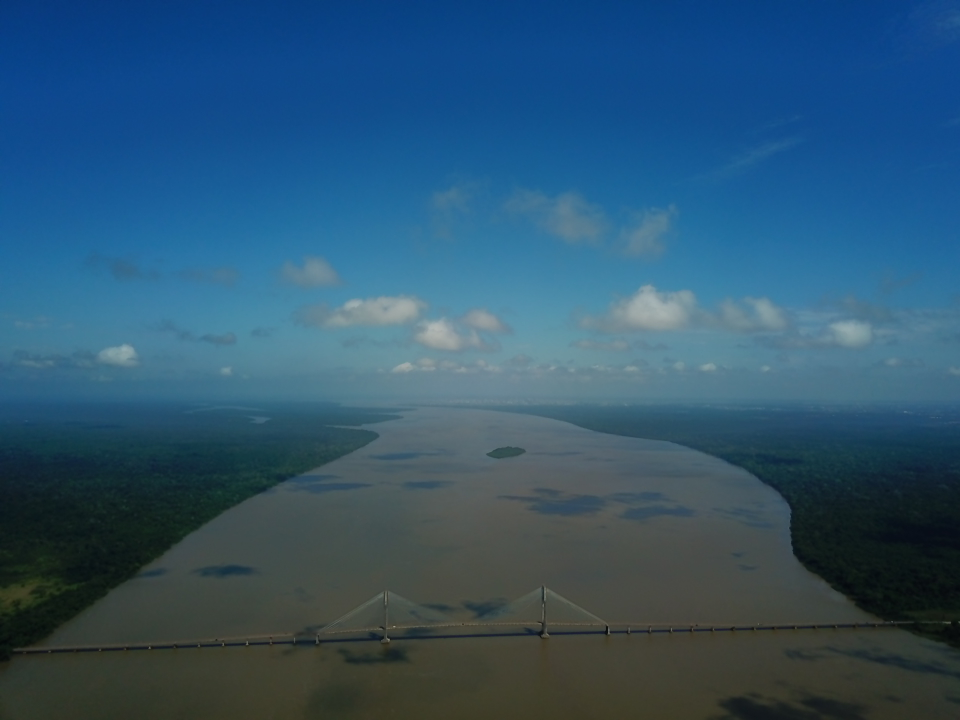
- Guamá River and Almir Gabriel Bridge

- Mouth location in Brazil

Location
- Country: Brazil

Physical characteristics
- Source
  - location: Pará
- Mouth
  - coordinates: 1°29′01″S 48°29′01″W
- Length: 82 km (51 mi)
- Basin size: 87,390 km^{2} (33,740 mi^{2})
- Discharge
  - location: mouth
  - average: 2,192 m^{3}/s (77,400 cu ft/s)

Basin features
- River system: Pará
- Tributaries
  - left: Capim, Acará

The Guamá River is located in northeast Pará state in north-central Brazil. Its mouth forms the southern border of the state capital, Belém. Its watershed drains an area of 87,389.54 km^{2} (33,741.29 mi^{2}). The navigability is feasible in the last 160 km (100 mi) of the river, from the municipality of São Miguel do Guamá to Guajará Bay. Among its tributaries, the Acará, Capim and Moju rivers stand out. In the Guamá River, the pororoca phenomenon usually occurs. The main campus of the Federal University of Pará, near Belém, is located on its right bank. About 75% of the water consumed in Belém comes from this river, which receives 11 streams contaminated by the irregular disposal of urban waste, since only 4, 5% of the home network of the Pará capital is connected to the collecting network.

The Gurupí, Capim and Guamá rivers flow into the mouth of the Amazon and are affected by the daily tides, which force water from the Amazon upstream. They are in the Tocantins–Araguaia–Maranhão moist forests ecoregion.

== See also ==
- List of rivers of Pará

== Sources ==
- Sears, Robin, South America: Eastern extreme of the Amazon basin in Brazil (NT0170), WWF: World Wildlife Fund
