= Pseudolithoxus tigris =

Conservation status
- Least Concern (IUCN 3.1)

Scientific classification
- Kingdom: Animalia
- Phylum: Chordata
- Class: Actinopterygii
- Division: Teleostei
- Order: Siluriformes
- Family: Loricariidae
- Genus: Pseudolithoxus
- Species: P. tigris

Binomial name
- Pseudolithoxus tigris (Armbruster & Provenzano, 2000)

Synonyms
- Lasiancistrus tigris Armbruster & Provenzano, 2000

Species of fish

Pseudolithoxus tigris is a species of freshwater ray-finned fish belonging to the family Loricariidae, the suckermouth armoured catfishes, and the subfamily Hypostominae, the suckermouth catfishes. This catfish is found in Colombia and Venezuela where it is found in the upper Orinoco and Ventuari River basins. from San Fernando de Atabapo almost to the Casiquiare canal. This species grows to a standard length of 9.4 cm (3.7 in).

P. tigris probably matures at a relatively small size; in a specimen about 5 cm (2 in) SL, the snout and pectoral-fin spine odontodes are already greatly elongated, while the odontodes are only beginning to develop in similarly sized specimens of other species.

P. tigris sometimes appears in the aquarium trade, where it is typically referred to either as the tigerstriped plane pleco or by its associated L-number, which is L-257.
