= Tocantins–Araguaia–Maranhão moist forests =

Ecoregion in Brazil

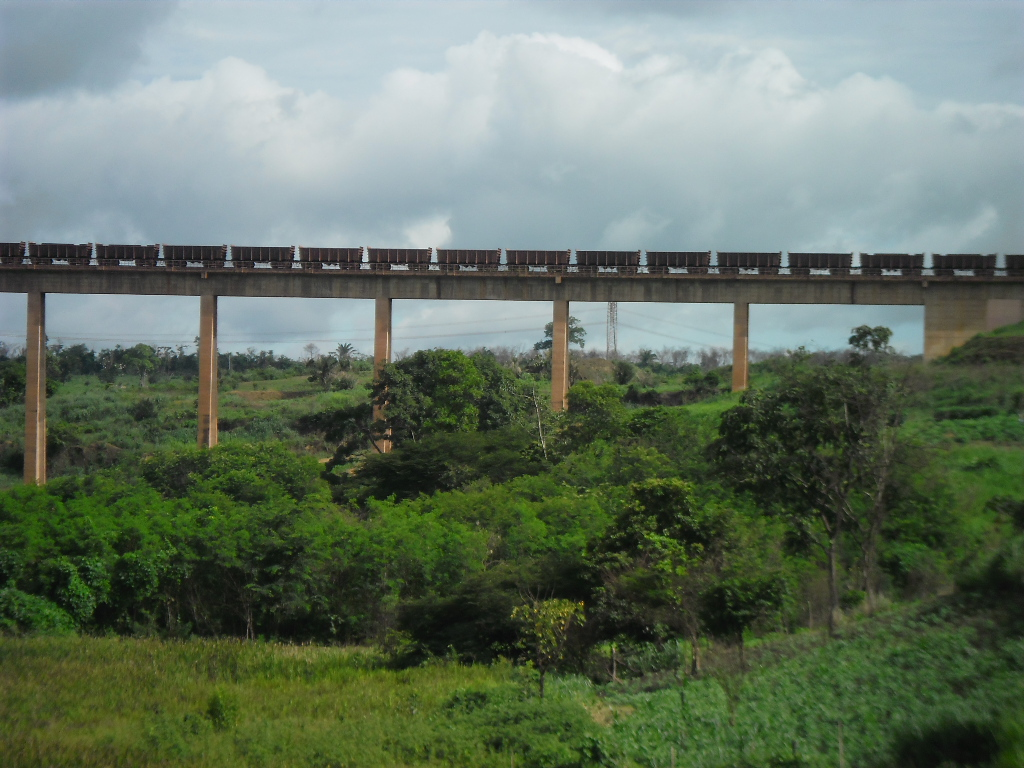
- Açailândia in the south of the ecoregion

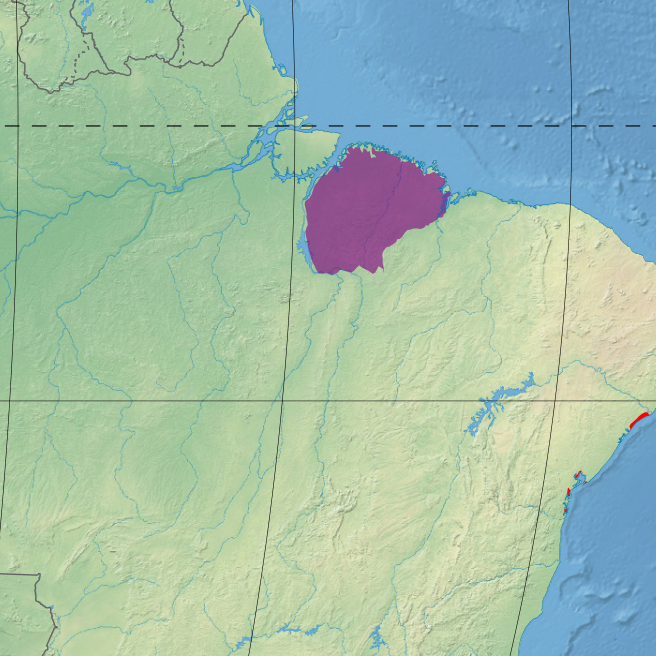
- Ecoregion territory (in purple)

Ecology
- Realm: Neotropical
- Biome: Tropical and subtropical moist broadleaf forests – Amazon

Geography
- Country: Brazil
- Coordinates: 2.974°S 47.315°W

The Tocantins–Araguaia–Maranhão moist forests (NT0170), also called the Tocantins/Pindaré moist forests, is an ecoregion in the north of Brazil to the south of the mouth of the Amazon River. It is part of the Amazon biome. The ecoregion contains the city of Belém, capital of the state of Pará. It is the most developed part of the Amazon region, and is one of the most severely degraded natural habitats of the region.

== Location ==
The Tocantins–Araguaia–Maranhão moist forests ecoregion is the most eastern of the Amazon region. It covers the east of the state of Pará and the north of Maranhão. The main cities are Belém, Paragominas and Bragança. Its western border is the Tocantins River, a tributary of the Amazon River. It is bordered by the mouth of the Amazon to the northwest and the Atlantic Ocean to the northeast. The southern border is defined by the Mearim River. To the east it is bounded by the Pindaré River and the Baía de São Marcos.

The Marajó várzea at the mouth of the Amazon lies to the north. There is a belt of Amazon–Orinoco–Southern Caribbean mangroves along the Atlantic coast to the northeast. To the southeast the ecoregion adjoins the Maranhão Babaçu forests. In the south it meets the Cerrado ecoregion and elements of the Mato Grosso seasonal forests. To the west it adjoins the Xingu–Tocantins–Araguaia moist forests on the other side of the Tocantins River.

== Physical ==
Most of the region is an alluvial plain formed by the Amazon river. The Serra do Tiracambu and Serra do Gurupi in the southwest are low hills less than 200 metres (660 ft) high. The Gurupí, Capim, and the whitewater Guamá rivers flow into the mouth of the Amazon and are affected by the daily tides, which force water from the Amazon upstream. The Mearim and Pindaré empty into the Atlantic Ocean. Soils are mainly low in nutrients and consist of deeply weathered clay.

== Ecology ==
The ecoregion is in the Neotropical realm and the tropical and subtropical moist broadleaf forests biome.

=== Climate ===
The Köppen climate classification is "Am": equatorial, monsoonal. Temperatures are fairly steady throughout the year, slightly cooler in August and slightly warmer in April. Average temperatures range from 22 °C (72 °F) to 32 °C (90 °F) with a mean temperature of 27.5 °C (81.5 °F). The ecoregion experiences a dry season for five months of each year, with monthly rainfall of less than 100 millimetres (3.9 in). This is most marked in the northwest of Maranhão. Rainfall is lowest in September, with less than 50 millimetres (2.0 in), and greatest in March, with over 375 millimetres (14.8 in). During the wet season the streams and rivers expand and flood the low lying regions. Annual rainfall is about 2,500 millimetres (98 in) in the north, and 1,500 millimetres (59 in) in the drier south where the moist forest merges into cerrado shrubland.

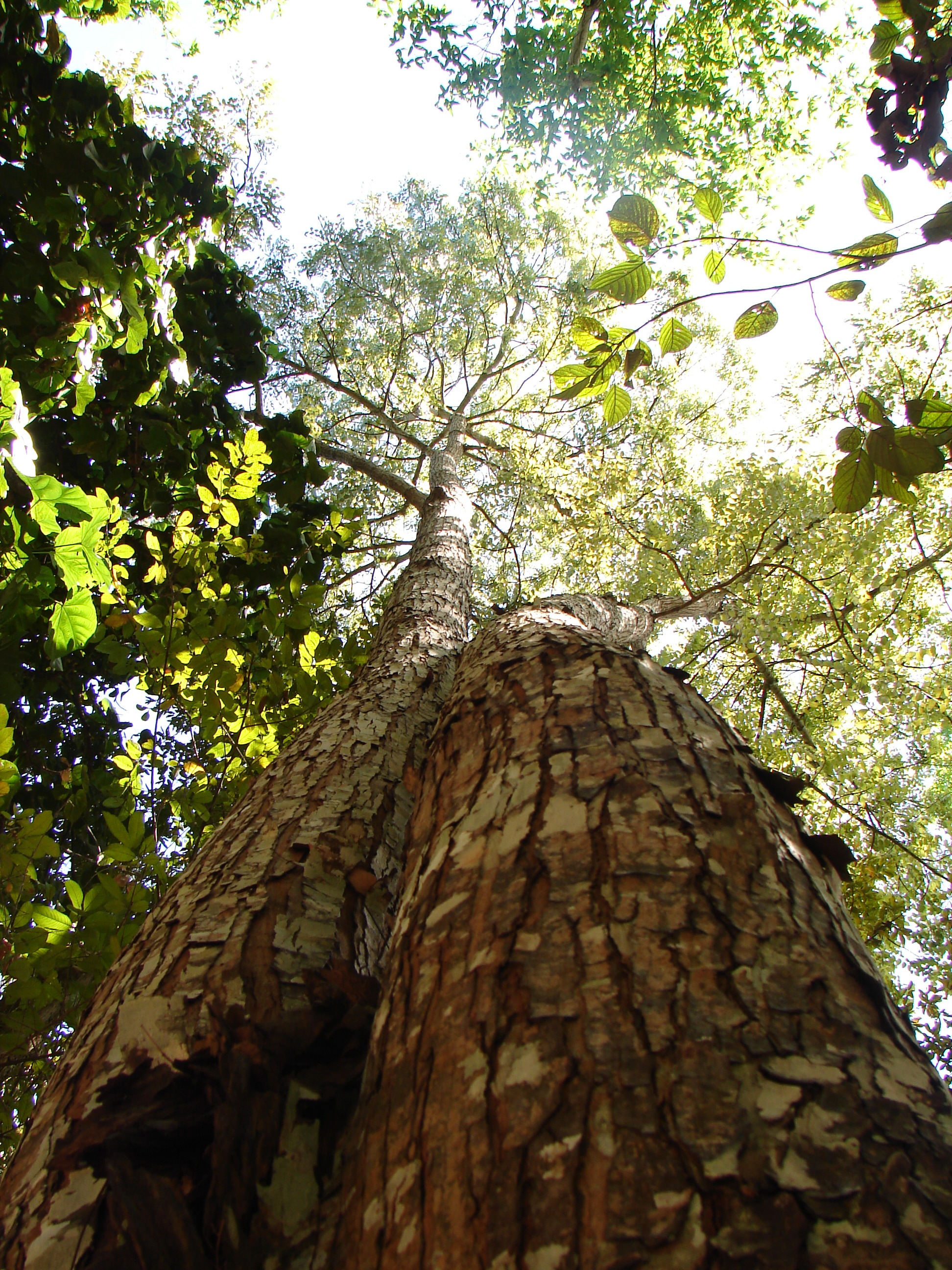
Mahogany Swietenia macrophylla

=== Flora ===
The ecoregion may be a diversification center for many taxa of trees, and in the past the west of the region may have been a refugium. There is a wide variety of species in the dense evergreen rainforest due to the many rivers and to the transitional nature of the flora between the Amazon basin and the drier southern vegetation. The ecoregion contains flooded forests and terra firme forests.

The flooded forests are either igapó, flooded daily by clear blackwater rivers, or várzea, flooded daily by whitewater rivers that take their color from suspended soil and organic matter. The igapó forests are adapted to acidic white sand soils that are poor in nutrients. The trees are lower and less diverse than in the terra firme forests. Common species in the igapó and várzea include Caraipa grandiflora, Virola surinamensis, Euterpe oleraceae, Ficus pulchella, Mauritia martiana, Symphonia globulifera, and members of the Tovomita and Clusia genera.

The most common families in the terra firme forests are Lecythidaceae, Chrysobalanaceae, Burseraceae, Fabaceae, Lauraceae and Sapotaceae. Tree species include Lecythis odora, Lecythis turbinata, Cenostigma tocantina, Bombax tocantinum, and Bauhinia bombaciflora, a large liana. The legume Vouacapoua americana is the most important timber tree, growing only in the east of the Amazon region. Brazil nut (Bertholletia excelsa) is uncommon in the region and there are few orchids. The threatened mahogany (Swietenia macrophylla) may be found along the upper Capim and Guamá rivers. Other rare or threatened trees include Pilocarpus microphyllus and Dicypellium caryophyllatum.

=== Fauna ===
149 species of mammals have been recorded, of which over 80 are bats. Mammals include red-handed howler (Alouatta belzebul), red-handed tamarin (Saguinus midas), brown-throated sloth (Bradypus variegatus), Linnaeus's two-toed sloth (Choloepus didactylus) and nine-banded armadillo (Dasypus novemcinctus). Endangered mammals include white-cheeked spider monkey (Ateles marginatus), black bearded saki (Chiropotes satanas) and giant otter (Pteronura brasiliensis).

There are more than 76 species of snakes. The rivers have many fish and aquatic reptiles. Endangered reptiles include green sea turtle (Chelonia mydas), hawksbill sea turtle (Eretmochelys imbricata) and Maranhão slider (Trachemys adiutrix).

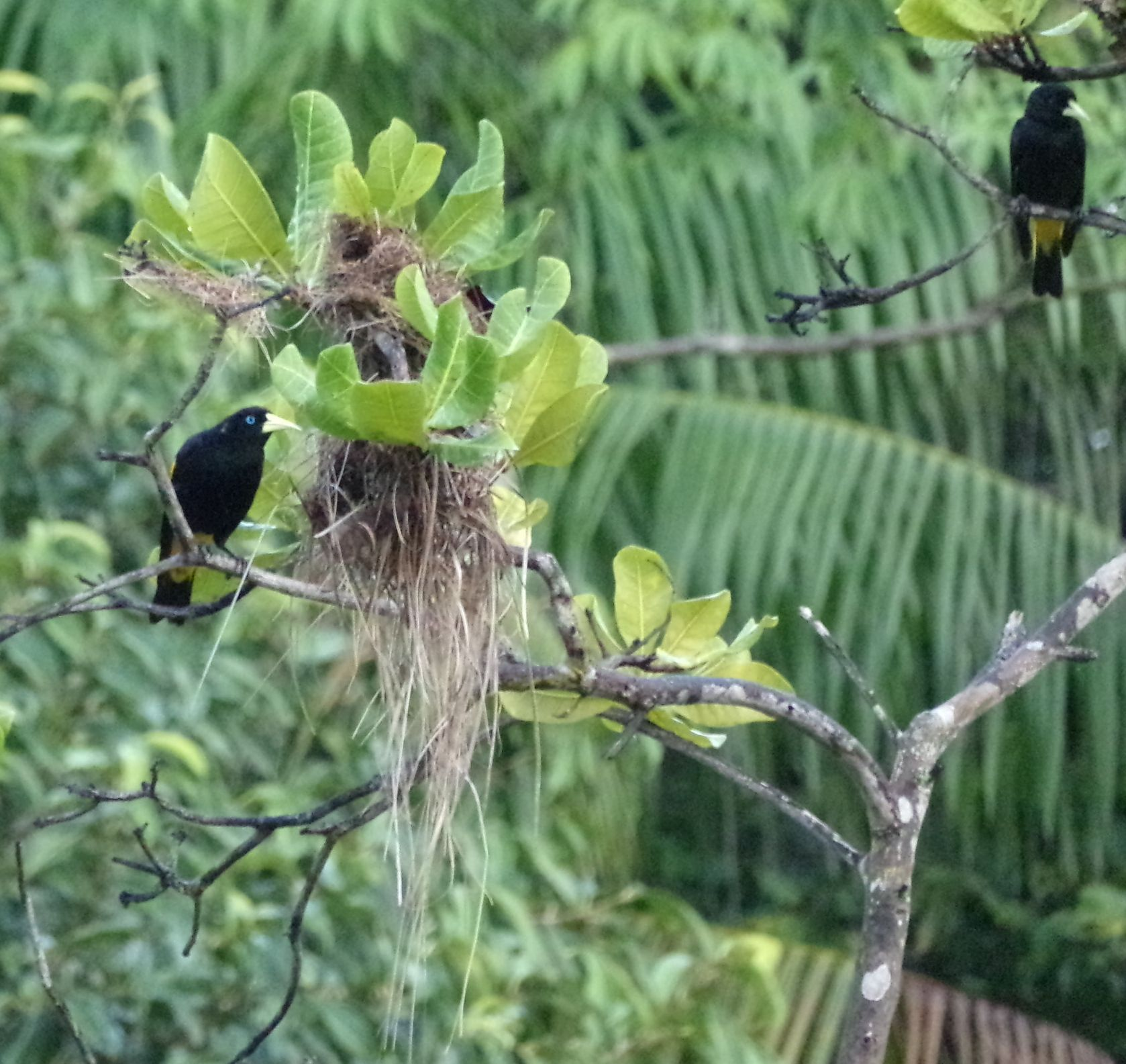
Yellow-rumped cacique (Cacicus cela) in the Parque Ambiental Adhemar Monteiro in Paragominas

517 species of birds have been recorded, including two species of heron that are uncommon in other parts of the Amazon region, tricolored heron (Egretta tricolor) and yellow-crowned night heron (Nyctanassa violacea). Other birds include toucans (genus Ramphastos), red-throated piping guan (Pipile cujubi), white-crested guan (Penelope pileata), parrots, parakeets and many migrant birds from the Nearctic realm. Endangered birds include red-necked aracari (Pteroglossus bitorquatus) and yellow-bellied seedeater (Sporophila nigricollis).

== Status ==
The Tapajós–Xingu, Xingu–Tocantins–Araguaia, and Tocantins–Araguaia–Maranhão moist forests ecoregions on the eastern edge of the Amazon basin have all been badly affected by human settlement and deforestation. The Xingu-Tocantins-Araguaia ecoregion is one of the most developed in the Amazon region, with most of the habitat threatened by cities and highways. There are large industrial and agricultural developments along the roads and colonization along the rivers. The Tucuruí Dam on the Tocantins below Marabá flooded 2,430 square kilometres (940 sq mi) of low-lying forest. Over a third of the forests have been cleared, often leaving degraded land.

The result is a patchwork of forest remnants, secondary forests, fields, pastures and urban sprawl. Fires are often used to clear land, threatening the remaining forest ecosystems with their many rare species. Seedlings of rainforest trees cannot grow in the dry and eroded pastures, so forest regeneration is difficult. During the period from 2004 to 2011 the ecoregion experienced an annual rate of habitat loss of 0.51%. Global warming will force tropical species to migrate uphill to find areas with suitable temperature and rainfall. Low, flat and deforested ecoregions such as the Tocantins/Pindare moist forests are extremely vulnerable.

There are a number of small protected areas. The Caxiuanã National Forest covers 2,000 square kilometres (770 sq mi) and offers a degree of protection.

== Sources ==
- "Amazon Basin Ecoregions", Global Forest Atlas, Yale
- Coca-Castro, Alejandro; Reymondin, Louis; Bellfield, Helen; Hyman, Glenn (January 2013), Land use Status and Trends in Amazonia (PDF), Amazonia Security Agenda Project, archived from the original (PDF) on 2016-03-19
- Feeley, Kenneth J.; Rehm, Evan (2013), Amazon’s vulnerability to climate change heightened by deforestation and man-made dispersal barriers (PDF), Miami, FL: Florida International University
- Sears, Robin, South America: Eastern extreme of the Amazon basin in Brazil (NT0170), WWF: World Wildlife Fund
- "Tocantins/Pindare moist forests", Global Species, Myers Enterprises II
- WildFinder, WWF: World Wildlife Fund
