= Gurupí River =

Gurupi River
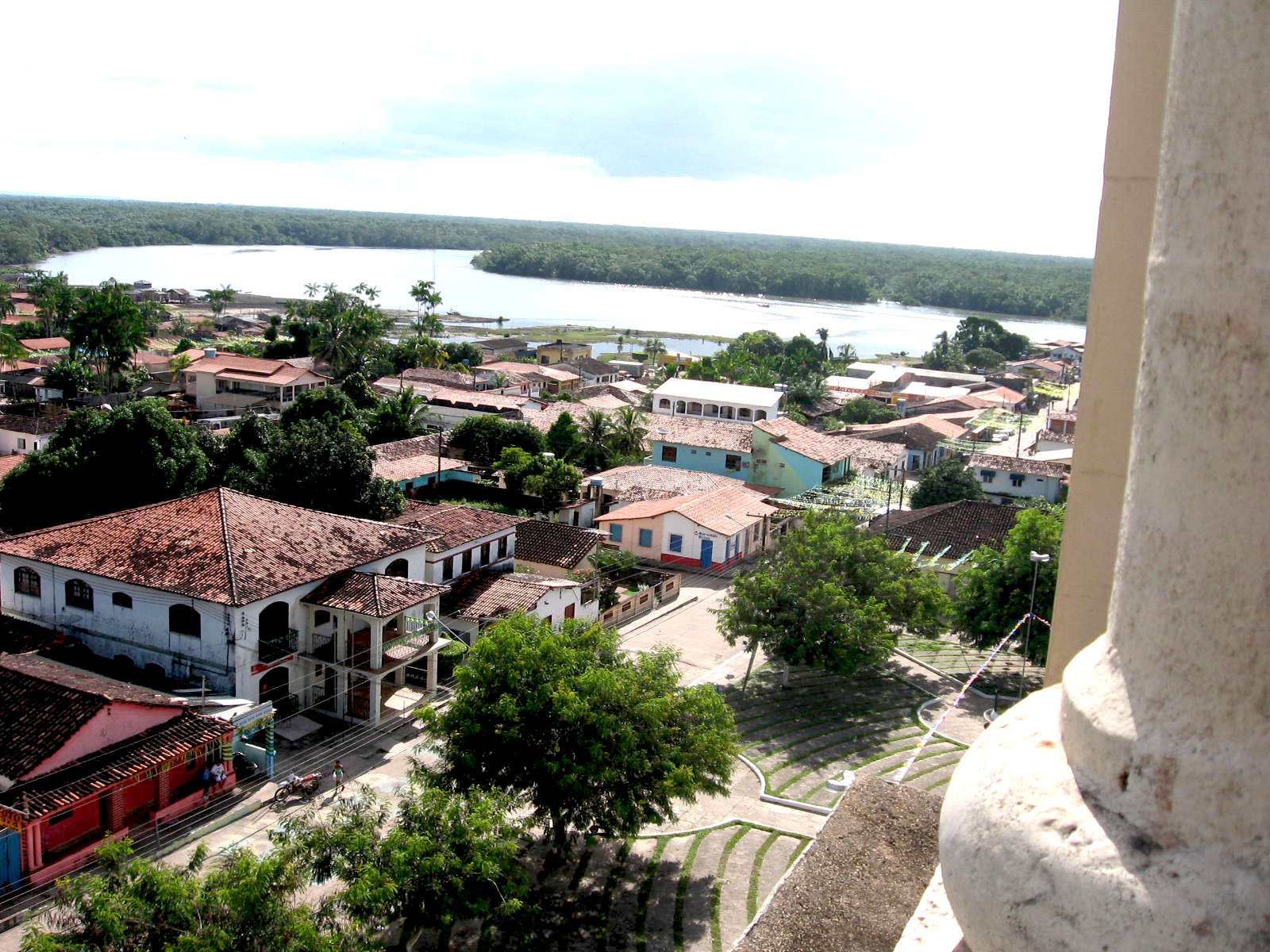

- Location within Brazil
- Native name: Rio Gurupi (Portuguese)

Location
- Country: Brazil

Physical characteristics
- Source
  - location: Maranhão state
- 2nd source
  - location: Pará state
- Mouth
  - location: Atlantic ocean, near Carutapera
  - coordinates: 1.116806°S 46.055048°W

The Gurupi River is a river in north-central Brazil that forms the boundary between Maranhão and Pará states. The Gurupi rises in the low hills that separate its basin from that of the Tocantins River to the south, and flows north into the Atlantic Ocean. The Serra do Tiracambu lies to the east, and separates the basin of the Gurupi from that of the Pindaré River.

Part of the basin lies in the 271,197 hectares (670,140 acres) Gurupi Biological Reserve, a fully protected conservation unit created in 1988. The average annual rainfall is 2,169 millimetres (85.4 in). Temperatures range from 22 to 32 °C (72 to 90 °F) with an average of 27 °C (81 °F). The Gurupi basin is home to tropical moist broadleaf forest, and lies within the Tocantins–Araguaia–Maranhão moist forest ecoregion.

== See also ==
- List of rivers of Maranhão
- List of rivers of Pará
