= 2024 in Brazil =

Events in the year 2024 in Brazil.

== Incumbents ==
=== Federal government ===
- President
  - Luiz Inácio Lula da Silva
- Vice President
  - Geraldo Alckmin
- President of the Chamber of Deputies
  - Arthur Lira
- President of the Federal Senate
  - Rodrigo Pacheco
- President of the Supreme Federal Court
  - Luís Roberto Barroso

== Events ==
=== January ===
- 8 January – Twenty-five people die and six others are injured in a crash involving a truck and a tourist minibus on a highway near São José do Jacuípe, Bahia.
- 15 January – Heavy rains cause the deaths of 11 people in Rio de Janeiro.
- 20 January – A magnitude 6.6 earthquake strikes Acre and Amazonas states, making it the strongest recorded earthquake to hit Brazil. No casualties or damage are reported.
- 29 January – A Piper PA-46 crashes in a rural area of Itapeva, Minas Gerais; seven people on board die.

=== February ===
- 22 February – At least eight people die during floods and landslides in Rio de Janeiro State.
- 21 February – 8 May – 2024 Copa Verde football competition is held.

=== March ===
- 24 March – Twenty-three people die in a rainstorm in Espírito Santo and Rio de Janeiro states.

=== April ===
- 26 April – 2024 Porto Alegre fire: A fire at a guesthouse in Porto Alegre results in the deaths of at least ten people.

=== May ===
- 2-13 May – 2024 Rio Grande do Sul floods: At least 147 people die from flooding caused by heavy rains in Rio Grande do Sul. At least 127 others are listed as missing and 372 injured, while more than two million people in the state are affected and 600,000 others displaced.
- 3 May – The 14 de Julho Dam fails after heavy rainfall in Rio Grande do Sul.
- 17 May – Brazil is awarded the hosting rights for the 2027 FIFA Women's World Cup.
- 29 May – Brazil withdraws its ambassador to Israel amid criticism over the latter's war in Gaza.

=== June ===
- 10 June – 2024 Brazil wildfires: 32,000 hectares (79,000 acres) of tropical wetland in the Pantanal are affected, a 935% increase in the number of fires over the same period last year. A state of emergency is subsequently declared in the region on 25 June.
- 25 June – The Supreme Federal Court rules in favor of decriminalising possession of marijuana for personal use.

=== July ===
- 1 July – Air Europa Flight UX045 makes an emergency landing at Natal Airport after encountering severe turbulence near the Brazilian coast on its way from Madrid to Montevideo. Thirty of the aircraft's 325 passengers and crew are injured.
- 5 July – Ten people die and 42 others are injured after a bus crashes into a bridge near Itapetininga, São Paulo state.
- 9 July – 2024 Brazil wildfires: Wildfires burn 760,000 hectares (1.8 million acres) of the Pantanal, destroying over 4% of Brazil's largest wetland.
- 17 July – A massive fishkill suspected to have been caused by the dumping of industrial waste from a sugar and ethanol plant results in the deaths of between 10 and 20 tons of fish in the Piracicaba River in São Paulo state.
- 23 July – A study by the Oswaldo Cruz Foundation finds the first incidence of cocaine discovered in sharks following tests on 13 Brazilian sharpnose sharks off the coast of Rio de Janeiro, in what is believed to be caused by waste from illegal laboratories and users.
- 25 July –
  - The Brazilian government formally issues an apology for the persecution and detention of Japanese immigrants from 1946 to 1948.
  - The Ministry of Health reports the world's first Oropouche fever deaths from two women in Bahia, escalating the ongoing 2023–2024 Oropouche virus disease outbreak.

=== August ===
- 2 August –
  - Leticia Carvalho of Brazil is elected as secretary-general of the International Seabed Authority.
  - Judoka Beatriz Souza wins gold in the over 78 kg category at the Paris Summer Olympics.
- 3 August – Eight people die in an attack by farmers on members of the indigenous Guarani-Kaiowa community in Douradina, Mato Grosso do Sul.
- 5 August – Gymnast Rebeca Andrade wins gold on floor exercise at the Paris Summer Olympics.
- 7 August – The Government reports that deforestation in the Amazon rainforest is at its lowest level since 2016.
- 8 August – Brazil orders the expulsion of the Nicaraguan ambassador in retaliation for the expulsion of its ambassador in Managua amid a diplomatic row over criticism by President Lula da Silva of the authoritarian regime of President Daniel Ortega.
- 9 August –
  - Voepass Linhas Aéreas Flight 2283 crashes in Vinhedo, São Paulo State; all 62 people on board die.
  - Duda Lisboa and Ana Patrícia win gold for Brazil in women's beach volleyball at the Paris Summer Olympics
- 17 August – Brazilian investigation into Elon Musk: X shuts down its operations with the exception of service accessibility in Brazil following a dispute between the former's owner, Elon Musk and Supreme Federal Court justice Alexandre de Moraes over the blocking of accounts accused of spreading misinformation.
- 22 August – 2024 Brazil wildfires: Nearly 1,500 firefighters are dispatched to contain intense wildfires that are causing dense hazardous smoke to fully "engulf" Porto Velho, with the total number of wildfires in Brazil reaching 59,000 since the start of the year.
- 23 August – Two people die in a wildfire that his an industrial plant in Urupes, São Paulo State.
- 27 August – Forty-eight cities issue red alerts for prolonged heavy, hazardous smog coming from extensive wildfires, with Brasília being covered in toxic hazardous smog for two days.
- 31 August – Brazilian investigation into Elon Musk: X is blocked in Brazil after the firm fails to comply with a deadline from Supreme Federal Court justice Alexandre de Moraes to name a legal representative in the country and pay fines.

=== September ===
- 1 September – The number of wildfires in the Amazon rainforest reaches its highest number in fourteen years at 38,266 fire hotspots as a result of an ongoing drought in South America.
- 2 September – The Supreme Federal Court unanimously upholds justice Alexandre de Moraes' decision to block X in Brazil. De Moraes also sets a daily fine of R$50,000 (US$8,900) for people or companies using VPNs to access the site.
- 4 September –
  - Twenty percent of the Brasília National Forest is destroyed by a wildfire that investigators suspect was started deliberately.
  - SpaceX removes its employees from Brazil amid ongoing legal issues between CEO Elon Musk and the Supreme Federal Court over Musk's social media company X.
- 6 September – President Lula dismisses human rights minister Silvio Almeida following complaints of sexual misconduct against the latter.
- 9 September – Fifty-nine percent of Brazil's landmass is reported to be suffering from its worst recorded drought, which also cause historically low water levels in the Amazon basin levels and contribute to at least 160,000 wildfires causing widespread air pollution.
- 21 September – Three players of the Coritiba Crocodiles American football team die after their bus overturns on their way to a match in Rio de Janeiro.
- 23 September – A judge in Pernambuco orders the arrest of singer Gusttavo Lima on charges of money laundering and illegal gambling. The order is suspended the following day by another judge.
- 25 September – Ukrainian President Volodymyr Zelenskyy accuses Brazil and China of using their proposed peace plan for ending the Russo–Ukrainian War to boost their geopolitical power "at Ukraine's expense" by urging developing nations to agree to it.
- 30 September – A suspect is convicted of obstructing the investigation into the assassination of Marielle Franco and is sentenced to five years' imprisonment.

=== October ===
- 6 October:
  - 2024 Brazilian municipal elections (first round)
    - 2024 São Paulo mayoral election: Reelectionist Ricardo Nunes and federal deputy Guilherme Boulos advance to the second round.
    - 2024 Rio de Janeiro mayoral election: Reelectionist Eduardo Paes wins a fourth non-consecutive term and an absolute majority in the first round.
    - 2024 Salvador mayoral election
- 8 October – The Supreme Federal Court lifts its ban on X after the latter complies with conditions to end its suspension and settles around $5.2 million in fines.
- 9 October – Rosita Milesi, a Scalabrinian nun, is awarded the Nansen Refugee Award by the United Nations High Commissioner for Refugees, citing her work as a “lawyer, social worker and movement builder” helping internally displaced and stateless people in the past 40 years.
- 12 October – Seven people die in an overnight storm in São Paulo State.
- 23 October – A riot in Rio de Janeiro related to a Copa Libertadores semi-final match between Botafogo and Penarol leads to the arrest of more than 250 Uruguayan supporters of the latter team.
- 27 October:
  - 2024 Brazilian municipal elections (second round)
    - 2024 São Paulo mayoral election (second round): Ricardo Nunes is reelected mayor.
  - One person dies and 12 others are injured in an attack by Palmeiras ultras on a bus carrying Cruzeiro supporters in Mairiporã, São Paulo State.
- 29 October – The Brazilian Institute of Environment and Renewable Natural Resources (IBAMA) imposes fines totaling $64 million in fines against 23 meatpacking companies and their suppliers, including JBS, for buying and selling up to 18,000 heads of cattle raised illegally on deforested land in the Amazon.
- 31 October – Two former police officers are sentenced to up to 79 years' imprisonment for the assassination of Marielle Franco in 2018.

=== November ===
- 5 November – Valdecy Urquiza is elected as secretary general of Interpol, the first person outside Europe or the United States to assume the position.
- 8 November – A tentative witness in a criminal case involving the Primeiro Comando da Capital is killed in a shooting at São Paulo/Guarulhos International Airport.
- 9 November – Total Linhas Aéreas Flight 5682: A
- 13 November – A suicide bomber detonates himself and one other bomb near the Supreme Federal Court in Brasília after failing to enter the building. No other casualties are recorded.
- 14 November – A court in Belo Horizonte clears Samarco, Vale, and BHP of responsibility over the Mariana dam disaster in 2015.
- 18–19 November – 2024 G20 Rio de Janeiro summit
- 19 November – Five members of the security forces are arrested on suspicion of plotting to assassinate President Lula, Vice President Geraldo Alckmin and Supreme Federal Court Justice Alexandre de Moraes as part of a coup d'état.
- 24 November – 17 people die when a bus falls off a ravine in Alagoas.

=== December ===
- 4 December – Minas cheese is recognized by UNESCO as an Intangible cultural heritage.
- 7 December – Three Federal Highway Police officers are convicted and sentenced to between 23 and 28 years imprisonment for the killing of Genivaldo de Jesus in 2022.
- 14 December – Former defense minister Walter Braga Netto is arrested on charges relating to the 2022 Brazilian coup plot.
- 21 December – 2024 Minas Gerais road crash: A multiple-vehicle collision between a passenger bus, a car and a B-double road train in Teofilo Otoni, Minas Gerais; 39 people die and 7 others are injured.
- 22 December –
  - 2024 Gramado Piper PA-42 crash: A Piper PA-42 crashes into a built-up area in Gramado, Rio Grande do Sul; all ten people on board die.
  - A bridge over the Tocantins River connecting Estreito, Maranhão and Aguiarnópolis, Tocantins collapses and takes down ten vehicles along with it; 13 people die and four others are missing.
- 23 December – Three people die after eating a cake laced with arsenic in Torres, Rio Grande do Sul.

== Art and entertainment ==
- List of Brazilian submissions for the Academy Award for Best International Feature Film

== Holidays ==
- 1 January – New Year's Day
- 12–13 February – Carnival
- 29 March – Good Friday
- 21 April – Tiradentes's Day
- 1 May – Labour Day
- 30 May – Feast of Corpus Christi
- 7 September – Independence Day
- 12 October – Our Lady of Aparecida
- 2 November – All Souls' Day
- 15 November – Republic Day
- 20 November – Black Consciousness Day
- 25 December – Christmas Day

== Deaths ==
=== January ===
- 4 January – Denise Assunção, 67, actress (Hoje É Dia de Maria), singer and songwriter.
- 5 January – Mário Zagallo, 92, football player (Flamengo, Botafogo) and manager (national team).
- 6 January – Campos Machado, 84, lawyer and politician.
- 10 January – Walmir Amaral, 84, comic artist (The Phantom).
- 12 January – Paulo Roberto, 71, footballer (Fluminense de Feira, Vasco da Gama, Goiás).
- 13 January – Edemar Cid Ferreira, 80, economist, banker, and art collector.
- 21 January – Sérgio Rodrigues da Costa Silva, 44, militia leader.
- 22 January – Antônio Henrique Cunha Bueno, 74, politician, deputy (1975–2003)
- 25 January – Deodoro, 74, footballer (Portuguesa, Clube Atlético Juventus, Coritiba).
- 28 January:
  - Walter Ivan de Azevedo, 97, Roman Catholic prelate, bishop of São Gabriel da Cachoeira (1986–2002).
  - Marcelo Cecé, 88, politician.
- 29 January – Samuel Pinheiro Guimarães, 84, diplomat, secretary-general of foreign affairs (2003–2009).
- 30 January – Jandira Martini, 78, actress (O Clone, América, Caminho das Índias).

=== May ===
- 8 May – Saudade Braga, 75, politician, mother of Glauber Braga

=== August ===
- 17 August – Silvio Santos, 93, entertainer, founder of SBT.

=== September ===
- 6 September – Sérgio Mendes, 83, musician.

== See also ==
- Mercosur
- Organization of American States
- Organization of Ibero-American States
- Community of Portuguese Language Countries
