= North–South Railway (Brazil) =

Railway line in Brazil

North-South Railway
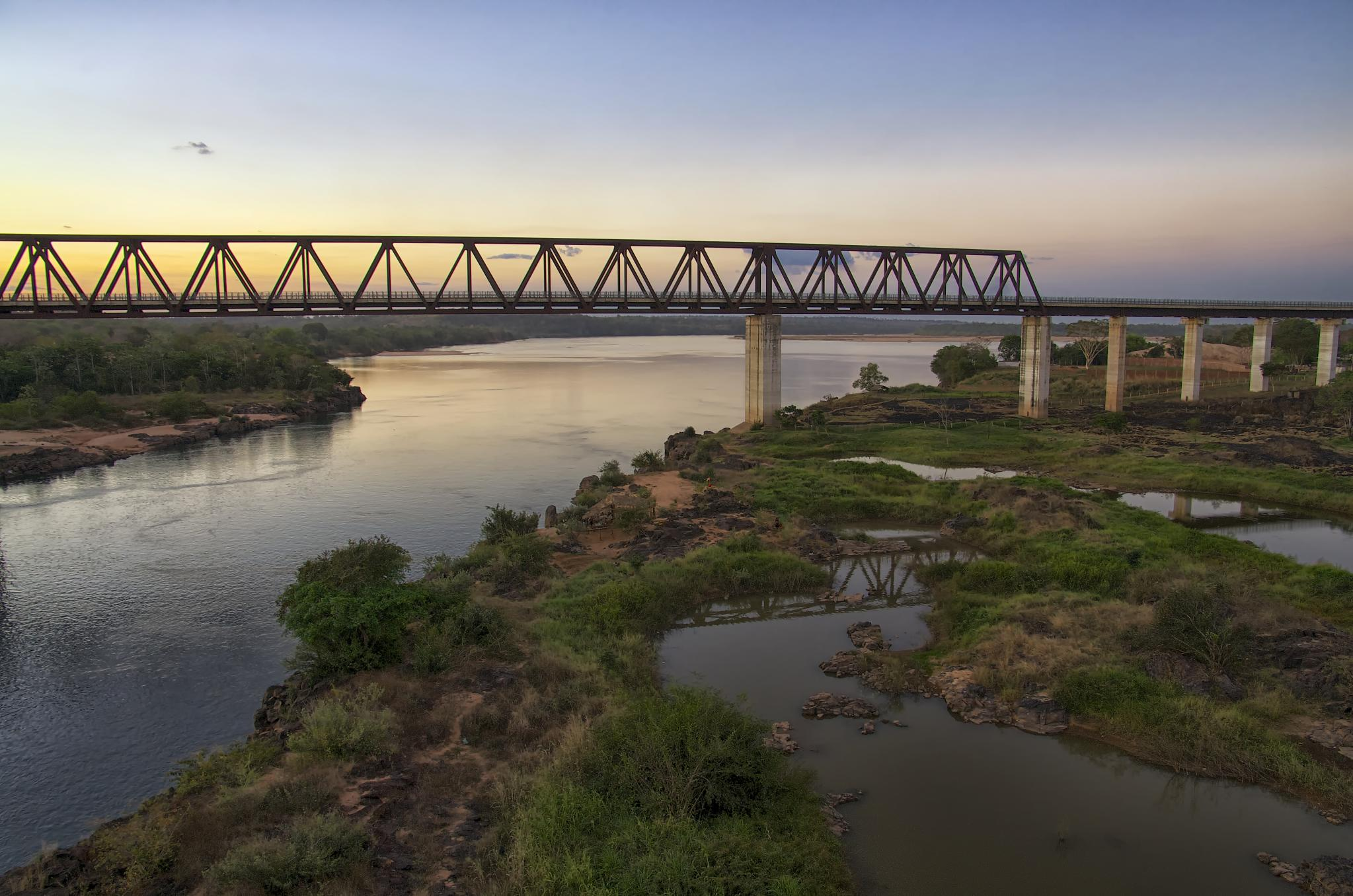
- View of the Estreito MA Railroad Bridge, part of the North-South Railway

Overview
- Other name: EF-151
- Native name: Ferrovia Norte-Sul
- Locale: Brazil
- Termini: Açailândia; Estrela d'Oeste

Service
- Type: Heavy rail
- Operators: VLI Multimodal S.A. (Maranhão–Tocantins); Rumo Logística (Tocantins–São Paulo)

History
- Work began: 1987; 39 years ago
- Opened: 1996; 30 years ago

Technical
- Line length: 2,184 kilometres (1,357 mi) (Açailândia–Estrela d'Oeste)
- Track gauge: 1,600 mm (5 ft 3 in)

North-South Railway (Portuguese: Ferrovia Norte-Sul), also known as EF-151, is a Brazilian longitudinal broad-gauge railroad. It was designed to connect the lines that provide access to Brazil's main ports and producing areas, which had been regionally isolated. Once completed, it will cover 4,155 kilometers and cross the states of Pará, Maranhão, Tocantins, Goiás, Minas Gerais, São Paulo, Mato Grosso do Sul, Paraná, Santa Catarina and Rio Grande do Sul.

Its current route stretches between Açailândia (MA) and Estrela d'Oeste (SP). The section between Açailândia (MA) and Porto Nacional (TO) belongs to the VLI Multimodal S.A. concessionaire, and the one between Rio Verde (GO) and Estrela d'Oeste (SP) belongs to the Rumo Logística concessionaire. The stretch between Açailândia (MA) and Anápolis (GO) was completed in 2014, while the stretch between Ouro Verde de Goiás (GO) and Estrela d'Oeste (SP) was completed in 2023.

The northern extension has two projects filed with the Ministry of Infrastructure, one by Minerva Participações e Investimentos and one by VALE. The southern extension continues under development with no date for execution.

== Features ==
The North-South Railway connects with the Carajás Railway in Açailândia (MA), which leads to the port of Itaqui. Departing from Porto Franco (MA), it will connect with the Transnordestina Railway, currently under construction by Transnordestina Logística S.A., after implementation of the line to Eliseu Martins (PI), which will provide alternative access to the ports of Suape (PE) and Pecém (CE). It will also connect with the West-East Integration Railway (FIOL) in Figueirópolis (TO) and with the Trans-Amazonian Railway in Mara Rosa (GO). In Anápolis (GO), north–south connects with the Central-Atlantic Railway, which operates in metre-gauge and requires transshipment. At Estrela d'Oeste (SP), the railroad connects with Rumo Logística's Malha Paulista, which provides access to the port of Santos and the economic and industrial hub of São Paulo. From the Malha Paulista, it is also possible to access Ferronorte, which continues to Mato Grosso.

The North-South Railway has a minimum curve radius of 343 meters and a maximum ramp of 0.6%, which allows a maximum speed of 83 kilometers per hour. Throughout a portion of its route in Goiás, Tocantins and Maranhão, the railroad runs parallel to the Belém-Brasília highway (BR-153; BR-226 and BR-010) and the Tocantins River. On the border between the states of Goiás and Minas Gerais, it crosses the Paranaíba River, which is part of the Tietê-Paraná Waterway.

== History ==
The North-South Railway was first discussed in 1985 during José Sarney government. The initial route envisaged a length of approximately 1,550 kilometers between Açailândia (MA) and Anápolis (GO). Work on the first stretch of 215 kilometers between Açailândia (MA) and Porto Franco (MA) began in 1987 and ended in 1996 under Fernando Henrique Cardoso administration. During the first term of President Luiz Inácio Lula da Silva, the construction of the railroad to Porto Nacional (TO) and Anápolis (GO) restarted. The first stretch of 146 kilometers between Porto Franco (MA) and Araguaína (TO) was inaugurated in 2007.

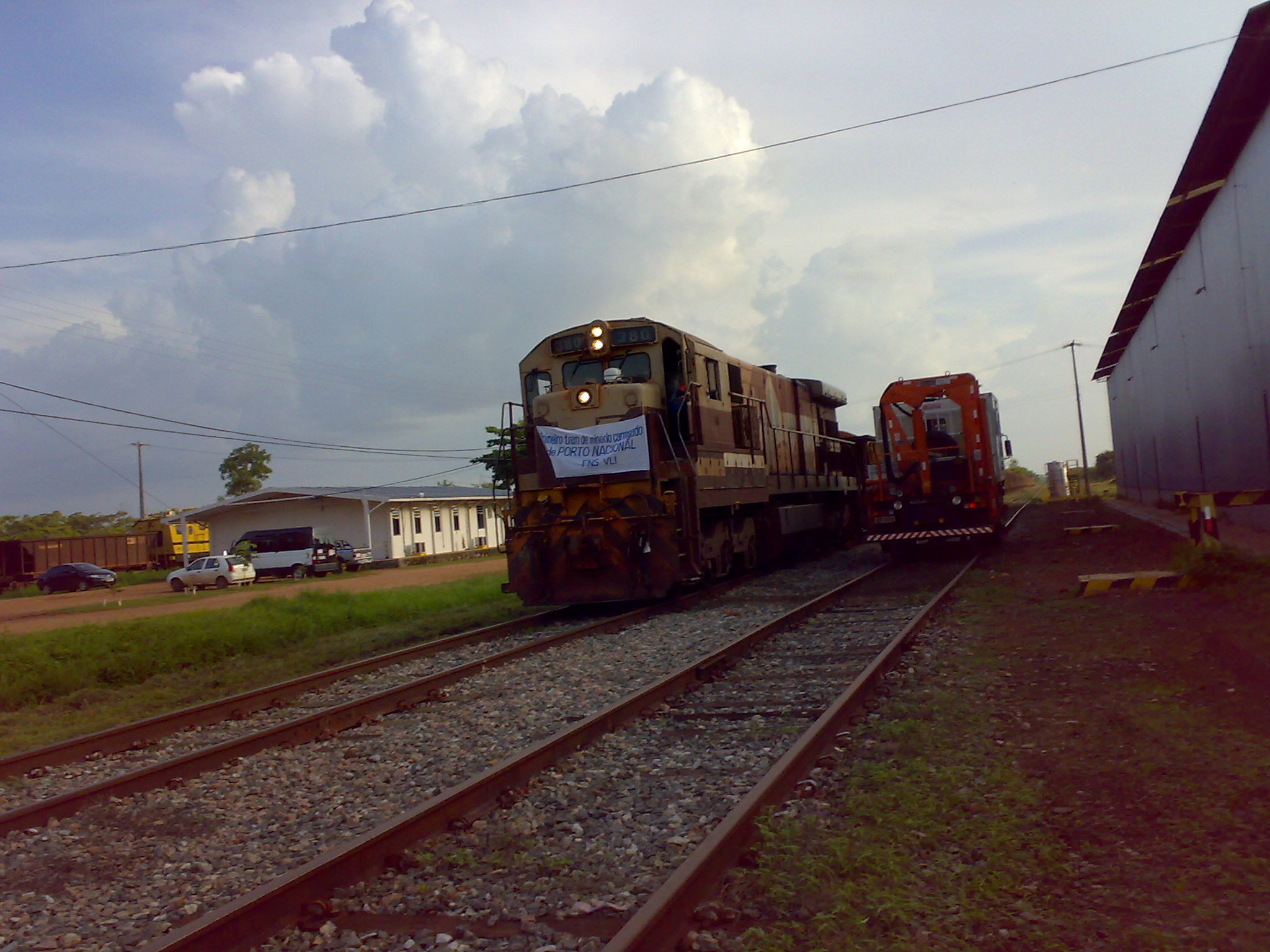
First train pulling iron ore loaded in Porto Nacional at North-South Railway. The previous trains were loaded in Guaraí.

In October 2007, the operation of the stretch of the North-South Railway between Açailândia (MA) and Porto Nacional (TO) was granted to Vale S.A. for a 30-year period. The company offered the minimum amount of R$1.478 billion, with half being paid on December 21, 2007, and the other half divided into two installments. The stretch granted covered 722 kilometers, but only 361 kilometers between Açailândia (MA) and Araguaína (TO) had been completed by October 2007. The money provided by the concession enabled the construction of the portion of 359 kilometers between Araguaína (TO) and Porto Nacional (TO).

In December 2008, a 490 kilometer stretch between Açailândia (MA) and Colinas (TO) was completed. In March 2010, the 133 kilometer stretch between Colinas (TO) and Guaraí (TO) was inaugurated. The stretch between Colinas (TO) and Porto Nacional (TO), originally scheduled to be inaugurated in September 2010 by President Luiz Inácio Lula da Silva, began running at the end of 2012. In 2011, Vale S.A. dismembered the north–south operation, merged it with the Central-Atlantic Railway and established a company dedicated to logistics called VLI Multimodal S.A., which began to operate and manage the Açailândia (MA) and Porto Nacional (TO) stretch.

In January 2011, work began on the 684 kilometer segment between Ouro Verde de Goiás (GO) and Estrela d'Oeste (SP). It was the first route outside of the initial project, which had been designed to reach Anápolis (GO) and was modified to extend to the port of Rio Grande (RS). The 855 kilometer section between Porto Nacional (TO) and Anápolis (GO), scheduled for 2010, was delivered in 2014 by President Dilma Rousseff without any operational terminal, which required investments of R$700 million in intermodal freight yards, viaducts and signage by the new operator. The segment between Ouro Verde de Goiás (GO) and Estrela d'Oeste (SP), scheduled for conclusion in the second half of 2018, was delivered 95% complete.

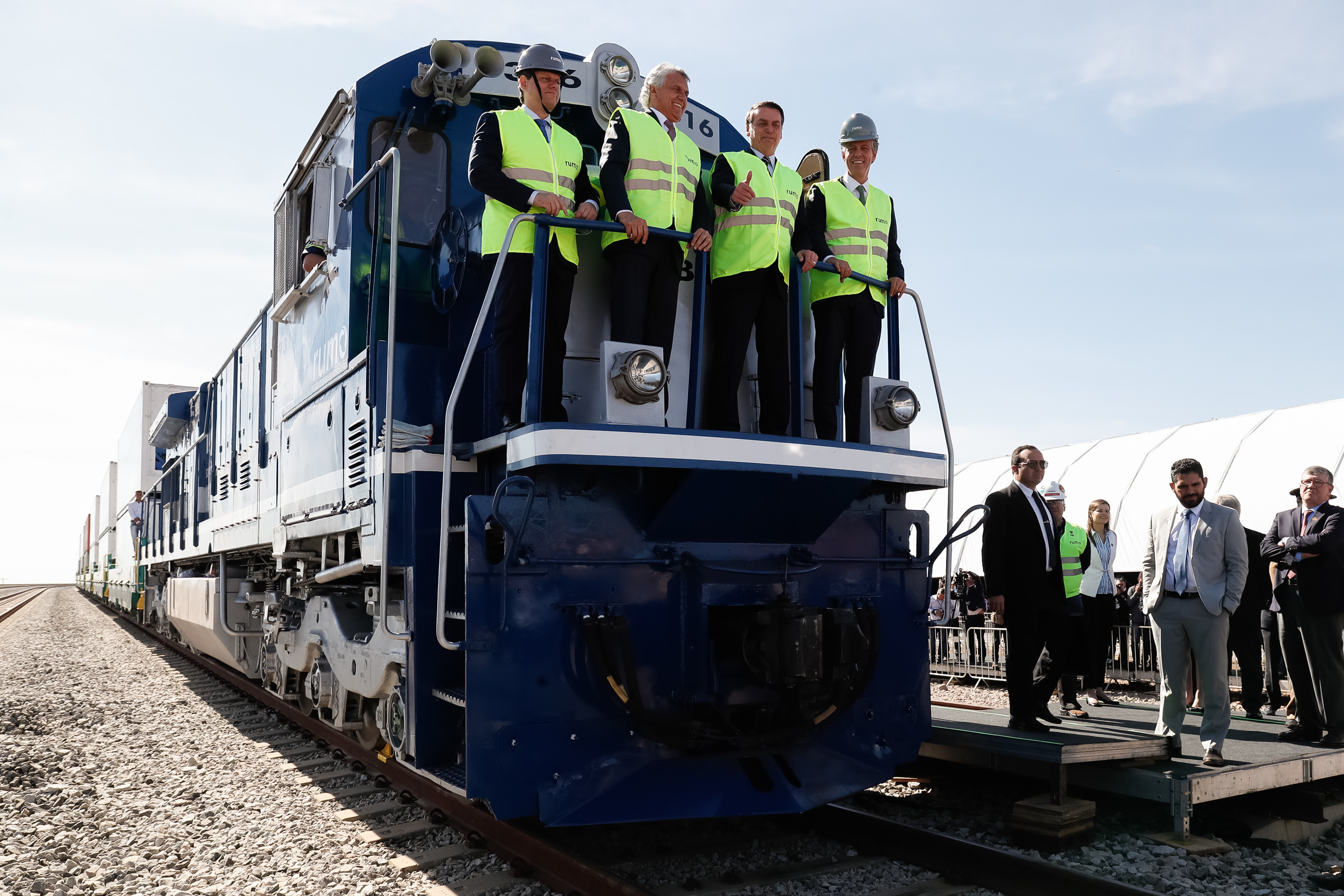
Signing ceremony for the concession contract for the central stretch of the North-South Railway with Rumo Logística on July 31, 2019.

On July 20, 2018, President Michel Temer signed Provisional Measure 845, which established the National Railway Development Fund (Fundo Nacional de Desenvolvimento Ferroviário - FNDF). It guaranteed that the entire amount paid for the concession of the stretch of the North-South Railway between Porto Nacional (TO) and Estrela d'Oeste (SP) would be allocated to the construction of the northern extension, connecting Açailândia (MA) to the port of Vila do Conde, in Barcarena (PA).

On March 28, 2019, the Jair Bolsonaro government auctioned off the 1,537 kilometer central stretch of the North-South Railway between Porto Nacional (TO) and Estrela d'Oeste (SP). Rumo Logística acquired the railroad for R$2,719,530,000 for a 30-year non-extendable concession contract, signed in Goiás on July 31, 2019.

On March 4, 2021, Rumo launched operations on the stretch between São Simão (GO) and Estrela d'Oeste (SP) after investments of R$711 million. A terminal was built in São Simão with a storage capacity of 42,000 tons and a transport capacity of 5.5 million tons of soybeans, corn and soybean meal per year. On May 29, 2021, the first train loaded with soybeans left the Multimodal Terminal in Rio Verde (GO) for the port of Santos. On June 9, 2022, the Iturama sugar terminal in the Triângulo Mineiro started operating in partnership with Usina Coruripe. On May 25, 2023, Rumo Logistica concluded the 50 kilometers of track remaining for the connection of the railroad between the towns of Goianira and Ouro Verde (GO).

== Route ==
Section	Beginning of works	Length (km)	Length from Açailândia (km)	Inauguration date	Observations and connections
Barcarena (PA) - Açailândia (MA)	Undefined	477	450	Undefined	Section included in the Federal Government's Pro-Trails Program (Programa Pró Trilhos). Construction and operation of the stretch by Minerva Participações e Investimentos S/A.
Açailândia (MA) - Porto Franco (MA)	1987	215	215	1996	Connects with: Carajás Railway in Açailândia (MA); MA-122 near João Lisboa (MA), BR-010 near Imperatriz (MA); MA-138 near Porto Franco (MA); 28 kilometers railroad branch line linking Suzano's factory in Imperatriz to the track.
Porto Franco (MA) - Aguiarnópolis (TO)	Unknown	42	247	2007	Connects with: bridge over the Tocantins River between the cities of Estreito (MA) and Aguiarnópolis (TO); BR-226 near Aguiarnópolis (TO).
Aguiarnópolis (TO) - Araguaína (TO)	Unknown	114	361	2007	Crosses the Araguaína/Babaçulândia Multimodal Yard (TO)
Araguaína (TO) - Colinas do Tocantins (TO)	Unknown	153	514	2008	Crosses the Colinas Multimodal Yard (TO)
Colinas do Tocantins (TO) - Guaraí (TO)	Unknown	100	514	2010	Crosses the Guaraí Multimodal Yard (TO)
Guaraí (TO) - Palmas (TO)	2007	150	764	2010	Crosses the Palmas/Porto Nacional Multimodal Yard near the Luzimangues district (Porto Nacional - TO)
Palmas (TO) - Uruaçu (GO)	2008	456	1220	2012	Connects with: West-East Railway in Figueirópolis (TO); Center-West Integration Railway in Mara Rosa (GO). Crosses the Gurupi Multimodal Terminal (TO).
Uruaçu (GO) - Anápolis (GO)	2008	280	1500	2014	Connects with the Central-Atlantic Railway in Anápolis (GO)
Ouro Verde (GO) - Estrela D'Oeste (SP)	2011	684	2184	2021	Connects with the Malha Paulista. Terminals in Rio Verde (GO), Iturama and São Simão (MG)
Estrela D'Oeste (SP) - Panorama (SP)	Undefined	264	2548	Undefined	Project in progress
Panorama (SP) - Chapecó (SC)	Undefined	951	3499	Undefined	Studies in progress
Chapecó (SC) - Rio Grande (RS)	Undefined	833	4332	Undefined	Studies in progress

=== Southern Extension ===
The segment under study linking Panorama (SP) and Rio Grande (RS) is currently called the Southern Extension (Prolongamento Sul). It was divided into two sections:

- Panorama (SP) to Chapecó (SC), 951 kilometers;
- Chapecó (SC) to Rio Grande (RS), 833 kilometers;

Originally, the stretch linking Panorama (SP) and Porto Murtinho (MS), labeled EF-267, was called the Southern Extension of the North-South Railway. On May 8, 2008, it was included in the National Road Plan, not as part of the north–south, but as a railroad that will connect to it, called the Pantanal Railway.

=== North Extension ===
The stretch linking the port of Vila do Conde in Barcarena (PA) and Açailândia (MA) is called the Northern Extension (Prolongamento Norte) of the North-South Railway. On December 23, 2021, Minerva Participações e Investimentos S.A. signed the contract for the construction and operation of the stretch. On February 3, 2022, the Ministry of Infrastructure signed a contract with 3G Empreendimentos e Consultoria Ltda. for the construction of the section between Barcarena and Santana do Araguaia (PA). The companies' projects coincide in the municipalities of Barcarena and Rondon do Pará (PA).

=== Branch lines ===
Currently, the railroad includes two branch lines:

- A private section approximately 25 kilometers long owned by Suzano Papel e Celulose that connects its factory in Imperatriz (MA) to the North-South Railway in João Lisboa (MA);
- A section in Anápolis approximately 50 kilometers long that connects the North-South Railway in Ouro Verde de Goiás (GO) to the Agroindustrial District of Anápolis (GO), where it joins the metre-gauge network of the Central-Atlantic Railway.

== Operational stretches ==
=== Porto Nacional (TO) to Açailândia (MA) ===
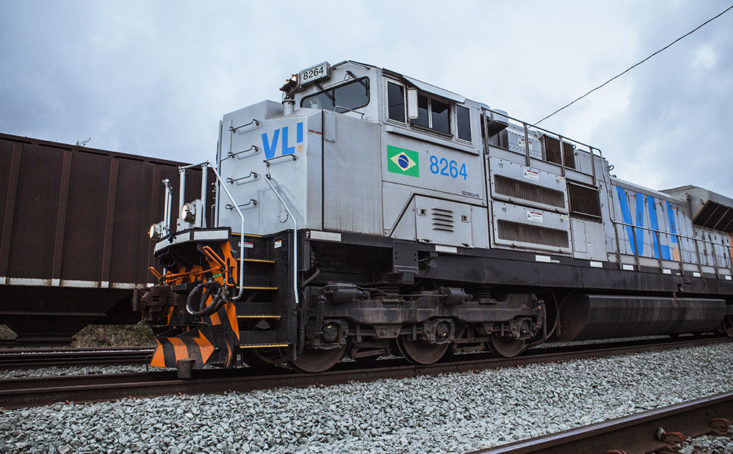
VLI locomotive 8264 (EMD SD70), in São Luís (MA).

The 720-kilometer stretch between Porto Nacional (TO) and Açailândia (MA) is operated by VLI Multimodal S.A., owner of the Ferrovia Norte-Sul S/A. concessionaire. Compared to the use of trucks, the route saves 8% on grain transportation to the port of Itaqui. It mainly transports soybeans (55%), cellulose (25%) and fuels (10%). The trip between Porto Nacional and the Port of Itaqui lasts 3.5 days on average.

The main product is soybeans, which are shipped from Porto Franco (MA) and Colinas do Tocantins (TO). It also transports pulp for Suzano Maranhão, which built its own 28 kilometer branch line from the factory in Imperatriz (MA) to the railroad destined for the port of Itaqui. It runs fuel transportation from São Luís to the terminal in Porto Nacional and plans to ship alcohol from Tocantins to the port of Itaqui. The volume handled by the terminal rose from 110 million to 270 million liters of fuel from 2014 to 2016.

Between 2012 and 2015, grain flow increased from 2.6 to 4.2 million tons, 55% of the total volume transported on the stretch. The Porto Nacional Integrator Terminal has a storage capacity of 60,000 tons of grain and can process 2.6 million tons a year. The Palmeirante Terminal (TO) holds a 90,000 ton warehouse and can dispatch up to 3.4 million tons a year. The stretch is able to transport up to 9 million tons of grain a year, but suffers from a shortage of access roads to the tracks.

From 2014 to 2017, 11.7 million tons of grain were shipped between Porto Nacional (TO) and the port of Itaqui. From January to October 2017, 5.5 million tons of grain were transported, 30% more than 2015. In April 2017, an axis that crosses 4 kilometers of the Araguaia River for trucks bound for Porto Nacional by ferry from Santana do Araguaia (PA) to Caseara (TO) began operating, which reduced travel times and increased the volume received from the east and northeast of Mato Grosso and the south of Pará by 7%. Between January and October 2017, the port of Itaqui transported 1.184 million tons of pulp and paper produced by the Suzano Papel e Celulose unit in Imperatriz (MA), delivered by the north–south and Carajás railroads.

In 2018, it transported 6.3 million tons of soybeans, corn and soybean meal to the port of Itaqui. In 2019, the volume was 7.9 million tons of grain, from eastern and northeastern Mato Grosso, southern Pará and MATOPIBA (Maranhão, Tocantins, Piauí and Bahia), the new agricultural hotspot; an increase of 25% on the previous year.

=== Porto Nacional (TO) to Anápolis (GO) ===
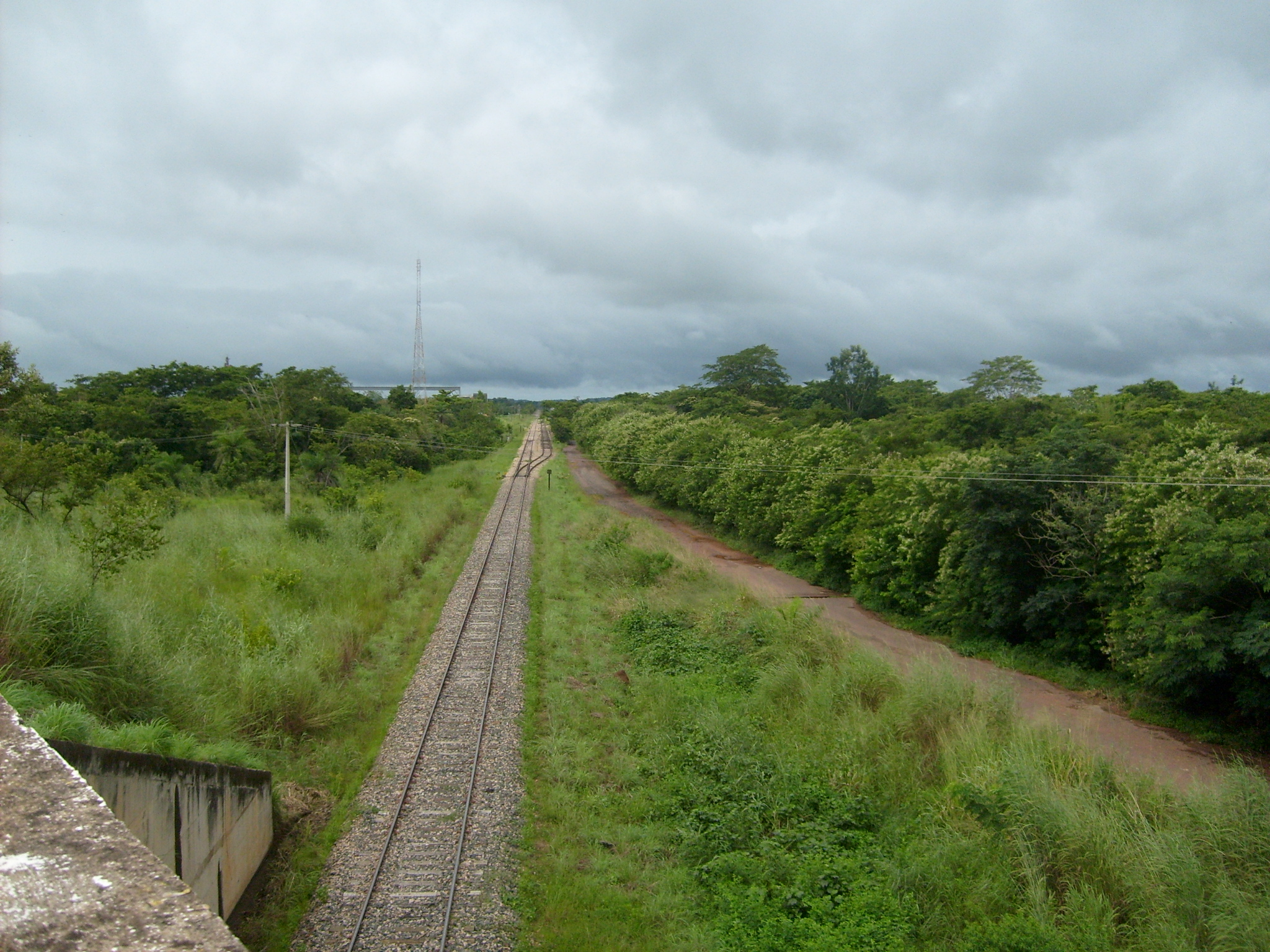
North-South Railway at intersection with Belém-Brasília Highway, in Imperatriz (MA)..

Since its inauguration until the concession, the stretch between Porto Nacional and Anapólis, under VALEC's management, has transported 18 locomotives (February 2015), 26,000 tons of soybean meal (December 2015), 13,000 tons of shredded wood (December 2016 to March 2017), 8,000 tons of manganese ore (October 2017) and 62 bars of rail measuring 240 meters each (December 2017). The capacity to transport new cargo through this section was limited by the lack of terminals and the inability to get the cargo to a port, constrained by the capacity on the Carajás Railway, which could only absorb new trains after the duplication was completed in 2018.

=== Ouro Verde de Goiás (GO) to Estrela d'Oeste (SP) ===
In the first half of 2021, Rumo Logística launched operations on the Central-South extension of the North-South Railway and built two terminals. In São Simão (GO), a terminal with a static capacity of 42,000 tons and a transport capacity of 5.5 million tons of soybeans, corn and soybean meal per year was constructed with investments of R$711 million. In Rio Verde (GO), a large Multimodal Terminal for soybeans and fertilizers with the capacity to handle 11 million tons per year was built. On June 9, 2022, Rumo Logística and Usina Coruripe inaugurated a sugar terminal in Iturama (MG) capable of handling 2 million tons of export sugar per year. The Santa Helena de Goiás Multimodal Terminal is under construction by Infra S.A.

The entire stretch between Porto Nacional (TO) and Estrela d'Oeste (SP) became fully operational in June 2023.

== See also ==
- Rail transport in Brazil
