= Oropouche =

Oropouche or Oropuche can refer to:

- Cumaca Cave
- Oropouche (constituency), a constituency in the parliament of Trinidad and Tobago
- Oropouche fever
- Oropouche orthobunyavirus, a species of virus
- Oropouche River
- Oropouche East (parliamentary constituency), a constituency in the parliament of Trinidad and Tobago
- Oropouche West (parliamentary constituency), a constituency in the parliament of Trinidad and Tobago
- South Oropouche, a community in Trinidad and Tobago
