= 2023–2024 Oropouche virus disease outbreak =

Disease outbreak

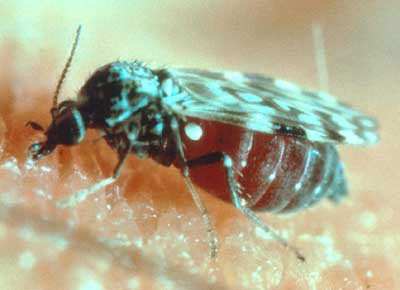
- A biting midge, a known vector for the Oropouche virus
- Disease: Oropouche fever
- Date: December 2023 - ongoing
- Confirmed cases: 11,634+
- Deaths: 2

An outbreak of Oropouche fever began in December 2023. Over 9,852 infections have been reported, including the first outside the Amazon region to which Oropouche virus is endemic.

Although most cases have occurred in Brazil, local transmission has also been reported in Bolivia, Peru, Colombia, and Cuba. Cases among travelers to the region have been identified in the United States and Europe. As of August 16, two fatalities were reported. These are the first known deaths caused by Oropouche. Cases of vertical transmission to fetuses have been identified, resulting in stillbirths and possibly microcephaly.

== Virus and epidemiology ==
The causative agent of Oropouche fever, Oropouche virus, was first discovered in the Caribbean nation Trinidad and Tobago. Five years later, it was first detected in Brazil via an infected sloth. Consequently, the disease is also known as "sloth fever". Sloths, in addition to some bird species and non-human primates, are known to serve as natural reservoirs for the virus. Since the 1960s, periodic outbreaks have occurred, albeit only in the Amazon region.

Unlike the mosquito-borne dengue or Zika, the Oropouche virus is transmitted by a biting midge, specifically Culicoides paraensis. C. paraensis is also found throughout the United States. Although no other vector has been demonstrated, the virus has been identified in insects such as the Culex quinquefasciatus mosquito.

Historically, the disease results in mild symptoms: fever, headache, nausea, vomiting, and muscle, joint, or eye pain. Some cases may result in severe neurological damage. No vaccines or treatments exist.

== Outbreak ==
According to the U.S. Centers for Disease Control and Prevention (CDC), over 8000 Oropouche cases were identified from January 1 to August 1, 2024. Although most cases have occurred in Brazil, cases have also been reported in Bolivia, Peru, Colombia, and Cuba. The Cuban infections mark the first Oropouche cases beyond the Amazon. As of August 16, 2024 two fatalities had been reported. These are the first known deaths caused by the disease. In early August 2024, the Pan American Health Organization updated the disease's risk level from moderate to high.

On August 16 2024, the CDC issued a health alert for the region. It reported that 21 Americans had contracted the virus after traveling to Cuba, three were hospitalized, and no deaths had occurred. Travel-associated cases have also occurred in Italy, Germany, and Spain.

By the end of January, 2025, there were 20,000 cases in the Americas.

=== Fetal transmission ===
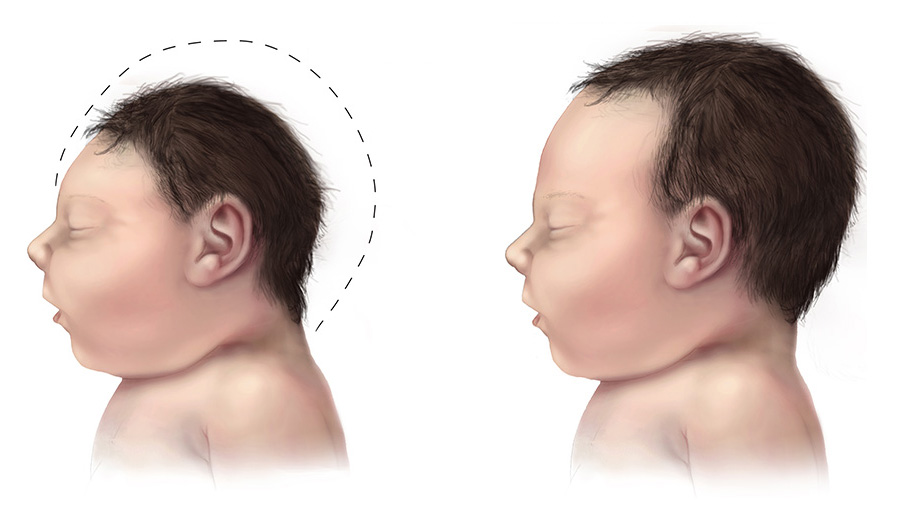
Microcephaly, which severely affects brain development, has been indicated in some Oropouche infections.

Five Oropouche cases have involved probable vertical transmission of the virus from pregnant mother to fetus. Brazilian health authorities have been investigating the possibility of stillborns and birth defects that the disease may have caused. In the state of Pará, the Evandro Chagas Institute identified antibodies against Oropouche in four newborns with microcephaly: a birth defect characterized by an abnormally small head. As of 2024, a causal relationship had not been confirmed.

Viruses closely related to Oropouche—such as Akabane virus—are known to induce birth defects or stillborns in livestock.

== Causes ==
Climate change, deforestation, and urbanization have been suggested as possible contributing factors to the Oropouche outbreak. The current economic crisis in Cuba—which has halted mosquito control efforts and forced many Cubans to sleep with open windows due to power outages—has also been cited.

It has been suggested that the current outbreak is due to a more pathogenic Oropouche strain: genetic analysis has identified it as a reassortment of strains previously identified in Peru and Columbia. It has also been suggested that the virus simply appears more pathogenic due to the widespread presence of immunity against Oropouche in the Amazon region.
