= Luís Paulo (footballer, born 1977) =

Brazilian footballer

Personal information
- Full name: Luís Paulo Santos de Souza
- Date of birth: 10 July 1977 (age 49)
- Place of birth: Figueirópolis, Brazil
- Height: 1.65 m (5 ft 5 in)
- Position: Right back

Senior career*
| Years | Team | Apps | (Gls) |
| 1997–1999 | Goiás | | |
| 1999 | Botafogo | | |
| 2000 | São Paulo | | |
| 2001 | Caxias | | |
| 2002 | Paraná | | |
| 2003 | Paulista | | |
| 2004 | Criciúma | | |
| 2005 | Paysandu | | |
| 2005 | Caxias | | |
| 2006 | Iraty | | |
| 2006 | Coritiba | | |
| 2006–2007 | Santa Cruz | | |
| 2007 | Ceilândia | | |
| 2008 | Canedense | | |
| 2009 | Coruripe | | |
| 2009 | Poços de Caldas | | |
| 2009 | Juventus-SP | | |
| 2010–2011 | Aparecidense | | |
| 2011–2012 | Trindade | | |
- * Club domestic league appearances and goals as of 13 November 2023

Luís Paulo Santos de Souza (born 10 July 1977), also known as Luís Paulo, is a Brazilian former professional footballer who played as a right back.

== Career ==
Luís Paulo started his career in Goiás where he was state champion three times, and in 1999 he competed in the Campeonato Brasileiro for Botafogo FR.

In 2000, he was presented as a reinforcement for São Paulo FC alongside Evair. in the club, he gained the nickname "Luís Paulo ET" in reference to the character in Steven Spielberg's film E.T. the Extra-Terrestrial, with whom he had a great physical similarity at the time.

He also played for Criciúma, Coritiba, Paysandu and Santa Cruz with some prominence.

== Honours ==
Goiás

- Campeonato Goiano: 1997, 1998, 1999

São Paulo

- Campeonato Paulista: 2000

Paysandu

- Campeonato Paraense: 2005

Aparecidense

- Campeonato Goiano Second Division: 2010
