= Microregion of Fernandópolis =

- Microregion
- Location of the Microregion of Fernandópolis
- Coordinates: 20°17′02″S 50°14′45″W
- Country: Brazil
- Region: Southeast
- State: São Paulo
- Mesoregion: São José do Rio Preto

Area
  - Total: 2,811.7 km^{2} (1,085.6 sq mi)

Population (2010/IBGE)
  - Total: 104,623
  - Density: 37.210/km^{2} (96.373/sq mi)
- Time zone: UTC-3 (UTC-3)
  - Summer (DST): UTC-2 (UTC-2)
- Postal Code: 15600-000
- Area code: +55 17

The Microregion of Fernandópolis (Portuguese: Microrregião de Fernandópolis) is located on the northwest of São Paulo state, Brazil, and is made up of 13 municipalities. It belongs to the Mesoregion of São José do Rio Preto.

The microregion has a population of 104,623 inhabitants, in an area of 2,811.7 km²

== Municipalities ==
The microregion consists of the following municipalities, listed below with their 2010 Census populations (IBGE/2010):

- Estrela d'Oeste: 8,208
- Fernandópolis: 64,696
- Guarani d'Oeste: 1,970
- Indiaporã: 3,903
- Macedônia: 3,664
- Meridiano: 3,885
- Mira Estrela: 2,820
- Ouroeste: 8,405
- Pedranópolis: 2,558
- São João das Duas Pontes: 2,566
- Turmalina: 1,978

== See also ==
- Interior of São Paulo
