= Macedônia =

- Municipality
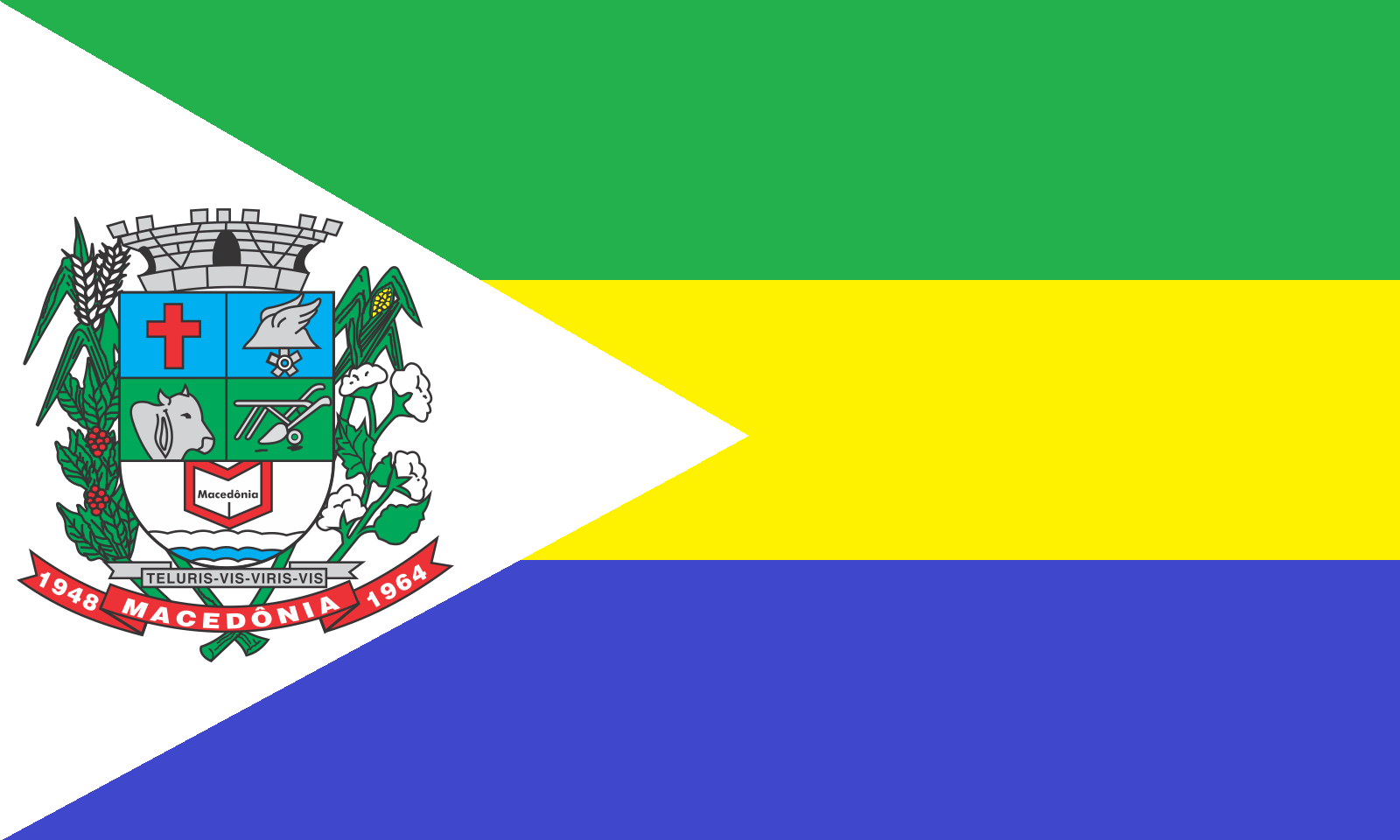
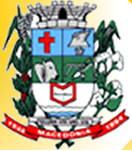
- Flag Coat of arms

- Location in São Paulo state

- Location in Brazil
- Coordinates: 20°8′45″S 50°11′40″W
- Country: Brazil
- Region: Southeast
- State: São Paulo
- Mesoregion: São José do Rio Preto
- Microregion: Fernandópolis

Area
  - Total: 328 km^{2} (127 sq mi)

Population (2020)
  - Total: 3,692
  - Density: 11.3/km^{2} (29.2/sq mi)
- Time zone: UTC−3 (BRT)
- Website: www.macedonia.sp.gov.br

Macedônia is a municipality (município) in the Brazilian state of São Paulo. The population is 3,692 (2020 est.) in an area of 328 km^{2}. Its elevation is 502 m.

== Etymology ==
Municipality's name has derived from the ancient Greek Kingdom of Macedonia, of the same name.

== Media ==
In telecommunications, the city was served by Companhia de Telecomunicações do Estado de São Paulo until 1975, when it began to be served by Telecomunicações de São Paulo. In July 1998, this company was acquired by Telefónica, which adopted the Vivo brand in 2012.

The company is currently an operator of cell phones, fixed lines, internet (fiber optics/4G) and television (satellite and cable).

== See also ==
- List of municipalities in São Paulo
- Interior of São Paulo
