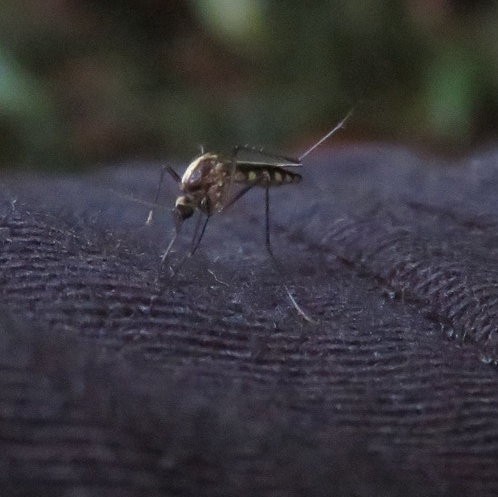

Scientific classification
- Kingdom: Animalia
- Phylum: Arthropoda
- Class: Insecta
- Order: Diptera
- Family: Culicidae
- Genus: Aedes
- Subgenus: Ochlerotatus
- Species: A. serratus

Binomial name
- Aedes serratus (Theobald, 1901)

Synonyms
- Ochlerotatus serratus (Theobald, 1901)

= Aedes serratus =

Species of mosquito

Aedes serratus is a species of mosquito that can spread Oropouche virus, as well as being a potential vectors of arboviruses, such as Venezuelan equine encephalitis virus, Melao virus, Ilheus virus, Rocio virus, yellow fever, Una virus, Aura virus, Wyeomyia virus, and Itupiranga virus. It is also known as Ochlerotatus serratus.

== See also ==
- Oropouche fever
