= Ouroeste =

- Municipality
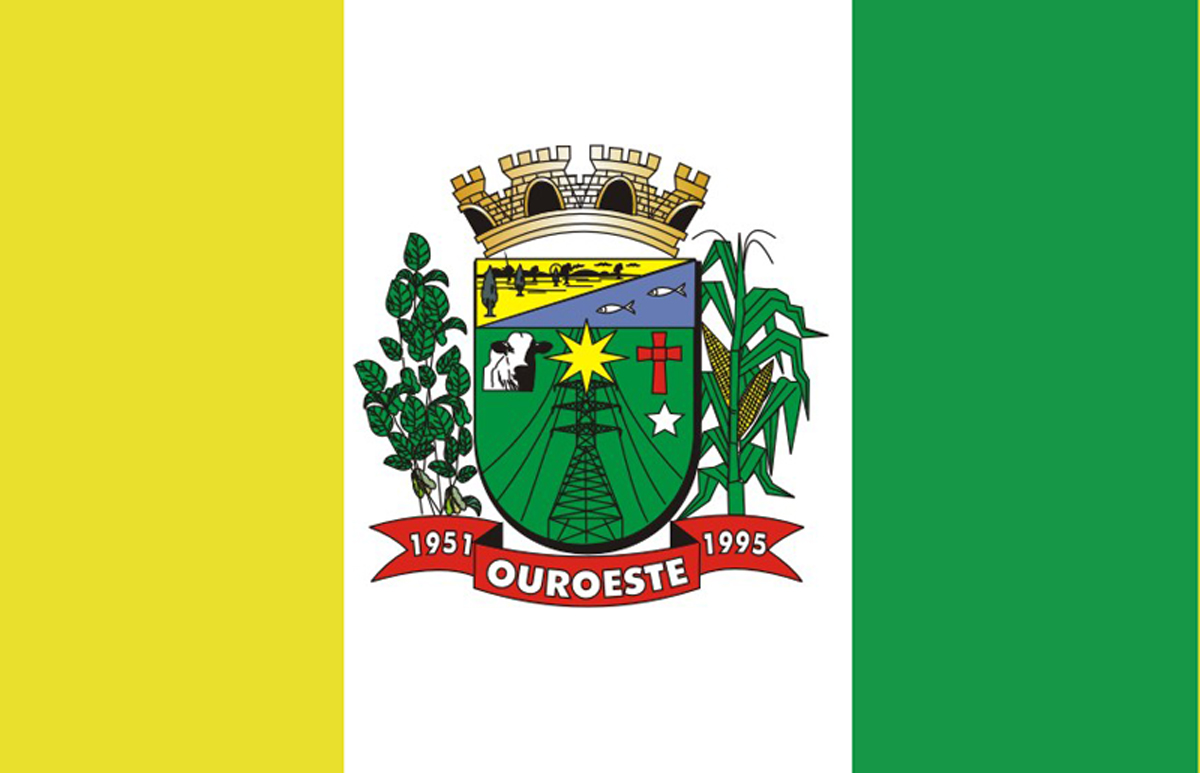
- Flag

- Location of Ouroeste

- Location within Brazil
- Coordinates: 20°00′03″S 50°22′19″W
- Country: Brazil
- Region: Southeast
- State: São Paulo
- Established: 2009

Area
  - Total: 288.8 km^{2} (111.5 sq mi)
- Elevation: 500 m (1,600 ft)

Population (2020)
  - Total: 10,539
  - Density: 36.49/km^{2} (94.51/sq mi)
- Time zone: UTC−3 (BRT)
- Postal Code: 15685-000
- Area code: +55 17
- Website: Prefecture of Ouroeste

Ouroeste is a municipality in the state of São Paulo, Brazil. It is located at an altitude of 500 meters. The city has a population of 10,539 inhabitants and an area of 288.8 km^{2} (111.5 sq mi).

Ouroeste belongs to the Mesoregion of São José do Rio Preto and the Microregion of Fernandópolis.

== History ==
Ouroeste has this name because its lands are fertile and are located in the northwest region of the state of São Paulo. It was founded on January 27, 1952 by João Velloso, owner of Fazenda Velloso, then located in the municipality of Guarani D'Oeste. In 1990, it was elevated to the district of Guarani D'Oeste. It became autonomous municipality on December 27, 1995.

== Mayors ==
Nelson Pinhel was the first mayor and vice-mayor Sebastião Geraldo da Silva in the mandate from 1997 to 2000. The second mayor elected was Edivaldo Fraga da Silva and deputy mayor Nelcides de Oliveira Rodrigues in the mandate from 2001 to 2004. The third mayor Nelson Pinhel and deputy mayor Sebastião Geraldo da Silva in the mandate from 2005 to 2008. The fourth mayor Nelson Pinhel and deputy mayor Sebastião Geraldo da Silva in the mandate from 2009 to 2012. The fifth mayor Sebastião Geraldo da Silva and deputy mayor Gilmar Manchi Lopes in the mandate from 2013 to 2016.

== Media ==
In telecommunications, the city was served by Companhia de Telecomunicações do Estado de São Paulo until 1973, when it began to be served by Telecomunicações de São Paulo. In July 1998, this company was acquired by Telefónica, which adopted the Vivo brand in 2012.

The company is currently an operator of cell phones, fixed lines, internet (fiber optics/4G) and television (satellite and cable).

== See also ==
- List of municipalities in São Paulo
- Interior of São Paulo
