= Estrela d'Oeste =

Municipality in the state of São Paulo in Brazil

- Municipality
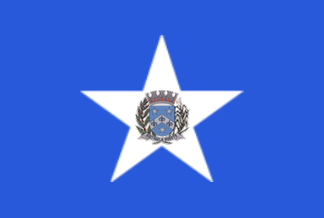
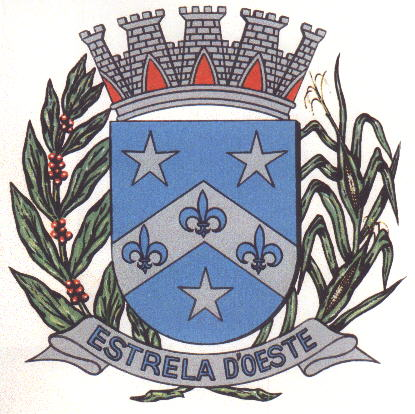
- Flag Coat of arms

- Location in São Paulo state

- Location in Brazil
- Coordinates: 20°17′16″S 50°24′03″W
- Country: Brazil
- Region: Southeast
- State: São Paulo

Area
  - Total: 296.3 km^{2} (114.4 sq mi)
- Elevation: 595 m (1,952 ft)

Population (2020)
  - Total: 8,419
  - Density: 28.41/km^{2} (73.59/sq mi)
- Time zone: UTC−3 (BRT)
- Postal code: 15650-000
- Area code: +55 17
- Website: www.pmestrela.sp.gov.br

Estrela d'Oeste is a municipality in the state of São Paulo, Brazil. The population is 8,419 (2020 est.) in an area of 296.3 km^{2}. Estrela d'Oeste belongs to the Mesoregion of São José do Rio Preto.

== History ==
The area of Estrela d´Oeste was first explored at the beginning of the 20th century. Settlement started in 1942, and in 1948 it became an independent municipality by separation from Fernandópolis.

Map of the state of São Paulo (1948).

== Demography ==
=== Census Data - 2010 ===
Total Population: 8208

- Urban: 6831
- Rural: 1377
- Men: 4133
- Women: 4075

Population density (inhabitants / Km ²): 27.69

=== Census Data - 2000 ===
- Infant mortality to 1 year (per thousand): 10.43
- Life expectancy (years): 74.42
- Fertility rate (children per woman): 1.96
- Literacy Rate: 87.26%
- Human Development Index (HDI): 0.792
- Income HDI: 0.705
- HDI Longevity: 0.824
- HDI Education: 0.848

(Source: IPEADATA)

== Media ==
In telecommunications, the city was served by Companhia de Telecomunicações do Estado de São Paulo until 1975, when it began to be served by Telecomunicações de São Paulo. In July 1998, this company was acquired by Telefónica, which adopted the Vivo brand in 2012.

The company is currently an operator of cell phones, fixed lines, internet (fiber optics/4G) and television (satellite and cable).

== See also ==
- List of municipalities in São Paulo
- Interior of São Paulo
