= São José do Jacuípe =

Coordinates: 11°30′S 40°02′W

- Municipality
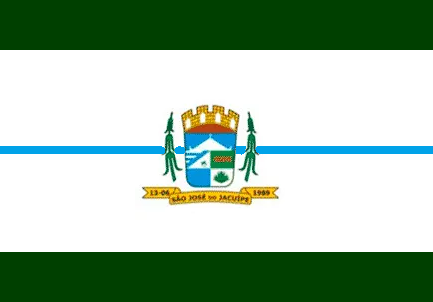
- Flag

- Country: Brazil
- Region: Nordeste
- State: Bahia

Population (2020)
  - Total: 10,505
- Time zone: UTC−3 (BRT)

São José do Jacuípe is a municipality in the state of Bahia in the North-East region of Brazil.

== See also ==
- List of municipalities in Bahia
