= Coritiba Crocodiles =

Brazilian American football team

The Coritiba Crocodiles are a professional Brazilian American football team headquartered in Curitiba, Paraná. Founded as the Barigui Crocodiles by a group of friends who used to watch NFL games, the team name originated from an alligator that lived in Parque Barigui's lake.

In 2008, they were the first Brazilian American Football team to play internationally, going up against the Emperadores from Uruguay.

In 2009, the Crocodiles played in the Pantanal Bowl, but unfortunately, did not emerge victorious, placing second.

On January 21, 2011, the Barigui Crocodiles merged with the Coritiba Foot Ball Club. It was decided that the two names would be mixed, creating the Coritiba Crocodiles.

Currently, Coritiba are the Brazilian champions, having won the Brazilian American Football championship in 2013, 2014 and 2022.

On 21 September 2024, three players of the team were killed after their bus overturned on their way to a match in Rio de Janeiro.

In 2025, he became a four-time Brazilian champion and won his twelfth state title, a record in both competitions.

== Honours ==
=== Official tournaments ===
National
Competitions	Titles	Seasons
Campeonato Brasileiro	4	2013, 2014, 2022, 2025
Inter-State
Competitions	Titles	Seasons
Superliga Centro-Sul	2	2014, 2015
Conferência Sul	6	2010, 2011, 2012, 2013, 2017, 2025
State
Competitions	Titles	Seasons
Campeonato Paranaense	13	2009, 2010, 2011, 2012, 2013, 2014, 2015, 2018, 2022, 2023, 2024, 2025, 2026

- record

=== Others tournaments ===
==== National ====
- Liga Brasileira – Divisão Azul (2): 2010, 2011

==== Inter-state ====
- Torneio Touchdown – Divisão Sul (1): 2009
- Copa Sul de Flag Football (1): 2023

==== State ====
- Campeonato Paranaense de Flag Football (2): 2024, 2025

=== Runners-up ===
- Campeonato Brasileiro (4): 2010, 2011, 2012, 2015
- Campeonato Paranaense (1): 2016

=== Youth team ===
- Campeonato Brasileiro Under-20 (1): 2022

=== Women ===
- Campeonato Paranaense de Flag Football (1): 2025
