= Juscelino Kubitschek de Oliveira Bridge =

Brazilian highway bridge over the Tocantins River

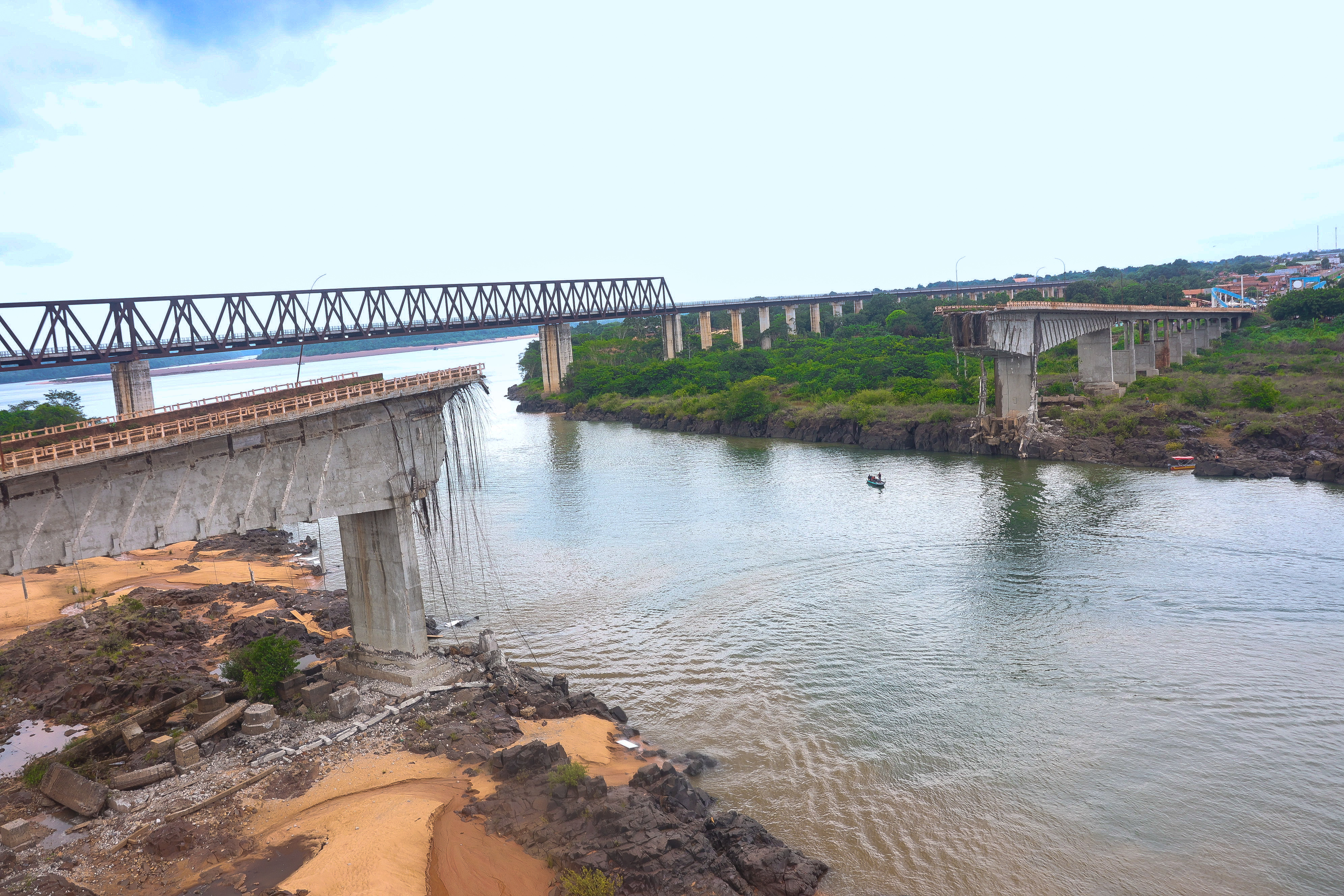
- Aftermath of the bridge collapse
- Date: 22 December 2024
- Time: c. 2:50 p.m. (UTC−3)
- Location: Between Estreito, Maranhão, and Aguiarnópolis, Tocantins, Brazil; 6°33′36.15″S 47°27′34.9″W
- Type: Structural failure (bridge)
- Deaths: 13
- Missing: 4

On 22 December 2024, the central portion of the Juscelino Kubitschek de Oliveira Bridge crossing the Tocantins River as part of the BR-226 and BR-010 highway and connecting the municipalities of Estreito, Maranhão, and Aguiarnópolis, Tocantins, Brazil, collapsed, killing at least 13 people and leaving at least four others missing.

== Background ==
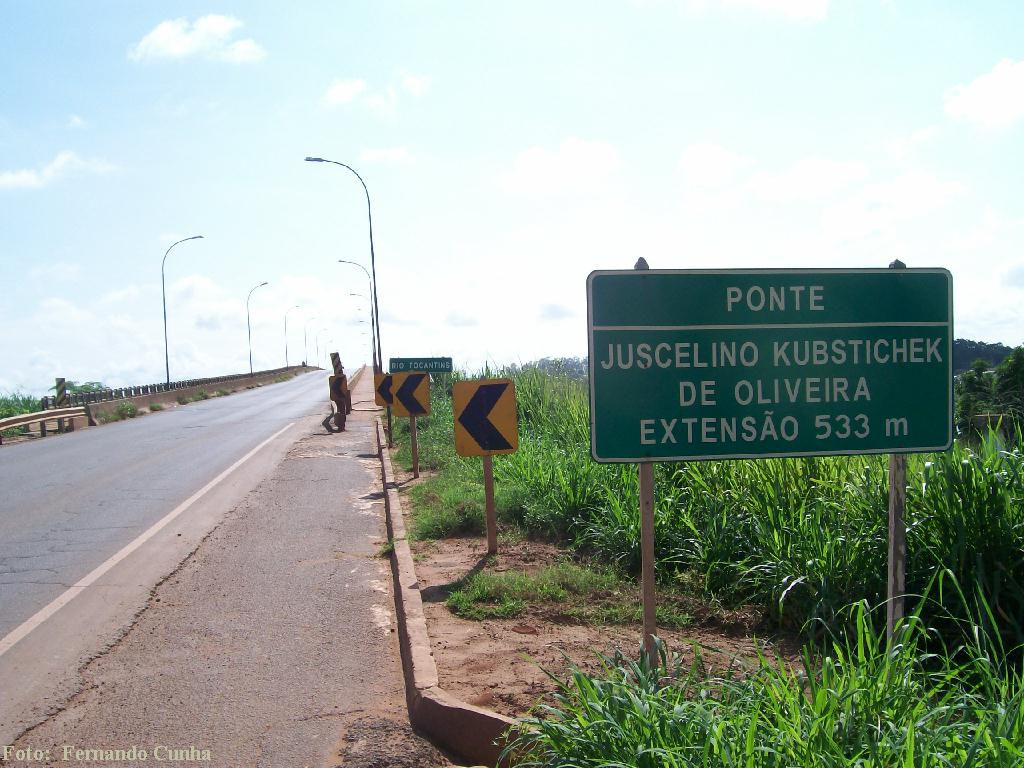
The bridge in 2008

The bridge, inaugurated in January 1961 and named after the Brazilian president at that time, Juscelino Kubitschek, was 533 metres (1,749 ft) long and had a free span of 140 metres (460 ft), a record at the time. It integrated the Belém–Brasília Highway, an important route for cargo transport within the country. In 2020, the National Department of Transport Infrastructure (DNIT), a federal government agency, had already reported several problems, such as cracks and inclinations in the pillars. In May 2024, the agency itself opened a process to hire companies and reform the bridge, which ended up not going ahead. A video, filmed by a local councillor who went to the bridge to record the extant structural issues, captured the beginning of the collapse.

== Collapse ==
At around 2:50 p.m. local time, the bridge collapsed. Ten vehicles fell into the river. In addition to the fatalities, a truck transporting about 76 tonnes (84 short tons) of sulfuric acid and 22-25,000 litres (6,600 US gal) of pesticide also plunged into the water, causing concerns about the risk of contamination of the Tocantins River. The neighboring Estreito-Aguiarnópolis Railway Bridge was not affected by the failure.

== Aftermath ==
=== Water supply ===
Owing to concerns of contamination by toxic chemicals, the governments of Tocantins and Maranhão recommended water providers to cut off the services of cities and towns supplied by the river. Only a few cities followed suit, including Imperatriz, due to others being endowed by groundwater. The government of the affected states also warned against contact with the river.

According to Caco Graça, a supervisor at Maranhão's environment secretariat, the risk of contamination had been minimized, following the discovery of the intact load which contained toxic substances. Water supply to Imperatriz resumed shortly after.

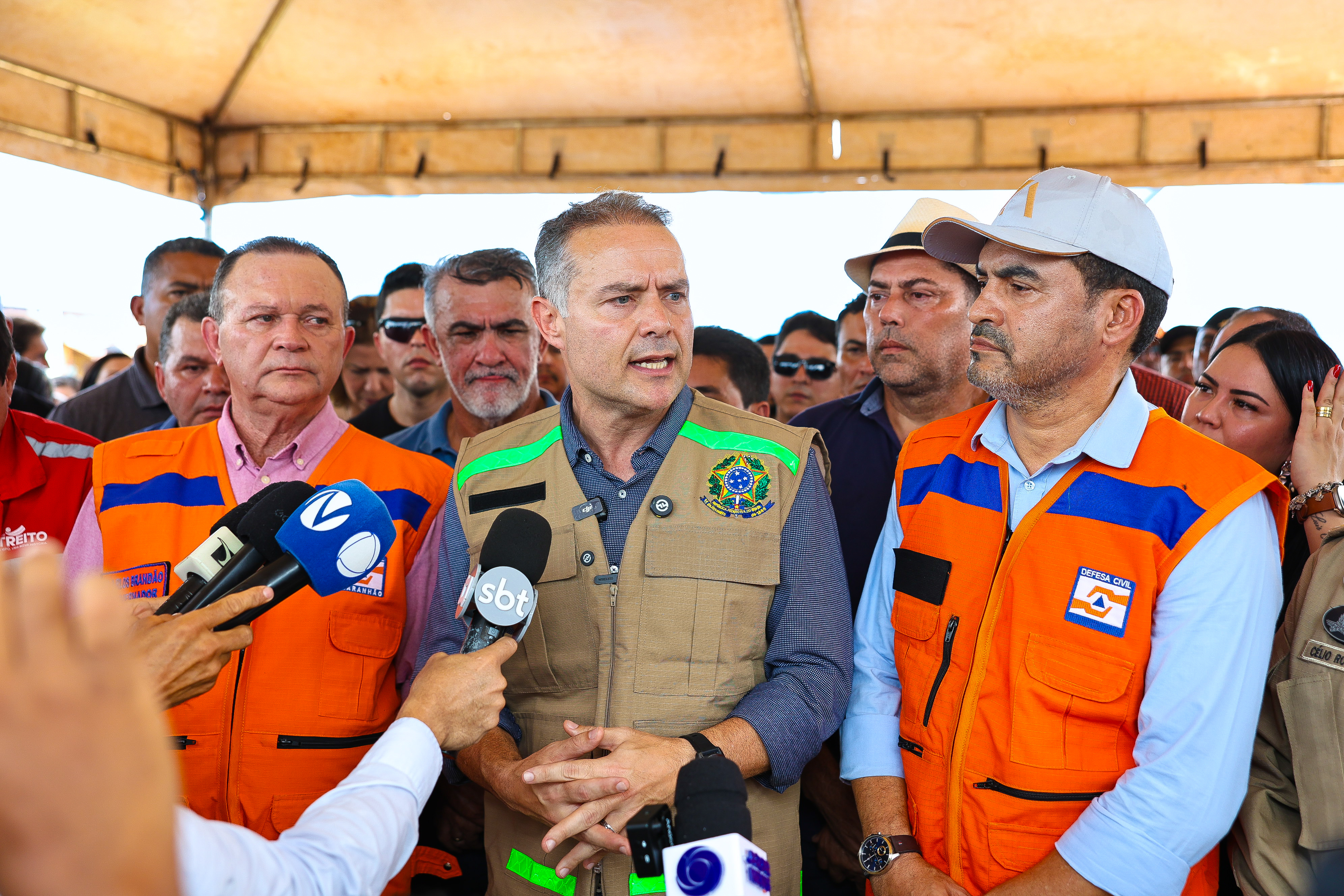
Minister of Transport, governors of Maranhão and Tocantins, Renan Filho, Carlos Brandão and Wanderlei Barbosa, during a press conference about the bridge collapse

=== Reactions ===
Brazilian president Luiz Inácio Lula da Silva expressed condolences to the victims' families and stated on his social media: "I follow with great attention the unfoldings of the collapse of the Juscelino Kubitschek de Oliveira Bridge, between the states of Tocantins and Maranhão."

He also said he sent the minister of transport Renan Filho to monitor and provide support in the situation. The minister, together with the governor of Tocantins Wanderlei Barbosa, announced the investment of more than R$100 million ($18,552,876 USD) for the immediate reconstruction of the bridge.

The governor of Maranhão Carlos Brandão assured the public that there is no risk of contamination of the river waters.

=== Victim recovery efforts ===
By 3 January 2025, 13 bodies were found by Brazilian authorities after submerged searches and at least four people were reported to be missing.
