= Cumaca Cave =

Cave system in Trinidad

Cumaca Cave is a large cave system located in northern Trinidad, in the southeastern area of the Northern Range. This cave is sometimes also called Oropouche. The caves are home to bats and Oilbirds (Steatornis caripensis). These are the only nocturnal fruit eating birds in the world. They forage at night, navigating by echolocation in the same way as bats, but with a high-pitched clicking sound audible to humans.

The cave is also home to hypogean fishes. Most notably the semi-blind catfish, Rhamdia quelen or South American Catfish, which was at first believed to be a distinct cave species and was named Caecorhamdia urichi. But it is now known as a troglobite form of Rhamdia quelen, with reduced eye size and reduced pigmentation.
