= Samuel Pinheiro Guimarães =

Brazilian professor, diplomat and economist

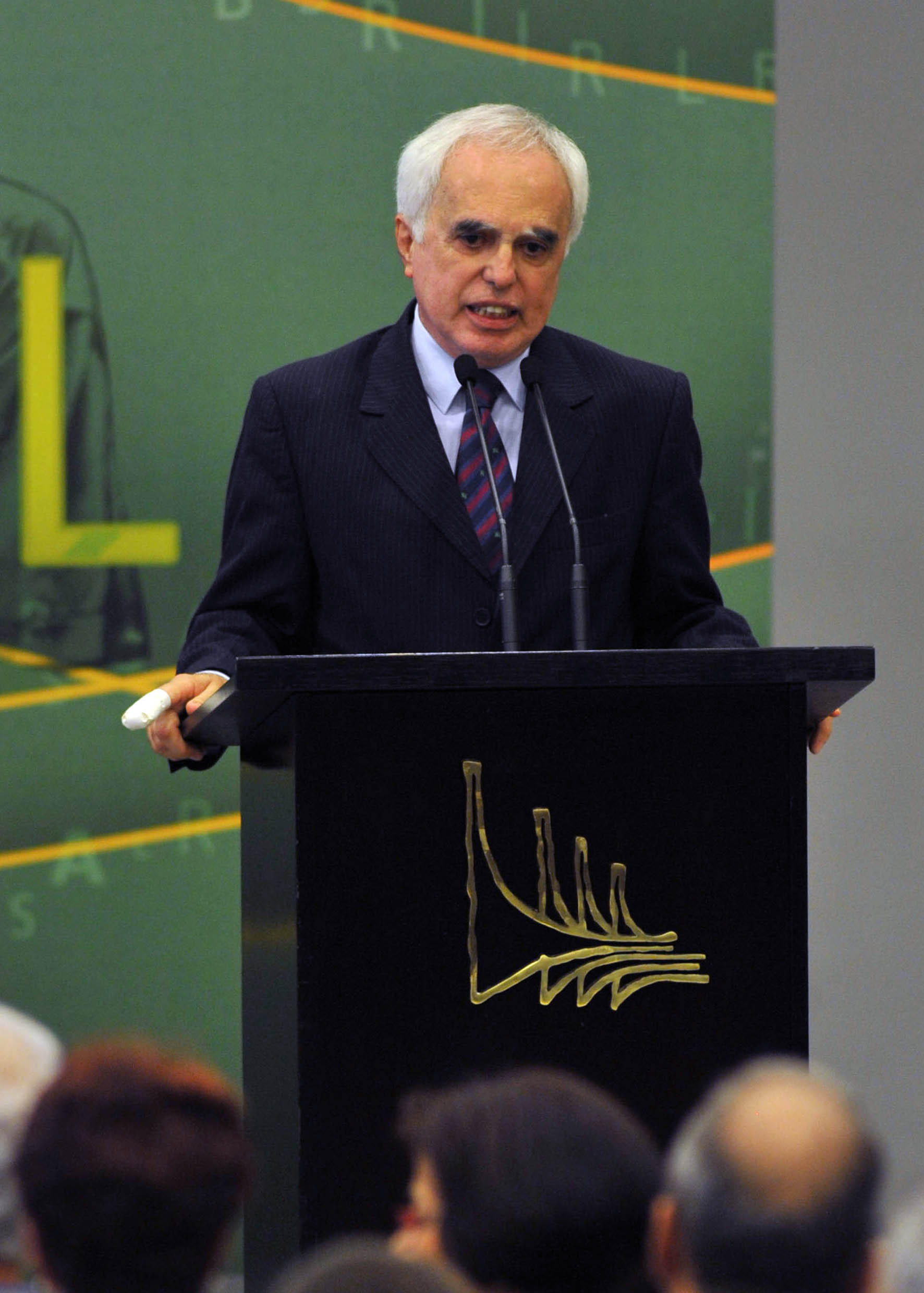
Pinheiro Guimarães in 2009

Samuel Pinheiro Guimarães (30 October 1939 – 29 January 2024) was a Brazilian professor, diplomat and economist.

Pinheiro Guimarães served as the Secretary General of Foreign Affairs (2003–2009). He died on 29 January 2024, at the age of 84.
