= Secretary General of Foreign Affairs (Brazil) =

Senior diplomatic office in Brazil

Secretary General of Foreign Affairs (in Portuguese: Secretário-Geral das Relações Exteriores, more commonly known as Secretary General of Itamaraty) is the highest position in Brazil's professional diplomatic career. The position must be occupied by a born Brazilian, admitted to the diplomatic career by public exams, and he or she must be a career ambassador (and not a political appointee). It is generally considered "the most graduated Brazilian diplomat" The Secretary General manages the Itamaraty, Brazil's Ministry of Foreign Affairs. He or she acts under the guidances of the Minister of Foreign Affairs (who can be a political appointee). As vice-chancellor of Brazil, the Secretary General is the Acting Foreign Minister inside Brazilian borders during all the trips abroad performed by the official, political Minister.

The current Secretary General of Foreign Affairs is Ambassador Maria Laura da Rocha, the first woman to hold the position.

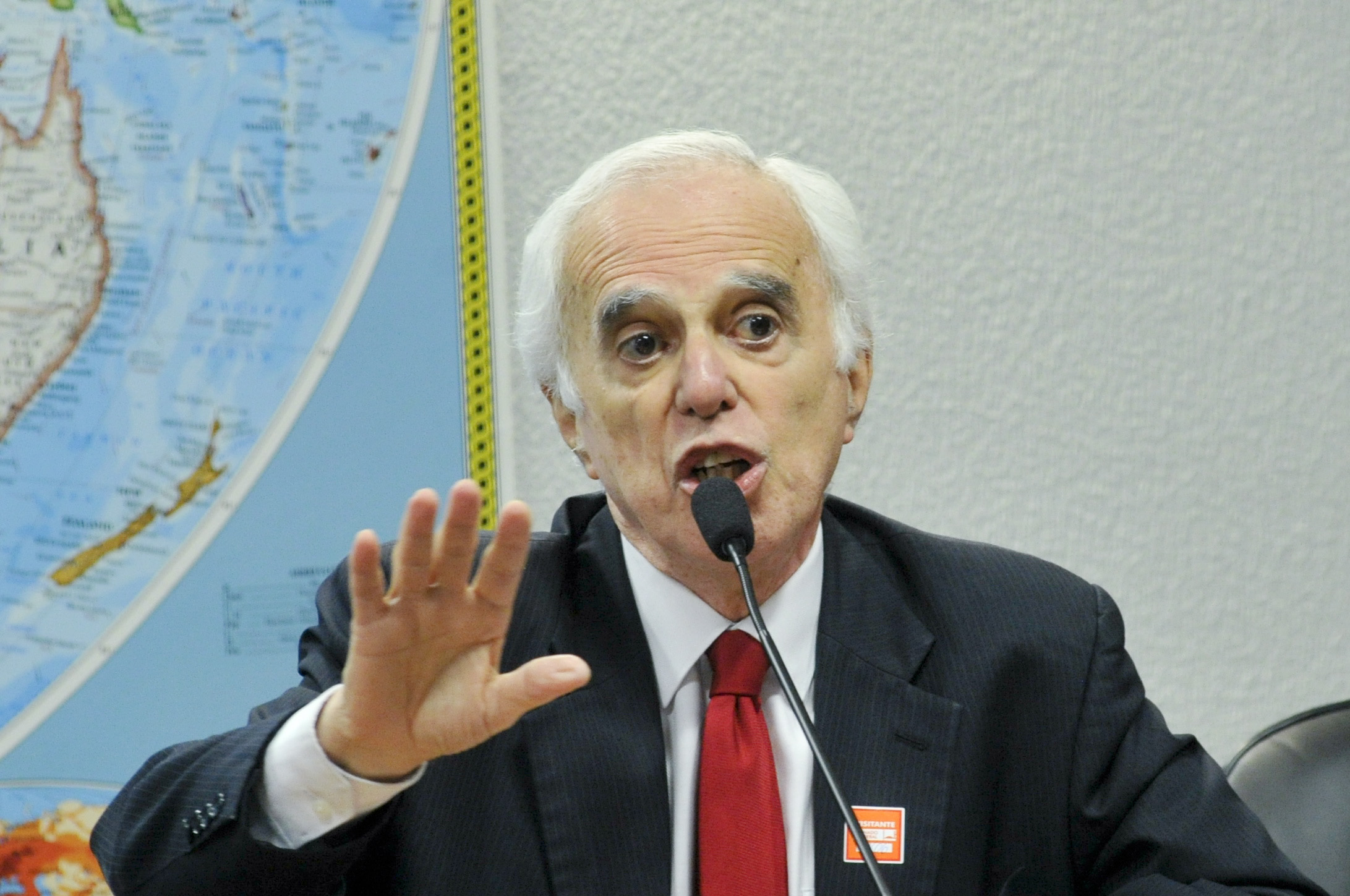
Samuel Pinheiro Guimarães, Secretary General of Foreign Affairs between 2003 and 2009

== List of former secretaries general ==
- 04/01/2023 – Maria Laura da Rocha
- 04/06/2021 – 04/01/2023 Fernando Simas Magalhães
- 03/01/2019 – 04/06/2021 Otávio Brandelli
- 25/05/2016 – 31/12/2018 Marcos Bezerra Abbott Galvão
- 16/01/2015 – 25/05/2016 Sérgio França Danese
- 27/02/2013 – 18/01/2015 Eduardo dos Santos
- 04/01/2011 – 26/02/2013 Ruy Nunes Pinto Nogueira
- 21/10/2009 – 31/12/2010 Antonio de Aguiar Patriota
- 07/01/2003 – 20/10/2009 Samuel Pinheiro Guimarães Neto
- 29/11/2001 – 02/01/2003 Osmar Vladimir Chohfi
- 04/01/1999 – 29/11/2001 Luiz Felipe de Seixas Corrêa
- 02/01/1995 – 04/01/1999 Sebastião do Rêgo Barros Netto
- 01/09/1993 – 02/01/1995 Roberto Pinto Ferreira Mameri Abdenur
- 23/06/1993 – 01/09/1993 Celso Luiz Nunes Amorim
- 08/10/1992 – 23/06/1993 Luiz Felipe Palmeira Lampreia
- 23/04/1992 – 08/10/1992 Luiz Felipe de Seixas Corrêa
- 15/03/1990 – 23/04/1992 Marcos Castrioto de Azambuja
- 15/03/1985 – 15/03/1990 Paulo Tarso Flecha de Lima
- 07/06/1984 – 15/03/1985 Carlos Calero Rodrigues
- 15/03/1979 – 07/06/1984 João Clemente Baena Soares
- 14/04/1978 – 15/03/1979 Dário Moreira de Castro Alves
- 15/03/1974 – 14/04/1978 Ramiro Elysio Saraiva Guerreio
- 09/12/1969 – 15/03/1974 Jorge de Carvalho e Silva
- 06/02/1969 – 03/12/1969 Mozart Gurgel Valente Junior
- 29/03/1968 – 31/01/1969 Mário Gibson Alves Barboza
- 16/03/1967 – 28/03/1968 Sérgio Corrêa Affonso da Costa
- 24/01/1966 – 16/03/1967 Manoel Pio Corrêa Junior
- 23/04/1964 – 24/01/1966 Antônio Borges Leal Castello Branco Filho
- 11/09/1963 – 23/04/1964 Aguinaldo Boulitreau Fragoso
- 12/07/1963 – 02/09/1963 João Augusto de Araujo Castro
- 17/05/1963 – 12/07/1963 Henrique Rodrigues Valle
- 13/10/1961 – 30/07/1962 Carlos Alfredo Bernardes
- 03/02/1961 – 31/05/1961 Vasco Tristão Leitão da Cunha
- 25/10/1960 – 03/02/1961 Edmundo Penna Barbosa da Silva
- 11/08/1959 – 25/10/1960 Fernando Ramos de Alencar
- 05/07/1958 – 06/08/1959 Antônio Mendes Vianna
- 30/11/1956 – 05/07/1958 Décio Honorato de Moura
- 29/09/1954 – 19/04/1956 Antônio Camillo de Oliveira
- 23/01/1954 – 29/09/1954 Vasco Tristão Leitão da Cunha
- 26/03/1951 – 04/01/1954 Mário de Pimentel Brandão
- 18/02/1949 – 01/02/1951 Cyro de Freitas Valle
- 13/12/1946 – 18/02/1949 Hildebrando Pompeu Pinto Accioly
- 01/02/1946 – 13/12/1946 Samuel de Souza Leão Gracie
- 05/06/1942 – 06/10/1944 Pedro Leão Velloso Netto
- 23/09/1939 – 05/06/1942 Maurício Nabuco
- 07/01/1939 – 21/06/1939 Cyro de Freitas Valle
- 31/01/1939 – 27/03/1939 Paulo Coelho de Almeida (acting)
- 03/09/1937 – 04/01/1939 Hildebrando Pompeu Pinto Accioly
- 06/11/1934 – 03/09/1937 Manuel de Pimentel Brandão
- 31/07/1934 – 06/11/1934 José Joaquim de Lima e Silva Moniz de Aragão (acting)
- 12/02/1934 – 31/07/1934 Maurício Nabuco (acting)
- 20/05/1931 – 26/07/1934 Felix de Barros Cavalcanti de Lacerda

== List of former under secretaries of state ==
- 28/07/1919 – 28/02/1921 Rodrigo Octávio Langaard Menezes
- 18/02/1919 – 28/07/1919 Augusto Cochrane de Alencar
- 12/01/1918 – 24/04/1918 Raul Régis de Oliveira
- 14/06/1916 – 07/05/1917 Luís Martins de Souza Dantas
- 20/08/1915 – 14/05/1916 Gastão da Cunha

== List of former directors general ==
- 10/05/1910 – 20/08/1915 Frederico Afonso de Carvalho
- 21/03/1865 – 15/01/1907 Joaquim Thomaz do Amaral
- 19/02/1859 – 21/03/1865 Joaquim Maria Nascente de Azambuja

== List of former major officers ==
- 13/04/1849 – 19/02/1859 Joaquim Maria Nascente de Azambuja
- 13/12/1827 – 13/04/1849 Bento da Silva Lisboa
- 22/02/1824 – 27/11/1827 Luiz Moutinho de Lima Alvares e Silva
- 02/05/1821 – 22/02/1824 Simeão Estellita Gomes da Fonseca
