= Oropouche virus =

Virus classification
- (unranked): Virus
- Realm: Riboviria
- Kingdom: Orthornavirae
- Phylum: Negarnaviricota
- Class: Bunyaviricetes
- Order: Elliovirales
- Family: Peribunyaviridae
- Genus: Orthobunyavirus
- Species: Orthobunyavirus oropoucheense

Synonyms
- Oropouche orthobunyavirus

Species of virus

Oropouche virus (OROV) is one of the most common orthobunyaviruses. When OROV infects humans, it causes a febrile illness called Oropouche fever. OROV was originally reported in Trinidad and Tobago in 1955 from the blood sample of a fever patient and from a pool of Coquillettidia venezuelensis mosquitoes. In 1960, OROV was isolated from a sloth (Bradypus tridactylus) and a pool of Ochlerotatus serratus mosquitoes in Brazil. The virus is considered a public health threat in tropical and subtropical areas of Central and South America, with over half a million infected people as of 2005. OROV is considered to be an arbovirus because it is transmitted between animals and humans by arthropods. OROV is primarily transmitted by biting midges, specifically Culicoides paraensis, but transmission by both Aedes and Culex mosquitos has been reported.

== Epidemic sites ==
The virus causes Oropouche fever, an urban arboviral disease that has since resulted in >30 epidemics during 1960–2009. Between 1961 and 1980, OROV was reported in the northern state of Pará, Brazil, and from 1980 to 2004, OROV had spread to the Amazonas, Amapá, Acre, Rondônia, Tocantins, and Maranhão.

== Virology ==
OROV belongs to the Peribunyaviridae family of arboviruses. OROV is a single-stranded, negative sense RNA virus. There are no specific ultrastructural studies of the oropouche virus in human tissues that have been recorded to this date. It is likely that this virus shares similar morphological characteristics with other members of the Orthobunyavirus genus. Members of the Orthobunyavirus genus have a three part, single-stranded, negative sense RNA genome of small (S), medium (M) and large (L) RNA segments. These segments function to encode nucleocapsids, glycoproteins and the RNA polymerase in that sequential order. Through phylogenetic analysis of nucleocapsid genes in different oropouche virus strains, it has been revealed that there are three unique genotypes (I, II, III) which have been spreading through Central and South America.

=== Genomic reassortment ===
Reassortment is said to be one of the most important mechanisms in explaining the viral biodiversity in orthobunyaviruses. This occurs when two genetically related viruses infect the same cell at the same time forming a progeny virus and this virus holds various components of genetic L, M and S segments from the two parental viruses. In reassortment, the S and L segments are usually exchanged between species further, the S segment, that is coded by the nucleocapsid protein, and the L polymerase function together to create a replication of the viral genome. Hence, one segment will restrict the molecular evolution of another segment and this is said to be inherited as a pair. On the contrary, the M segment codes for viral glycoproteins and these could be more prone to mutations due to a higher selective pressure in their coding region because these proteins are major host range determinants.

=== Genotypes ===
As of 2011, based on the small segment (SRNA) genetic information, there were 4 major genotypes (I–IV) of OROV. Genotype I was isolated from strains in Acre, Amazonas, Maranhão, Tocantins, Pará, Trinidad, and Tobago. Genotype II was obtained during the spread in Amapá, Pará, Rondônia, and Peru. Genotype III was isolated from samples in Acre, Minas Gerais, Panama, and Rondônia. The final genotype IV was isolated from Amazonas.

== Transmission and dispersion ==
OROV is considered to be an arbovirus due to the method of transmission by the mosquitoes Aedes serratus and Culex quinquefasciatus among sloths, marsupials, primates, and birds.

A possible dispersal could be predicted for the four genotypes based on time-scaled analysis and epidemiologic data association. Genotype I possibly dispersed towards western Pará, Trinidad, and Tobago. Afterwards, genotype I progressed towards Amazonas, Acre, Maranhão, and Tocantins. Genotype II possibly emerged in Amapá, Pará, Rondônia, and Peru at the same time. Genotype III emerged in Rondônia, moved towards Panama, Acre, and Maranhão. From Maranhão, the genotype progressed towards Minas Gerais. Finally, genotype IV emerged from the city of Manaus and Amazonas.

== Experimentation and research ==
OROV has been used extensively in testing with HeLa cells to study how it induces apoptosis. It was found that OROV causes apoptosis by DNA fragmentation. In UV-inactivated OROV, virus-receptor binding was not enough and that viral uncoating and replication were needed to induce apoptosis.
