= 2024 Porto Alegre fire =

2024 Building fire in Porto Alegre, Brazil

- Date: April 26, 2024
- Location: Porto Alegre, Rio Grande do Sul, Brazil
- Type: Building fire
- Cause: Suspected to be started by a match or lighter
- Deaths: 10
- Injuries: 13

In the early hours of 26 April 2024, a fire occurred at a guesthouse in Porto Alegre, Brazil. The fire resulted in the deaths of ten people and an animal, and the injuries of at least eleven others.

== Incident ==
The guesthouse was located in a three-story building on Avenida Farrapos. According to residents, the inn was from the Garoa chain. The flames started around 2am, and firefighters were called around 2:20 am. The fire occurred near a gas station. The commander of the 1st Battalion of the Fire Department, Lúcio Junes da Silva, said that the rooms in the guesthouse were very close together, causing the fire to spread quickly and preventing many people from leaving. At around 3am, five Fire Department trucks helped put out the fire. The Mobile Emergency Care Service (Samu), the Military Brigade and the Public Transport and Circulation Company (EPTC) were also present, and traffic was completely blocked. By 4 am, the fire was under control, according to the Fire Department, which was now working in the aftermath (fighting small outbreaks). Approximately an hour later, however, more intense flames appeared again and the building was completely destroyed.

According to RecordTV, two people died from smoke inhalation, while eight were burned to death. Two victims were on the first floor, five on the second and three on the third. Eleven people were rescued; eight were sent to hospitals by firefighters and EMS. Others received care at Hospital Cristo Redentor. Six injured people were taken to the Porto Alegre Emergency Hospital. The Municipal Health Department (SMS) reported that two people were intubated and in serious health. Another, also serious, had 20% of her body burned, and another had a fractured leg. The Fire Department reported that there were no missing people.

Captain Barbara Oliveira said that some people jumped from the balcony to escape the flames; in an interview, a witness said that a resident jumped from the third floor.

== Investigation ==
The site did not have a permit or a Fire Prevention and Protection Plan (PPCI) and, therefore, operated irregularly. The cause of the fire is unknown, and will be investigated by the firefighters and the Civil Police. Colonel Evaldo de Oliveira Junior, who is the municipal coordinator of Civil Protection and Defense of Porto Alegre, said that the hypothesis of an arson was being preliminarily worked on, and that the criminal would have entered the place during the early hours of the morning. According to Metrópoles, "Those who participated in fighting the flames believe that a lighter or a match may have started the fire."

== Reactions ==
The mayor of Porto Alegre, Sebastião Melo, lamented what happened on social media, saying that he was investigating the causes "with deep sadness". Eduardo Leite, the governor of Rio Grande do Sul, said the fire "profoundly dismays us".
