= Marcelo Cecé =

Brazilian politician (1936–2024)

Marcelo Cecé (8 January 1936 – 28 January 2024) was a Brazilian politician. He served two terms as Mayor of Sete Lagoas (1985–1988) and (1997–2000).

Due to allegations of corruption, he was removed from office several times. In July 2008, the Minas Gerais Court of Justice suspended Cecé's political rights for eight years. According to a complaint filed by the Public Prosecutor's Office, the former mayor was involved in a drug diversion scheme in 2000.

Cecé died at Nossa Senhora das Graças Hospital in Sete Lagoas on 28 January 2024, at the age of 88.
