= Fernandópolis =

- Municipality
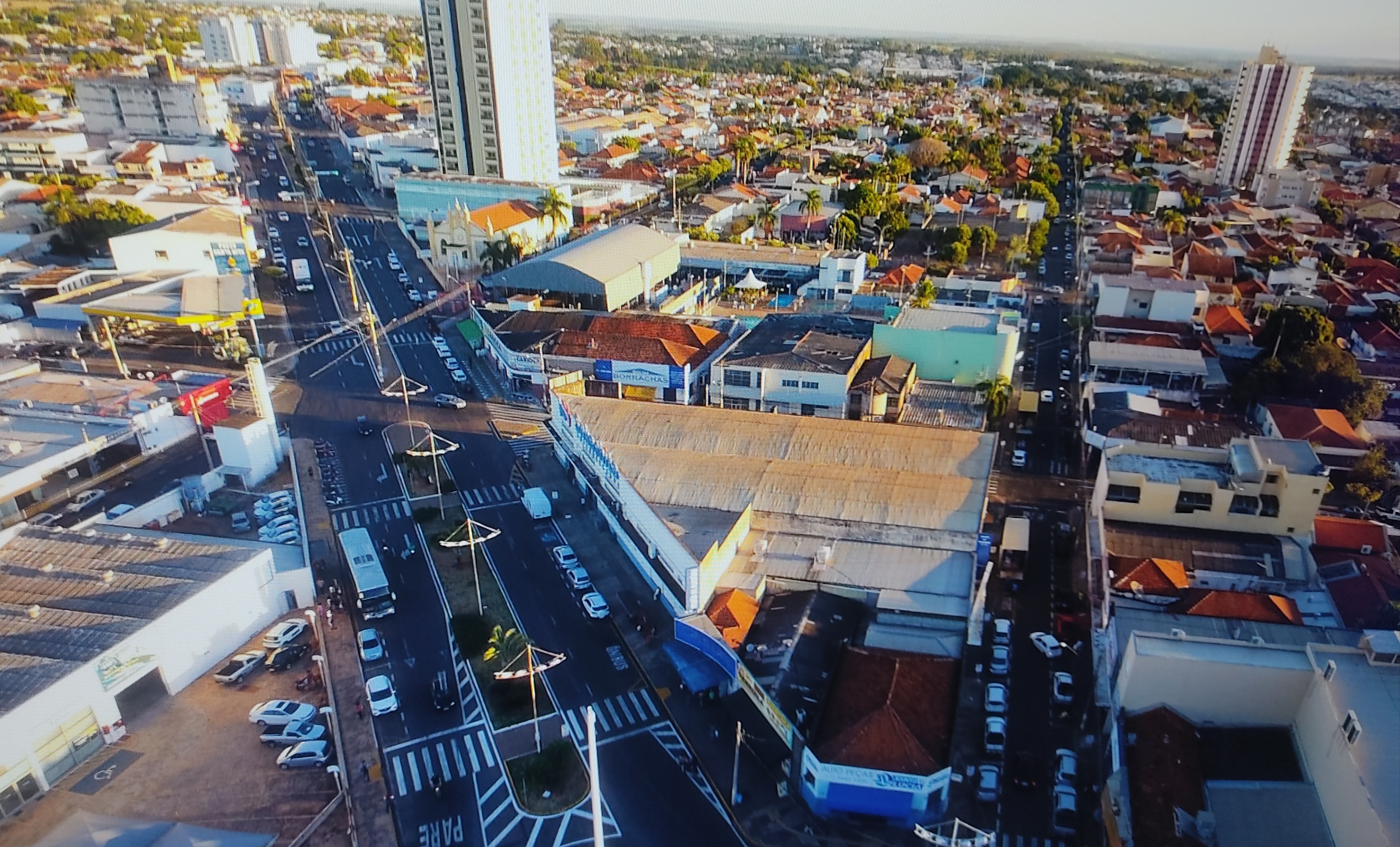

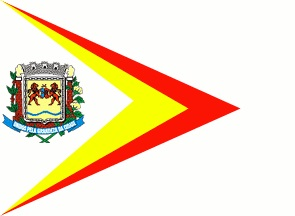
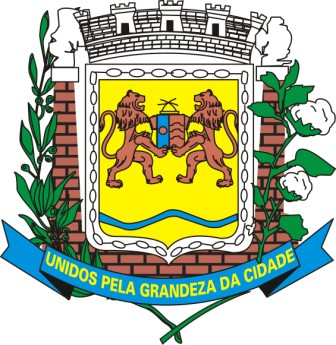
- Flag Coat of arms

- Location in São Paulo state

- Location in Brazil
- Coordinates: 20°17′02″S 50°14′45″W
- Country: Brazil
- Region: Southeast
- State: São Paulo
- Mesoregion: São José do Rio Preto
- Microregion: Fernandópolis

Government
  - Mayor: André Giovanni Pessuto

Area
  - Total: 550 km^{2} (210 sq mi)
- Elevation: 535 m (1,755 ft)

Population (2022)
  - Total: 71,186
  - Density: 130/km^{2} (340/sq mi)
- Time zone: UTC-03:00 (BRT)
  - Summer (DST): UTC-02:00 (BRST)
- Postal code: 15600-000
- Area code: +55 17
- Website: www.fernandopolis.sp.gov.br

Fernandópolis is a municipality in the state of São Paulo, Brazil. The population is 71,186 in an area of 550 km^{2}. Fernandópolis is the center of the microregion of Fernandópolis with 104,623 inhabitants and area of 2,811.7 km^{2}.

== History ==
The beginning of the city has relation with the cattle creation in the region and the opening of a "cow road" (Estrada Boiadeira) in the beginning of the 20th century. The coffee production in the region begins in 1917.

On November 30, 1944, the district was established and on January 1, 1945, the municipality of Fernandópolis was officially established with the emancipation from Tanabi.

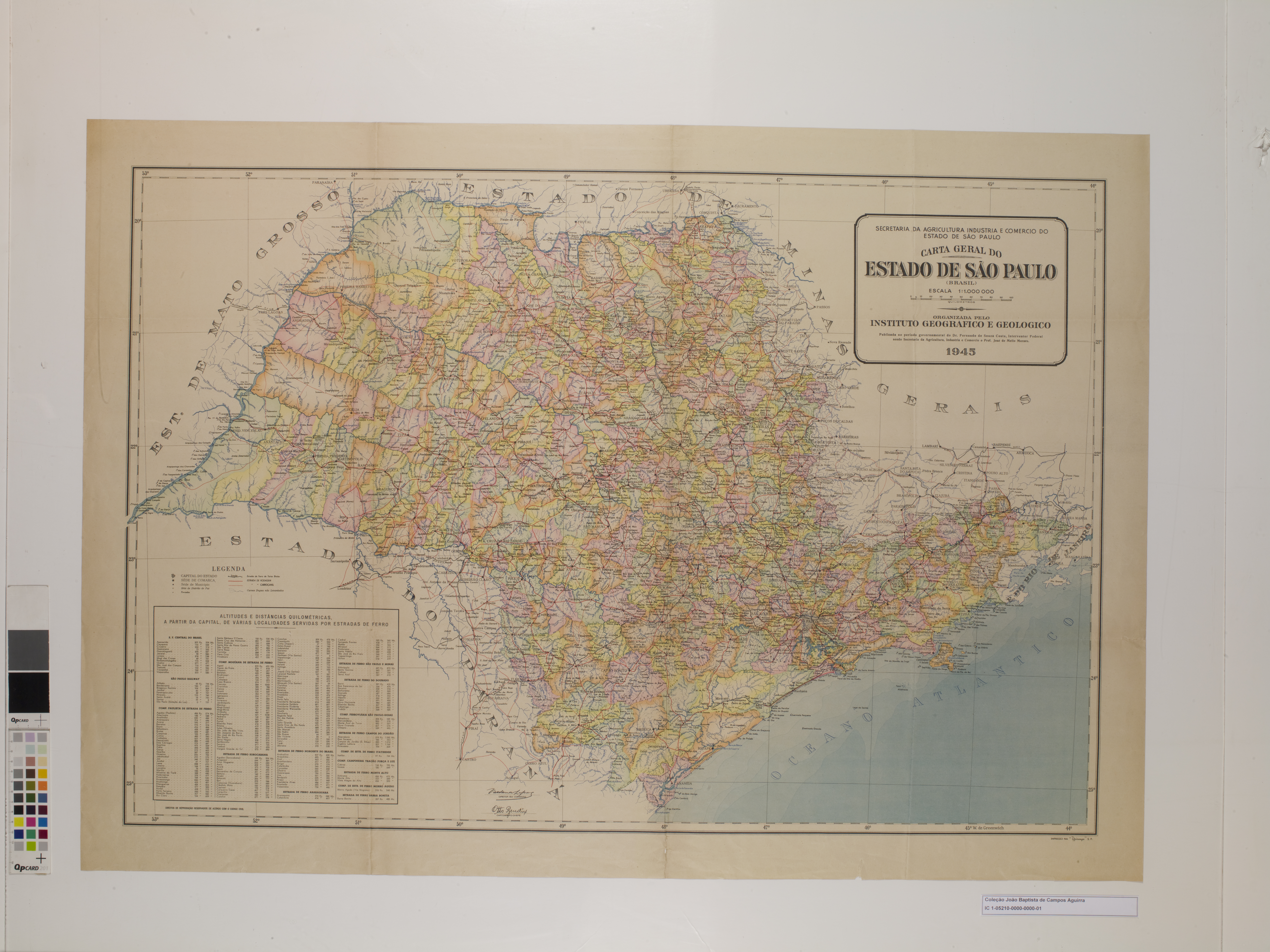
Map of the state of São Paulo (1944).

== Geography ==
Fernandópolis is located in the northwest of São Paulo state, 555 km from the city of São Paulo.

== Economy ==
The Tertiary sector is the economic basis of Fernandópolis. Commerce, services and public administration corresponds to 69.6% of the city GDP. Industry is 26.7% of the GDP, and the Primary sector corresponds to 3.6%.

== Culture ==
The city hosts an annual Expo, the Exposição de Fernandópolis, with Rodeo and other leisure options.

== Demographics ==
=== Indicators ===
- Population: 71,186 (IBGE/2022)
- Area: 550.0 km^{2} (212.4 sq mi)
- Population density: 126.97/km^{2} (328.9/sq mi)
- Urbanization: 96.9% (2010)
- Sex ratio (Males to Females): 94.77 (2011)
- Birth rate: 10.10/1,000 inhabitants (2009)
- Infant mortality: 7.69/1,000 births (2009)
- HDI: 0.832 (UNDP/2000)

All indicators are from SEADE and IBGE

== Media ==
In telecommunications, the city was served by Telecomunicações de São Paulo. In July 1998, this company was acquired by Telefónica, which adopted the Vivo brand in 2012. The company is currently an operator of cell phones, fixed lines, internet (fiber optics/4G) and television (satellite and cable).

== Sports ==
The city has a professional football team, the Fernandópolis Futebol Clube.

== Climate ==
Climate data for Fernandópolis, elevation 519 m (1,703 ft), (2010–2020 normals, extremes 2009–2022)
Month	Jan	Feb	Mar	Apr	May	Jun	Jul	Aug	Sep	Oct	Nov	Dec	Year
Record high °C (°F)	38.8 (101.8)	37.5 (99.5)	36.2 (97.2)	36.2 (97.2)	33.7 (92.7)	33.6 (92.5)	34.2 (93.6)	37.5 (99.5)	41.7 (107.1)	42.2 (108.0)	39.2 (102.6)	39.8 (103.6)	42.2 (108.0)
Mean daily maximum °C (°F)	31.9 (89.4)	32.1 (89.8)	31.5 (88.7)	31.0 (87.8)	28.7 (83.7)	28.1 (82.6)	28.7 (83.7)	30.4 (86.7)	33.0 (91.4)	33.0 (91.4)	31.8 (89.2)	32.2 (90.0)	31.0 (87.9)
Daily mean °C (°F)	26.5 (79.7)	26.6 (79.9)	26.0 (78.8)	25.1 (77.2)	22.5 (72.5)	22.0 (71.6)	22.0 (71.6)	23.2 (73.8)	25.8 (78.4)	26.5 (79.7)	26.0 (78.8)	26.6 (79.9)	24.9 (76.8)
Mean daily minimum °C (°F)	21.1 (70.0)	21.0 (69.8)	20.5 (68.9)	19.3 (66.7)	16.4 (61.5)	15.8 (60.4)	15.3 (59.5)	15.9 (60.6)	18.6 (65.5)	20.0 (68.0)	20.2 (68.4)	21.1 (70.0)	18.8 (65.8)
Record low °C (°F)	17.9 (64.2)	18.0 (64.4)	16.1 (61.0)	8.9 (48.0)	8.2 (46.8)	4.3 (39.7)	4.1 (39.4)	4.2 (39.6)	8.4 (47.1)	12.9 (55.2)	12.8 (55.0)	15.2 (59.4)	4.1 (39.4)
Average precipitation mm (inches)	219.0 (8.62)	167.3 (6.59)	178.9 (7.04)	59.5 (2.34)	51.2 (2.02)	35.1 (1.38)	20.2 (0.80)	16.0 (0.63)	57.9 (2.28)	104.1 (4.10)	133.6 (5.26)	165.5 (6.52)	1,208.3 (47.58)
Source: Centro Integrado de Informações Agrometeorológicas

== See also ==
- List of municipalities in São Paulo
- Interior of São Paulo
