= Culicoides paraensis =

Scientific classification
- Kingdom: Animalia
- Phylum: Arthropoda
- Clade: Pancrustacea
- Class: Insecta
- Order: Diptera
- Family: Ceratopogonidae
- Genus: Culicoides
- Species: C. paraensis

Binomial name
- Culicoides paraensis (Goeldi, 1905)

Species of fly

Culicoides paraensis is a species of midge found from the northern United States to Argentina, which acts as the vector of the Oropouche fever virus.

It develops in wet treeholes in North America, while in tropical regions, it uses cacao husks and banana stumps as larval habitats.
