= Aguiarnópolis =

Municipality in Tocantins, Brazil

- Municipality
- Location in Tocantins state

- Location in Brazil
- Coordinates: 6°33′46″S 47°27′57″W
- Country: Brazil
- Region: North
- State: Tocantins

Area
  - Total: 235 km^{2} (91 sq mi)

Population (2020)
  - Total: 6,892
  - Density: 29.3/km^{2} (76.0/sq mi)
- Time zone: UTC−3 (BRT)
- Website: https://www.aguiarnopolis.to.gov.br/ (Prefecture) https://aguiarnopolis.to.leg.br/ (Municipal council)

Aguiarnópolis is a municipality located in the Brazilian state of Tocantins. Its population was 6,892 (2020) and its area is 235 km^{2}.

== See also ==
- List of municipalities in Tocantins
- Juscelino Kubitschek de Oliveira Bridge collapse
