= Oropouche fever =

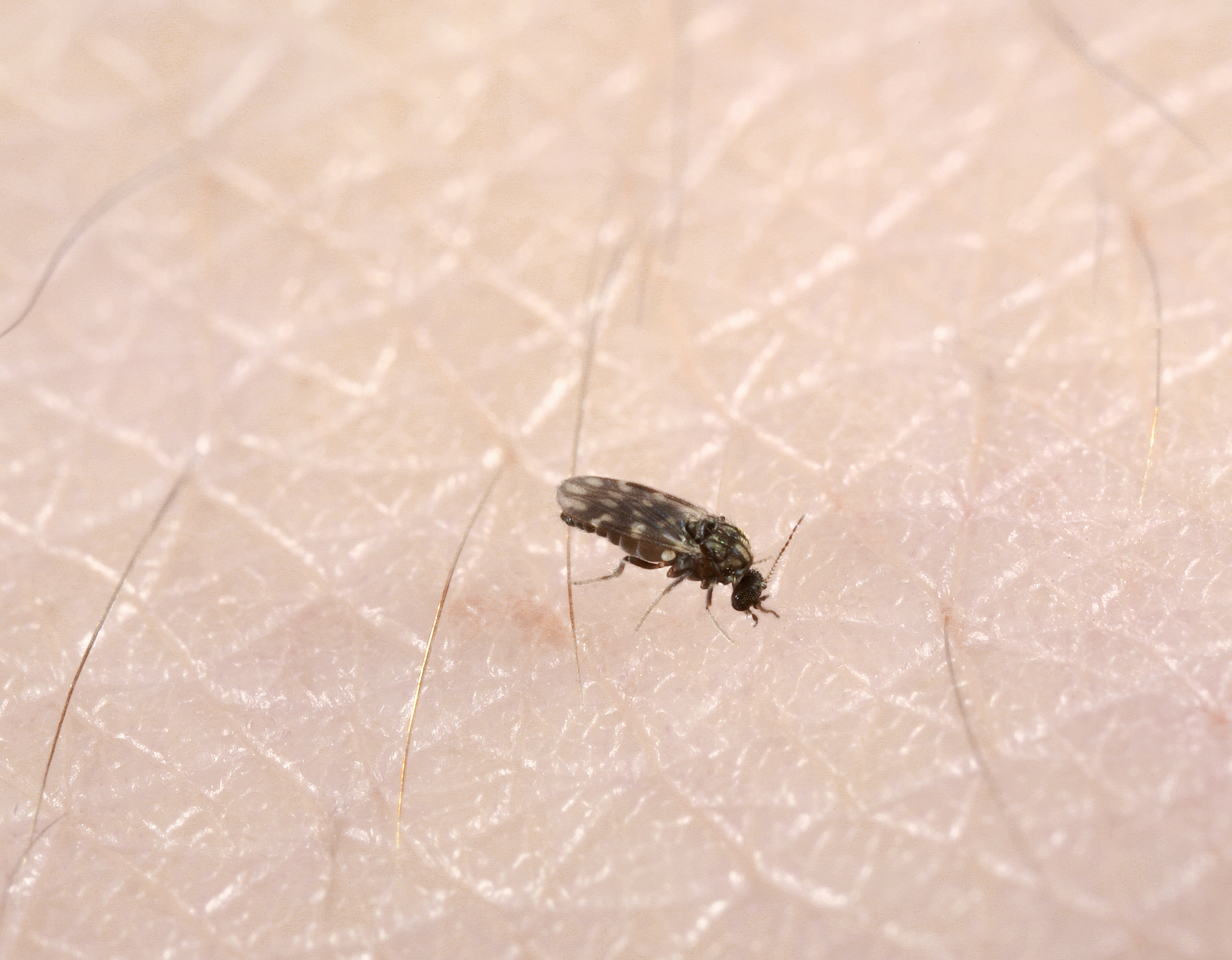
- Midges (Culicoides sp.) are the main vectors which spread the Oropouche virus between humans.
- Specialty: Infectious diseases
- Symptoms: Fever (~100%), headache (70–80%), arthralgia, myalgia, nausea, vomiting, dizziness, photophobia, rash
- Complications: Meningoencephalitis
- Usual onset: 3–8 days
- Duration: 2–7 days
- Causes: Oropouche virus (OROV)
- Diagnostic method: Clinical, laboratory (PCR)
- Differential diagnosis: Dengue, Chikungunya, Zika, yellow fever, malaria
- Treatment: Symptomatic; none specific

Oropouche fever is a tropical disease caused by infection with Oropouche virus. It is a zoonosis transmitted by biting midges and mosquitoes, from a natural reservoir which includes sloths, non-human primates, and birds. The disease is named after the region where it was first discovered and isolated in 1955, by the Oropouche River in Trinidad and Tobago.

Oropouche fever is endemic to the Amazon basin, with some evidence that its range may be spreading more widely in South and Central America. Since its discovery in 1955, there have been more than 30 epidemics of OROV in countries including Brazil, Peru, and Panama, with over half a million diagnosed cases in total. It has also been detected in-between epidemics, indicating that it may spread silently.

The signs and symptoms of Oropouche fever are similar to those of dengue, chikungunya, and Zika. Symptoms are often mild and typically begin three to eight days after infection. Fever, headache, and muscle and joint pains are most common; a skin rash, unusual sensitivity to light, and nausea and vomiting may also occur. Most cases are self-limited, with recovery in two to seven days. In severe illness, however, the central nervous system may be affected, with symptoms of meningitis and encephalitis, and a tendency to excessive bleeding has been reported in up to 15% of cases.

Oropouche fever has been recognized as among the most neglected of tropical diseases and as an emerging infectious disease. Little is known about its epidemiology, pathogenesis, and natural history, and there is no specific treatment or vaccine.

== Signs and symptoms ==
Oropouche fever is characterized as an acute febrile illness, meaning that it begins with a sudden onset of a fever followed by other clinical symptoms. It typically takes four to eight days (the incubation period) from the bite of the infected mosquito or midge to the first signs of infection.

Fever is the most common symptom, occurring in nearly all cases, with temperatures as high as 40 °C (104 °F). Other symptoms include chills, headache, muscle and joint pain (myalgia and arthralgia), dizziness, photophobia, nausea, vomiting, epigastric pain, and rashes. As in dengue, a skin rash resembling rubella, conjunctival injection, and pain behind the eyes may occur. The initial febrile episode typically resolves within seven days, but a reccurrence of symptoms with a lesser intensity is common, typically in about 60% of cases. Fatigue and weakness may also persist for up to a month after infection.

In serious cases, particularly in large outbreaks, the central nervous system (CNS) may be affected with symptoms of meningitis and encephalitis, including severe headache, dizziness, neck stiffness, double vision, darting of the eyes, uncoordinated movements, and evidence of viral infection in the cerebrospinal fluid (CSF). A tendency to abnormal bleeding has been reported in up to 15% of cases.

=== In pregnancy ===
in July 2024, the Brazilian Ministry of Health released a report of four cases of microcephaly in newborns of infected mothers. Fetal deaths were observed possibly associated with vertical transmission, i.e. from mother to child.

== Cause ==
The oropouche virus is an emerging infectious agent, which causes the illness oropouche fever. This virus is an arbovirus and is transmitted among sloths, marsupials, primates, and birds through mosquito species including Aedes serratus and Culex quinquefasciatus. The oropouche virus has evolved to an urban cycle infecting humans though a midge, Culicoides paraensis, as its main transporting vector, with mosquitoes such as Culex quinquefasciatus also possibly contributing.

OROV was first described in Trinidad in 1955 when the prototype strain was isolated from the blood of a febrile human and from Coquillettidia venezuelensis mosquitoes. In Brazil, OROV was first described in 1960 when it was isolated from a three-toed sloth (Bradypus tridactylus) and Ochlerotatus serratus mosquitoes captured nearby during the construction of the Belém–Brasília Highway.

== Epidemiology ==
Large epidemics are common and very swift, one of the earliest and largest having occurred in 1961 at the city of Belém, in the Brazilian Amazon state of Pará, with 11,000 recorded cases. In the Brazilian Amazon, oropouche is the second most frequent viral disease, after dengue fever. Several epidemics have generated more than 263,000 cases, of which half occurred in the period from 1978 to 1980. It is estimated that more than half a million cases have occurred since in Brazil alone, with most having gone undiagnosed or misdiagnosed due to limited availability of laboratory methods for diagnosis, the clinical similarity of Oropouche fever to other more prevalent arboviral illnesses, and the fact that in many cases there may be co-infection with other similar mosquito-borne viruses.

The oropouche virus is responsible for causing massive, explosive outbreaks in Latin American countries. Between December 2023–June 2024, large Oropouche virus disease outbreaks were recognized in areas with known endemic disease, and the virus emerged in new areas in South America and Cuba where it had not been historically reported. By August 2024, over 8,000 laboratory-confirmed cases were reported in Bolivia, Brazil, Colombia, Cuba, and Peru, large outbreaks that resulted in travel-associated cases, including 19 Oropouche virus disease cases in European travelers returning from Cuba (n = 18) and Brazil (one) during June–July 2024, and 21 cases in U.S. residents returning from travel to Cuba (20 in Florida, one in New York). While most cases were characterized by mild self-limited febrile illness, two deaths were reported, both in non-pregnant women who were otherwise healthy.

ORO fever occurs mainly during the rainy seasons, because there is an increase in breeding sites in the vector populations. There has also been reports of the oropouche epidemics during the dry season but this is most likely due to the high population density of mosquitoes from the past rainy season.

== Mechanism ==
Oropouche fever is caused by the oropouche virus (OROV).

=== Pathogenesis ===
There is not a significant amount of information regarding the natural pathogenesis of OROV infections. Within two to four days from the initial onset of systematic symptoms in humans, the virus is detected in the blood. In some cases the virus has also been recovered from the cerebrospinal fluid, but the route of invasion to the central nervous system (CNS) remains unclear. In one study of three patients with oropouche meningoencephalitis confirmed by reverse transcription-polymerase chain reaction, two of the patients had underlying conditions that can affect the CNS and immune system (one had HIV/AIDS) and the third had neurocysticercosis; the authors thus theorized that CNS invasion by OROV can be facilitated by preexisting damage to the blood-brain barrier.

==== Animal models ====
To further elucidate the pathogenesis of OROV, experiments using murine models have been performed.

BALB/c neonate mice were infected subcutaneously and presented clinical symptoms five days after inoculation. The mice revealed a high concentration of the replicating virus in the brain along with inflammation of the meninges and apoptosis of neurons without encephalitis, which is inflammation of the brain due to an infection. These findings confirmed the neurotropism of this virus, which means that this virus is capable of infecting nerve cells. Immunohistochemistry was used to reveal how this virus had access to the central nervous system. As the infection progresses, the virus crosses the blood-brain barrier and spreads to the brain parenchyma leading to severe manifestations of encephalitis. OROV infection starts from the posterior parts of the brain and progresses toward the forebrain.The oropouche virus spreads through the neural routes during early stages of the infection, reaching the spinal cord and traveling upward to the brain through brainstem with little inflammation.

== Diagnosis ==
Laboratory diagnosis of the oropouche infection is done through classic and molecular virology techniques. These include:

1. Virus isolation attempt in new born mice and cell culture (Vero Cells)
2. Serological assay methods, such as HI (hemagglutination inhibition), NT (neutralization test), and CF (complement fixation test) tests and in-house-enzyme linked immunosorbent assay for total immunoglobulin, IgM, and IgG detection using convalescent sera (obtained from recovered patients rich in anti- ORO antibodies)
3. Reverse transcription polymerase chain reaction (RT-PCR) and real time RT-PCR for genome detection in acute samples (sera, blood, and viscera of infected animals)

Clinical diagnosis of oropouche fever is challenging due to the nonspecific nature of the disease; in many cases, it can be confused with dengue fever or other arboviral illnesses.

== Prevention ==
Oropouche fever occurs in outbreaks, so the chance contracting it even after being exposed to areas with midges or mosquitoes is small. Prevention strategies include reducing the breeding of midges through source reduction by removal and modification of breeding sites and reducing contact between midges and people. This can be accomplished by reducing the number of natural and artificial water-filled habitats in which the midge larvae grow.

There is no vaccine.

== Treatment ==
There is no cure or specific therapy for Oropouche fever; only symptomatic treatment (such as analgesics for pain relief and fluids to prevent and treat dehydration) is recommended. Aspirin and other non-steroidal anti-inflammatory drugs are not recommended for treatment. Ribavirin is ineffective and is not recommended.

== Prognosis ==
The infection is usually self-limited and complications are rare. Illness usually lasts for about a week, although in extreme cases can be prolonged and aches and fatigue can persist for several weeks. Patients usually recover fully with no long-term ill-effects. There had been no recorded fatalities resulting from oropouche fever until 2024, when two deaths were confirmed in the Brazilian state of Bahia. As of 2025, there have been 7 more deaths in Brazil.

== See also ==
- 2023–2024 Oropouche virus disease outbreak
