= Estreito, Maranhão =

Estreito
- Municipality
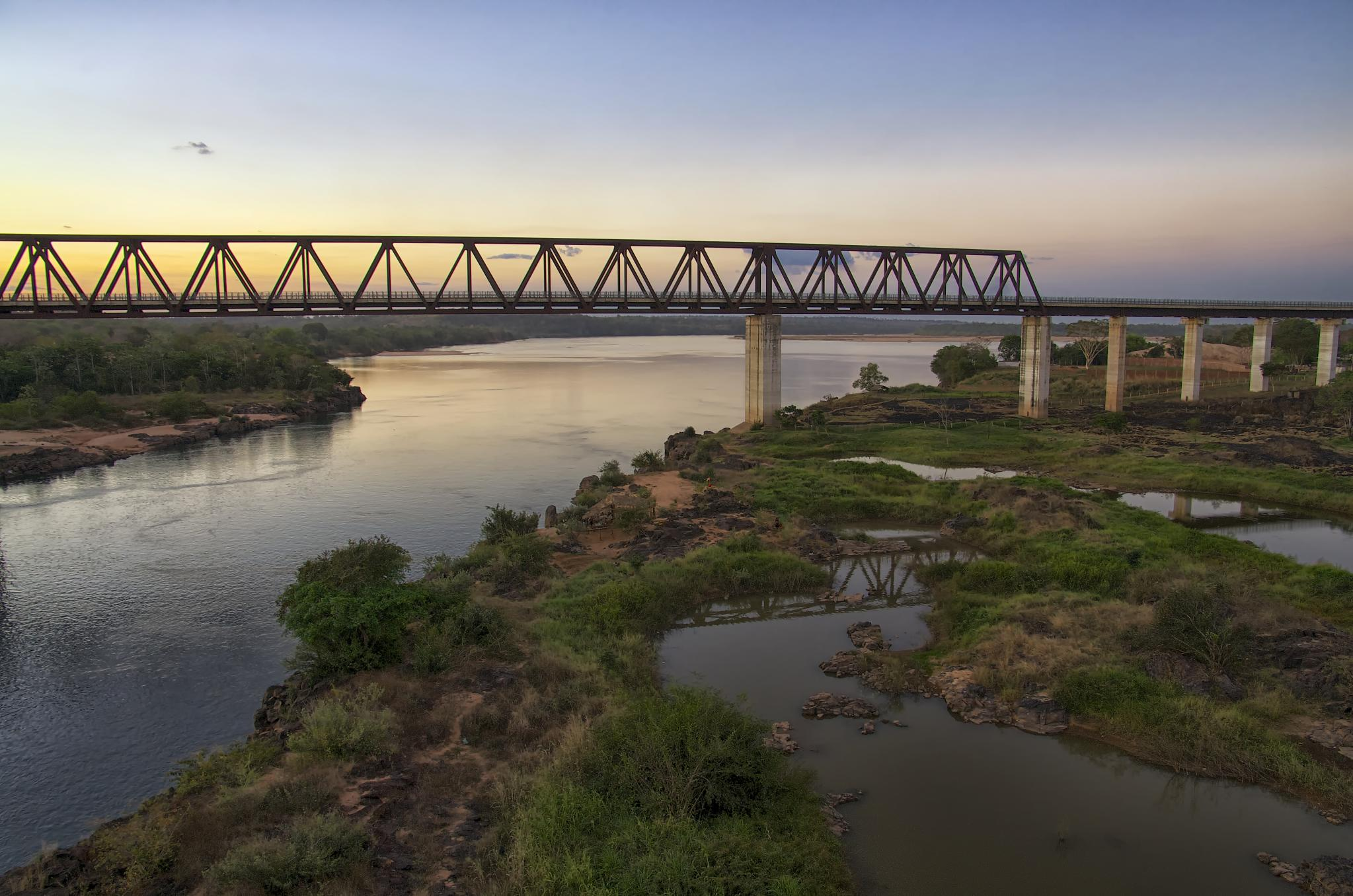

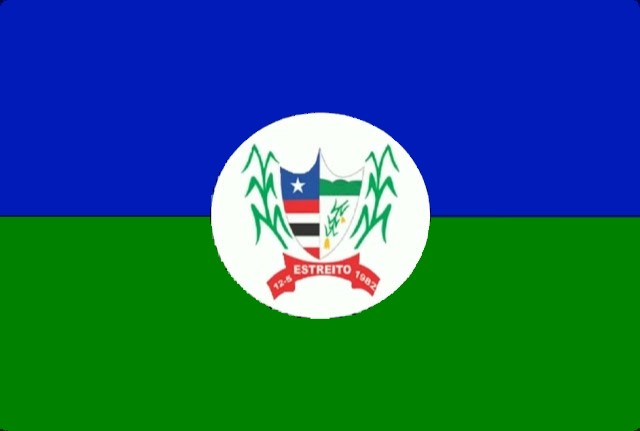
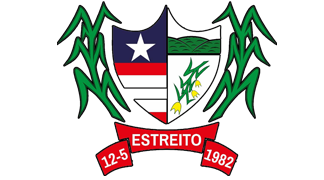
- Flag Coat of arms
- Interactive map of Estreito
- Coordinates: 6.56083°S 47.4508°W
- Country: Brazil
- Region: Nordeste
- State: Maranhão
- Mesoregion: Sul Maranhense

Population (2020)
  - Total: 42,527
- Time zone: UTC−3 (BRT)
- Website: https://estreito.ma.gov.br/ (Prefecture) https://www.cmestreito.ma.gov.br/ (Municipal council)

Estreito is a municipality in the state of Maranhão in the Northeast region of Brazil.

== See also ==
- List of municipalities in Maranhão
- Juscelino Kubitschek de Oliveira Bridge collapse
