= Dom Eliseu =

Dom Eliseu Dom Elizeu
- Municipality
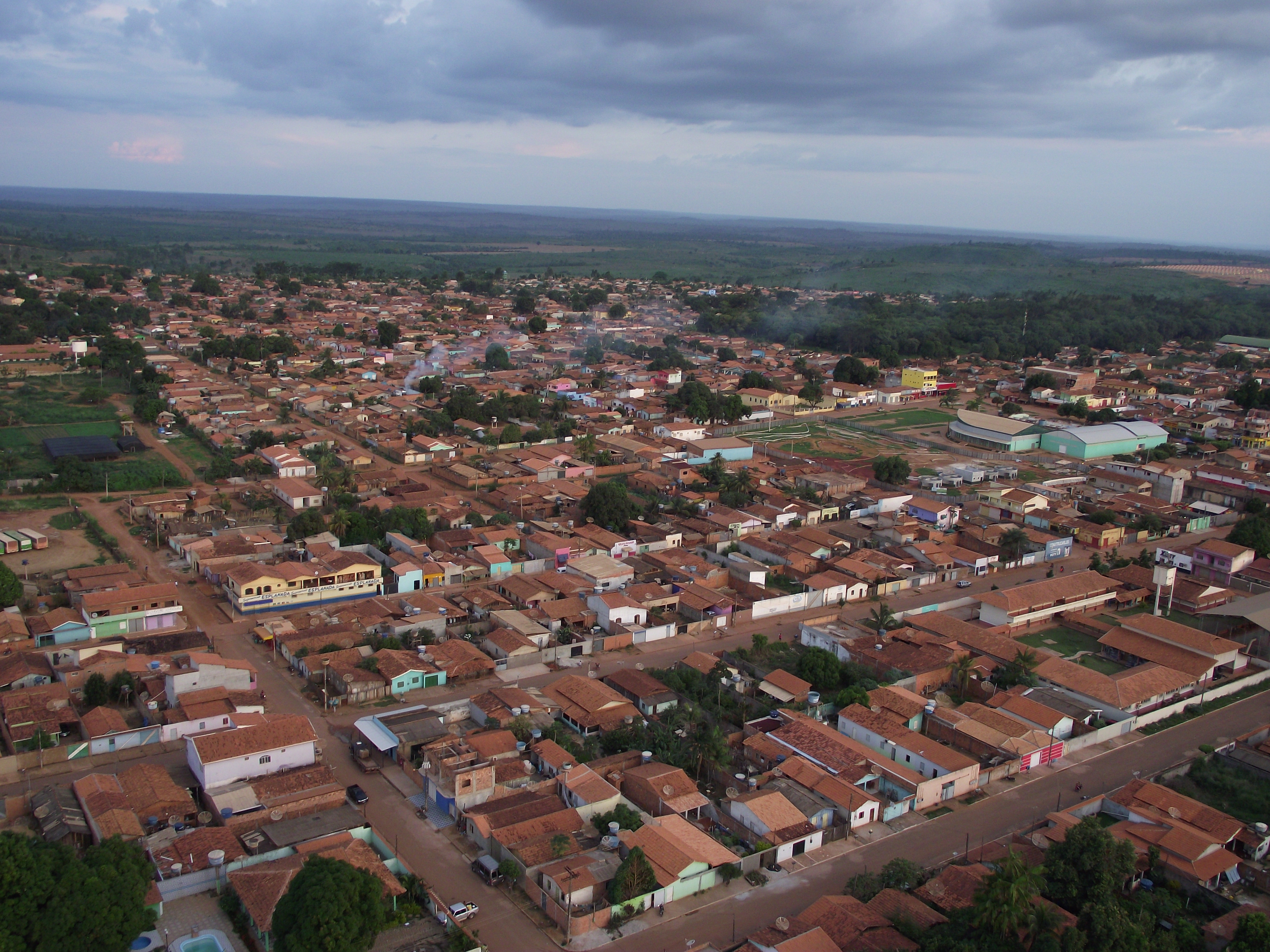
- View of Dom Eliseu

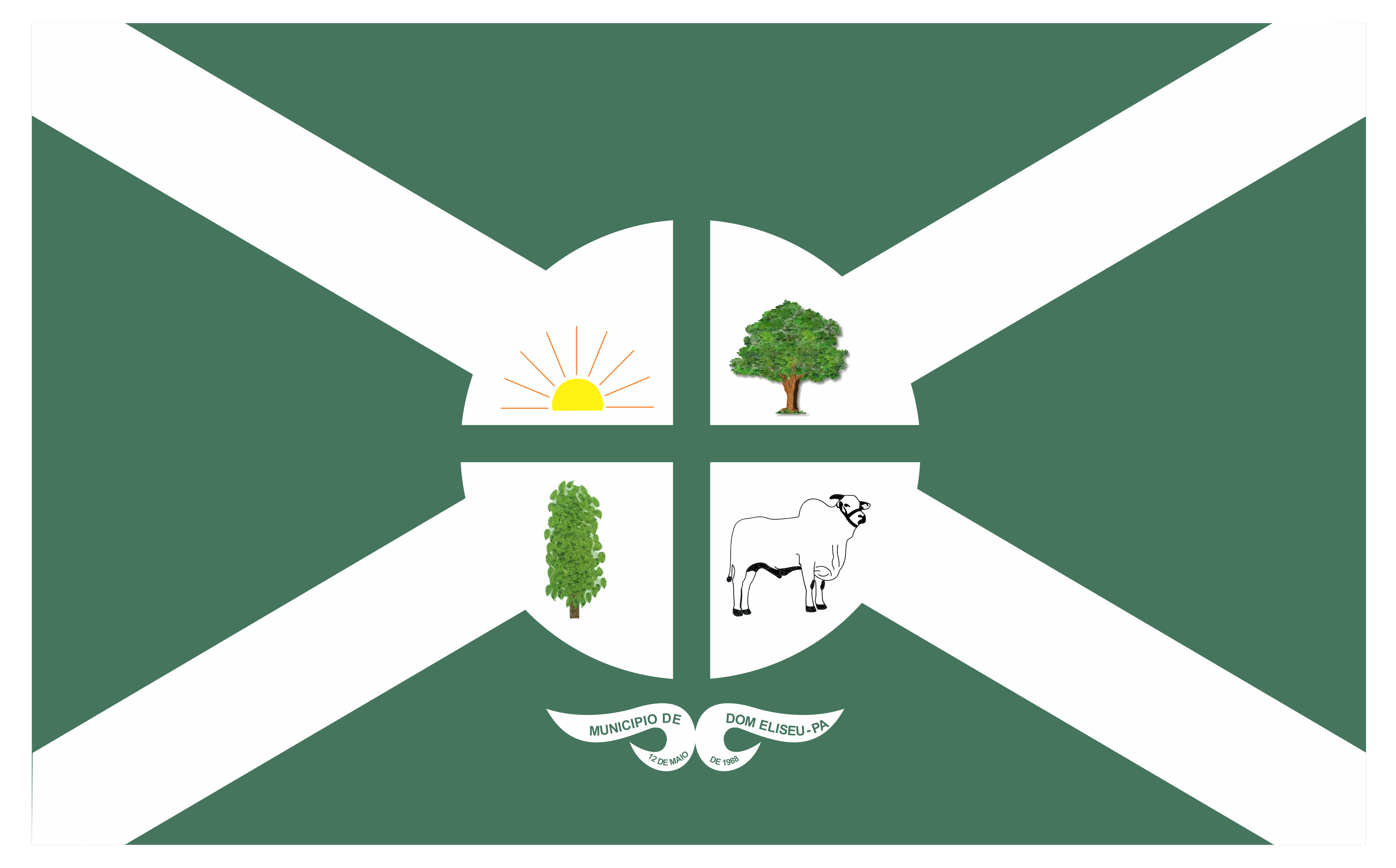
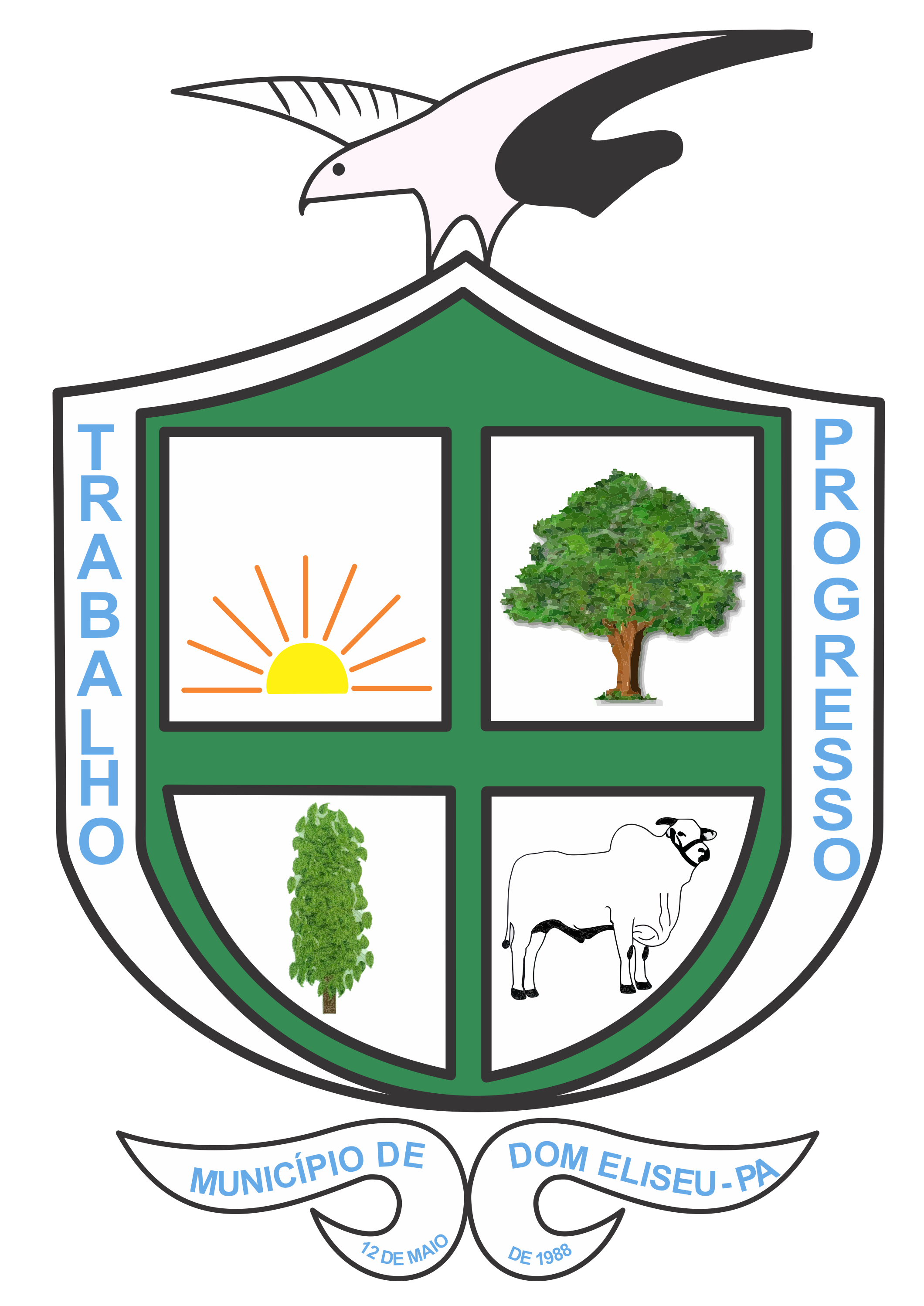
- Flag Coat of arms
- Motto(s): Trabalho, progresso (Work, progress)
- Location of Dom Eliseu from Pará

- Location in Brazil
- Coordinates: 4°14′06″S 47°30′18″W
- Country: Brazil
- Region: Northern
- State: Pará
- Mesoregion: Sudeste Paraense
- Microregion: Microregion of Paragominas
- Bordering municipalities: Ulianópolis, Paragominas, Rondon do Pará, Abel Figueiredo, Itinga do Maranhão and Açailândia
- Distance from Capital: 150km
- First settled: 1961
- Emancipation: May 1, 1988
- Founder: Leopoldo Cunha
- Named for: Dom Eliseu Corolli
- Towns: Dom Eliseu: Esplanada Ligação do Pará Itinga do Pará Cajuapara Bom Jesus São José Mercedes

Government
  - Body: Câmara Municipal de Dom Eliseu
  - Mayor: Gersilon da Silva Gama (União)

Area
  - Total: 2,033.799 sq mi (5,267.514 km^{2})
- Elevation: 590 ft (180 m)

Population (2022)
  - Total: 58,484
  - Estimate: 62,322
  - Rank: 2nd (Microregion of Paragominas)
  - Density: 29/sq mi (11.1/km^{2})
- Demonym: domeliseuense eliseuense
- Time zone: UTC−3 (BRT)
- Postal code: 68633-000
- HDI: 0.615
- GDP: 461,795.26 R$
- GDP per Capita: 8,318.69 R$
- Website: https://www.domeliseu.pa.gov.br

Dom Eliseu is a municipality in the state of Pará in the Northern region of Brazil. At an altitude of 180 meters, its estimated population in 2021 is around 61,206. Because of its status as a trading post and sales from wood, seeds, straw, guava and other factors, Dom Eliseu has a dynamic commercial and service sector. It is one of the busiest municipalities in the southeast region of Pará. It is the second populous municipality in the Microregion of Paragominas, behind only Paragominas (municipality). Its HDI is around 0.615, which is medium.

== History ==
The occupation of the territorial area of Dom Eliseu began in the 1960s. During this period, the first major integration highway of the region was opened, the BR-010, during the administration of the former Brazilian president Juscelino Kubitschek. Immediately after the inauguration of this highway, the governor of Pará, Alacid da Silva Nunes, determined the construction of an integration highway between the Northeast of Pará and the Southeast of Pará, PA-70 (present-day BR-222).

=== Early Growth of Dom Eliseu ===
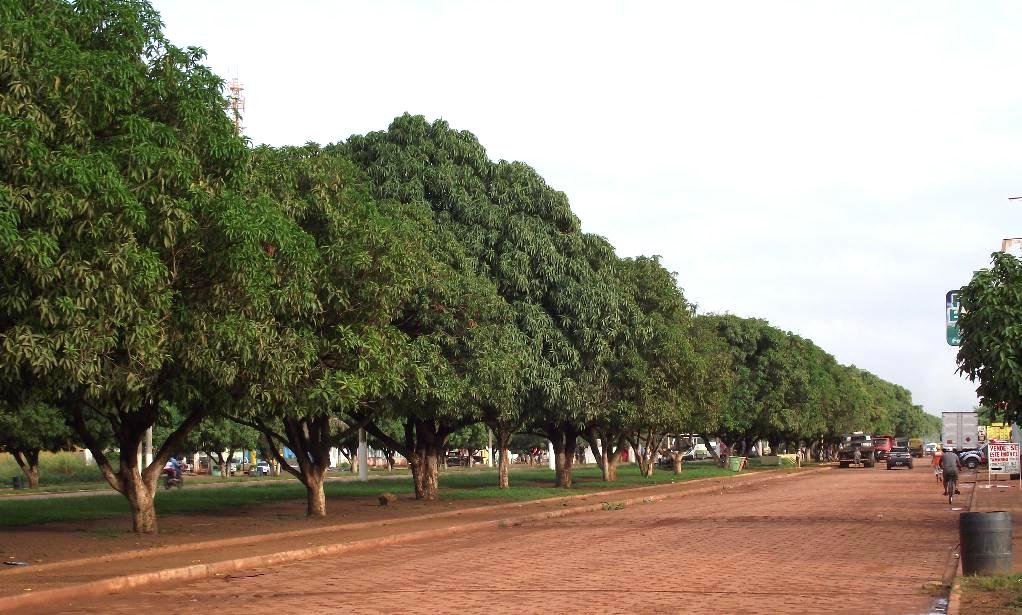
Line of trees in avenue parallel to BR-010 in Dom Eliseu.

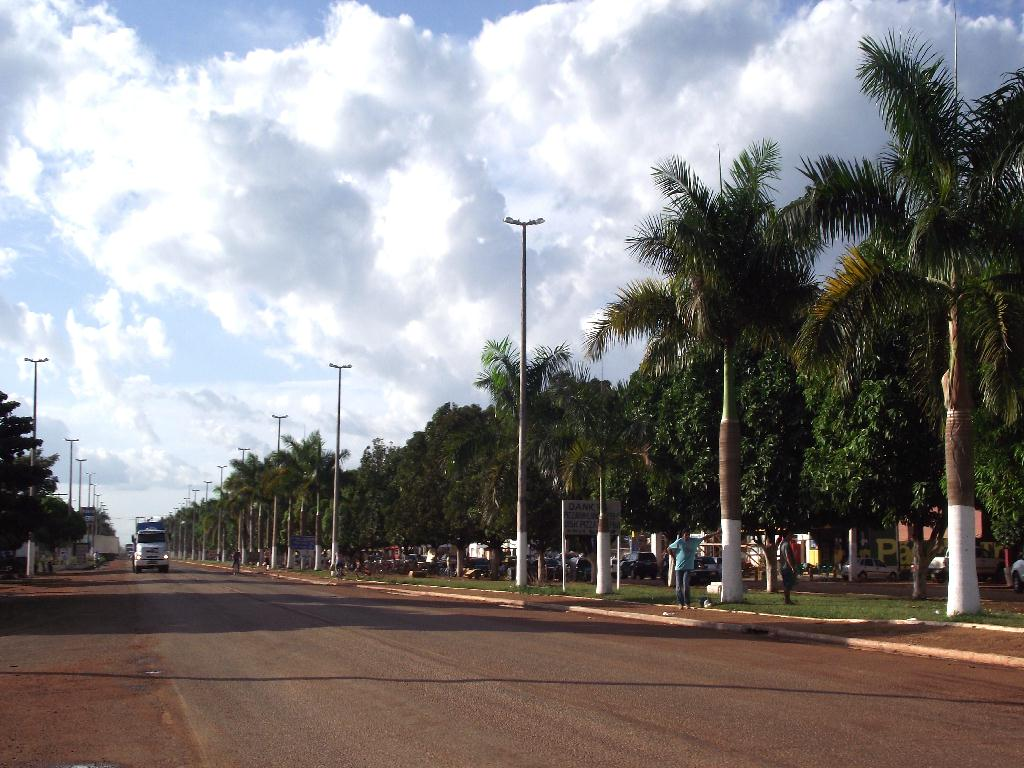
Line of trees in BR-010 at Dom Eliseu.

The first person in the municipality, Leopoldo da Cunha established a warehouse in the area. He is one of the workers at Delta Engenharia, the construction company responsible for the PA-70 highway. Despite the completion of the highway, Cunha stayed at the junction of highways BR-010 and PA-70 . After a few months, his family moved to his warehouse. With his "business instincts", Cunha opens a restaurant at the junction. His restaurant became the first establishment and attraction of Dom Eliseu.

With pressure from the Military Government, families from Piauí, Maranhão, Bahia, Goiás and Minas Gerais moved to the village, and thus counted as the first settlers. The Brazilian Government encouraged the agricultural formation of the locality, giving land titles to these families.

The village that was formed at the junction was originally called Quilometro Zero (Kilometer Zero), because it is in the exact km 0 of the PA-70. Until in the 1970s when because of a plane crash that killed the then President of the Senate Filinto Müller, the people decide to rename the village in honor of the politician. The village was renamed Filinto Müller.

With a large plant deposit, the Amazon Rainforest, the region began to experience the timber cycle from 1970 onwards. They settled in the village of Filinto Müller, the first logging mill was established in the village. The establishment of this type was Serraria Alves Marques Ltda. Logging in the area inflates, and soon several other activities flourished in the locality, especially trade.

On September 14, 1983, Filinto Müller was elevated to the category of district of the municipality of Paragominas. At the suggestion of federal deputy Fausto Fernandes, the village was again renamed, giving it the name of Dom Eliseu, in honour of the bishop Dom Eliseu Maria Coroli, prelate of Diocese of Bragança do Pará.

=== Fight for emancipation ===
In the mid-1980s, the Associação de Desenvolvimento Comunitário de Dom Eliseu (Dom Eliseu Community Development Association) was created in the municipality. This association led the process of discussions and proposals that culminated in the political emancipation of Dom Eliseu. This association managed to pressure the city council of Paragominas to approve the proposal for independence. The emancipatory process was carried out in the Legislative Assembly of Pará by the deputies Maria Nazaré Barbosa and Nicias Ribeiro.

With the approval of the plebiscite by the state legislature, its realization was determined. Once the plebiscite was held, it was found that there was approximately 70% approval for emancipation. Given the favorable result, municipal emancipation was approved on May 1, 1988, through state law No. 5,450.

On January 1, 1989, the municipal executive power was installed, with the mayor Antônio Jesus de Oliveira and the vice-mayor Antônio Dionísio Lima at the head. Both had been elected in the first municipal election, on November 15, 1988, with 65% of the valid votes. On the same occasion, the nine representatives of the municipal legislative power were elected.

=== Plebiscite on Carajás ===
In the 1990s, after municipal emancipation, Dom Eliseu joined the Association of Municipalities of Araguaia and Tocantins and joined the movement for the emancipation of Southern Pará via the CMPC (Municipal Committee for Carajás), which had as President the then councilman Eldo José Ribeiro, to create the state of Carajás. In 2011, more than 90% of the population of the municipality voted in favor of the emancipation of Carajás in the plebiscite on the division of the state of Pará. However, 66.40% of the population of Pará is against it, Dom Eliseu is one of 39 municipalities that voted in favor

=== 2000s ===
In 2005, TV Atlântico was inaugurated as Dom Eliseu's first television station.

In 2004, former/current President Luiz Inácio Lula da Silva under his administration initiated the Plano de Açao para Prevenção e Controle do Desmatamento na Amazônia Legal (Action Plan for Prevention and Control of Deforestation in the Amazônia Legal) to prevent the endangerment of the Amazonian rainforest. The plan brought together 13 government ministries, federal police, and the military to coordinate forest preservation and straighten enforcement actions in the Amazonian region. Although it help protects the rainforest, Dom Eliseu's deforestation rate is still high. By 2008, the municipality's forest cover went from 46% in 2003 to 37% in 2008.

In January 2008, the Ministry of Environment added Dom Eliseu on a list of 36 municipalities that contributed to more than 50% of the combined destruction of the Amazon rainforest. To avoid getting sanctioned by the government, the municipal government had to persuade over 1,000 landowners to comply with environmental laws.

Fortunately, in the mid 2010s, the Instituto de Homem e Meio Ambiente da Amazônia (Imazon), which previously helped Paragominas received a grant of 9.74 million Brazilian real (US$4 million) from the Brazilian Development Bank to support the registration and environmental management of the Cadastro ambiental rural (CAR) in Dom Eliseu, Paragominas, and 9 others.

=== Natal do Bob Esponja event of 2013 ===
In December 2013, a Christmas event took place in the municipality called "Natal do Bob Esponja" which features the crude mascot of SpongeBob SquarePants, Minne Mouse and an mascot from a local Brazilian cartoon show. TV Atlântico aired commercials regarding to the event.

=== Attack on Dom Eliseu of 2018 ===
In August 2018, a pick-up truck with people with firearms and explosives opens fire nearby to the Dom Eliseu branch of Banco do Brasil at midnight. Bullet shells scattered in the road nearby to the bank, few people were injured by the attack.

== Geography ==
Dom Eliseu is situated in a flat surface with the elevation of 180m.

=== Vegetation ===
Due to its flat surface, it made farming in Dom Eliseu easier, and also nearby creeks in the municipality made farms spread over the area of Dom Eliseu.

== Demographic ==
Dom Eliseu Population Growth in the years
Years	Population	Growth Rate
1961	1	+1%
2021	61,206	+61,206%

Dom Eliseu's main language is Portuguese (Brazil). However, some schools offer English classes.

== Economy ==
The first economic activity in Dom Eliseu was commerce, due to the characteristic of the settlement, and the restaurant by the first settler of Dom Eliseu (Leopoldo da Cunha). Soon after, the timber industry gained prominence, which led a huge economic cycle, lasting from the 1970s to the 1990s. However, given the predatory nature of the activity itself, it disappeared in the 1990s, due to the exhaustion of plant resources and intense monitoring by Brazilian environmental protection agencies.

Agriculture, growing as a parallel activity, gained projection after the closure of many logging companies (including Serraria Alves Marques Ltda). Dom Eliseu is one of the municipalities of the so-called "Fronteira agrícola Amazônica", the largest producing region commodities agriculture in this part of the Brazilian territory. The most prominent agricultural commodity in the municipality is the guava. The municipality is also prominent in the production and processing of bovine derivatives.

=== Agriculture ===
The first agricultural crops in the area of Dom Eliseu began in the 1960s. The settlers extracted wood, in addition to growing rice, corn, and cassava, mainly for their own supply, with the small surplus being sold to nearby towns in Maranhão. As the area stated to develop, beans, black pepper, and rubber trees began to be grown.

Rice beans, corn and cassava are traditional crops and are found throughout the municipal area. Rice cultivation was introduced by southern immigrants, it is prominent in the municipality, concentrating one of the largest producers of this crop in the state of Pará.

=== Black pepper ===
Pipericultura (cultivation of black pepper) developed in the municipality area because of pest contamination "pepper fusariosis" of the traditional areas of cultivation in the northeast of Pará. Dom Eliseu immigrants from Japan use their knowledge of traditional cultivation techniques. This is responsible for the attraction of this agricultural culture in the Southeast of Pará (Dom Eliseu)

=== Cattle ===
After the death of the logging activity in Dom Eliseu, which occurred during the 1990s, cattle raising became one of the "flagship" of the local economy. It is a very dynamic activity having a preponderant influence on the other activities of the municipality. The activity is extensive and is distributed throughout the municipality. The municipality's cattle herd is mainly intended for cutting. At the same time, the cattle herd of the municipality accounts for the eighth largest milk basin in Pará. Much of the meat and milk production is destined to supply the markets of São Luís, Marabá and Belém.

=== Guava ===
Guava cultivation is the highlight among the municipality's economic activities. There are approximately 6,000 hectares of guava-planted area in Dom Eliseu. It started around 1999 when a private company based in Dom Eliseu that has a history of processing fruits and produce sweets, wanted someone to buy it from. With support from Emater and the creation of a "Demonstration Unit" in 2004. Thanks to the interest of farmers in the crop, the agricultural market in Dom Eliseu boosted. In 2005, around 25,000t of guava sweets was surpassed in the municipality.

=== Industry, trade and services ===
Until the 1990s, Dom Eliseu's industrial park centred almost exclusively on logging. There were many rolling mills, sawmills and plywood factories that operated in the municipality. With the decline of timber resources and the greater rigor of environmental agencies in the inspection, the industrial chain of wood practically extinguished. It was a difficult period for the municipality, as it saw a large part of its industrial establishments shut down.

By then, the municipality is a center of timber and charcoal industries, which relies on illegally extracted wood. Because of those industries, and other municipalities have a mindset of logging, illegal logging and others. The state of Pará has been often nicknamed "Brazil's Wild West".

Due to the shrinking of industries that is based on logging activities, the other sectors mainly related to agroindustry, flourished in the city. The capital's idleness that was linked to logging activities migrated, and gave rise to grain processing industries (mainly rice) supplying the demand of both Dom Eliseu, as well as the surrounding municipalities. The big highlight in the agro-industrial sector are the activities related to the cultivation and processing of organic guava.

Thanks to its warehouse status, Dom Eliseu has a relatively dynamic commercial and service sector. And it is one of the busiest municipalities in the southeast region of Pará. The intense traffic of people and vehicles benefits activities related to commerce, which ends up providing assistance not only to Dom Eliseu, but also to neighboring municipalities. The trade in Dom Eliseu is very dynamic, has several shops, medium and large supermarkets, many fairs and the Municipal Market has varied products of Pará culture. Financial and mechanical services are also prominent thanks to the location of the municipality's headquarters.

In leisure, the city has several restaurants, bars, clubs, public squares, sports courts, snack bars, changing rooms and the municipal theater. The Agricultural Fair of the city is one of the largest in the region, in the event there are several attractions such as large shows, rodeos, amusement park, auctions and attracts people from all regions and moves the local economy. Another great event that takes place in the municipality is the Cavalcade of Dom Eliseu, traditional event of the city.

=== Banks ===
Dom Eliseu has branches of Banco do Brasil, Bradesco, Caixa, Banco do Estado do Pará, Banco da Amazônia, Banco Sicredi, and Correios.

== Tourism and Recreation ==
Although there is nothing valuable to see in Dom Eliseu, the municipality is home to a park called Seringal. The municipality offers hotels for tourism and visitors from different cities and towns.

== Culture ==
=== Religion ===
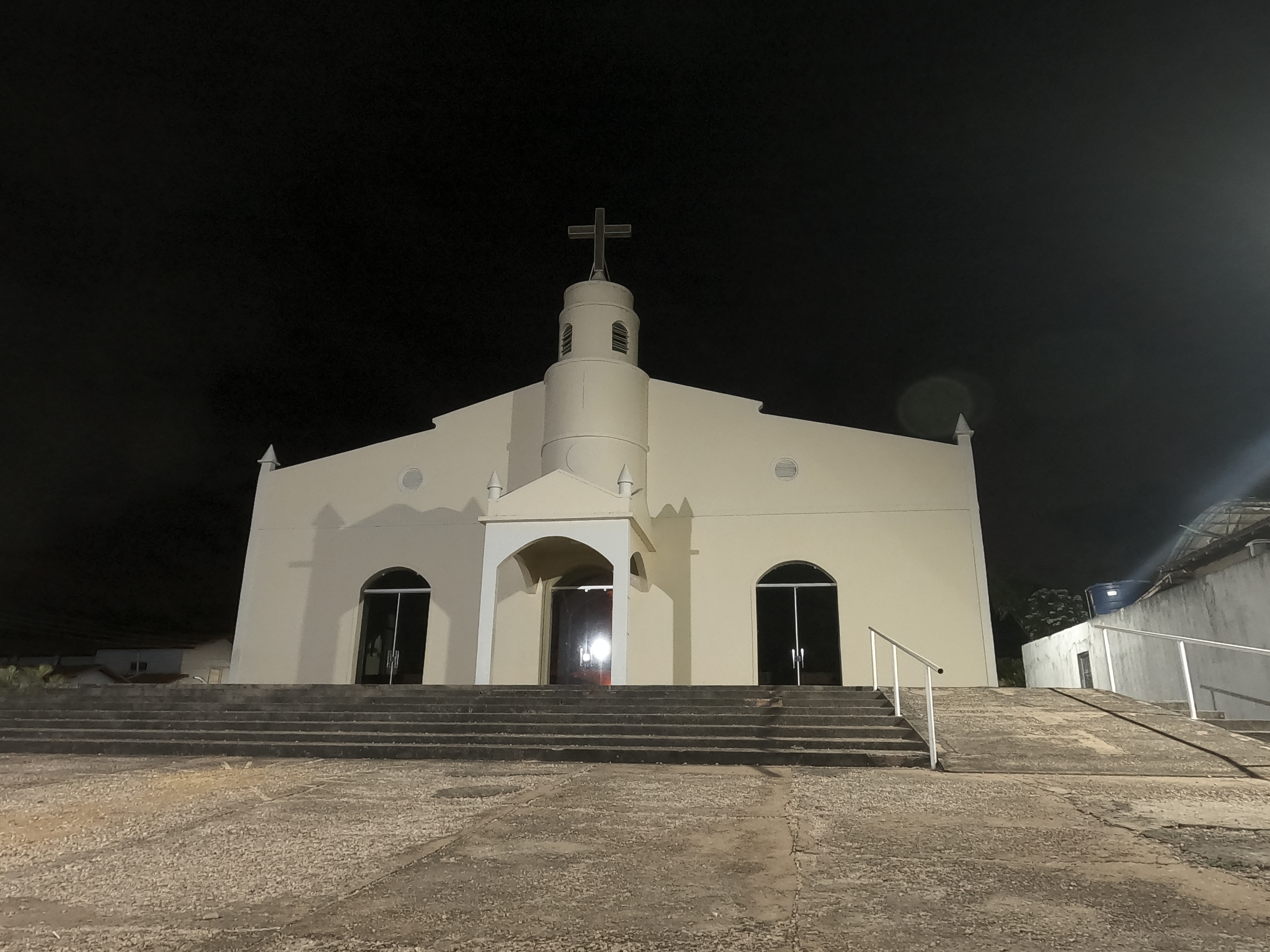
Paróquia Nossa Senhora do Perpétuo Socorro-Itinga do Pará

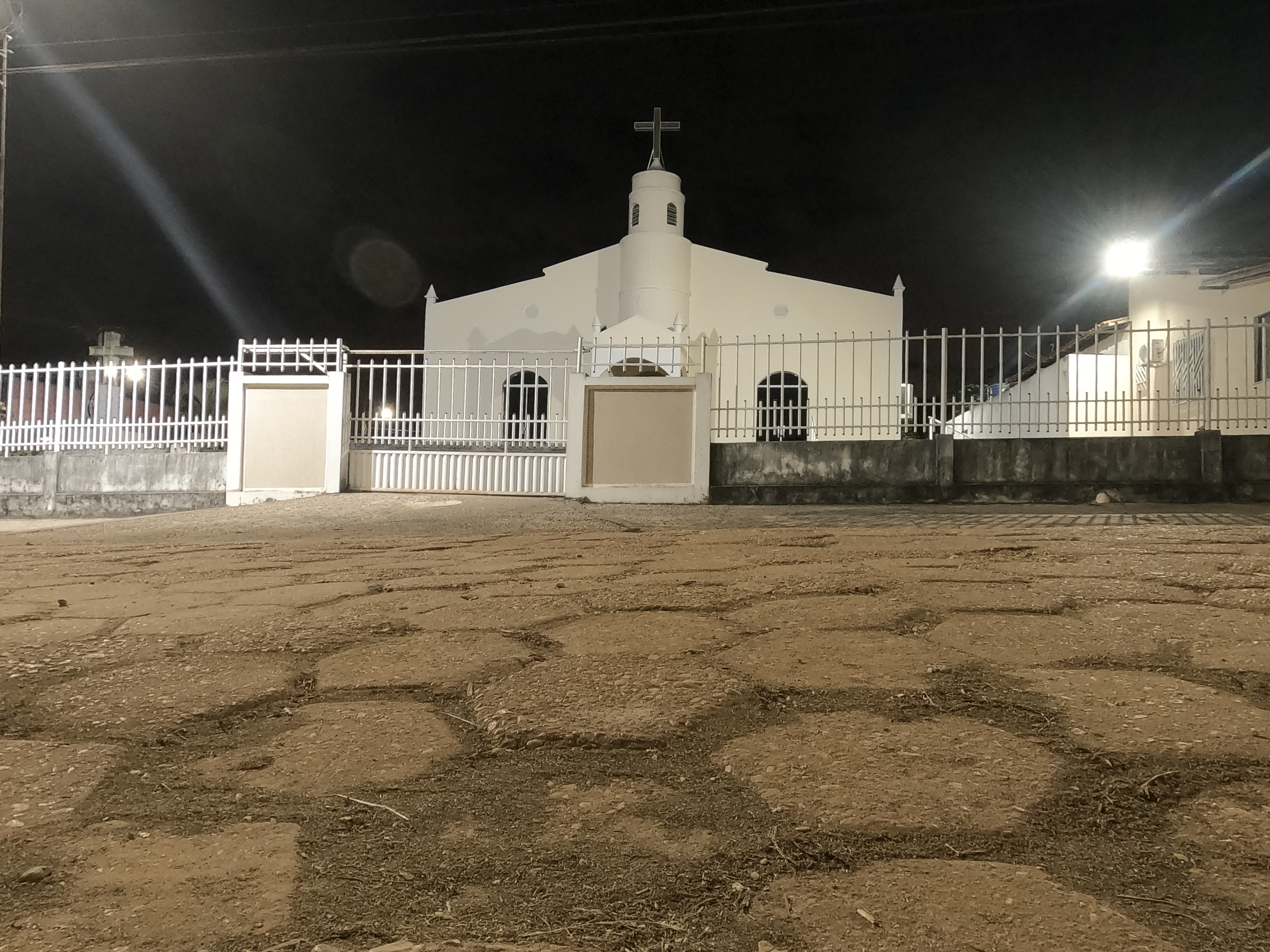
Paróquia Nossa Senhora do Perpétuo Socorro-Itinga do Pará (different view)

Because Brazil is the most Catholic country in the Western Hemisphere, churches are everywhere in the country. In Dom Eliseu, there are multiple churches in the municipality, but the main one is the Paróquia Nossa Senhora do Perpétuo Socorro-Itinga do Pará church.

=== Others ===
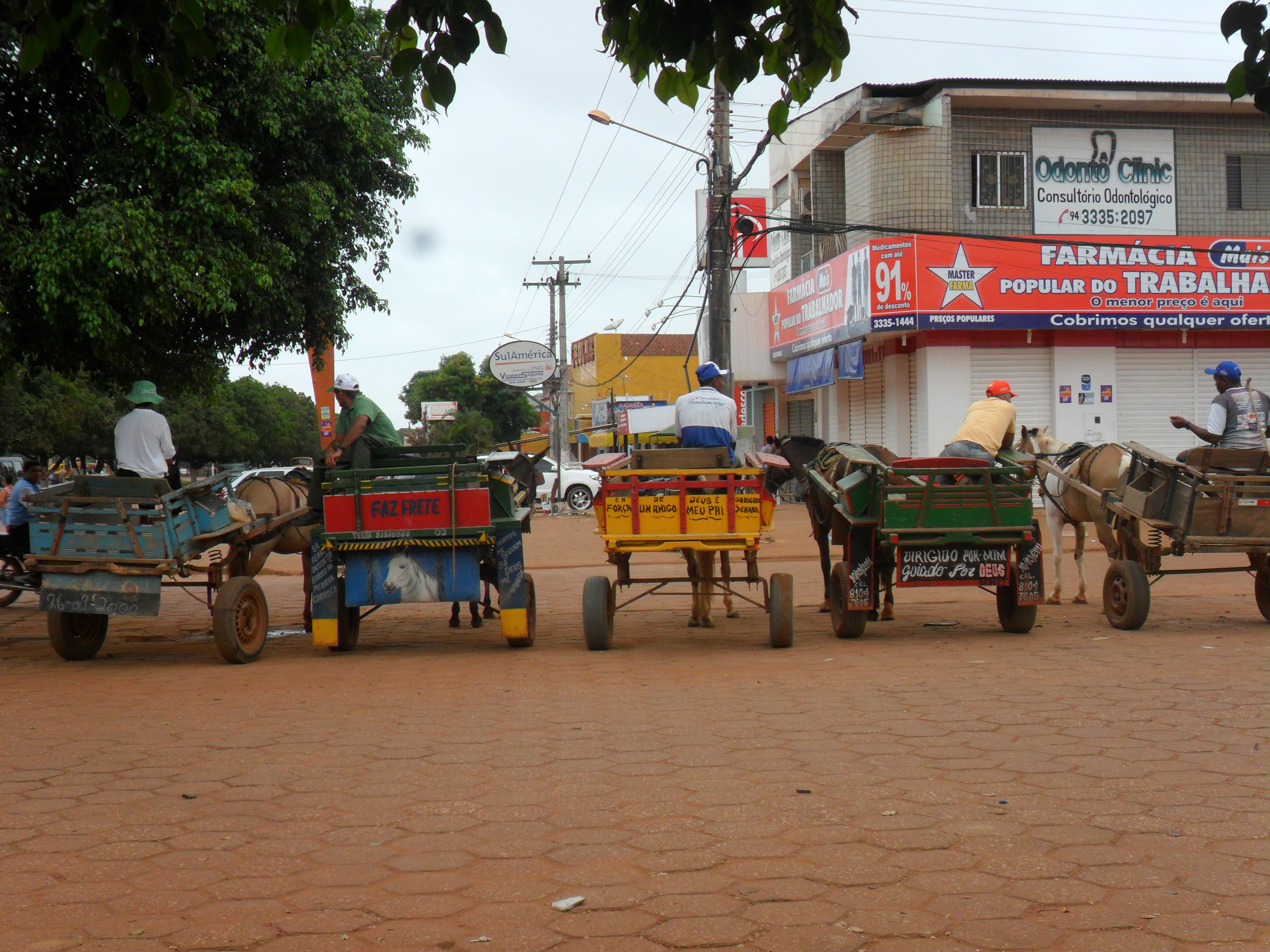
Donkey-taxis in line are parked next to the bus terminal of Dom Eliseu.

== Education ==
Dom Eliseu has the highest score in the IDEB index in the state of Pará . In 2023, students in the early years of the city's public school system have an average score of 5.4 in the IDEB.

== Health ==
Dom Eliseu's infant mortality rate is 4.72 per 1,000 births. 73.5 per 1,000 inhabitants were hospitalized due to diarrhea.

== Transport ==
Dom Eliseu has a fleet of over 14,089 vehicles. The municipality is crossed by highways BR-010 and BR-222 (formally PA-70). The municipality has a bus station with busses traveling to different towns and cities. Taxis also run through and in the city.

Dom Eliseu serves the Pista de Pouso Dom Eliseu (Aeroporto Dom Eliseu), the municipality's only airport. Dom Eliseu's ICAO code is SSFU.

BR-222 connects Dom Eliseu to Marabá and Fortaleza (Ceará) while BR-010 connects the municipality to Distrito Federal, Paragominas and ends in Santa Maria do Pará.

=== Access ===
The BR-010 and BR-222 highways are the major access points to the city. Bus routes from a city or town to Dom Eliseu serves as a minor access point to the city.

Nearby municipalities can access Dom Eliseu via air travel, thanks to the Pista de Pouso Dom Eliseu.

== Infrastructure ==
=== Communication ===
The city has three television stations: two relays (RBA TV on channel 4 and TV Liberal on channel 7) and only one locally originated station, Prime TV (formerly TV Atlântico), a SBT affiliate. Prime TV also operates a digital signal, while RBA TV's digital relay station is pending its start.

Stations	Affiliate	Frequency	Digital Frequency
RBA TV	Band	4	
TV Liberal	TV Globo	7	7.1
Prime TV	SBT	9	9.1

=== Telecommunications ===
There are numerous telecommunication companies situated in Dom Eliseu, but one of the majors are TV Cidade, a telecommunications service provider. And Brasil Eletrônica which is a telephone answering service.

=== Houses ===
Houses in Dom Eliseu are mostly made of bricks, concrete and roof shingles. Which is typical for a normal city mostly within the "Amazônia Legal", few houses in the municipality are made with shipping containers.

=== Sports ===
Dom Eliseu is home to Estadio Frederico Gomes Dias, a soccer field.

=== Education ===
Dom Eliseu has several municipal, state and private schools. In 2023, the municipality has around 37 primary schools and 5 secondary schools.

=== Health ===
In 2009, over 10 hospitals in Dom Eliseu exists. Some of the hospitals are municipal hospitals.

=== Roads ===
Most roads in Dom Eliseu are paved with an octagonal pattern and poorly maintained, some roads are not paved. Since it is up to the municipal government to take care of roads, most roads and streets are left behind.

=== Highways ===
BR-010 connects Dom Eliseu to Northwest Pará and Maranhão, meanwhile BR-222 (formally PA-70) connects the municipality to Marabá, both of the highways are paved.

=== Transportation ===
Aside from the two highways, Dom Eliseu has a bus station, with buses leaving the municipality for all regions of Brazil. And it also has a 1.3 km runway.

== Agriculture ==
Map of the Fronteira agrícola Amazônia, Dom Eliseu is inside of the red.

Dom Eliseu is part of the "Fronteira agrícola Amazônica", one of the largest agricultural area in Brazil. Cities and towns that are situated in the red area have high concentrations of crops.

Dom Eliseu is home to a 150,000 hectare crop that sustains the municipality with surplus of food for use and export. There are also numerous farms with their own respective storage, type of crop and crop production around the municipality. The following are examples of crop from Dom Eliseu:

• Tree farm

• Guava

• Corn

• Rice

• Soybeans

• Sesame

• Wheat

• Cassava

== See also ==
- List of municipalities in Pará
- List of places in Brazil named after people
