= Prime TV (Dom Eliseu) =

- Dom Eliseu, Pará; Brazil
- City: Dom Eliseu
- Channels: Analog: 9; Digital: 9.1; Virtual: 26
- Branding: Prime TV

Programming
- Affiliations: Sistema Brasileiro de Televisão

Ownership
- Operator: Prefeitura Municipal de Dom Eliseu

History
- Founded: January 1, 2005

Links
- Website: https://sbtdomeliseu.com.br

Prime TV (formerly TV Atlântico and TV Cidade Dom Eliseu) is a Brazilian television station in Dom Eliseu, in the east of the state of Pará. The station is a Legal Amazon RTV station (television retransmitting station) owned by the municipal government.

== History ==
It is unknown when did TV Atlântico start broadcasting. As of 2006, the station was licensed to SAT - Sistema Atlântico de Telecomunicações, which was registered on March 2 that year. Until 2014, the station was owned by Raimundo Euclides Santos Neto, alias "Quidão", who was in charge of the station's administration and general management. The station was not part of the ANATEL database in July 2012. In early 2014, an interview given to governor Simão Jatene in the 2012 electoral campaign caused a political controversy, leading to the ineligibility of Quidão and Jhonas Santos de Aguiar (president of the PSDB committee for Dom Eliseu since 2012) until 2020. Its facilities as TV Atlântico were auctioned off in the early 2020s.

The station as of 2017 was known as TV Cidade de Dom Eliseu and since 2021, it adopted the current name Prime TV.

== Programming ==
The station produces Jornal da Prime. In addition to local programming, the channel has made national and international success by airing several independent productions.

Prime TV airs a children's program, Xou da Laluche, since December 2022, presented by singer Laluche. Laluche appeared on Teleton AACD in 2023. The station also airs Escolinha do Humor Kids, from the same producer, since August 2024, on a Saturday morning slot before Luccas Neto's show on the network. Both programs are also available on the station's official YouTube channel.

Since September 8, 2024, the station airs A Fonte em Foco, produced by real estate publication A Fonte, airing on Sunday mornings.

== Technical information ==
Virtual channel	Digital channel	Picture resolution	Content
9.1	35 UHF	1080i	Prime TV / SBT

Prime TV started its digital broadcasts on or before January 30, 2025.
