= Itinga do Maranhão =

Coordinates: 4.45°S 47.5258°W

- Municipality
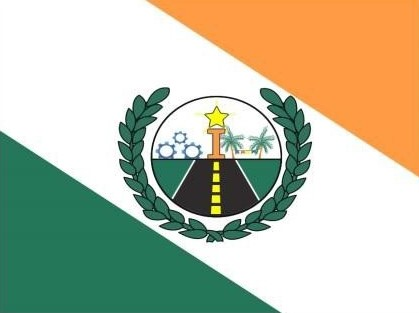
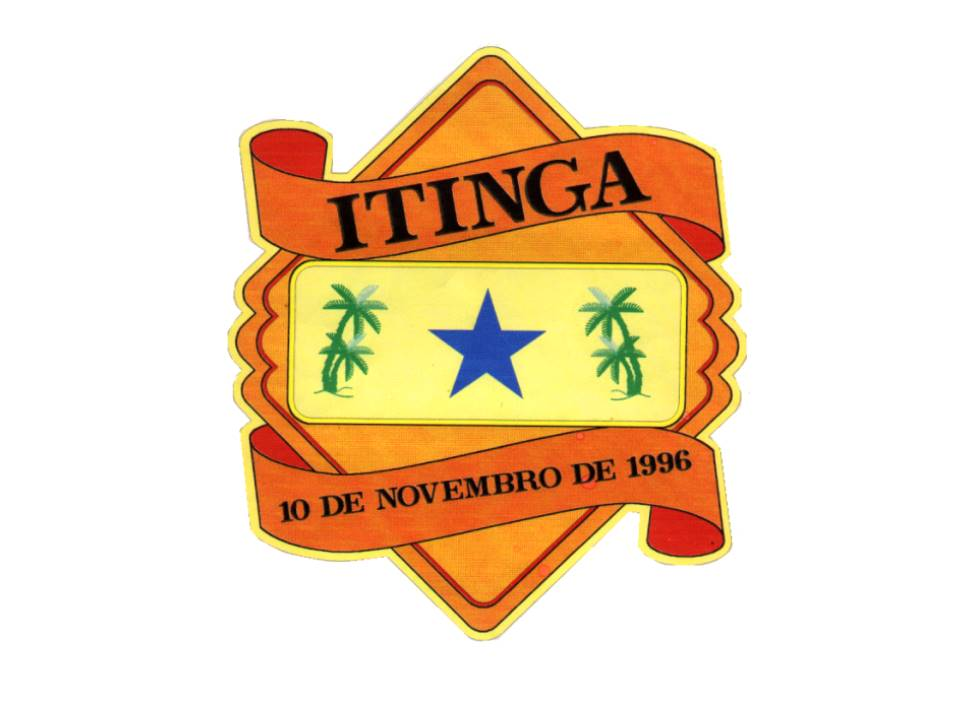
- Flag Coat of arms
- Interactive map of Itinga do Maranhão
- Country: Brazil
- Region: Nordeste
- State: Maranhão
- Mesoregion: Oeste Maranhense
- Neighboring municipalities: Açailândia , Imperatriz , Ulianópolis , Dom Eliseu (Pará)

Population (2020)
  - Total: 26,068
- Time zone: UTC -3

Itinga do Maranhão is a municipality in the state of Maranhão in the Northeast region of Brazil.

Itinga has a population of 26,000 inhabitants, according to IBGE 2019 estimates, and 3,596.99 km² in territorial extension, the 19th largest municipality in area in the state. Founded in 1994, its main source of income is the timber industry, livestock and the service sector.

The municipality is in intense conurbation with Vila Bela Vista, a district of the city of Dom Eliseu in Pará , inheriting more cultural characteristics from the neighboring state than from the state itself.

== See also ==
- List of municipalities in Maranhão
