= Miguel Maria Giambelli =

Brazilian Catholic prelate

Miguel Maria Giambelli, B.
- Bishop of Diocese of Bragança do Pará Emeritus
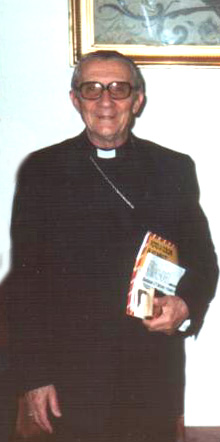
- Bishop Giambelli in 1990
- Church: Roman Catholic Church
- See: Diocese of Bragança do Pará
- In office: 1980–1996
- Predecessor: Eliseu Maria Coroli
- Successor: Luigi Ferrando

Orders
- Ordination: July 4, 1943

Personal details
- Born: March 23, 1920 Flero, Italy
- Died: December 26, 2010 (aged 90)

Miguel Maria Giambelli (March 23, 1920 – December 26, 2010) was a Brazilian prelate of the Roman Catholic Church.

Giambelli, born in Flero, Italy was ordained a priest on July 4, 1943 from the Roman Catholic religious order Clerics Regular of Saint Paul. He was appointed Bishop of the Diocese of Guamá on April 21, 1980 and was ordained bishop on June 15, 1980. The diocese would be renamed to the Diocese of Bragança do Pará in October 1981. Giambelli served until his retirement on April 10, 1996

== See also ==
- Diocese of Bragança do Pará
- Clerics Regular of Saint Paul
