= Eliseu Maria Coroli =

Brazilian Catholic prelate

Eliseu Maria Coroli, B.
- Bishop Emeritus of Diocese of Guamá
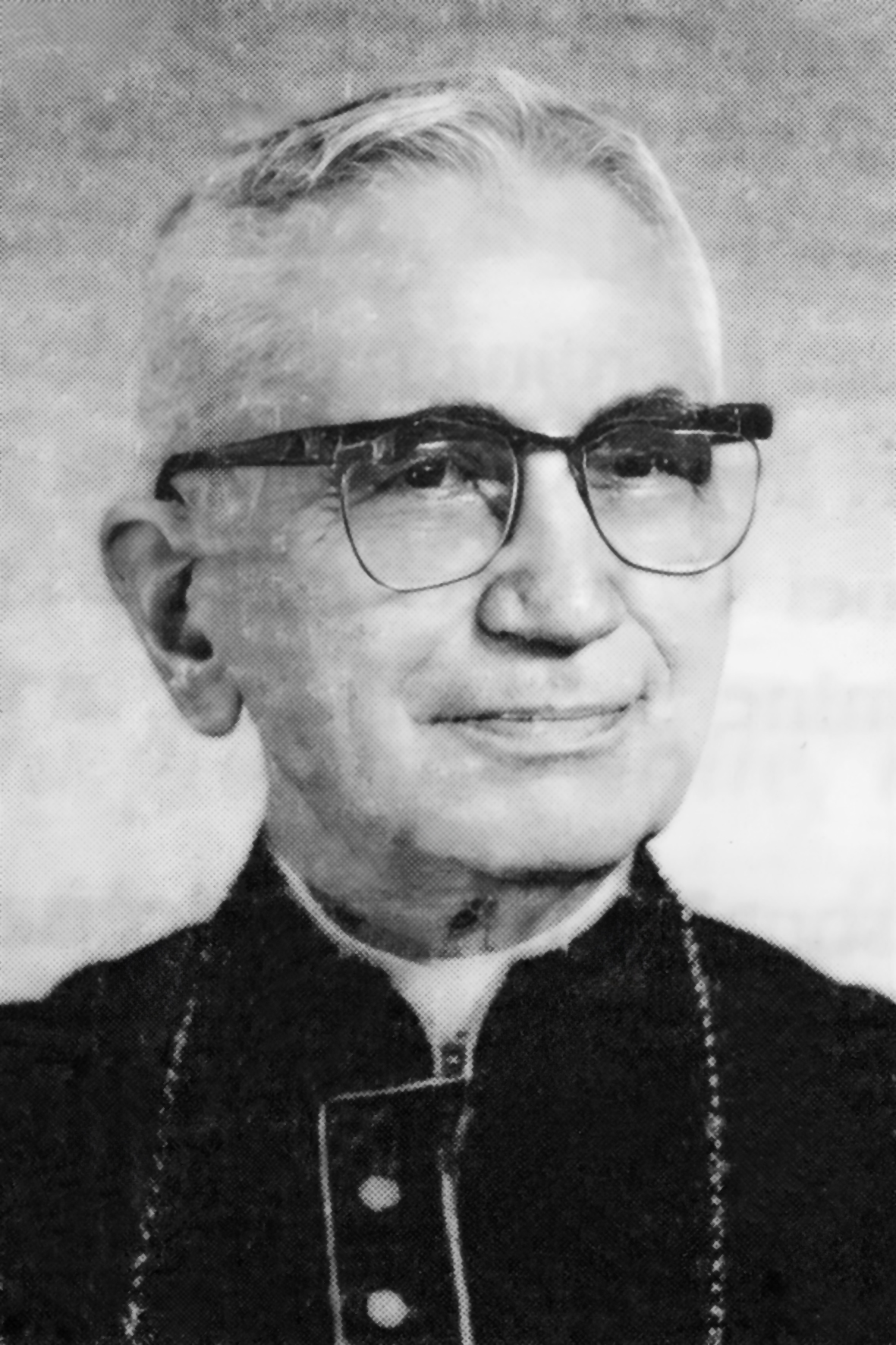
- Bishop Coroli in 1974 for his 50 years of priesthood
- Church: Roman Catholic Church
- See: Diocese of Bragança do Pará
- In office: 1940–1977
- Successor: Miguel Maria Giambelli

Orders
- Ordination: March 15, 1924

Personal details
- Born: February 9, 1900 Castelnovo Val Tidone
- Died: July 29, 1982 (aged 82) Bragança do Pará
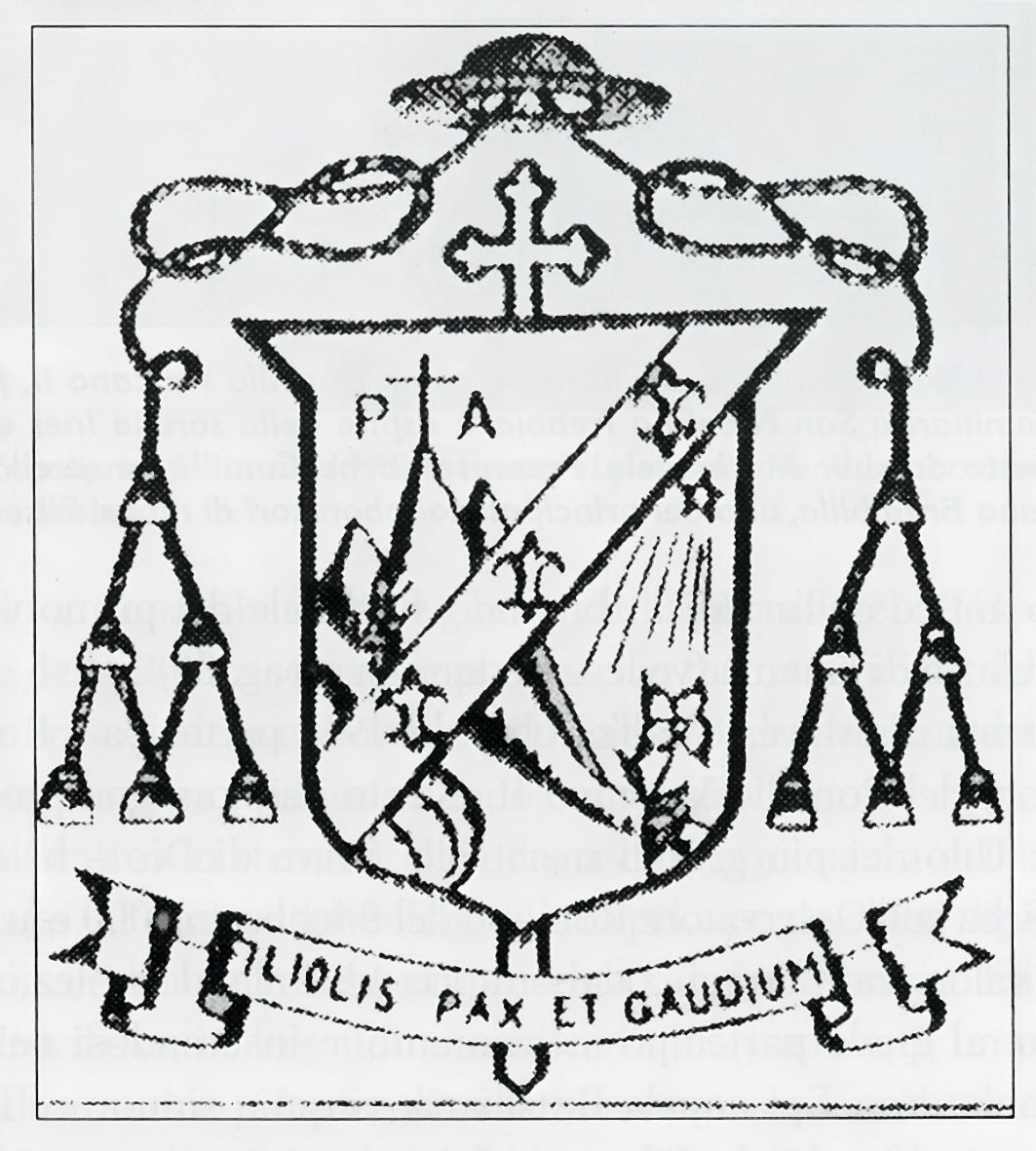
- Coat of arms

Eliseu Maria Coroli (February 9, 1900 – July 29, 1982) was an Italo-Brazilian prelate of the Roman Catholic Church.

== Biography ==
Coroli, born in Castelnovo Val Tidone, frazione of Borgonovo Val Tidone, was ordained a priest on 1924 from the Roman Catholic religious order Barnabites. He was appointed Prelate of the Prelature of Guamá on 1940 and was ordained bishop on October 13, 1940.

He opened several kindergartens, primary schools, and the Sant'Antonio Maria Zaccaria Hospital within the prelature. He also devoted himself to the media, founding Rádio Educadora (Bragança), a radio station dedicated to promoting culture among the population, especially children.

The diocese would be renamed to the Diocese of Bragança do Pará in October 1981. Coroli served until his retirement on February 5, 1977. He died on July 29, 1982, and was buried in the cathedral of Bragança do Pará.

The cause for beatification was opened in 1996. In Brazil the municipality of Dom Eliseu is dedicated to him.

== See also ==
- Diocese of Bragança do Pará
- Clerics Regular of Saint Paul

== Gallery ==
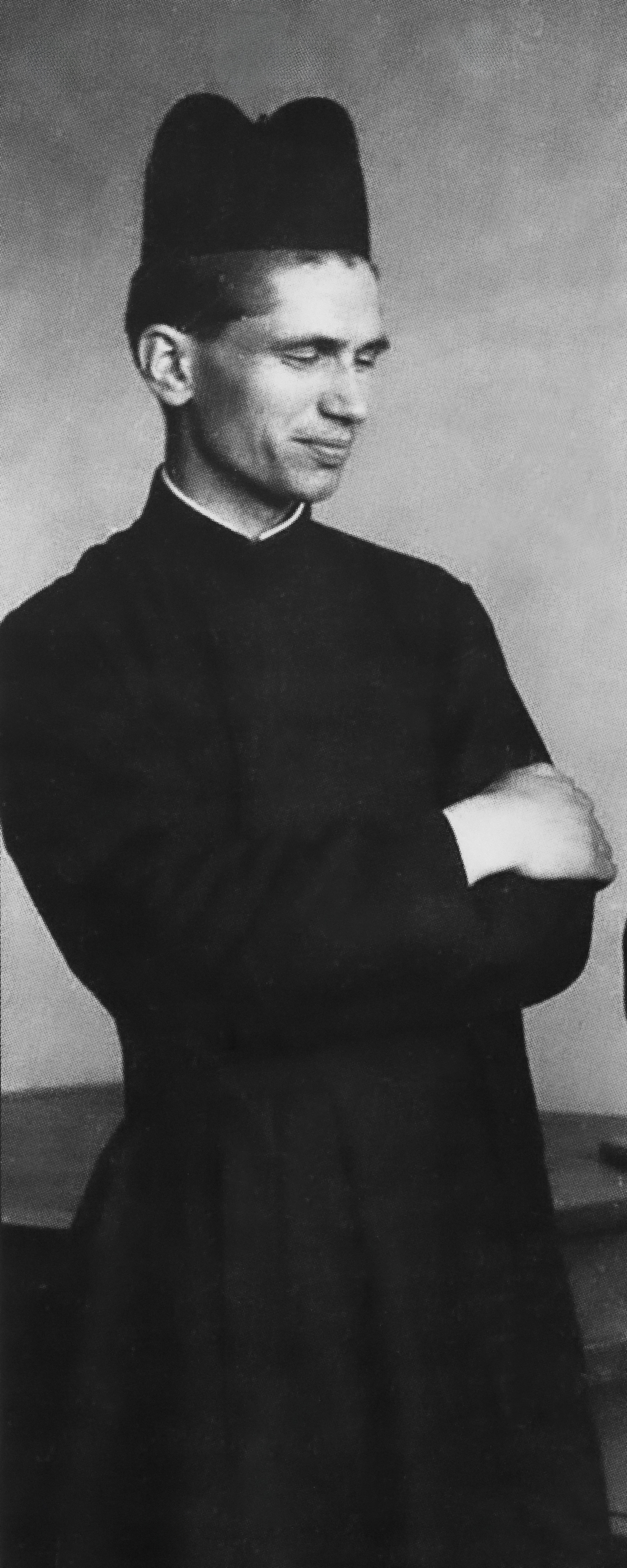
Bishop Coroli, just ordained priest, in 1924.
