= Ulianópolis =

Coordinates: 3.75583°S 47.5008°W

- Municipality
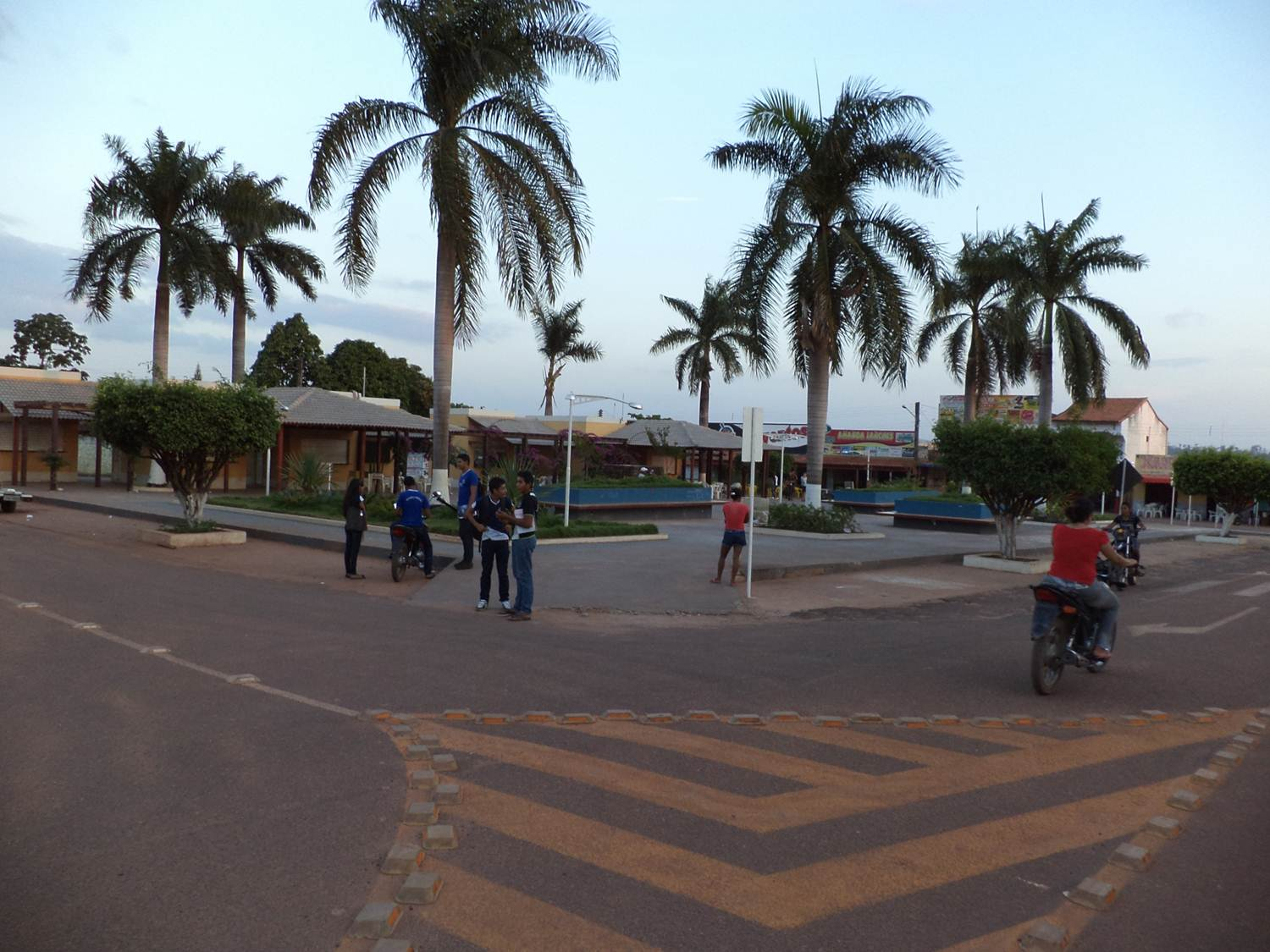
- Ulianópolis

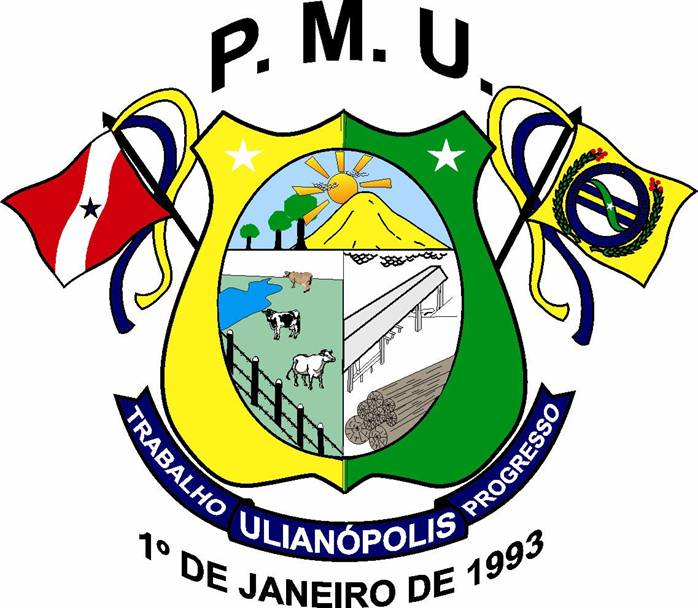
- Flag Coat of arms
- Nickname: Sweetest City of Pará
- Interactive map of Ulianópolis
- Location in Brazil
- Country: Brazil
- Region: Northern
- State: Pará
- Mesoregion: Sudeste Paraense
- Microregion: Microregion of Paragominas
- Neighboring municipalities: Dom Eliseu, Paragominas and Itinga do Maranhão (MA).
- Distance to Capital: 400 km
- First settled: 1958
- Emancipation: December 13, 1991
- District seat established: January 1, 1993

Government
  - Mayor: Kelly Cristina Destro (2025, 2028) (MDB)
  - Deputy Mayor: Evanuria de Oliveira Castro

Area
  - Municipality: 1,961.812 sq mi (5,081.069 km^{2})
  - Urban: 3.98 sq mi (10.31 km^{2})
- Elevation: 430 ft (130 m)

Population (2020)
  - Municipality: 60,761
  - Rank: 4th (Microregion of Paragominas) 16th (Pará)
- Demonym: ulianopoliense or ulianopolense
- Time zone: UTC−3 (BRT)
- Postal code: 68632-000
- GDP per capita: R$ 61,737.21
- Municipal Human Development Index (MHDI) [2010]: 0.604
- Website: ulianopolis.pa.gov.br (City Hall)

Ulianópolis is a municipality in the state of Pará in the Northern region of Brazil. Located in the Microregion of Paragominas, it is named after the Uliana family.

== History ==
The municipality began in 1958 when pioneers set up a small camp under a Cumaru tree, near a stream. The camp manager, Bernardo Sayão, upon seeing the small watercourse, thought it was the Gurupí River. Upon learning that it was only a tributary of the Gurupí River, Sayão named it the Gurupizinho River. The settlement which also began to be called Gurupizinho housed several families in the 1960s, attracted by the colonization projects in the Amazon and the ease of obtaining land in the region. Among the first families to arrive is the Uliana family, whose name gave rise to the current name of the municipality.

The place, which received many migrants from other states, mainly Espírito Santo, was initially known as Gurupizinho dos Capixabas. The construction of the Belém–Brasília Highway brought more migrants from various parts of the country, in 1988 an emancipation movement began which eventually made Gurupizinho, now Ulianópolis a municipality by State Law No. 5,697, of December 13, 1991, separated from the municipality of Paragominas. The district seat was established on January 1, 1993.

== Geography ==
Located at the latitude of 03°44'31" south and longitude of 47°29'41" west, at an attitude of 130 meters above sea level.

== Infrastructure ==
=== Highways ===
Ulianópolis' main highways are the BR-010 which connects the municipality from Dom Eliseu to Belém (via BR-316) and the PA-125 which connects the municipality from itself to Paragominas.

=== Roads ===
In 2022, around 36.61% of streets have trees.

=== Hospitals ===
In 2009, the Sistema Único de Saúde (SUS) has over 7 health establishments.

=== Households ===
11.1% of households have adequate sanitation, 36.1% are located on public roads with trees and only 3% are on public roads with adequate urbanization.

== Transportation ==
Paragominas has a fleet of over 7,065 vehicles.

Amount (2025)	Type
7,065	All
1,242	Automobiles
0	Streetcar
298	Trucks
146	Tractor trucks
632	Pickup trucks
72	Pickup trucks
0	Chassis platform
15	Moped
38	Minibuses
3,208	Motorcycles
861	Scooters
75	Buses
0	Quad bike
150	Trailer
244	Semi-trailer
0	Sidecar
0	Tracked tractors
1	Wheeled tractors
20	Tricycle
62	Utility
1	Other

== See also ==
- List of municipalities in Pará
- List of places in Brazil named after people
