= Luigi Ferrando =

20th and 21st-century Italian Catholic bishop

- Bishop of Diocese of Bragança do Pará
- Church: Roman Catholic Church
- See: Diocese of Bragança do Pará
- In office: 1996-2016
- Predecessor: Miguel Maria Giambelli B.
- Successor: Jesús María Cizaurre Berdonces O.A.R.

Orders
- Ordination: 1 May 1965 by Mgr Paolo Ghizzoni
- Consecration: 5 May 1996 by Cardinal Ersilio Tonini

Personal details
- Born: 22 January 1941 (age 84); Agazzano

Luigi Ferrando (Dom Luís; born 22 January 1941) is the emeritus bishop of the Roman Catholic Diocese of Bragança do Pará.

== Biography ==
Ferrando was born in Agazzano, in the Province of Piacenza. He was ordained priest on 1 May 1965, by the auxiliary bishop of the Roman Catholic Diocese of San Miniato, Paolo Ghizzoni.

On 5 May 1996, Ferrando received episcopal ordination of Bragança do Pará from cardinal Ersilio Tonini. He replaced the previous bishop of Bragança Miguel Maria Giambelli; he was the first non-Barnabite bishop of Bragança from its elevation. Ferrando retired on 17 August 2016.

== Awards ==
Ferrando received the "Antonino d'oro" of the Province of Piacenza.

== Resources ==
- Profile of Mons. Ferrando, catholic-hierarchy.org. Accessed 9 April 2024.
