= Diocese of Bragança do Pará =

Catholic ecclesiastical territory

Coordinates: 1.0555°S 46.7661°W

Diocese of Bragança do Pará Dioecesis Brigantiensis de Para Diocese de Bragança do Pará

Catholic
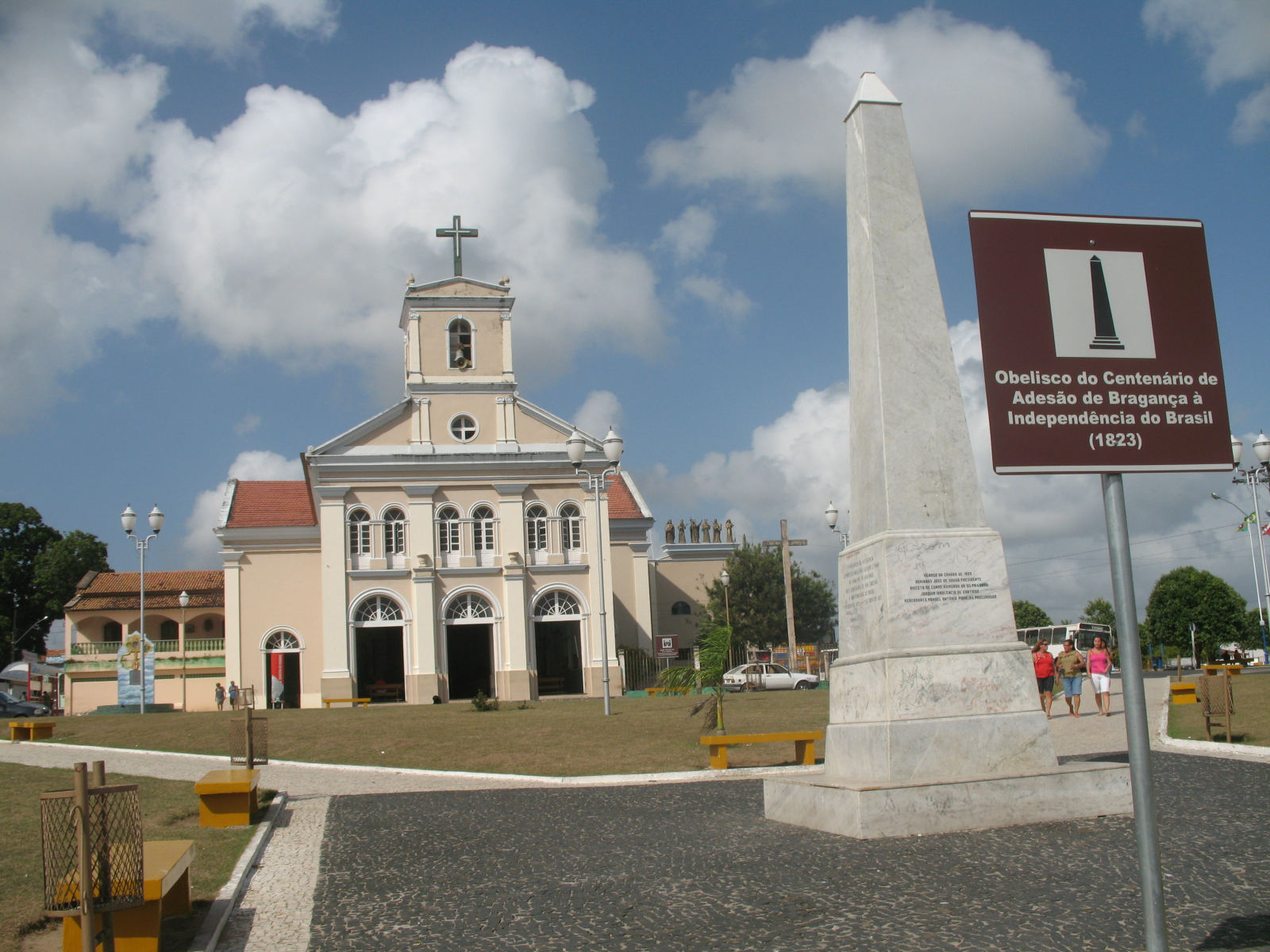
- Cathedral of Our Lady of the Rosary

Location
- Country: Brazil
- Ecclesiastical province: Belém do Pará
- Metropolitan: Belém do Pará

Statistics
- Area: 69,084 km^{2} (26,673 sq mi)
- Population: Total; Catholics: (as of 2023); 1,130,000; 799,000 (70.7%)
- Parishes: 29

Information
- Denomination: Catholic Church
- Sui iuris church: Latin Church
- Rite: Roman Rite
- Established: 14 April 1928; 98 years ago
- Cathedral: Cathedral of Our lady of the Rosary in Bragança, Pará
- Secular priests: 55 (44 Diocesan, 11 Religious Orders)

Current leadership
- Pope: Leo XIV
- Bishop: Raimundo Possidônio Carrera da Mata
- Metropolitan Archbishop: Júlio Endi Akamine, S.A.C.
- Bishops emeritus: Luigi Ferrando; Jesús María Cizaurre Berdonces, O.A.R.

Website
- Official website

The Roman Catholic Diocese of Bragança do Pará (Latin: Dioecesis Brigantiensis de Para) is a diocese located in the city of Bragança do Pará in the ecclesiastical province of Belém do Pará in Brazil.

== History ==
- 14 April 1928: Established as Territorial Prelature of Gurupi from the Metropolitan Archdiocese of Belém do Pará
- 3 February 1934: Renamed as Territorial Prelature of Guamá
- 16 October 1979: Promoted as Diocese of Guamá
- 13 October 1981: Renamed as Diocese of Bragança do Pará

== Bishops ==
- Prelates of Guamá (Latin Rite)
  - Eliseu Maria Coroli, B. (10 August 1940 – 5 February 1977), resigned
- Bishops of Guamá (Latin Rite)
  - Miguel Maria Giambelli, B. (21 April 1980 – 13 October 1981 see below)
- Bishops of Bragança do Pará (Latin Rite)
  - Miguel Maria Giambelli, B. (see above 13 October 1981 – 10 April 1996), retired
  - Luigi Ferrando (10 April 1996 – 17 August 2016), retired
  - Jesús María Cizaurre Berdonces, O.A.R. (17 August 2016 – 15 May 2024), resigned
  - Raimundo Possidônio Carrera da Mata (15 May 2024 – Present)

=== Other priest of this diocese who became bishop ===
- Manoel de Oliveira Soares Filho (1993-2018), appointed Bishop of Palmeira dos Índios, Alagoas

== Sources ==
- GCatholic.org
- Catholic Hierarchy
