= BR-222 (Brazil highway) =

Highway in Brazil

BR-222

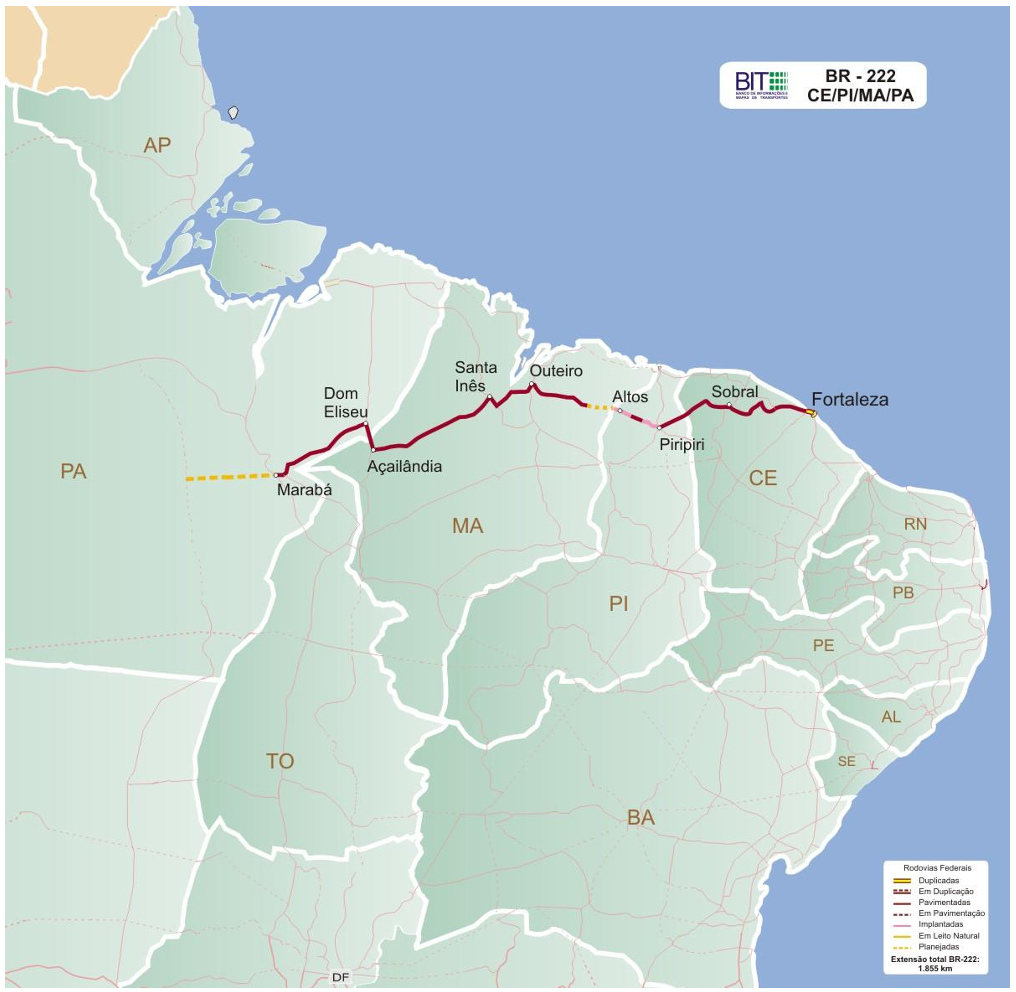

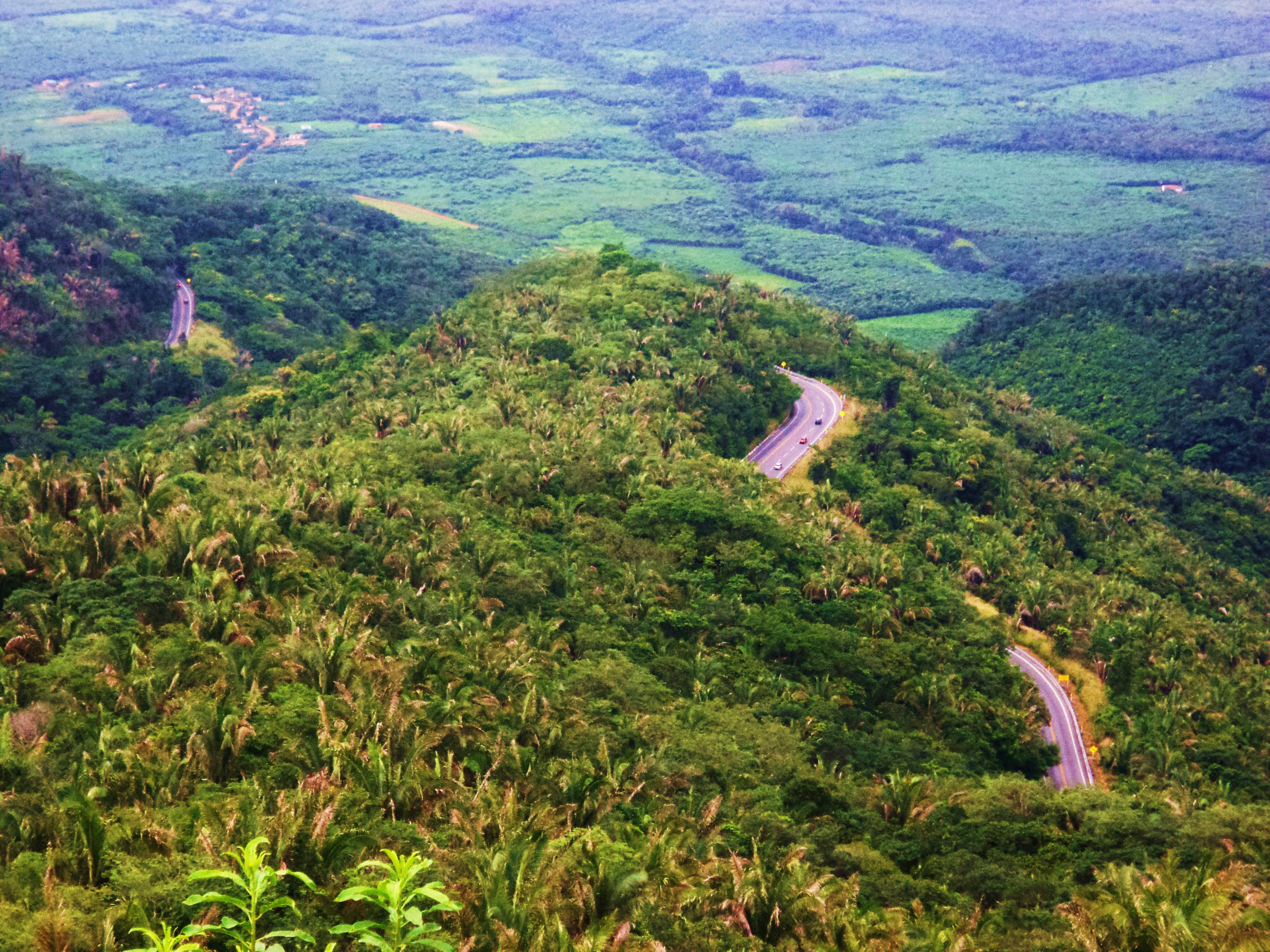
- BR222 in the Serra da Ibiapaba, between Piauí and Ceará

Route information
- Length: 1,819.8 km (1,130.8 mi)

Major junctions
- East end: Fortaleza, Ceará
- West end: Marabá, Pará

Location
- Country: Brazil

Highway system
- Highways in Brazil; Federal

The BR-222 is a Brazilian federal highway that connects the cities of Fortaleza, in the state of Ceará, to Marabá, Pará. It has a total length of 1,819.8 km.

It passes through large urban centers, such as Fortaleza (where a 14 km section to the Fortaleza ring road has been converted into a dual carriageway), connecting economically rich regions, such as the southeast of the state of Pará with the rest of Brazil. Under its current route, after the federalization of the Estrada do Rio Preto in the municipality of Marabá, it will integrate the mining regions into the national territory. The highway is being upgraded into a dual carriageway specifically by the federal government through the DNIT, between Caucaia and Porto do Pecém in Ceará.
