= Agriculture in Brazil =

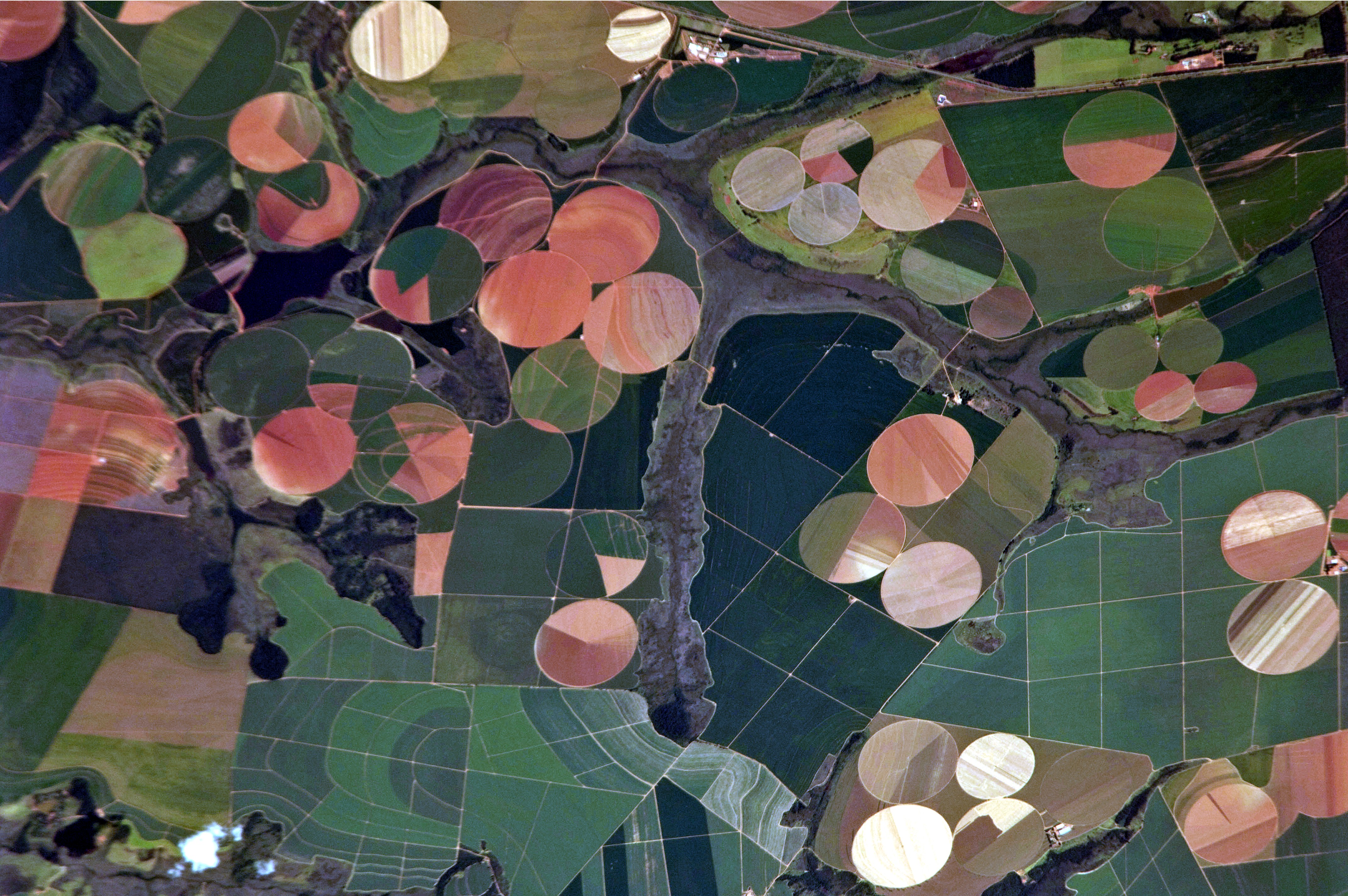
- Agricultural fields near Perdizes, Minas Gerais
- Cultivated land: 96.3 million ha (2023)
- Agricultural land (% of land area): 28.6% (2021)
- Rural population (% of total population): 12% (2022)
- Main products: Soybeans, soybean meal, maize, cane sugar, coffee, cotton, beef, poultry, pork, cocoa, fruits, orange juice, açaí, brazil nuts, tobacco, sugar, organic honey, guaraná, cellulose, cassava, sisal fiber, ethanol

Production
- Grains: 322.8 million tons (2022)

Major products
- Cane and derivatives: 630.7 million tons (2020)
- Soy: 154.6 million tons (2022)
- Corn: 131.9 million tons (2022)

Participation in the economy
- Crop value: R$830.1 billion (US$148.42 billion) (2022)
- Contribution to GDP: 4.53% (2008)
- Agribusiness GDP (Rural industry and trade, livestock and agriculture): 26.46% (2008)

Development of agricultural output of Brazil in US$ in 2015 since 1961

The agricultural sector in Brazil is historically one of the principal bases of Brazil's economy. In 2024, Brazil was the second-biggest grain exporter in the world, with 19% of the international market share, and the fourth overall grain producer. Brazil is also the world's largest exporter of many popular agriculture commodities like coffee, soybeans, organic honey, beef, poultry, cane sugar, soybean meal, açai berry, orange juice, yerba mate, cellulose, tobacco, and the second biggest exporter of cotton, corn, pork, and ethanol. The country also has a significant presence as producer and exporter of rice, wheat, eggs, refined sugar, soybean oil, cocoa, beans, nuts, cassava, sisal fiber, and diverse fruits and vegetables.

The southern one-half to two-thirds of Brazil has a semi-temperate climate, higher rainfall, more fertile soil, more advanced technology and input use, adequate infrastructure and more experienced farmers. This region produces most of Brazil's grains, oilseeds, and agriculture exports.

The drought-ridden northeast region and Amazon basin lack well-distributed rainfall, good soil, adequate infrastructure and development capital. Although mostly occupied by subsistence farmers, both regions are increasingly important as exporters of forest products, cocoa and tropical fruits. This geographic disparity in agricultural development has been compounded by unequal land ownership. This structural condition has influenced rural social movements throughout Brazil's modern history. Central Brazil contains substantial areas of grassland. Brazilian grasslands are far less fertile than those of North America, and are generally suited only for grazing.

Extreme weather events like drought, linked with deforestation and climate change, increasingly impact Brazilian agriculture. Experts consider a forest-friendly economy the best method to sustain the Brazilian agricultural sector, because deforestation presents severe dangers to it.

== Brazil's agricultural production in 2018 ==
In 2018, Brazil:

- It was by far the largest world producer of sugarcane (746.8 million tons). The 2nd place, India, produces about half of Brazil's production (376.9 million tons). Brazil uses much of the cane to produce ethanol, in addition to exporting a lot of sugar.
- It was the 2nd largest world producer of soy (117.8 million tons), second only to the United States. However, Brazil surpassed US soybean production in 2020.;
- It was the 3rd largest world producer of maize (82.2 million tons), third only to the US and China;
- It was the 5th largest world producer of cassava (17.6 million tons), fifth only to Nigeria, Thailand, Congo and Ghana;
- It was the largest world producer of orange (16.7 million tons);
- It was the 9th largest world producer of rice (11.7 million tons);
- It was the 3rd largest world producer of banana (6.7 million tons), third only to India and China. If we also consider the plantains, Brazil is the 7th largest producer;
- It produced 5.4 million tons of wheat;
- It was the 4th largest world producer of cotton (4.9 million tons), losing only to India, USA and China;
- It was the 10th largest world producer of tomato (4.1 million tons);
- It produced 3.6 million tons of potato;
- It was the world's largest producer of coffee (3.5 million tons);
- It was the largest world producer of guaraná (3.3 million tons);
- Produced 3.2 million tons of legume;
- It was the 3rd largest world producer of beans (2.9 million tons), third only to Myanmar and India;
- It was the 3rd largest world producer of pineapple (2.6 million tons), only to Costa Rica and the Philippines;
- It was the 5th largest world producer of coconut (2.3 million tons), losing to Indonesia, the Philippines, India and Sri Lanka;
- It was the 4th largest world producer of watermelon (2.3 million tons), losing to China, Iran and Turkey;
- It was the 7th largest world producer of sorghum (2.2 million tons);
- It was the 7th largest world producer of mango (including mangosteen and guava) (1.9 million tons);
- It was the 14th largest world producer of grape (1.6 million tons);
- It was the 14th largest world producer of onion (1.5 million tons);
- Produced 1.5 million tons of palm oil;
- It was the 5th largest world producer of lemon (1.4 million tons), losing to India, Mexico, China and Argentina;
- It was the largest world producer of açaí (1.3 million tons);
- It was the 13th largest world producer of apple (1.1 million tons);
- It was the 2nd largest world producer of papaya (1 million tons), second only to India;
- Produced 996 thousand tons of tangerine;
- Produced 897 thousand tons of oats;
- It was the 2nd largest world producer of tobacco (762 thousand tons), second only to China;
- It produced 741 thousand tons of sweet potato;
- It was the 14th largest world producer of peanut (563 thousand tons);
- It produced 546 thousand tons of yerba mate;
- It produced 330 thousand tons of barley;
- It was the 6th largest world producer of cocoa (239 thousand tons);
- It was the 6th largest world producer of avocado (235 thousand tons);
- Produced 199 thousand tons of natural rubber;
- It was the 6th largest world producer of persimmon (156 thousand tons);
- It was the 9th largest world producer of cashew nuts (141 thousand tons);
- It produced 135 thousand tons of sunflower;
- It was the largest world producer of Brazil nuts (36 thousand tons);

In addition to smaller productions of other agricultural products.

== History ==
=== Early farming ===
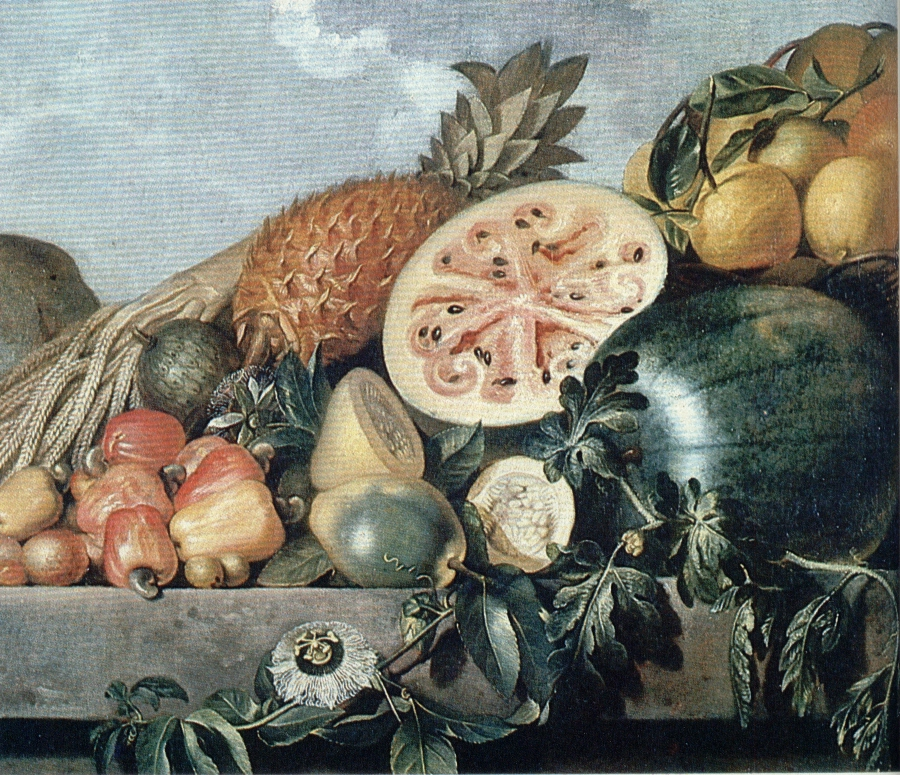
Brazilian fruits in a painting by Albert Eckhout

Pre-Columbian Indigenous peoples lived in the Amazon for 10,000 years before European arrival and evidence shows their presence 12,000 years before present day. Cultivation of the Amazon Basin by Indigenous peoples was carried out for millenniums before Europeans arrived over 500 years ago. Historical cultivation of Manioc, squash, guava, beans pequi, palm fruits, lerén, maize, and rice have been documented in the Amazon Basin between 4,000 and 10,400 years ago.

Following the arrival of Columbus to the Americas, the Jesuits, members of a branch of Catholicism landed in the Amazon in 1549 CE. From 1580 to 1640 CE the Jesuits enslaved Brazil's native Tupí tribes and forced them to collect cacao from the wild to fund the Jesuit endeavors. Structured cacao farming was introduced later in the 1660s and was dependent on Indigenous and African slave labor. Collection of wild cacao fell out of use as cacao plantations brought in more money and by the 1700s Indigenous workers were charged with planting and maintaining 40,000 cacao trees in Brazil by Jesuit force.

During the 1970s and 1980s approximately 10 million hectares of deforestation took place to make way for cattle farming. This action was combined with high rates of violence and mass dislocation of Native populations. Official reports claim that authorities in Brazil murdered over 8,350 Indigenous people throughout this time.

==== Fires ====
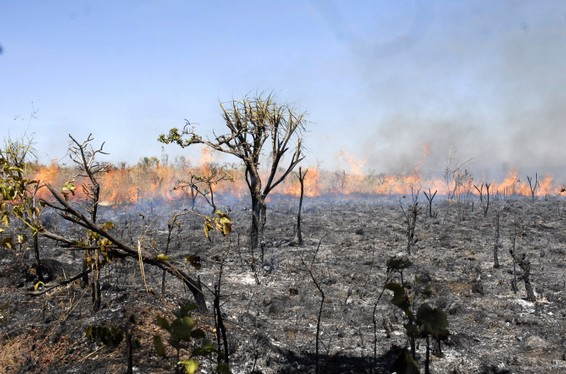
Fires are one of the problems still present in Brazilian agriculture.

Fire was used by Indigenous Brazilians as a land management tool for thousands of years. After European arrival around 1500, The Portuguese Crown's sesmaria grant system distributed vast landholdings to a limited number of colonial elite. This allocation of land to settlers led to concentrated ownership of large estates known as latifúndios. Once land was divided, settlers began monocropping and adopting burning far more aggressively than had been practiced under Indigenous land management. The combination of burning with these new farming practices decimated native flora.

==== International problems ====
Brazilian coffee production exceeded global demand at the beginning of the 20th century. This resulted in the Taubaté Agreement, where the State began acquiring surplus for destruction and planting seedlings was forbidden—with the goal of maintaining a minimum profitable price.

Rubber suffered from foreign competition. In 1870, English smugglers smuggled rubber tree seedlings out of Brazil and in 1895 began production in Asia. In the 1910s and 1920s this competition practically eliminated Brazilian production.

=== Agronomy schools ===
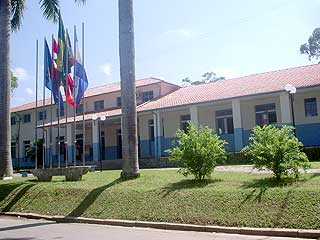
Entrance to the Agricultural School in Camboriú, of UFSC

In 1887 during the Empire era, the first school dedicated to the training of agronomists opened in the city of Cruz das Almas. In 1883, in Pelotas, Rio Grande do Sul, a second school opened.

The first school was officially recognized thirty-five years after its creation, with Decree 8.319/1910. The agronomist profession only came to be recognized in 1933. Seventy regular agronomy colleges operate in Brazil. The day the decree was publicized, 12 October, became the "Day of the Agronomist".

Professional registration is managed by Regional Engineering and Architecture Councils, integrated at the national level by CONFEA. Educational activity is supported by the Federation of Brazilian Agronomy Students.

=== Diversification: 1960–1990 ===
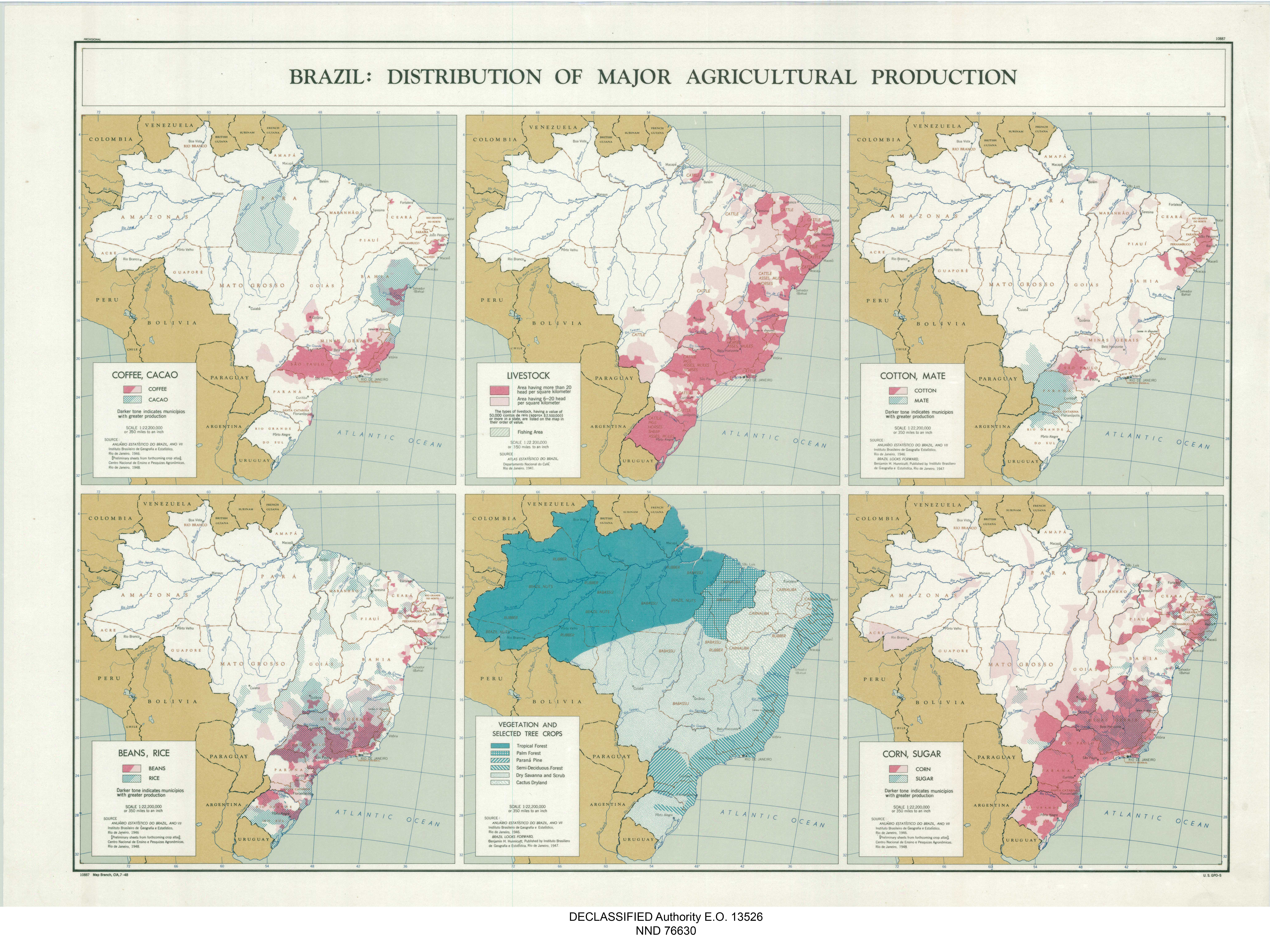
Agricultural production in the late 1940s

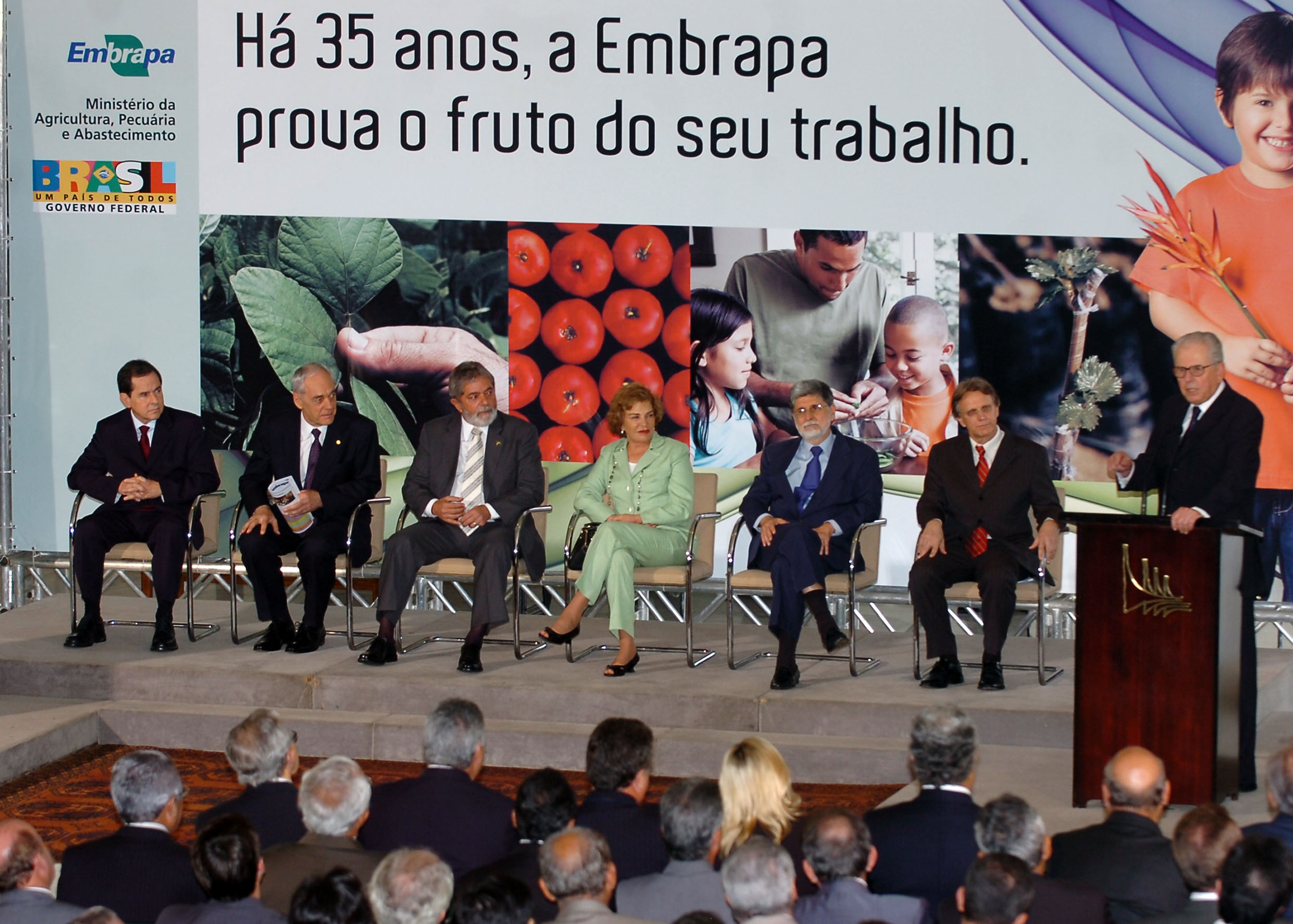
The former minister, Luis Fernando Cirne Lima, founder of Embrapa, speaking at the corporation's 35th anniversary conference

The Brazilian Enterprise for Agricultural Research (EMBRAPA) was established during the military regime in 1973 with the objective of diversifying production. The body was responsible for the support of new crops, adapted to the country's diverse regions. The expansion of agricultural borders towards the Cerrado had begun, and of monocultural latifundia with production at a semi-industrial scale of soybeans, cotton and beans. Czech-Brazilian researcher Johanna Döbereiner helped lead Brazil's Green Revolution, winning her the UNESCO Science Prize for her work on nitrogen-fixing microorganisms.

In 1960, four main agricultural products were exported, growing by the early 1990s to nineteen. Brazil also moved "downstream" to expand post-harvest processing. In the 1960s, unprocessed goods made up 84% of total exports, falling to 20% by 1990.

Agricultural promotion policies included subsidized credits, bank debt write-offs and export subsidies (in some cases, reaching 50% of the product value).

=== Pink Tide ===
The pink tide refers to a period of "left-leaning" politics in Latin America throughout the 21st century. For many countries this led to a period of "developmentalism" politics, designed by Raúl Prebisch in the 1950s at the United Nations Economic Commission for Latin America and the Caribbean. This economic philosophy centered reducing primary specializations, such as agricultural exports, in favor of important substitution industrialization. However, unlike many other countries in Latin America, when Brazil exited its military dictatorship, it's "pink tide" economic philosophy was more neoliberal in nature, focusing on reprimerization, including its agricultural commodities.

=== Mechanization: 1990s ===
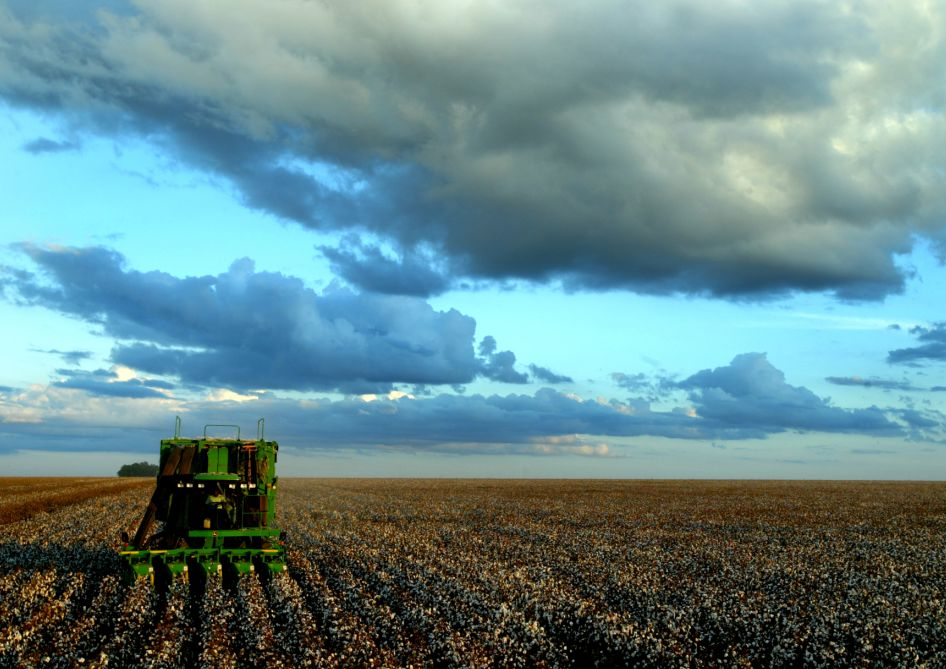
Harvester on a Brazilian cotton plantation

Beginning with the 1994 creation of Plano Real for monetary stabilization, Brazilian agriculture went through a radical transformation: the State cut subsidies and the market began to finance agriculture, leading to the replacement of manpower with machines. Brazil's rural population fell from 20,700,000 in 1985 to 17,900,000 in 1995, followed by a decrease in import taxes on inputs and other measures that forced Brazilian producers to adapt to global practices. The rise of productivity, mechanization (with reduction of costs) and professionalization marked that period.

=== Agrotechnology ===
Brazil's sugarcane cultivation has largely been for sugar production, but in the more recent decades it has been utilized for ethanol production. The global focus on sustainable energy production, has led to the expansion of biofuel crops such as sugarcane. Brazil has had an extremely attractive market for ethanol production due to their sugarcane genomics program which led to biotechnology startups and agro-biotech companies from across the globe to locate in the country.

== Irrigation ==
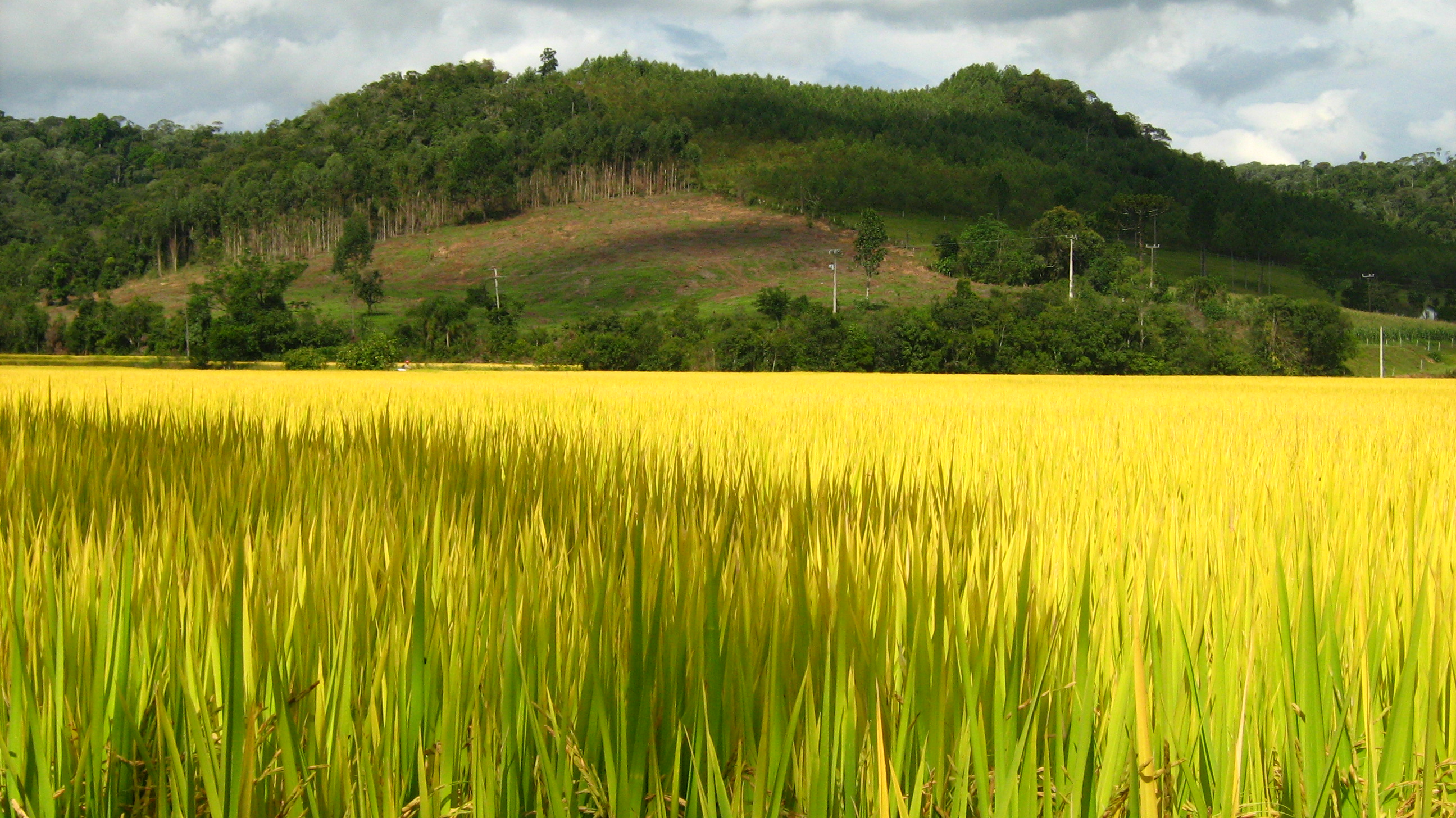
Rice paddy: Where irrigation first occurred in Brazil

The first irrigation experiments in Brazil occurred in Rio Grande do Sul, for cultivating rice. The first record dates to 1881 with the construction of the Cadro dam which began in 1903. However, the practice broadened in the last thirty years of the 20th century between the years 1970 to 1980.

Private initiative developed irrigation in the South and Southeast regions.

In the Northeast official bodies, such as DNOCS and CODEVASF, led the way beginning in the 1950s. In 1968, the Executive Group on Irrigation and Agrarian Development (GEIDA) was set up, and two years later it instituted the Multi-annual Program of Irrigation (PPI). The majority of resources were directed to the Northeast. These federal initiatives, however, did not achieve success. In 1985 a new guidance and in 1996 a new direction produced the New Model of Irrigation Project. The Project intended to broaden the use of irrigation in agriculture and drew on more than 1,500 national and foreign experts.

According to the World Bank, Brazil's irrigation potential is about 29,000,000 hectares (110,000 sq mi). In 1998, however, drought reduced capacity to only 2.98 million hectares.

At the end of the 20th century, the country primarily used surface irrigation (59%), followed by overhead (35%) and then targeted irrigation. The South represented the largest irrigated area (more than 1.1 million hectares), followed by the Southeast (800 thousand hectares) and Northeast (490 thousand hectares).

Currently, a regulatory milestone of irrigation is making its way through the National Congress of Brazil, through bill 6381/2005, which aims at replacing the Law 6662/1979, which regulates irrigation policy.

Water resources policy is regulated by Law 9433/1997, and managed by the National Council.

== Infrastructure ==
=== Storage ===
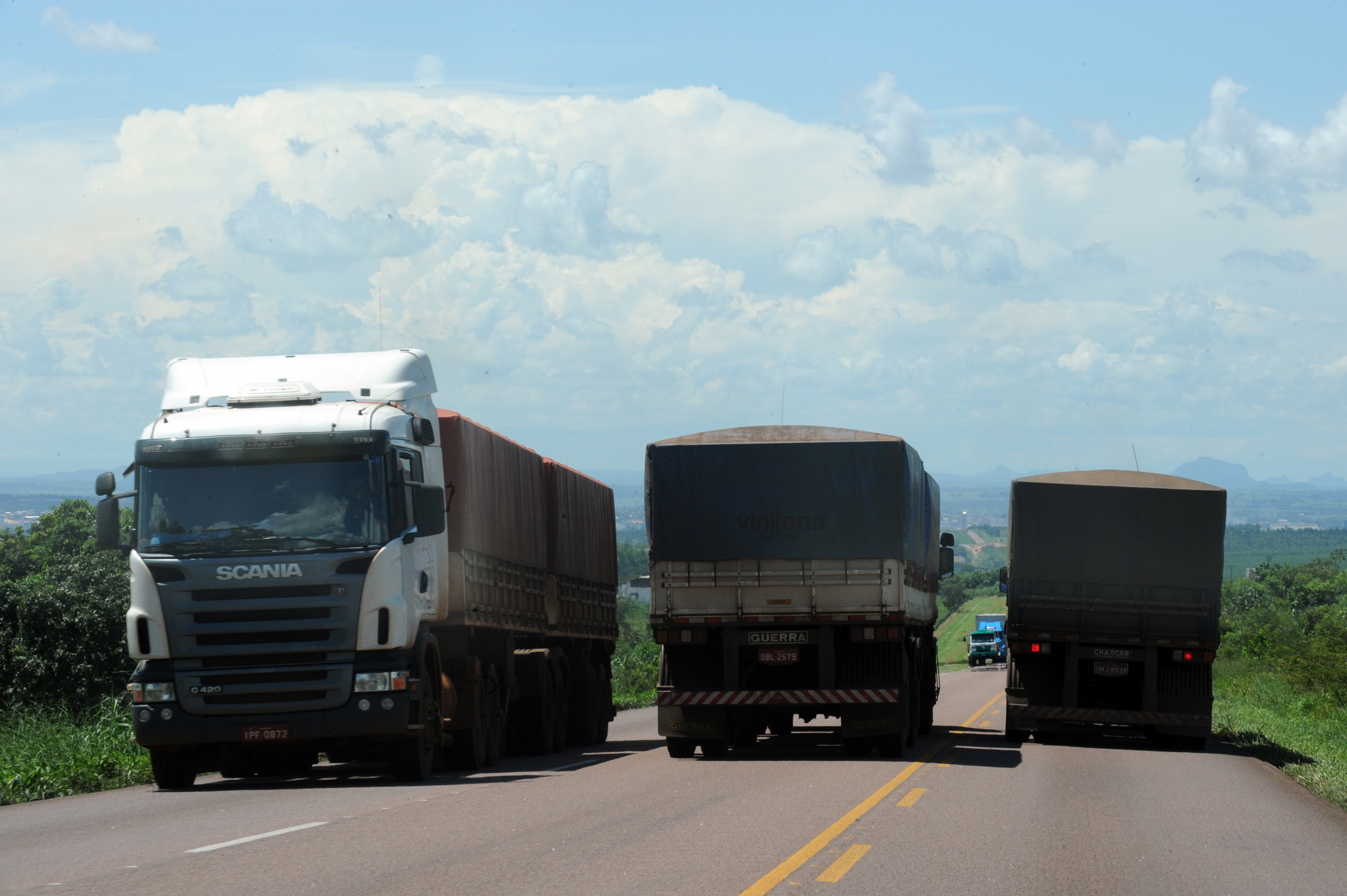
Trucks transporting soybean crop

Crop storage facilities require expansion in order to keep up with increasing production. Brazilian storage capacity in 2003 was 75% of grain production, well short of the ideal of 120%.

Farm-based crop storage (e.g., using silos) is not common in Brazil. Lack of storage forces produce to be commercialized quickly. According to Conab data, only 11% of warehouses are located on farms (by comparison Argentina has 40%, the European Union has 50% and Canada has 80%). Farmers rely on third party storage services.

Lack of access to capital, exacerbated by financial instability from factors such as exchange rate volatility, prevents most producers from building significant storage.

=== Transport ===
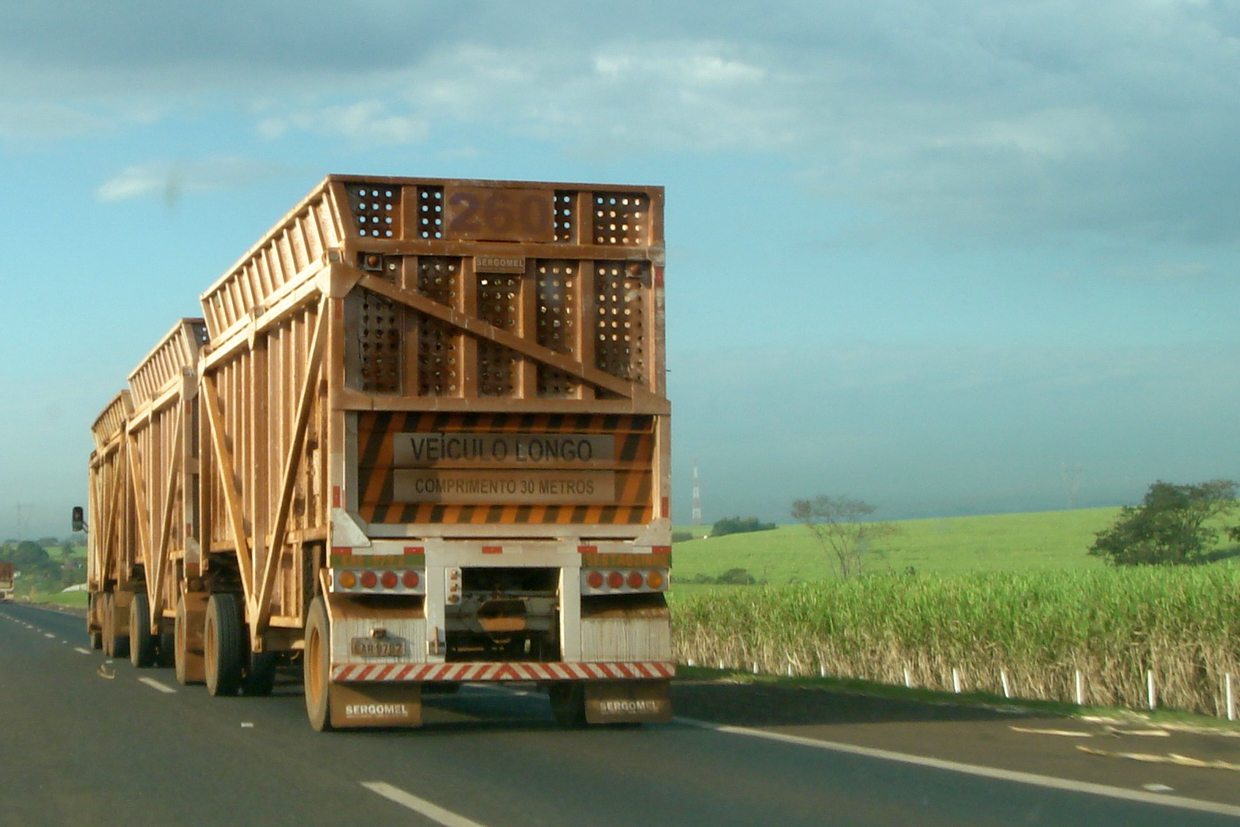
Transport of crops by highway

Crop transport is a longstanding structural problem for Brazilian agriculture. Calmon noted that, since the Empire, "the disposal of the harvest is difficult" and indicated that "the old projects of iron roads or cartable paths, linking the coast to the central mountains [...] are resisted by skeptical statesmen, quoting Thiers, who, in 1841, believed that railways were not convenient to France".

Crops are immediately trucked to market via highways, mostly in poor traffic conditions at high cost.

For the 2008–2009 harvest, for example, the Federation of Agriculture and Livestock of Goiás denounced poor road conditions in the Center-West region, despite repeated requests for federal assistance over several years.

In 2006 the federal government issued a National Plan of Logistics and Transportation, meant to improve production flow. Lack of investment, however, continues to be the main obstacle to distribution logistics.

=== Regulatory stocks and minimum price ===
A good example of the need of regulatory stocks is in the production of ethanol as a fuel from sugar cane. The elevated price variation during the harvest year, that varies for climatic and plant health reasons, justifies the formation of stocks. Stocks also aim to stabilize farmers' revenues, and avoid price fluctuations between harvests.

Until the 1980s, Brazil employed the Minimum Prices Policy. That policy had lost relevance by the 1990s, due to globalization.

The composition of stocks at the national level is the responsibility of the National Food Supply Company (Conab).

== Family farming ==
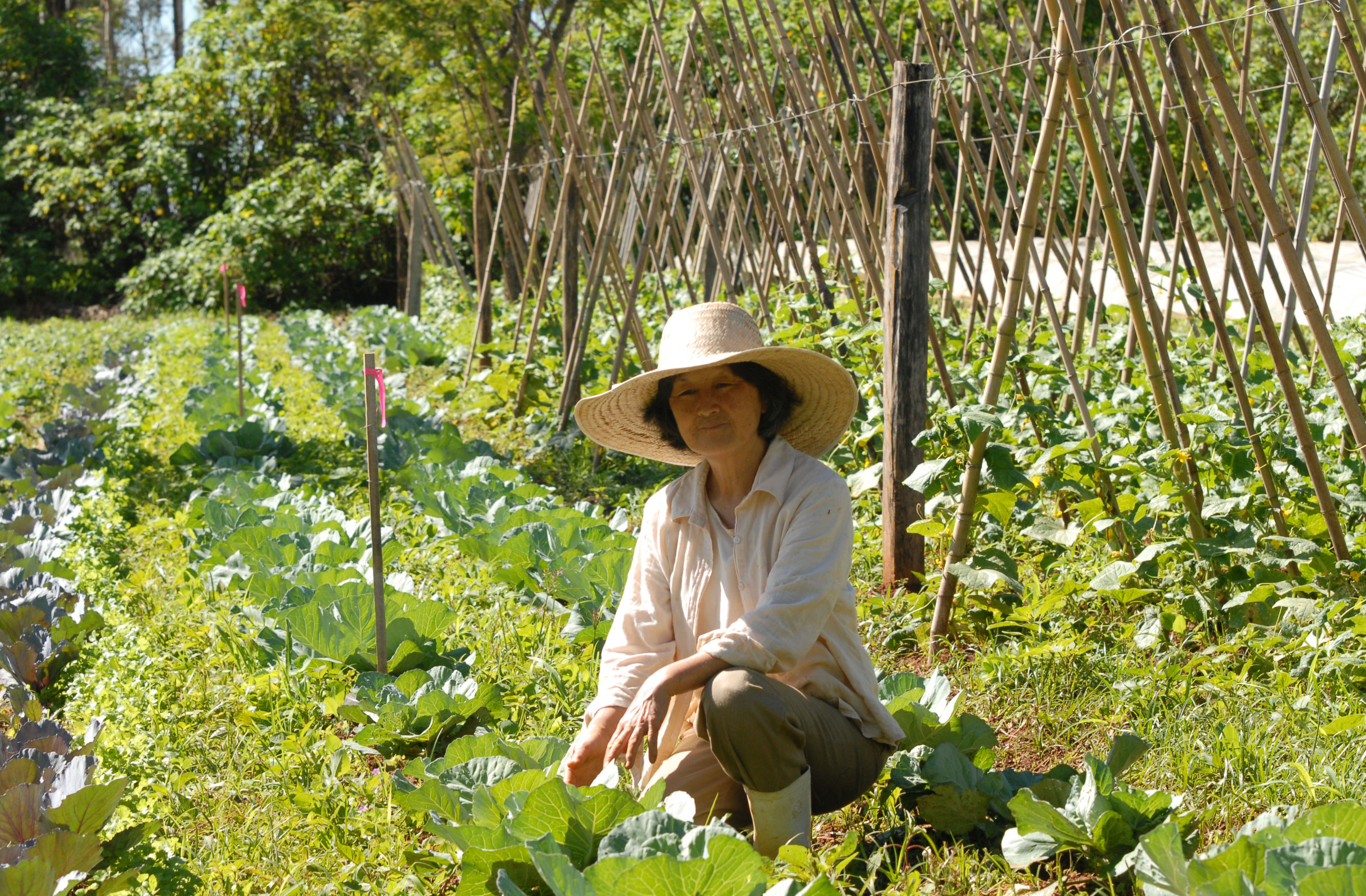
Vegetable plot on a family farm

Official definitions of a family farmer differ from country to country in Latin America. There are three general categories: subsistence farming, intermediate family farmers and consolidated farms. In Brazil, the Family Farming Law (Law 11,326) defines family farmers through four criteria related to land tenure, farm size, dependence on farm income, and the use of predominantly family labor. In Brazil, the large majority of family farms are in the northeastern, southern and southeast Brazil. Family farmers in Brazil produce 21,4% of food consumed domestically.

In 1999, the Ministry of Agrarian Development (MDA) was created to support family farmers and promote land reform and sustainable land development. A host of government policies and government-supported programs in the interest of family farmers then emerged, where the family farmer is recognized as a pillar of national development. Since then, the MDA along with other institutions were created with the family farmers and other traditional communities' interests in mind, where policies targeting family farmers were designed to introduce market incentives, promote adequate food distribution and provide technical assistance.

In general, family farms are establishments that employ mostly family members with up to five temporary workers. Family farms provide the majority of Brazilian staples, including 84% of manioc, 67% of beans and 49% of corn. Family farms also have a large role in the livestock and dairy industry, producing 58% of milk, 59% of pork, 50% of poultry and 31% of cattle.

% of total crop production by family farmers (2010 statistics, Ministry of Agrarian Development, Brazil)
| Crop | Percentage (%) produced by family farmers |
|---|---|
| Manioc | 84% |
| Beans | 67% |
| Corn | 49% |
| Rice | 34% |
| Milk | 58% |
| Cattle | 31% |
| Pork | 59% |
| Poultry | 50% |
| Wheat | 21% |
| Soybeans | 16% |

According to the IBGE's 1995–96 Farming and Livestock Census, there were 4,339,859 family-run establishments in the country, the largest farm being 100 ha in area. In 2009, Brazil's Ministry of Agrarian Development (MDA) reported that 84.4% of all rural properties are in fact family farms. In the 1990s family farms experienced productivity growth of 75%, compared to only 40% for larger-scale producers. The difference is largely due to the creation of PRONAF (National Program on Family Agriculture), which opened a special family farm credit line.

The Brazilian President Luiz Inácio Lula da Silva launched the National Biodiesel Program in 2004, with intentions to integrate family farming into biodiesel supply chains. However, by and large, despite these attempts, and others such as the Social Fuel Seal (SCS), that were designed to support smallholder inclusion, the soy lobbying is largely dominant in Brazilian politics. Small farms, and family farms still struggle to be integrated against agribusiness interest, that guides government actions.

Up to 2009 six Family Farming and Land Reform National Fairs were held, the first four in Brasília and the last two in Rio de Janeiro. They highlight the importance of family farming to Brazilian economy, accounting for 70% of the country's food consumption and 10% of Brazilian GDP.

== Food security in Brazil ==
International monitoring organizations assert that a third of Brazil's population is food insecure. Despite increased food production since the industrialization, a large proportion of Brazilians, especially the urban and rural poor, have difficulty meeting their nutrition needs. Small farmer, landless worker and indigenous movements that had consolidated during or after the military dictatorship mobilized nationwide, pressuring the authorities to prioritize food and nutrition security rose in the 1980s, and were able to strongly shape the direction of developmental policy.

The notion of access to food and proper nutrition was first recorded official terminology in 1986 as segurança alimentar (food security). The right to food and nutrition was established on 25 August 2010, when Brazil adopted the Policy on Food Security and Nutrition (Decree 7.272). Food security refers to being able to meet dietary needs through an adequate, secure supply of nutritious food. The term rose into Brazilian popular consciousness in 1993 after campaigns by a national movement called Citizens' Action Against Hunger and Poverty and for Life. In that same period, Consea (National Food and Nutritional Security Council) was established. the 1st National Conference on Food Security was organized by a combination of policy and grassroots mobilizations. Consea ran from 1993 to 1994, with little success in shaping public policies, was halted until after the establishment of the Fome Zero Program. The 2010 Policy names Consea as an instrument in proposing programs that promote food security on a federal level.

The following is an excerpt from Food Security

In 2023, approximately 27.6% of Brazilian households, equating to 21.6 million homes, experienced some level of food insecurity. This included 18.2% facing mild food insecurity, 5.3% moderate, and 4.1% severe.

On an individual level, remarkably severe food insecurity saw a significant decline, dropping from 8% of the population in 2022 to 1.2% in 2023 according to the Brazilian government. This reduction lifted 14.7 million people out of severe hunger conditions.

=== PRONAF (National Program for the Strengthening of Family Farming) ===
Due to financial limitations, small farmers generally have difficulties securing the capital necessary to stay in rural areas and maintain production on a small scale. PRONAF was the first policy in 1994 to be created to meet the specific credit needs of family farmers. In order to stimulate agricultural production, the instrument provides incentives in the form of reduced-interest loans from national funds for rural development, targeting low-income farmers and agrarian reform farmers. Set against a backdrop of policies opening Brazil to Neoliberal economic forces and intense competition through Mercosul, PRONAF marked the institutionalization of a differentiated policy approach to family farming in Brazil. The economic and social importance of family farmers and their specific needs were recognized through PRONAF, at least on paper. The creation of PRONAF has been credited to favorable political circumstances, beginning with Brazil's re-democratization in the 1980s and a receptive Cardoso administration to the mobilizations of a number of agrarian civil groups. Loans written out to family farmers through PRONAF rose from US$1 billion in 2000 to an estimated US$5.8 billion in 2008. Other credit programs targeted at family farmers that came after PRONAF include PROGER and PROCERA.

== Gathering ==
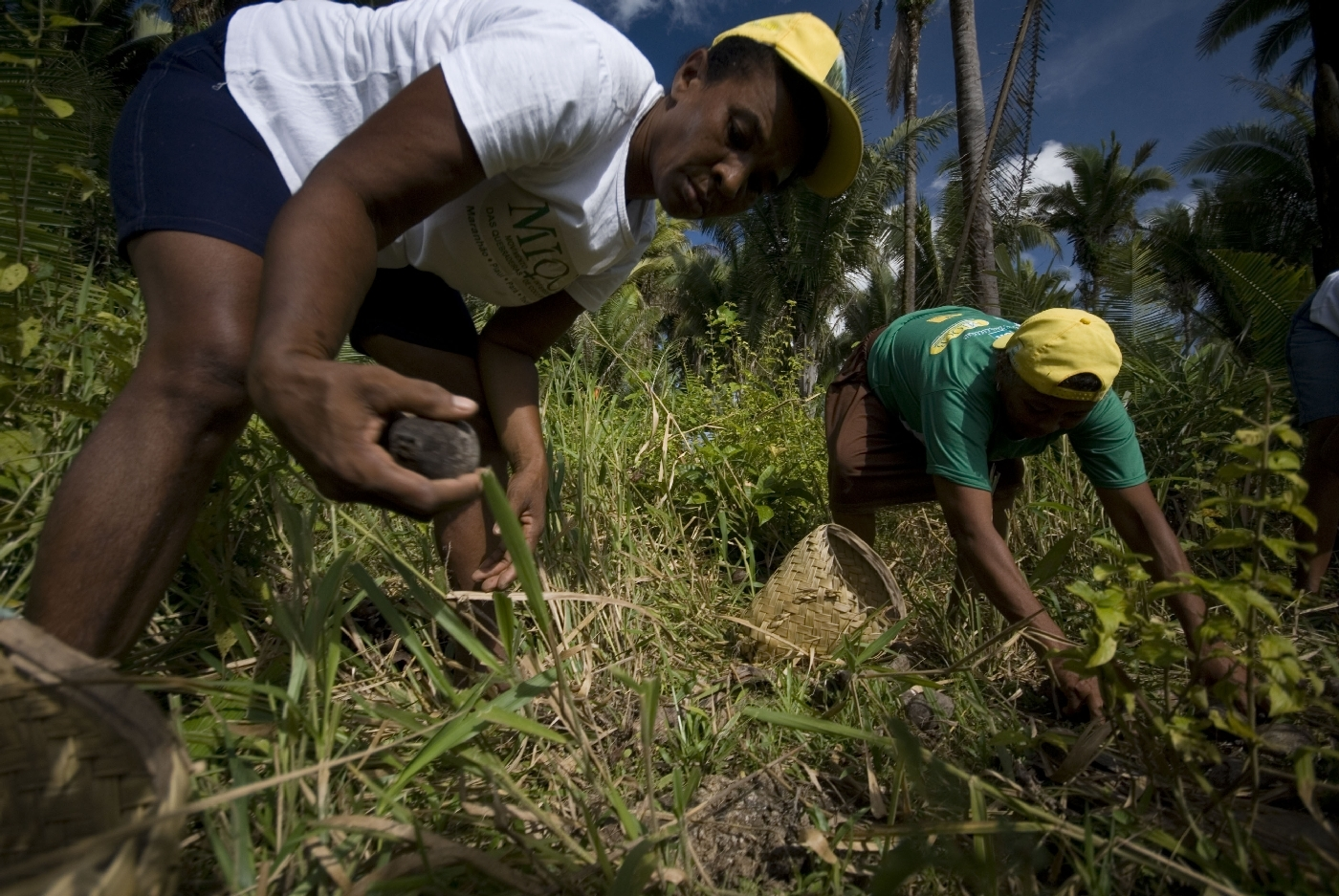
People gathering babassu in Maranhão

The country's colonization began with harvesting native plants where they grew. Cultivation followed much later. The exploitation of brazilwood, known to the natives as ibirapitanga, and which ended up naming the land was begun by the Portuguese.

Brazil operates forty-nine gathering reservations and sixty-five forests protected by federal law. The gathering of plant resources is encouraged as a means of interacting with, but not degrading, the environment.

Lack of government funding has destabilized this use of forest resources. The case of natural rubber is typical: in Acre about 4,000 families have apparently abandoned the activity, as revealed in early 2009. After undergoing acclimatization, rubber trees were grown successfully in São Paulo state, where more than 36,000 hectares were planted – while Acre accounts for little more than a thousand hectares.

Homma claims that gathering rubber is economically impracticable. For example, in native forests, rubber trees are found at a density of some 1.5 trees per ha, versus hundreds of trees per ha on rubber plantations. Cultivating degraded areas with native trees has been successful with trees such as cupuaçu and jaborandi.

According to IBGE, in 2003 the gathering sector's output was divided into timber (65%) and non-wood (35%), at a value of four hundred forty-nine million Reals, with the following main products: piassaba (27%), babassu (nut – 17%), açai (16%), yerba mate (14%), carnauba (8%) and Brazil nut (5%).

== Soils ==
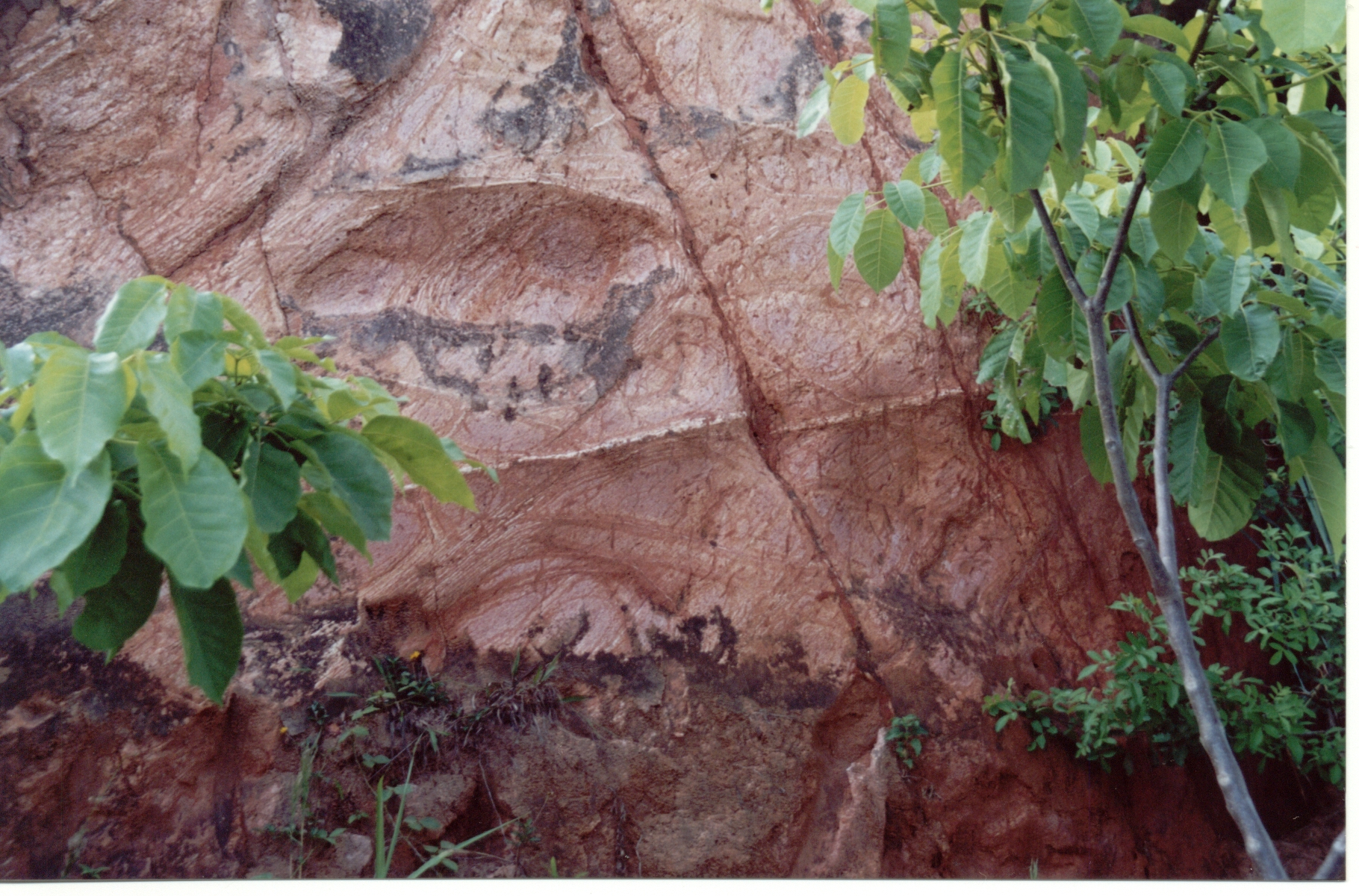
Regolithic soil, in granulite

The program of mapping and classifying the country's soils began in 1953, with the Chart of Soils in Brazil. IBGE published the first map in 2003. Soil knowledge helped allow the expansion of agricultural production from 1975. The expansion of the Center-West required new technology because the region is mainly formed by oxisols, which favor mechanization from soil preparation to harvest, partly because they are nutrient-poor.

Soil classification, study and systematization are championed by Embrapa Soils, with participation from groups such as the RADAM Project, the Rural University (now UFRRJ) and other agronomists.

== Agribusiness ==
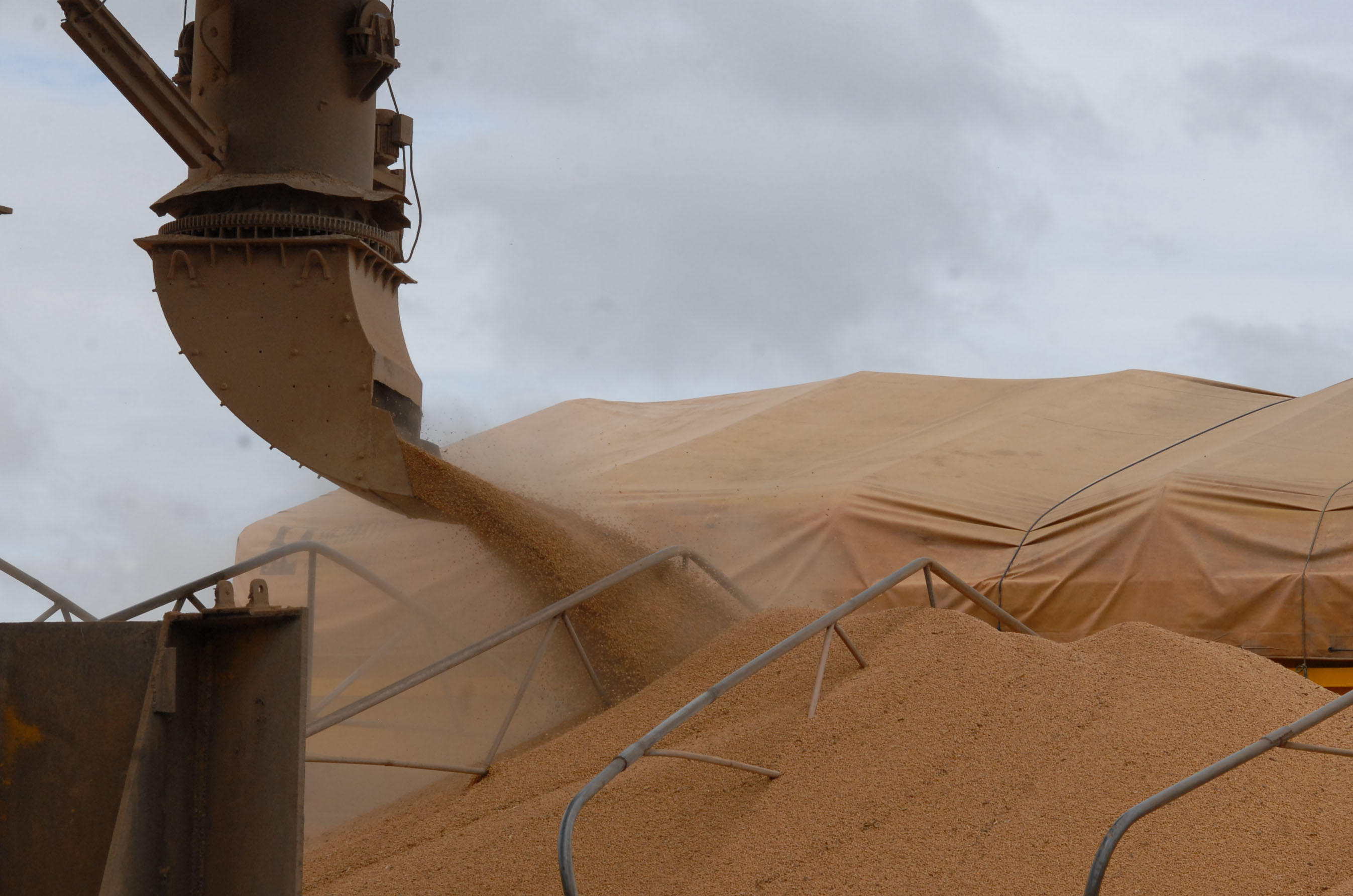
Machinery in soybean production

In 2010 Brazil was the third largest exporter of agricultural products in the world, behind only the United States and the European Union.

During the last two decades of the 20th century, Brazil witnessed a doubling of yield per acre. This resulted from input improvements (seeds, fertilizers, machinery), public policies that encouraged exports, reduced tax burden (such as the 1996 reduction of the circulation tax), more favorable real exchange rate, which had allowed price stability (in 1999), increased Asian demand, productivity growth and reduced trade barriers.

Farming accounted for almost a third of GDP, once everything from agricultural inputs to food processing and distribution are included.

From 1990 to 2001, farming employment fell, although overall agribusiness employment jumped from 372 thousand to 1.82 million. The number of companies grew from 18 thousand in 1994 to almost 47 thousand in 2001.

Factors that limit further expansion range from pests evolving to target monocultures, infrastructure issues, etc.

=== Trade balance ===
The 2007 harvest enabled gross agriculture exports yielding 68.1 billion dollars, and net exports of 57.3 billion dollars.

In 2008 Brazil's biggest export market was the European Union, while China was the largest single importing country with a 13.2% share, followed by the Netherlands with 9.5% and the US at 8.7%.

=== Regions ===
Brazil's regions offer a wide diversity of climate. Agriculture reflects this diversity. In 1995, the North produced 4.2%, the Northeast – 13.6%, the Center-West – 10.4%, the Southeast – 41.8% and the South – 30.0%. The Center-West and North regions have recently expanded their share to the total.

==== South ====
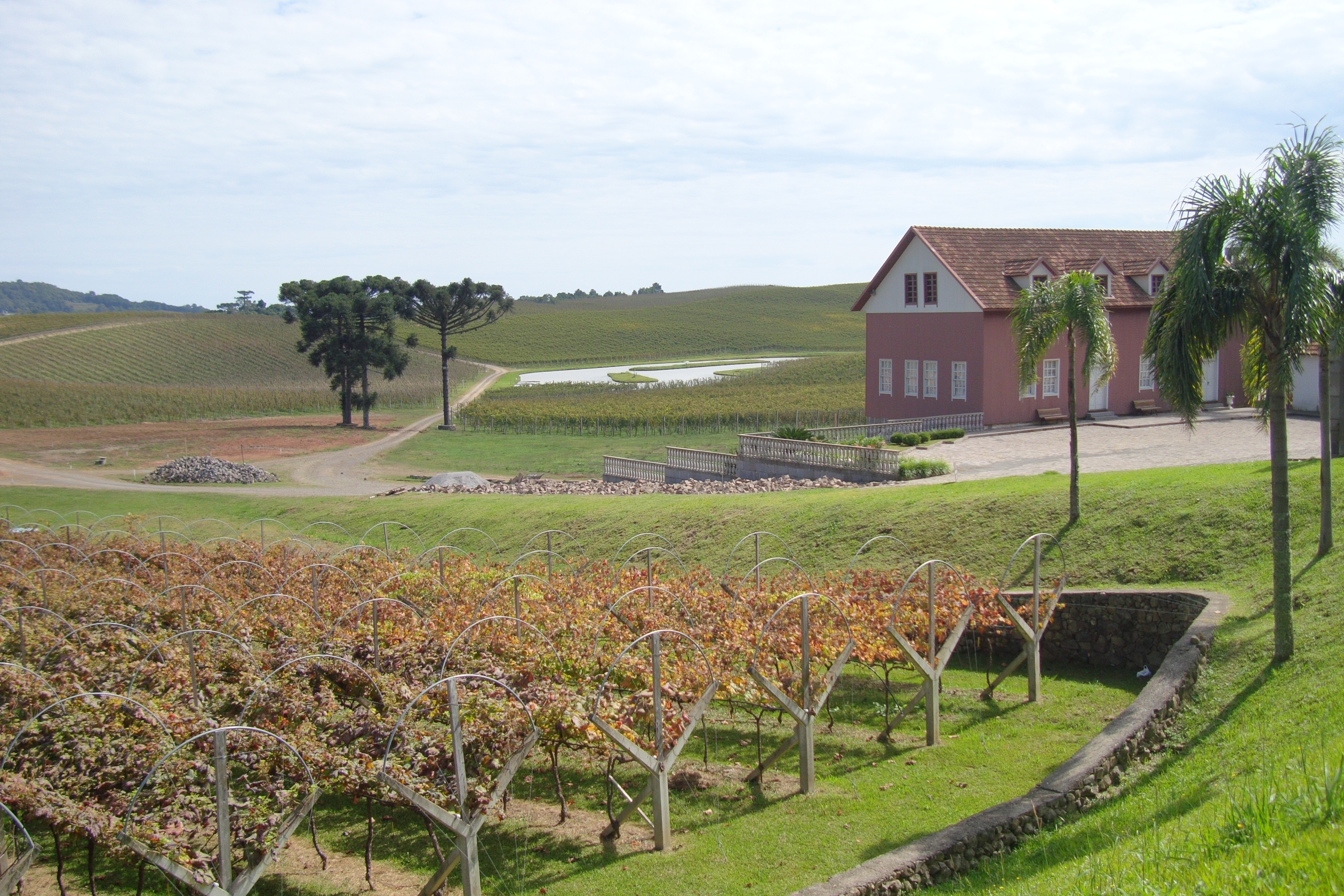
Vineyard in Rio Grande do Sul

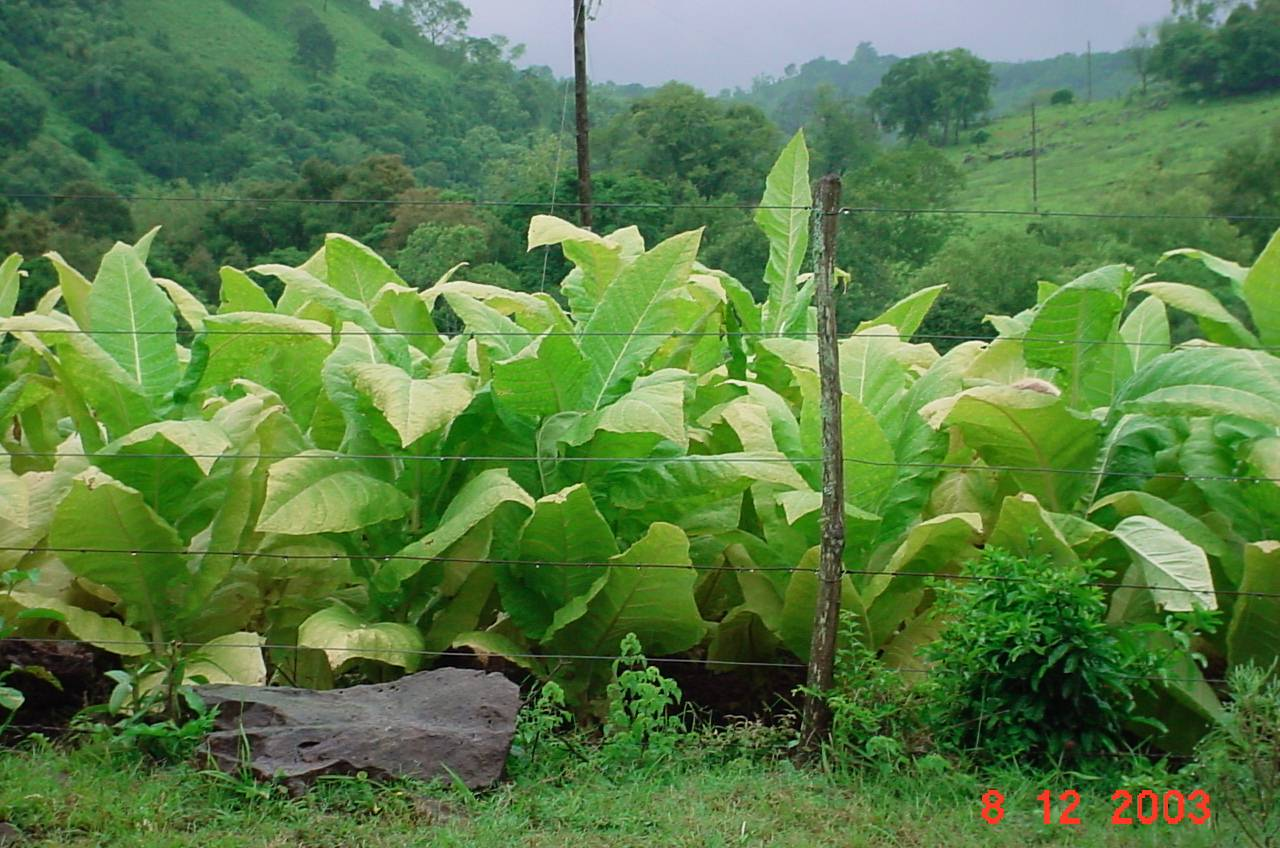
Tobacco in Rio Grande do Sul

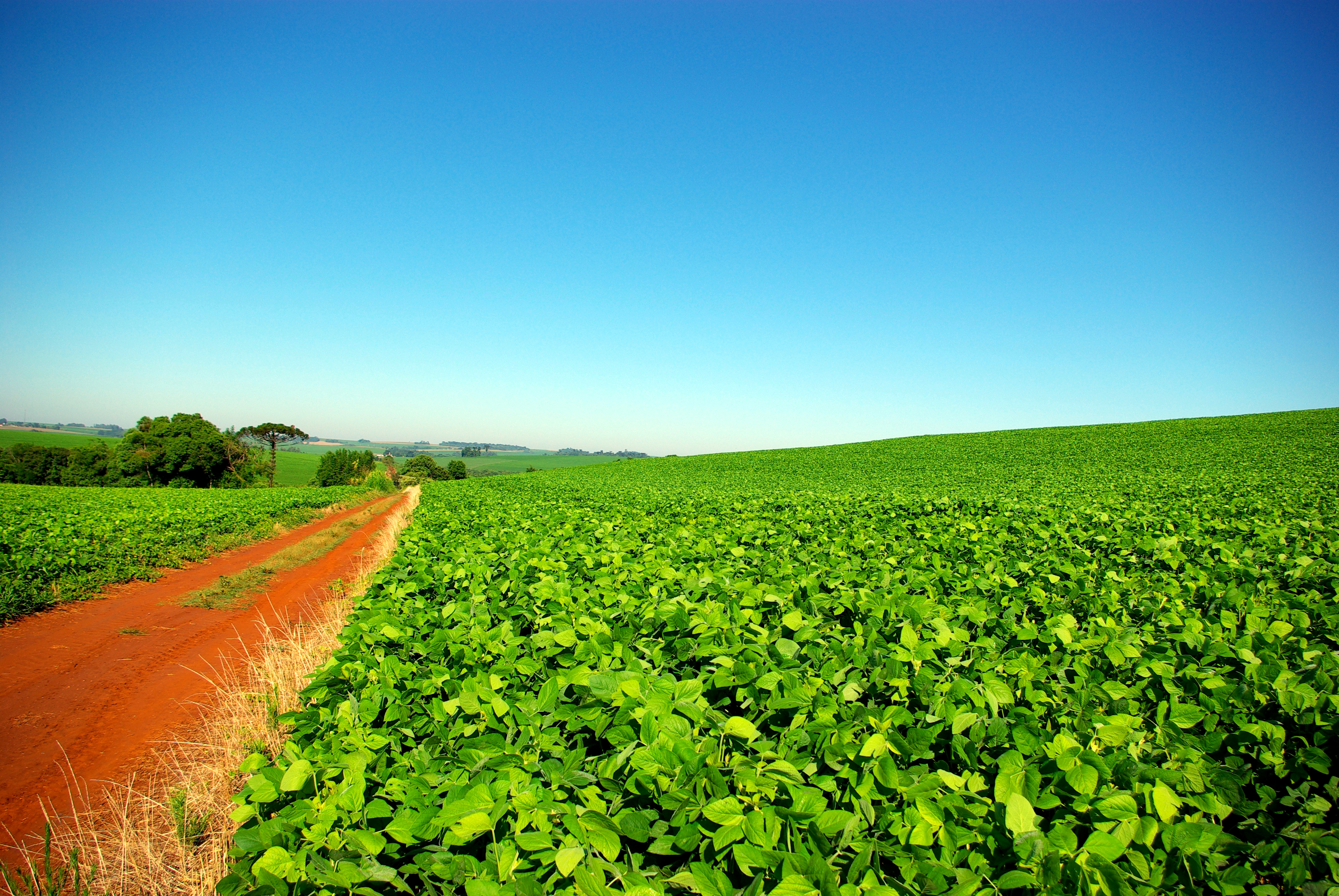
Soy plantation in Rio Grande do Sul

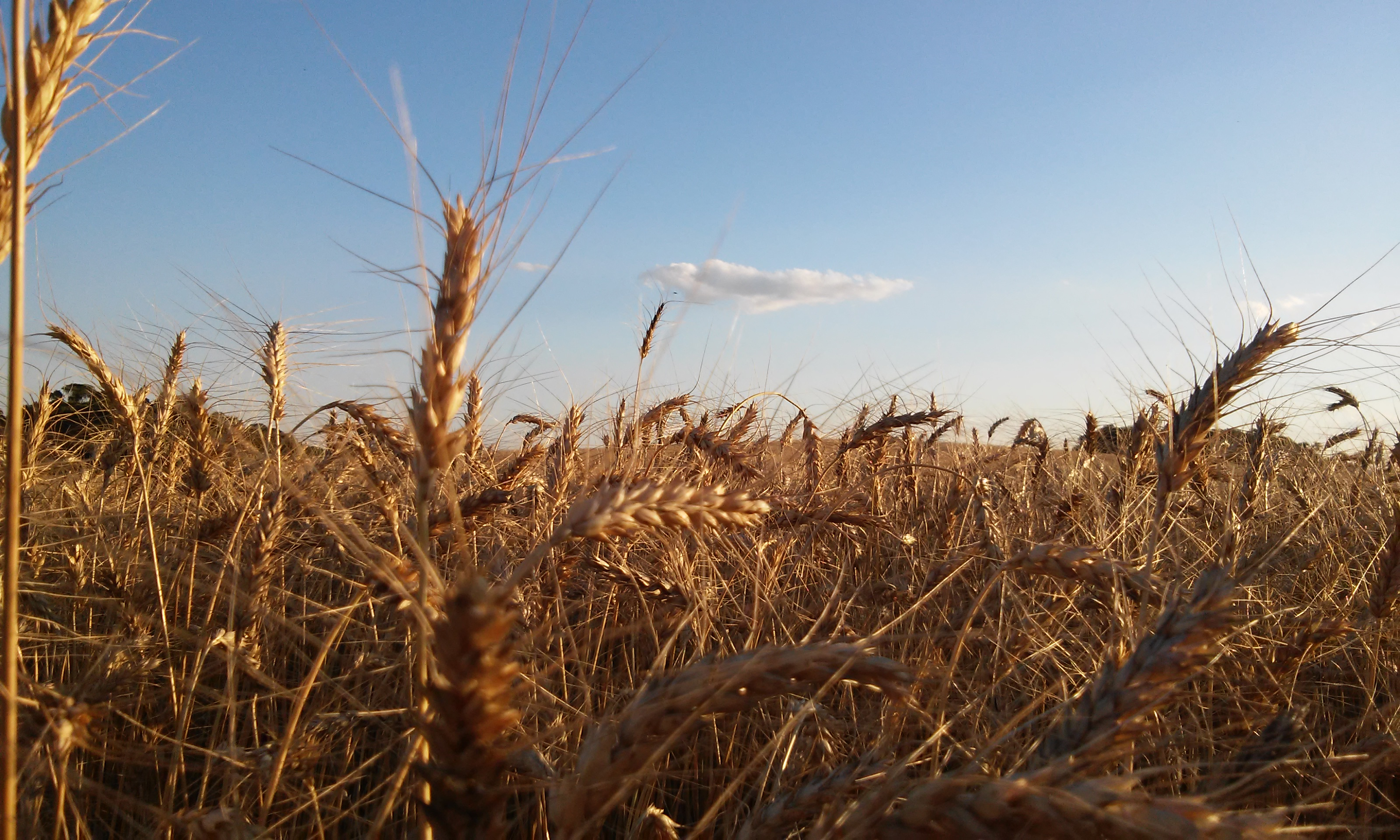
Wheat plantation in Paraná

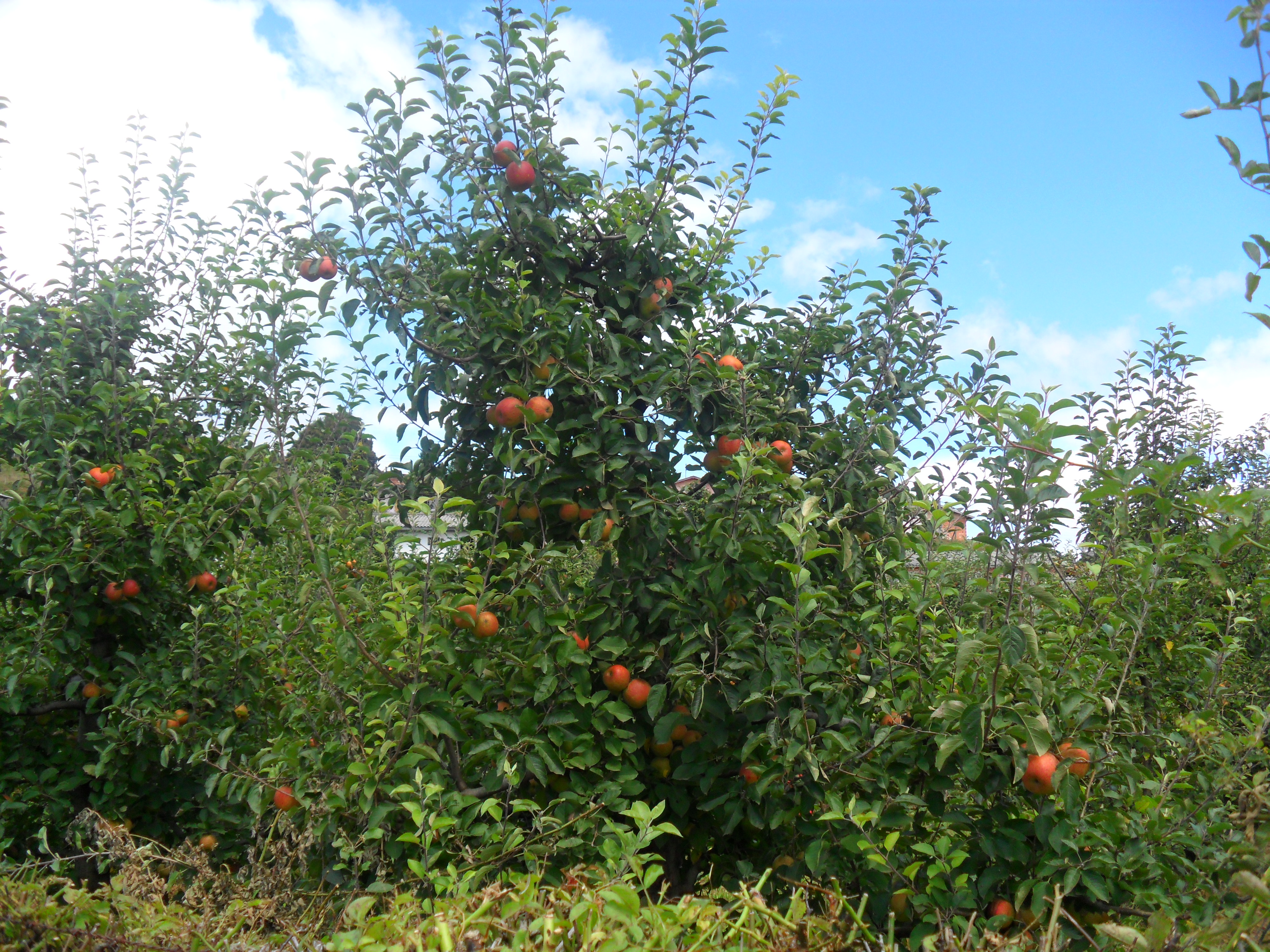
Apple trees in Santa Catarina

The southern Brazilian states are Rio Grande do Sul, Santa Catarina and Paraná. Cooperatives are a common feature of agriculture there. Soy, corn, wheat, rice, tobacco, grape, apple, sugar cane, cassava and beans are the highlights of the region. It also has relevant productions of orange, oat, barley, peach, fig, onion, garlic, tangerine, persimmon and strawberry. The region is Brazil's largest tobacco producer and the world's largest exporter.

In 2020, the South produced 32% of the national total of cereals, vegetables and oilseeds. There were 77.2 million tons, second place in Brazil, losing only to the Midwest. Paraná (14.9%) and Rio Grande do Sul (14.3%) are the 2nd and 3rd largest producers in the country.

Rio Grande do Sul is the largest producer of rice in the country, with 70.5% of Brazil's production, close to 7.3 million tons in 2020. Santa Catarina was the second largest national producer, with around 1.1 million tons of the product.

Rio Grande do Sul is the largest producer of tobacco in Brazil, and is the largest exporter in the world. Brazil is the second largest producer in the world and leader in tobacco exports since the 1990s, with 98% of Brazilian production being carried out in the South Region.

The western region of Paraná is today the main pole for transforming grains into animal protein in the country.

In soy, Paraná and Rio Grande do Sul are among the largest producers in the country, with about 16% of national production for each one, second only to Mato Grosso, which has 27% of production. Paraná produced 19.8 million tons in 2020, and Rio Grande do Sul produced 19.3 million tons. In 2019, Santa Catarina harvested 2.3 million tons.

Regarding sugarcane, Paraná was, in 2017, the fifth largest producer of cane, third of sugar and fifth of alcohol in the country. It harvested about 46 million tons of cane this year. The state's sugar and alcohol sector has 25 plants and employs around 55,000 people. The regions of Umuarama, Paranavaí, Maringá and Jacarezinho concentrate production. Brazil is the largest world producer, with 672.8 million tons harvested in 2018.

In cassava production, Brazil produced a total of 17.6 million tons in 2018. Paraná was the 2nd largest producer in the country, with 3.2 million tons. Rio Grande do Sul was 4th, with almost 1 million tons. Santa Catarina produced 351 thousand tons.

About orange, Paraná was the 3rd largest producer in Brazil in 2018, with a total of 834 thousand tons. Rio Grande do Sul was 5th, with 367 thousand tons. Santa Catarina had a small production.

The South Region is the largest producer of barley in Brazil. In the 1990s, the state of Rio Grande do Sul was the largest producer (66.8% of the country's total production), however, in the following decade Paraná started to occupy this position (49.8% of production). In the 2007–2011 period, 55.0% of the cultivation area was concentrated in Paraná (62.6% of production), 42.4% in Rio Grande do Sul (34.9% of production) and 2.6% in Santa Catarina (2.5% of production). The state of Paraná harvested 219.2 thousand tons in 2019, 60% of the national production. In addition to the cooler climate required by barley, the advantage of producers in Paraná is the proximity to the largest malting plant in Latin America, as the barley is grown on a commercial scale exclusively for use in the manufacture of malt, the main raw material of the beer industry. However, Brazil is far from being self-sufficient in the production of barley. The Brazilian market consumes, on average, 1.5 million tons per year. Brazil produces 335 thousand tons, close to 22%. Most, 73%, come from Argentina and Uruguay.

Rio Grande do Sul is also the largest national producer of wheat, another crop that requires cold climates, with 2.3 million tons in 2019. Paraná is the 2nd largest producer, with a production almost identical to Rio Grande do Sul. In 2019, the 2 states harvested together about 85% of Brazil's harvest, but even so, the country is one of the largest global importers of cereal, having imported about 7 million tons this year, to meet a consumption of 12 million tons. Most of the wheat that Brazil imports comes from Argentina.

The South Region is also the largest producer of oats in Brazil. In 2019, national production was close to 800 thousand tons, being almost all carried out in the South (Paraná and Rio Grande do Sul), with a small production in Mato Grosso do Sul.

In 2017, Paraná was the country's second largest producer of corn with 41.5 million tons; third, Rio Grande do Sul, with 35.3 million. In 2019, corn production in Santa Catarina reached 2.8 million tons.

Since 2006, Paraná has been leading the production of beans in Brazil. Brazil is the 3rd largest producer of beans in the world, with an annual harvest of around 3 million tons, 11% of world production. In 2018, the South Region was the main bean producer with 26.4% of the total, followed by the Midwest (25.4%), Southeast Region (25.1%), Northeast (20.6%) and North (2.5%). The State of Paraná leads the ranking of the main national producers with 18.9% of the total produced.

Rio Grande do Sul is responsible for 90% of the national production of grapes, and produces 90% of the wine produced in the country, 85% of the sparkling wine, and 90% of the grape juice, mainly in the area of Caxias do Sul and surroundings. Santa Catarina had an annual production of around 23 thousand tons of grape in 2019, with 86% of the state production located in the municipalities of Caçador, Pinheiro Preto, Tangará and Videira. Most of the national production, however, is located in Rio Grande do Sul (664.2 thousand tons in 2018).

The three Southern States of the country are responsible for 95% of the national production of apple, and Santa Catarina appears at the top of the production list, disputing with Rio Grande do Sul. The region of São Joaquim is responsible for 35% of the national apple plantation. Rio Grande do Sul harvests 45% of Brazilian apples, and is the largest exporter of apples in the country. The region in the vicinity of Vacaria is the highlight: it accounts for 88% of the state's production and 37% of the national production.

Rio Grande do Sul is the largest producer of peaches in Brazil, with half the volume harvested in Brazil in 2018. The rest of the Brazilian production takes place in Santa Catarina, Paraná, São Paulo and Minas Gerais.

Rio Grande do Sul is also the largest producer of fig in the country, according to data from 2018.

Santa Catarina is a national leader in the production of onions. In 2017, it produced 630 thousand tons, especially in the municipalities of Alfredo Wagner, Angelina and Rancho Queimado. It was also the third largest producer of garlic in Brazil in 2018, with a planted area of approximately two thousand hectares. The Curitibanos region is the largest producer in the state.

In coffee, Paraná is the producer state located further south in the country. It was once the largest producing state in Brazil: in 1962, Paraná accounted for 58% of national production, but in 2017, it had only 2.7% of the total produced in the country. The coffee culture has been replaced by other planting crops, and the state's focus today has been to invest in special, more expensive coffee beans.

In 2018, Rio Grande do Sul and Paraná were the 3rd and 4th largest producers of tangerine in Brazil. Rio Grande do Sul is also responsible for 19% of Brazil's persimmon production, being the 2nd largest national producer.

In 2019, in Brazil, there was a total production area of around 4 thousand hectares of strawberry. Rio Grande do Sul and Paraná were the 3rd and 4th largest producers in the country, with an area of approximately 500 ha planted.

==== Southeast ====
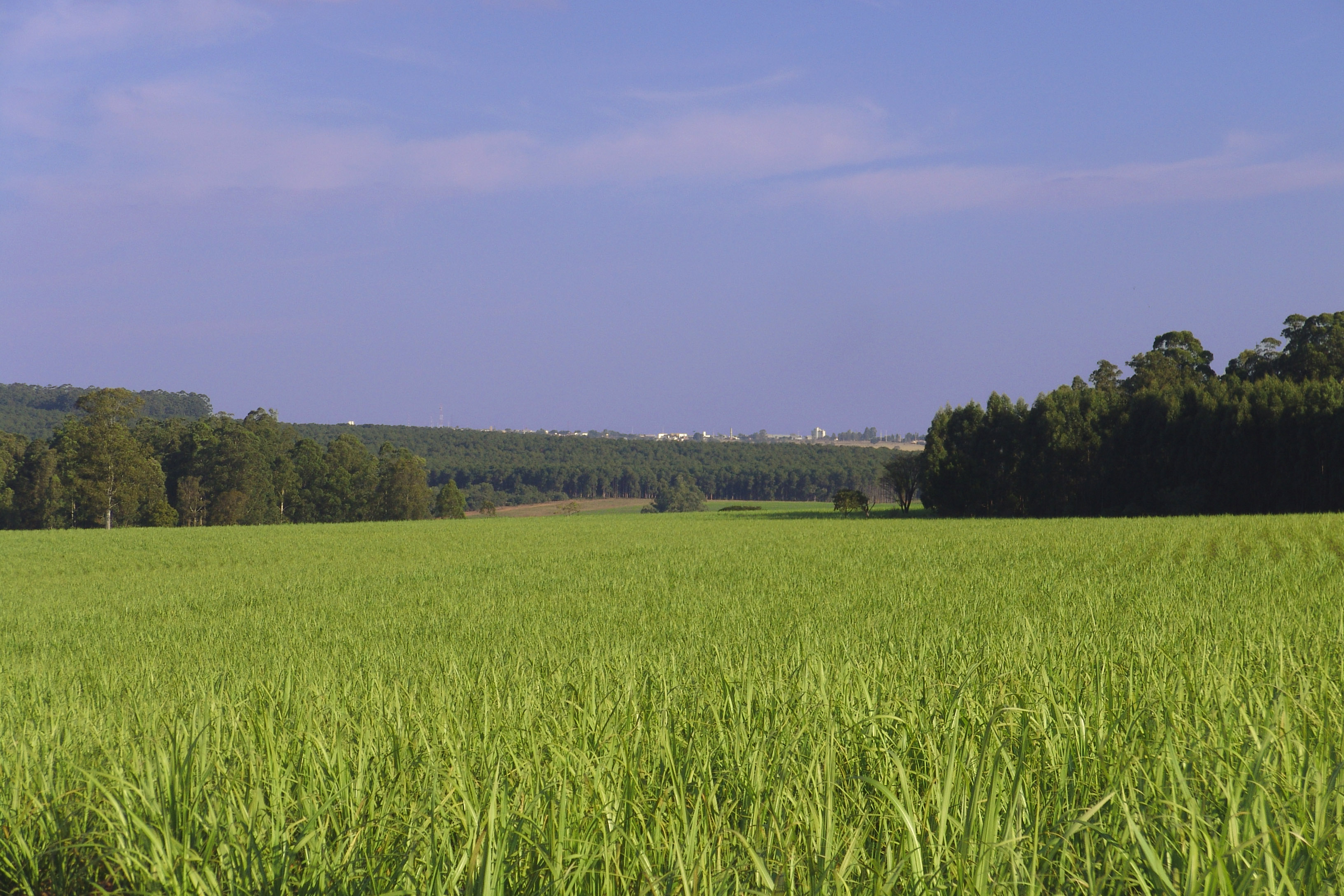
Cane plantation in Avare, São Paulo

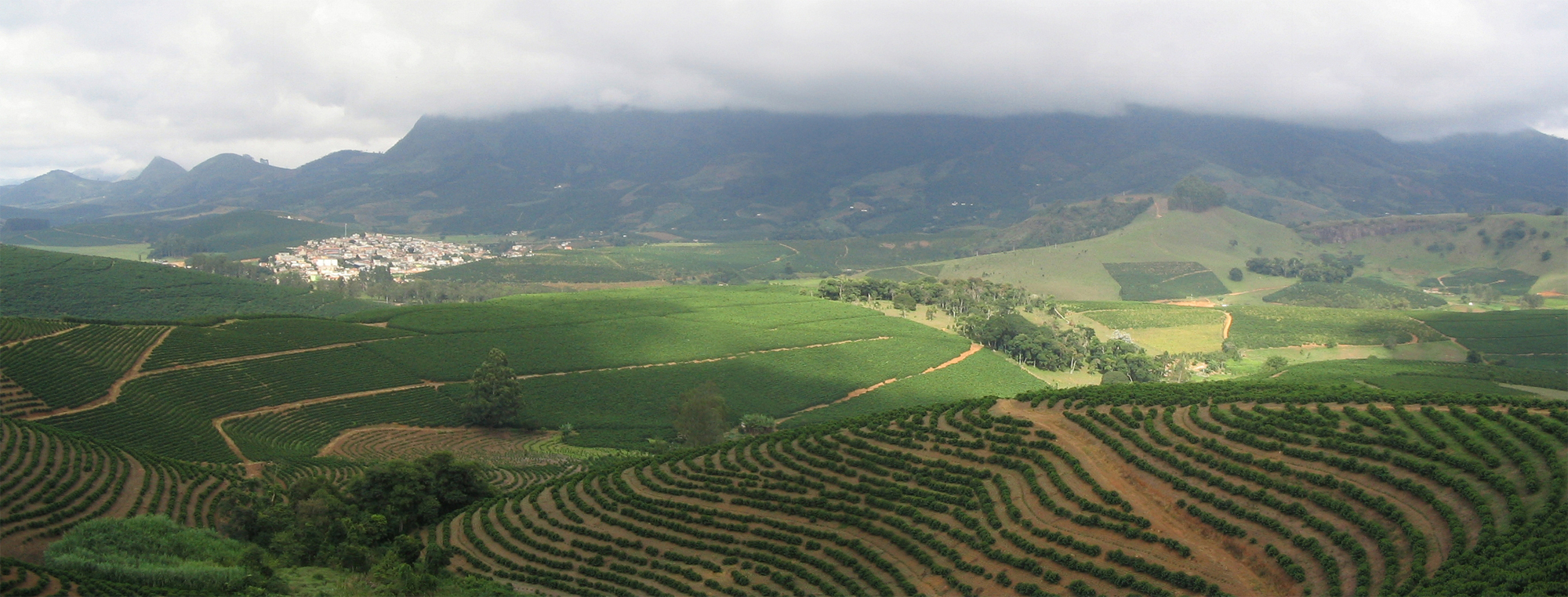
Coffee in São João do Manhuaçu, Minas Gerais

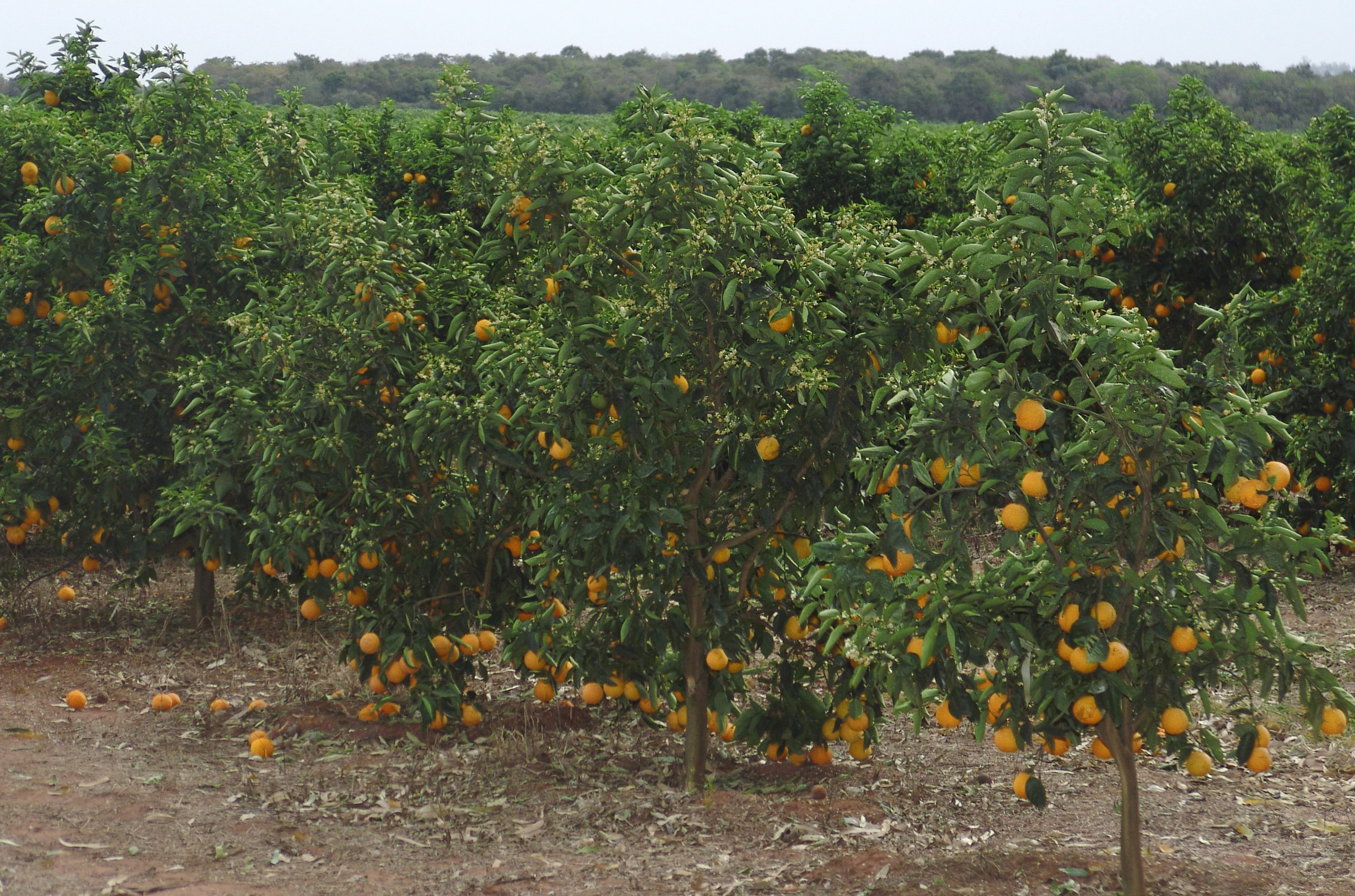
Orange in Avaré, São Paulo

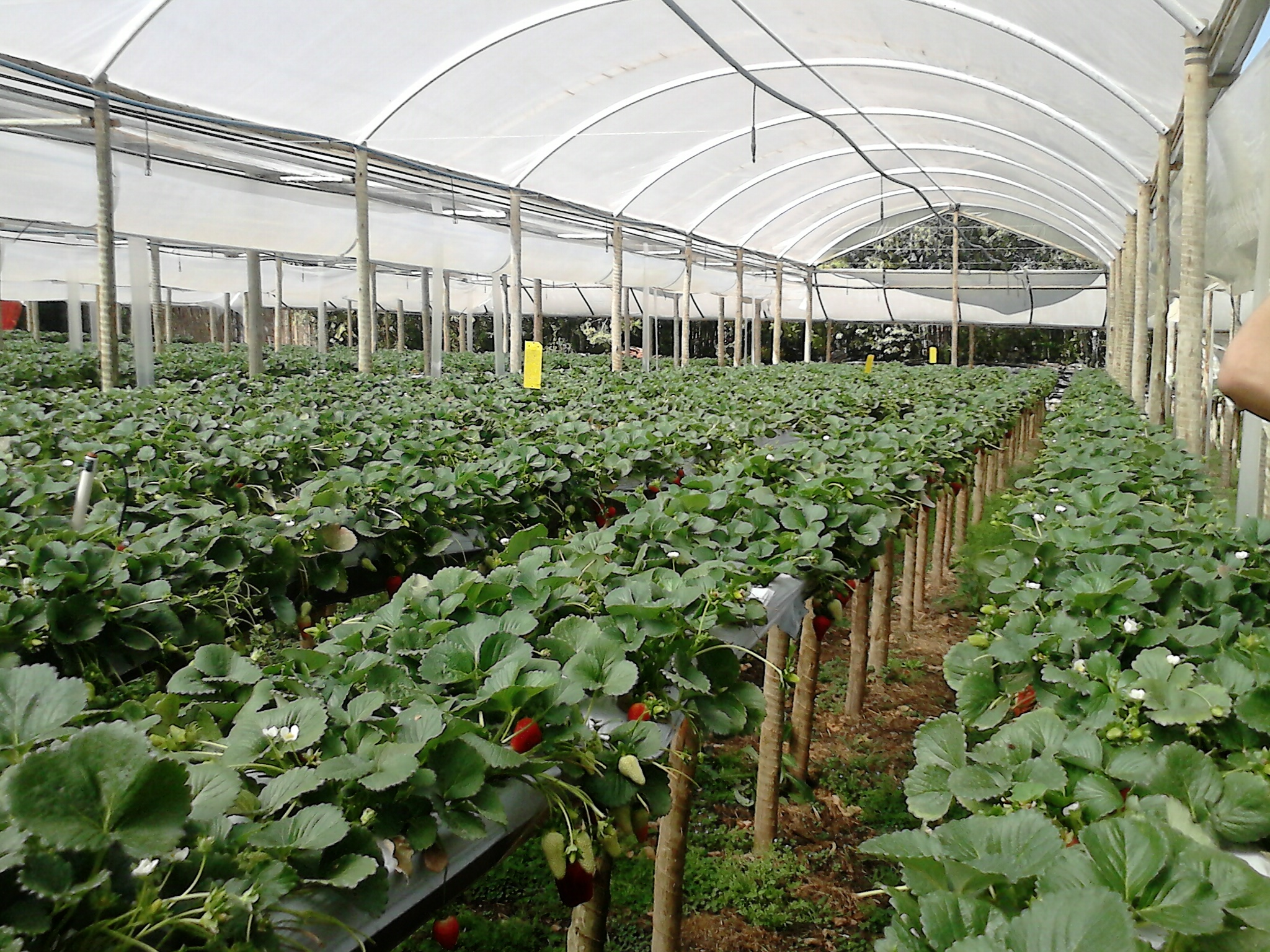
Strawberry in Estiva, Minas Gerais

The Southeast region includes Minas Gerais, São Paulo, Rio de Janeiro and Espírito Santo. It's responsible for the largest share of Brazilian agriculture, but other regions are growing rapidly. It's a giant producer of coffee, sugar cane and orange, and also has large productions of soy, beans, peanut, sorghum, carrot, potato, banana, tangerine, lemon, papaya, persimmon, strawberry and cassava.

In 2004 the Southeast produced 49.8% of the nation's fruit. The region hosts 60% of agribusiness software companies, according to a survey carried out by Embrapa Livestock and Farming Information Technology (located in Campinas/SP). Its agribusiness sector was second in the national ranking, in the period from 2000 to May 2008, representing 36% of 308 billion dollars of total exports. The biggest exports were sugar (17.27%), coffee (16.25%), paper and cellulose (14.89%), meats (11.71%) and horticultural and fruit (especially orange juice) with 10.27%.

In 2020, Minas Gerais was the largest producer of Coffea arabica in the country, with 74% of the national total (1.9 million tons, or 31.2 million 60 kg bags). Espírito Santo was the largest producer of Coffea canephora, with a 66.3% share of the total (564.5 thousand tons, or 9.4 million 60 kg bags). In 2017, Minas accounted for 54.3% of the total national coffee production (1st place), Espírito Santo accounted for 19.7% (second place) and São Paulo, 9.8% (third place).

The Southeast is responsible for most of the sugarcane production in the country. In 2020, São Paulo remained the largest national producer, with 341.8 million tons, responsible for 51.2% of production. Minas Gerais was the third largest sugarcane producer, accounting for 11.1% of the total produced in the country, with 74.3 million tons. The area around Campos dos Goytacazes, in Rio de Janeiro, has been suffering from the decay of this activity: in the beginning of the 20th century, Campos had 27 plants in operation, and throughout the century, it was one of the largest producers in Brazil, however, in 2020, only two sugar mills operated in the city. The state, which harvested about 10 million tons in the 1980s, harvested 1.8 million tons in the 2019–20. Espírito Santo harvested almost 3 million tons in the same year.

About orange, São Paulo is the main producer in the country and responsible for 77.5% of the national total. In 2020, production was estimated at 13.7 million tons, or 334.6 million boxes of 40.8 kg. Most of it is destined to the industrialization and export of juice. Minas Gerais was the 2nd bigger producer in 2018, with a total of 948 thousand tons.

The cultivation of soy, on the other hand, is increasing, however, it's not among the largest national producers of this grain. In the 2018–2019 harvest, Minas Gerais harvested 5 million tons (7th place in the country), and São Paulo, 3 million.

Minas Gerais is the 2nd largest producer of beans in Brazil, with 17.2% of national production in 2020. In addition, it's one of the largest national producers of sorghum: about 30% of the Brazilian cereal production. It's also in 3rd place in the national production of cotton.

The state of São Paulo accounts for more than 90% of the national production of peanuts, with Brazil exporting about 30% of the peanuts it produces.

São Paulo is also the largest national producer of banana, with Minas Gerais in 3rd place and Espírito Santo in 7th place. Brazil was already the 2nd largest producer of the fruit in the world, currently in 3rd place, losing only to India and Ecuador.

In cassava production, Brazil produced a total of 17.6 million tons in 2018. São Paulo was the 3rd largest producer in the country, with 1.1 million tons. Minas Gerais was 12th, with almost 500 thousand tons. Rio de Janeiro and Espírito Santo had a small production.

In 2018, São Paulo and Minas Gerais were the largest producers of tangerine in Brazil. Espírito Santo was the largest producer of papaya. About persimmon, São Paulo is the largest producer in the country with 58%, Minas is in 3rd place with 8%, and Rio de Janeiro in 4th place with 6%.

In 2019, in Brazil, there was a total production area of around 4 thousand hectares of strawberry. The largest producer is Minas Gerais, with approximately 1,500 hectares, cultivated in most municipalities in the extreme south of the state, in the Serra da Mantiqueira region, with Pouso Alegre and Estiva being the largest producers. São Paulo was in 2nd place with 800 hectares, with production concentrated in the municipalities of Piedade, Campinas, Jundiaí, Atibaia and nearby municipalities.

The Southeast is the largest producer of lemon in the country, with 86% of the total obtained in 2018. Only the state of São Paulo produces 79% of the total.

Regarding carrot, Brazil occupied the fifth place in the world ranking in 2016, with an annual production close to 760 thousand tons. In relation to exports of this product, Brazil occupies the seventh world position. Minas Gerais and São Paulo are the 2 largest producers in Brazil. Among the production hubs in Minas Gerais are the municipalities of São Gotardo, Santa Juliana and Carandaí. In São Paulo, the producing municipalities are Piedade, Ibiúna and Mogi das Cruzes. As for potato, the main national producer is the state of Minas Gerais, with 32% of the total produced in the country. In 2017, Minas Gerais harvested around 1.3 million tons of the product. São Paulo holds 24% of production.

==== Midwest ====
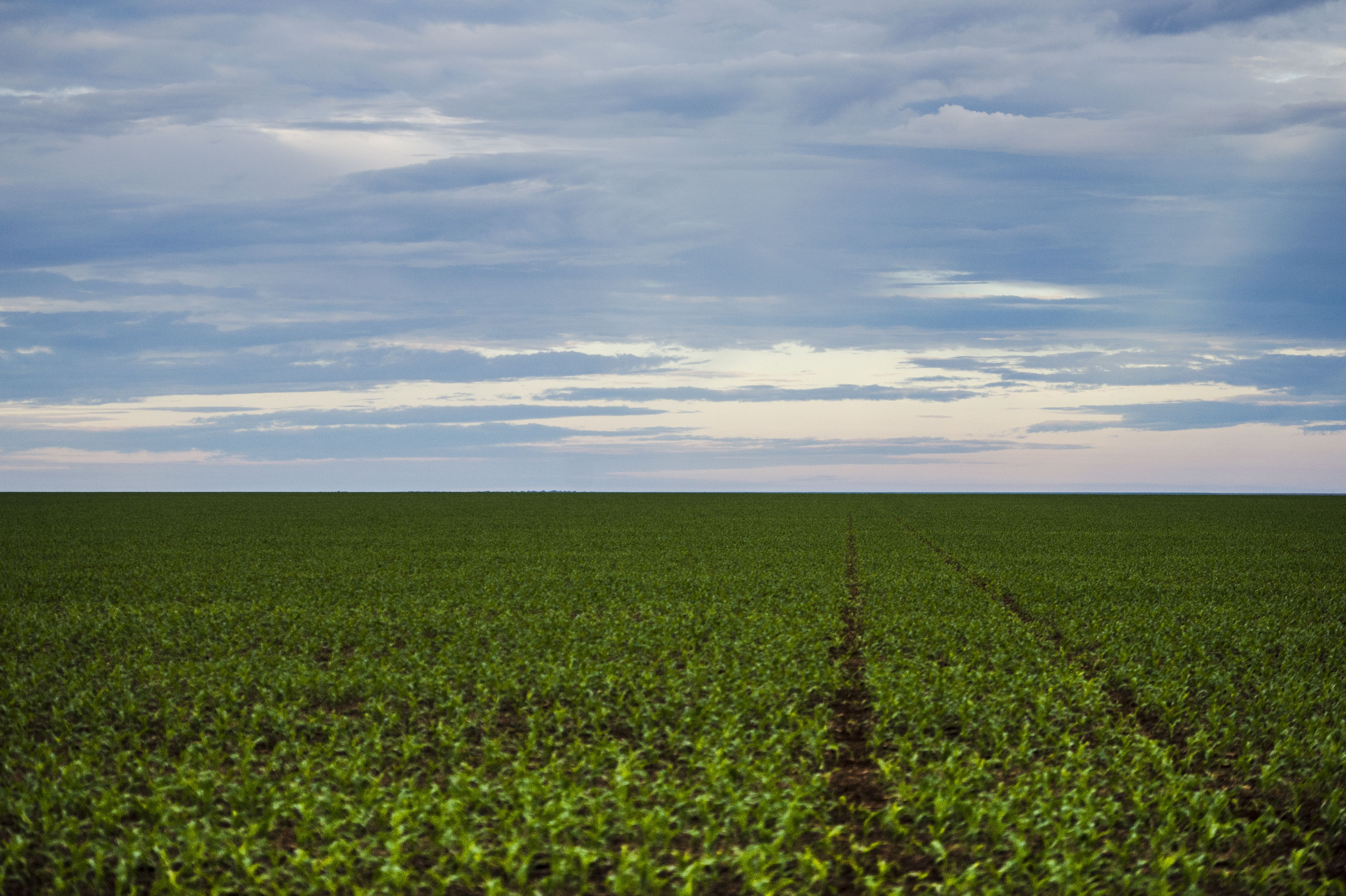
Soy plantation in Mato Grosso

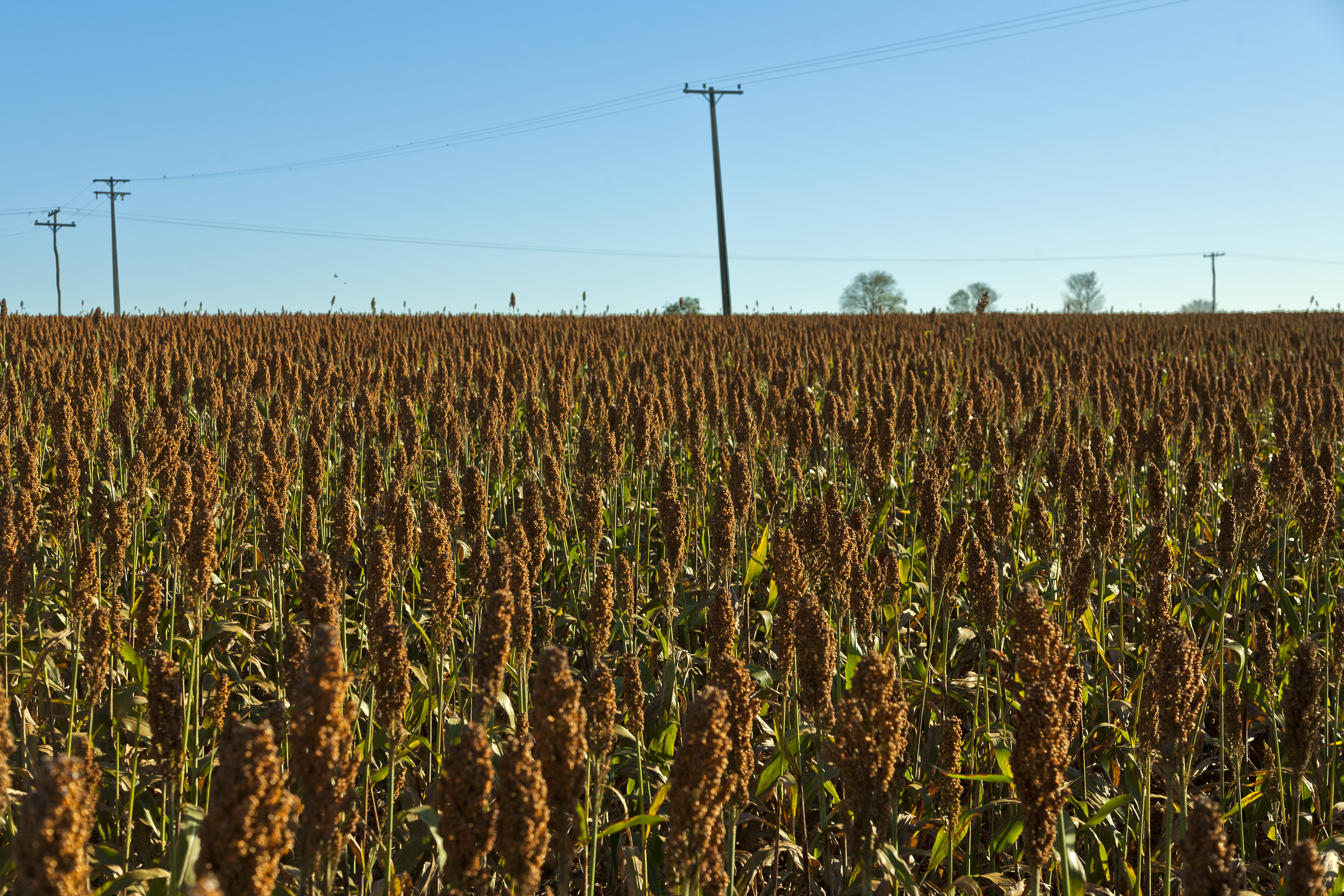
Sorghum plantation in Goiás

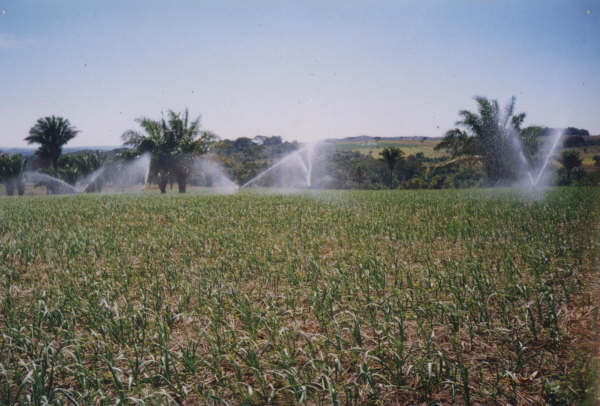
Irrigated garlic

The Midwest region includes Mato Grosso, Mato Grosso do Sul, Goiás and Distrito Federal. This region's agriculture developed much later than the rest of the country, but it's the region that most grows in productivity. The region is one of the largest producers in the world of soybeans, corn and sugar cane, in addition to a large production of tomato, beans, cotton and sorghum, also producing cassava.

Over three decades its harvest grew from 4.2 million to 49.3 million tons in 2008. Its cultivated area in 2008 was 15.1 million hectares. A big growth area was livestock. The opening of roads facilitated this growth. As of 2004 this region produced only 2.7% of the nation's horticulture.

In 2020, the Midwest produced 46% of the country's cereals, vegetables and oilseeds: 111.5 million tons.

In 2020, Mato Grosso was the leader in the national grain production, with 28.0%. Goiás (10.0%) was in 4th place, and Mato Grosso do Sul (7.9%) in 5th place.

Goiás is the 2nd largest producer of sugarcane in the country, 11.3% of national production, with 75.7 million tons harvested in the 2019–20 harvest. Mato Grosso do Sul is in fourth place, with around 49 million tons harvested. Mato Grosso harvested 16 million tons, being in 6th place.

Mato Grosso is the largest producer of soy in Brazil, with 26.9% of the total produced in 2020 (33.0 million tons), and the 3rd largest producer of beans, with 10.5% of Brazilian production.

Goiás has the national leadership in the production of sorghum: it produced 44% of the Brazilian crop production in the 2019–2020 cycle, with a harvest of 1.09 million tons.

In 2017, Mato Grosso was the largest producer of corn in the country with 58 million tons; fourth, Goiás, with 22 million.

Goiás is also the Brazilian leader in tomato production: in 2019 it produced over 1.2 million tons, a third of the country's total production.

Mato Grosso is also the largest producer of cotton in Brazil, with around 65% of national production (1.8 out of the 2.8 million tons harvested in the country). Goiás is in 4th place.

In cassava production, Brazil produced a total of 17.6 million tons in 2018. Mato Grosso do Sul was the 6th largest producer in the country, with 721 thousand tons. Mato Grosso produced 287 thousand tons. Goiás produced 201 thousand tons.

In 2019, Goiás became the leader of the Brazilian production of garlic.

==== Northeast ====
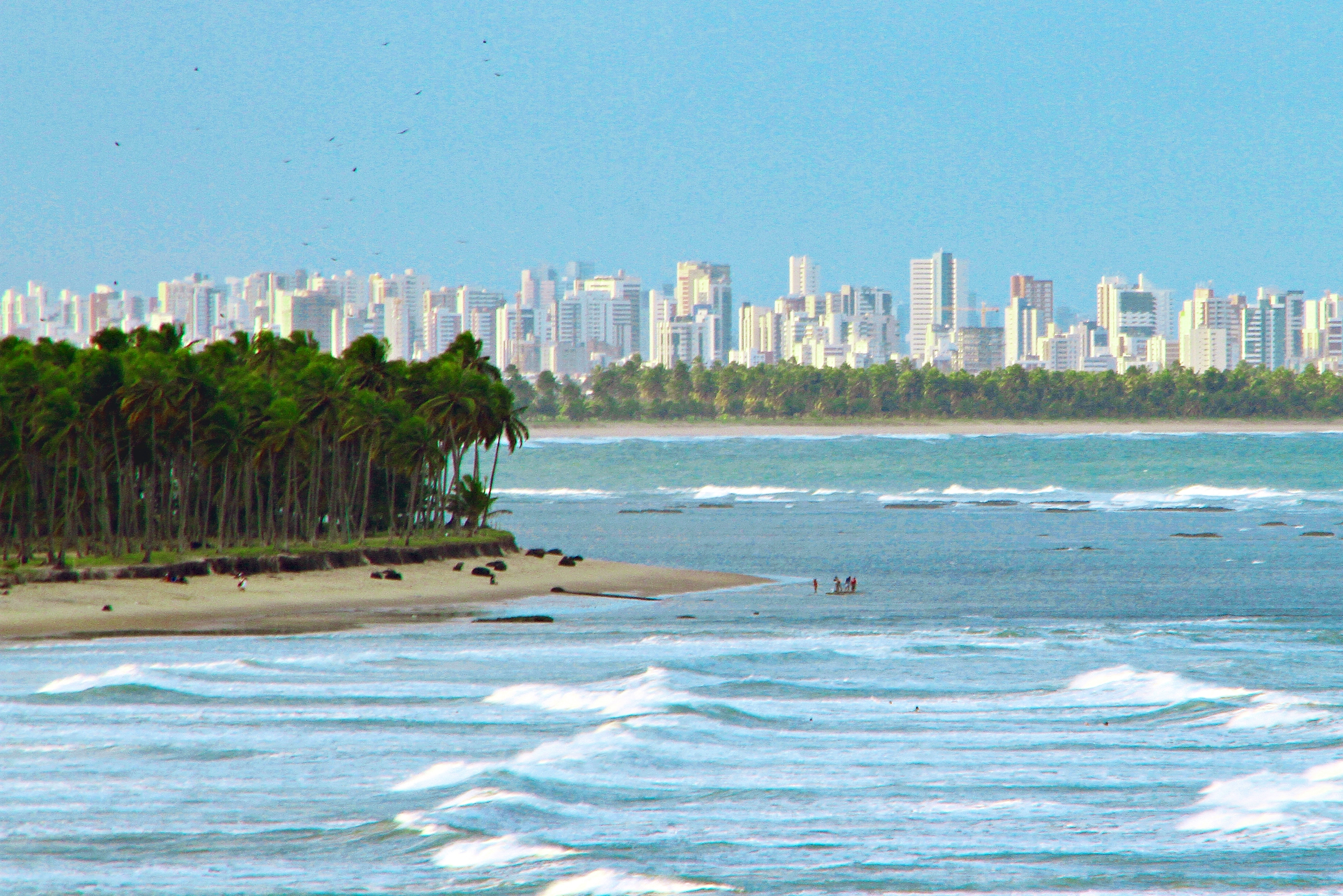
Coconut trees in Pernambuco

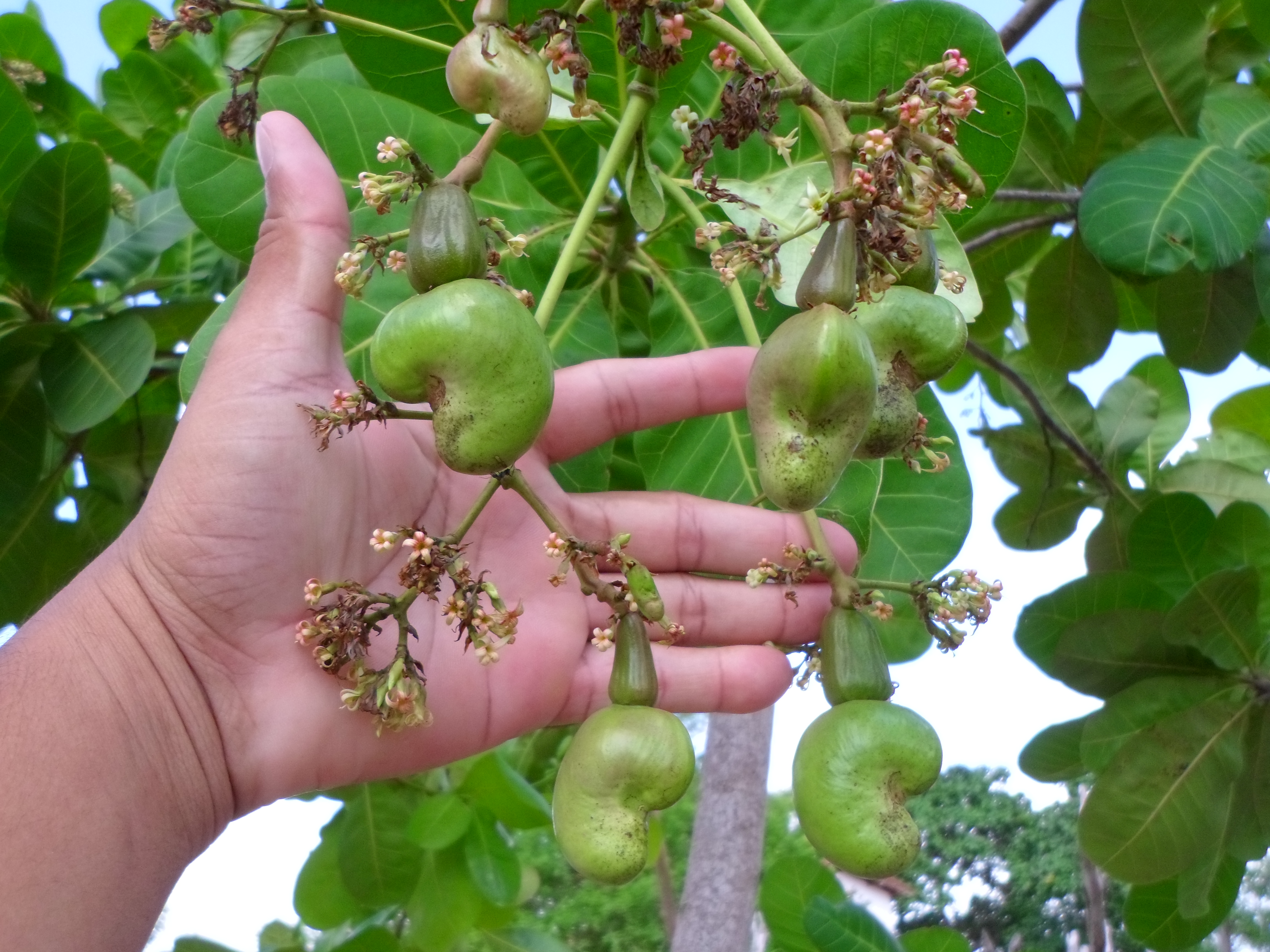
Cashew in Ceará

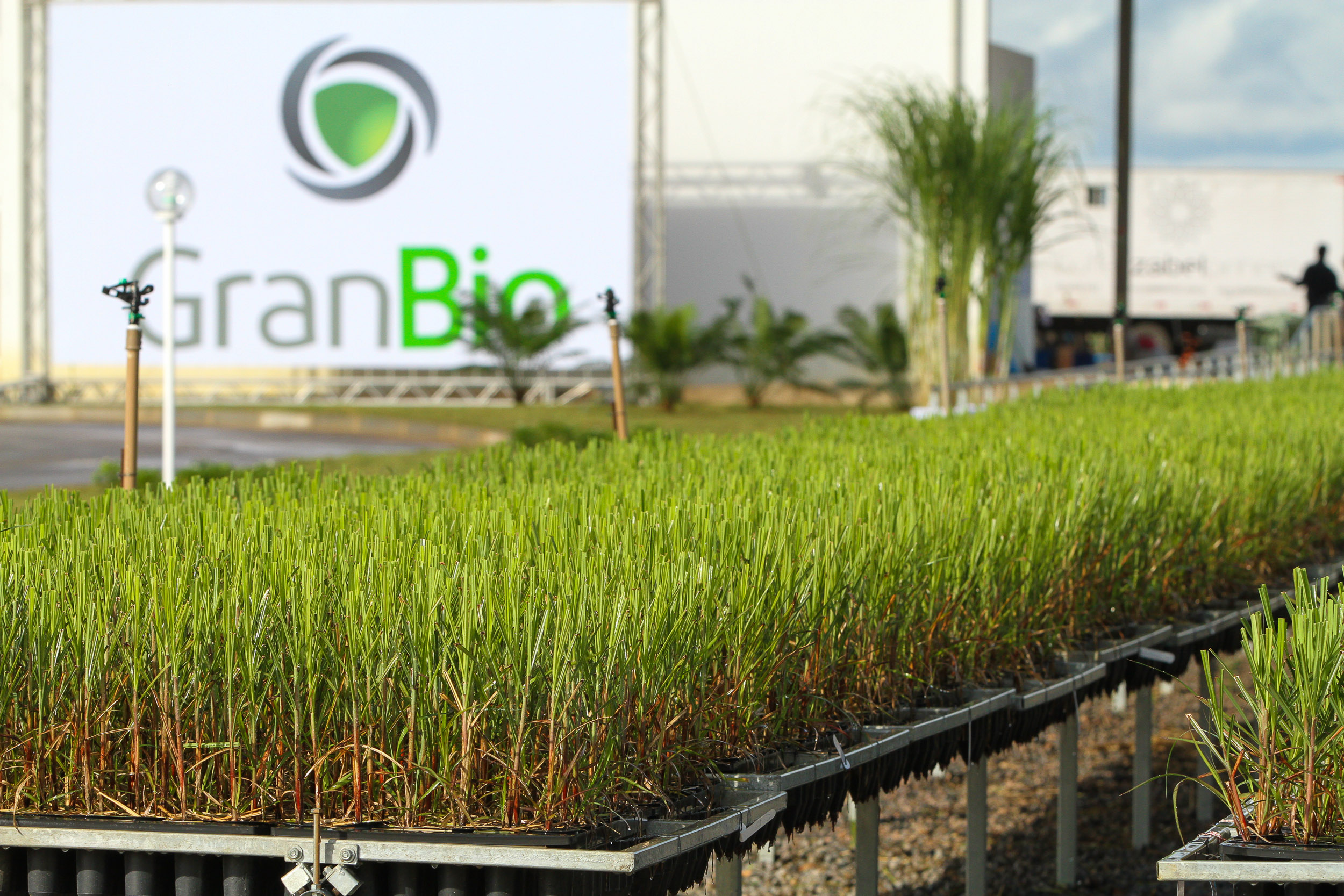
Sugar cane in Alagoas

The Northeast includes Bahia, Sergipe, Pernambuco, Alagoas, Paraíba, Rio Grande do Norte, Ceará, Piauí and Maranhão. Farms are primarily family-owned; 82.9% of field labor is on family farms. The region is a major producer of cashew nuts, sugar cane, cocoa, cotton and tropical fruits in general (mainly coconut, papaya, melon, banana, mango, pineapple and guarana). It also has relevant soy, corn, bean, cassava and orange productions.

The region is subject to prolonged dry spells that are worse in El Niño years. This causes a periodic rural exodus. Government responses include dams and the transfer of the São Francisco River. The worst recent droughts were in 1993, 1998 and 1999. The latter was the worst in fifty years.

In 2017, the Northeast Region was the largest producer of coconut in the country, with 74.0% of national production. Bahia produced 351 million fruits, Sergipe, 234 million, and Ceará 187 million. However, the sector has been suffering strong competition and losing market to Indonesia, the Philippines and India, the world's largest producers, who even export coconut water to Brazil. In addition to climatic problems, the low productivity of coconut palms in the Northeast Region is the result of factors related to the variety of coconut harvested and the technological level used in coastal regions. In these areas, the semi-extractive cultivation system still prevails, with low fertility and without the adoption of cultural management practices. The three states that have the largest production, Bahia, Sergipe and Ceará, present a yield three times lower than that of Pernambuco, which is in 5th place in the national production. This is because most of the coconut trees in these three states are located in coastal areas and cultivated in semi-extractivist systems.

The production of cashew in Brazil is carried out almost exclusively in the Northeast. The area occupied by cashew trees in Brazil in 2017 was estimated at 505,500 ha; of this total, 99.5% is located in the Northeast. The main producers in this region are Ceará (61.6% of the national area), Rio Grande do Norte and Piauí. However, Brazil, which in 2011 was the fifth largest world producer of cashew nuts, in 2016, fell to 14th position, with 1.5% of the total volume of nuts produced in the world. Vietnam, Nigeria, India and Côte d'Ivoire were the world's largest cashew nut producers in 2016, with 70.6% of global production. In recent years, there has been increased competition with some African countries, where government programs have driven the expansion of culture and processing capacity. It is estimated that at 295 thousand tons per year the installed capacity for processing cashew nuts in the Northeast, however, the Region only managed to produce around a quarter of that quantity. Among the main world producers, Brazil has the lowest productivity. Several factors are pointed out as the cause of the low productivity and the fall in the Brazilian production of cashew nuts. One reason is that most orchards are in a phase of natural decline in production. In addition, the giant cashew trees, which are the majority in the Region, are exploited in an almost extractive manner, with low use of technology.

In the production of cocoa, for a long time, Bahia led the Brazilian production. Today, it is disputing the leadership of national production with the state of Pará. In 2017 Pará obtained the leadership for the first time. In 2019, people from Pará harvested 135 thousand tons of cocoa, and Bahians harvested 130 thousand tons. Bahia's cocoa area is practically three times larger than that of Pará, but Pará's productivity is practically three times greater. Some factors that explain this are: the crops in Bahia are more extractivist, and those in Pará have a more modern and commercial style, in addition to paraenses using more productive and resistant seeds, and their region providing resistance to Witch's broom.

In 2018, the Northeast was in 3rd place among the regions that most produce sugar cane in the country. Brazil is the world's largest producer, with 672.8 million tons harvested this year. The Northeast harvested 45.7 million tons, 6.8% of national production. Alagoas is the largest producer, with 33.3% of Northeastern production (15.2 million tons). Pernambuco is the 2nd largest producer in the Northeast, with 22.7% of the total in the region (10.3 million tons). Paraíba has 11.9% of northeastern production (5.5 million tons) and Bahia, 10.24% of production (4.7 million tons).

Bahia is the 2nd largest producer of cotton in Brazil, losing only to Mato Grosso. In 2019, it harvested 1.5 million tonnes of the product.

In soy, Brazil produced close to 120 million tons in 2019, being the largest world producer. In 2019, the Northeast produced close to 10.7 million tons, or 9% of the Brazilian total. The largest producers in the Northeast were Bahia (5.3 million tons), Maranhão (3 million tons) and Piauí (2.4 million tons).

In the production of corn, in 2018 Brazil was the 3rd largest producer in the world, with 82 million tons. The Northeast produced about 8.4% of the country's total. Bahia was the largest producer in the Northeast, with 2.2 million tons. Piauí was the 2nd largest producer in the Northeast, with 1.5 million tons, and Maranhão was the 3rd largest, with 1.3 million tons.

In 2018, the South Region was the main producer of beans with 26.4% of the total, followed by the Midwest (25.4%), Southeast Region (25.1%), Northeast (20.6%) and North (2.5%). The largest producers in the Northeast were Ceará, Bahia, Piauí and Pernambuco.

In cassava production, Brazil produced a total of 17.6 million tons in 2018. Maranhão was the 7th largest producer in the country, with 681 thousand tons. Ceará was 9th, with 622 thousand tons. Bahia was 10th with 610 thousand tons. In total, the northeast produced 3,5 million tons.

About orange, Bahia was the 4th largest producer in Brazil in 2018, with a total of 604 thousand tons. Sergipe was 6th, with 354 thousand tons. Alagoas was 7th with 166 thousand tons.

Bahia is the second largest fruit producer in the country, with more than 3.3 million tons a year, behind São Paulo. The north of Bahia is one of the main fruit suppliers in the country. The State is one of the main national producers of ten types of fruit. In 2017, Bahia led the production of cajarana, coconut, count fruit or pinecone, soursop, umbu, jackfruit, licuri, mango and passion fruit, and is in second place in cocoa almond, atemoia, cupuaçu, lime and lemon, and third in banana, carambola, guava, papaya, watermelon, melon, cherry, pomegranate and table grapes. In all, 34 products from Bahia's fruit culture have an important participation in the national economy.

Rio Grande do Norte is the largest producer of melon in the country. In 2017 it produced 354 thousand tons, distributed between the cities of Mossoró, Tibau and Apodi. The Northeast region accounted for 95.8% of the country's production in 2007. In addition to Rio Grande do Norte, which in 2005 produced 45.4% of the country's total, the other 3 largest in the country were Ceará, Bahia and Pernambuco.

In the production of papaya, in 2018 Bahia was the 2nd largest producer state in Brazil, almost equaling with Espírito Santo. Ceará was in 3rd place and Rio Grande do Norte in 4th place.

Bahia was the largest producer of mango in the country in 2019, with production of around 281 thousand tons per year. Juazeiro (130 thousand tons per year) and Casa Nova (54 thousand tons per year) are at the top of the list of Brazilian cities that lead the cultivation of fruit.

In the production of banana, in 2018 Bahia was the 2nd largest national producer. Pernambuco came in 5th place.

Regarding pineapple, in 2018 Paraíba was the 2nd largest producer state in Brazil.

Bahia is the largest Brazilian producer of guaraná. In 2017, Brazilian production was close to 3.3 million tons. Bahia harvested 2.3 million (mainly in the city of Taperoá), Amazonas 0.7 million (mainly in the city of Maués) and the rest of the country, 0.3 million. Despite the fact that the fruit originated in the Amazon, since 1989 Bahia has beaten Amazonas in terms of production volume and guarana productivity, due to the fact that the soil in Bahia is more favorable, in addition to the absence of diseases in the region. The most famous users of the product, however, acquire 90% to 100% of their guarana from the Amazon region, such as AMBEV and Coca-Cola. Bahian guarana prices are well below those of other states, but Sudam's tax exemptions lead the beverage industry to prefer to purchase seeds in the North, which helps maintain the highest added value of Amazonian guarana. The pharmaceutical industries and importers, on the other hand, buy more guarana from Bahia, due to the price.

==== North ====
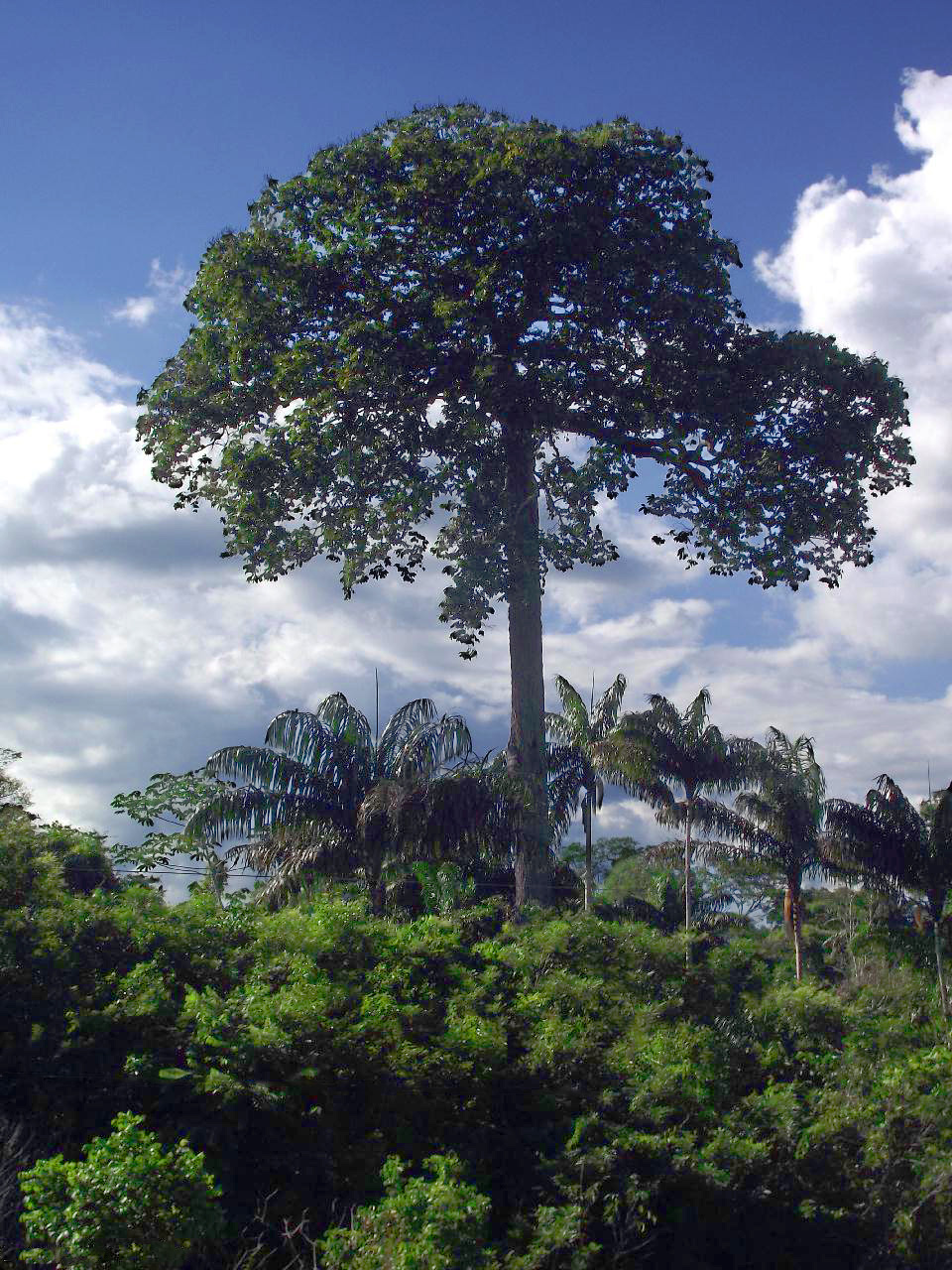
Chestnut tree in Pará

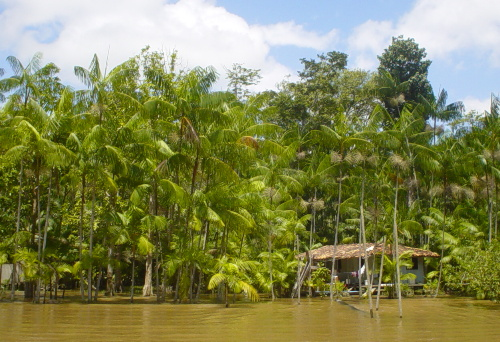
Acai trees in Pará

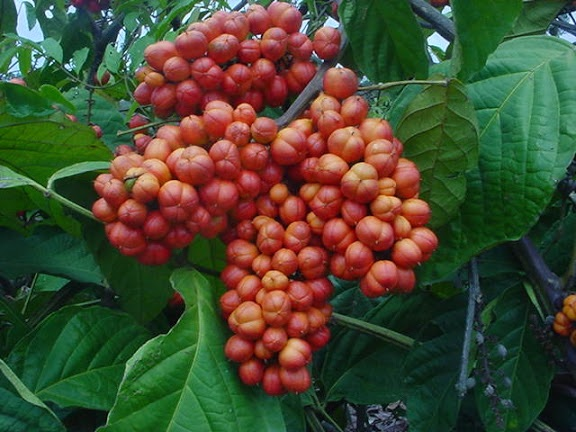
Guarana in Rondonia

The Northern region includes Acre, Amapá, Amazonas, Pará, Rondônia, Roraima and Tocantins. The Amazon rainforest occupies a significant part of the region. The region's great challenge is to combine farming with forest preservation. The region has a large production of cassava and tropical fruits such as açaí, pineapple, coconut, cocoa, banana and guarana, in addition to being a big producer of Brazil nut, black pepper and soy.

Between the end of the 19th century and early 20th century, during the so-called Rubber Boom, the region produced rubber, Brazil's most important export, until Asian production underpriced Brazil and shut down the industry.

In cassava production, Brazil produced a total of 17.6 million tons in 2018. Pará was the largest producer in the country, with 3.8 million tons. Amazonas was 5th, with 889 thousand tons. Acre was 8th with 667 thousand tons. In total, the north produced 6,4 million tons.

In 2019, Pará produced 95% of açaí in Brazil. The state traded more than 1.2 million tons of the fruit, worth more than US$1.5 billion, about 3% of the state's GDP. The second largest producer of açaí in Brazil is Amazonas (52 thousand tons), followed by Roraima (3.5 thousand tons).

In 2018, Pará was the largest Brazilian producer of pineapple, with 426 million fruits harvested on almost 19 thousand hectares. In 2017, Brazil was the 3rd largest producer in the world (close to 1.5 billion fruits harvested on approximately 60 thousand hectares). It is the fifth most cultivated fruit in the country. The southeast of Pará has 85% of the state production: the cities of Floresta do Araguaia (76.45%), Conceição do Araguaia (8.42%) and Salvaterra (3.12%) led the ranking this year. Floresta do Araguaia also has the largest concentrated fruit juice industry in Brazil, exporting to European Union, United States and Mercosur.

Pará is also one of the largest Brazilian producers of coconut. In 2019, it was the 3rd largest producer in the country, with 191.8 million fruits harvested, second only to Bahia and Ceará.

Pará is the 2nd largest Brazilian producer of black pepper, with 34 thousand tons harvested in 2018.

The Brazil nut has always been one of the main products of extraction in Northern Brazil, with collection on the forest floor. However, in recent decades, the commercial cultivation of Brazil nut was created. There are already properties with more than 1 million chestnut trees for large-scale production. The annual production averages in Brazil varied between 20 thousand and 40 thousand tons per year in 2016.

In the production of cocoa, Pará has been competing with Bahia for the leadership of Brazilian production. In 2017 Pará obtained the leadership for the first time. In 2019, people from Pará harvested 135 thousand tons of cocoa, and Bahians harvested 130 thousand tons. Bahia's cocoa area is practically three times larger than that of Pará, but Pará's productivity is practically three times greater. Some factors that explain this are: the crops in Bahia are more extractivist, and those in Pará have a more modern and commercial style, in addition to paraenses using more productive and resistant seeds, and their region providing resistance to Witch's broom. Rondônia is the 3rd largest cocoa producer in the country, with 18 thousand tons harvested in 2017.

Amazonas is the 2nd largest Brazilian producer of guaraná. In 2017, Brazilian production was close to 3.3 million tons. Bahia harvested 2.3 million (mainly in the city of Taperoá), Amazonas 0.7 million (mainly in the city of Maués) and the rest of the country, 0.3 million. Despite the fact that the fruit originated in the Amazon, since 1989 Bahia has beaten Amazonas in terms of production volume and guarana productivity, due to the fact that the soil in Bahia is more favorable, in addition to the absence of diseases in the region. The most famous users of the product, however, acquire 90% to 100% of their guarana from the Amazon region, such as AMBEV and Coca-Cola. Bahian guarana prices are well below those of other states, but Sudam's tax exemptions lead the beverage industry to prefer to purchase seeds in the North, which helps maintain the highest added value of Amazonian guarana. The pharmaceutical industries and importers, on the other hand, buy more guarana from Bahia, due to the price.

In soy, Tocantins, Pará and Rondônia stand out. In the 2019 harvest, Tocantins harvested 3 million tons, Pará 1.8 million, and Rondônia 1.2 million. Production is constantly growing in the northern states.

In 2018, it had 13% of the national production of banana: Pará, the largest state in the North in the production of this fruit, occupied the 6th national position.

== Products ==
The principal agricultural products of Brazil include cattle, coffee, cotton, corn, rice, soy, wheat, sugarcane, tobacco, beans, floriculture, fruit, forestry, vegetables and cassava.

=== Cattle ===
Cattle
| Year | 1960 | 1980 | 1990 | 2000 | 2005 |
| Million head | 78.54 | 118.08 | 147.10 | 169.87 | 207.15 |

Brazil in 2005 produced around 8.7 million tonnes of beef, becoming world export leader in 2003 after surpassing Australia. Cattle herds are concentrated in Mato Grosso, Mato Grosso do Sul, Goiás and Minas Gerais. Together they account for over 46% of Brazilian cattle with more than 87 million head.

According to the Ministry of Agriculture, Brazilian beef production grew on average 6.1% a year from 1990 to 2003, and reached 7.6 million tonnes. In 2003, Brazil exported over 1.4 million tonnes of beef, earning around $1.5 billion. Leather exports that year passed the $1 billion mark.

In 2019, Brazil was the holder of the second largest herd of cattle in the world, 22.2% of the world herd, only behind India. In 2018, the country was also the second largest producer of beef, responsible for 15.4% of global production (10 million tons). In 2016, Brazilian beef exports in natura totaled 1.08 million tons with a value of R $4.35 billion. In 2019, beef was the 6th most important product in Brazil's export basket (almost 3% of Brazilian exports, totaling U $6.5 billion).

=== Coffee ===
In 2020, Minas Gerais was the largest producer of Coffea arabica in the country, with 74% of the national total (1.9 million tons, or 31.2 million 60 kg bags). Espírito Santo was the largest producer of Coffea canephora, with a 66.3% share of the total (564.5 thousand tons, or 9.4 million 60 kg bags). In 2017, Minas accounted for 54.3% of the total national coffee production (1st place), Espírito Santo accounted for 19.7% (second place) and São Paulo, 9.8% (third place).

In 2018, Brazil produced 3.5 million tons of coffee, being the largest producer in the world. The states that produce the most are mainly Minas Gerais (33.46 million bags) and Espírito Santo (13.6 million bags), followed by São Paulo (6.15 million bags), Bahia (4,13 million bags), Rondônia (2.43 million bags) and Paraná (937.6 thousand bags). In 2019, coffee was the 10th most important product in Brazil's export basket (2% of exports, at a value of U $4.5 billion).

=== Cotton ===
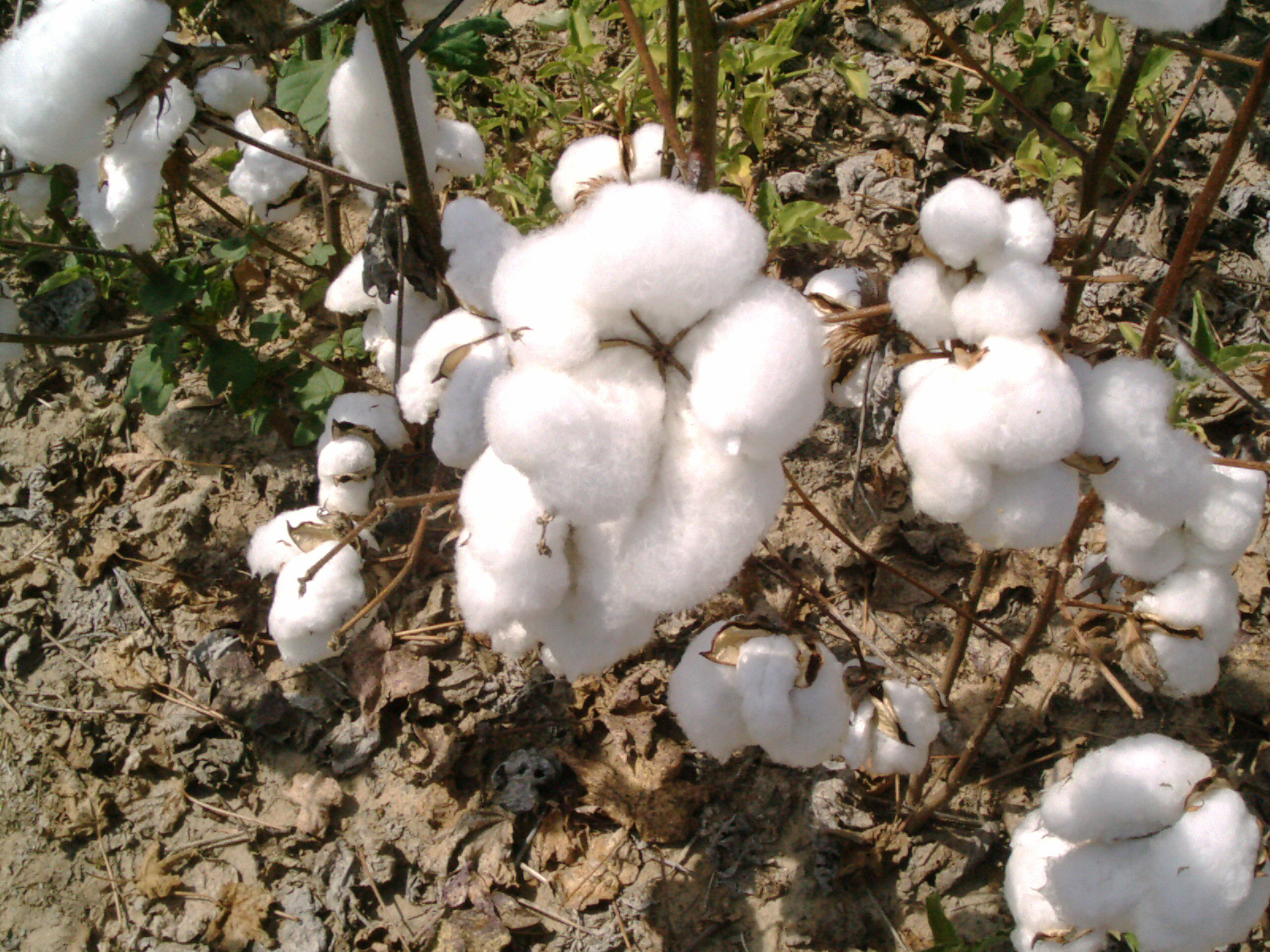
Cotton planted in the cerrado region of Bahia

Yield increases were sufficient to substantially increase output between the 1960s and the twenty-first century, despite reduced acreage. In the 1990s production moved from the South and Southeast regions to the Center-West and to the West of Bahia. Exports began in 2001.

Brazil's entry in the cotton market led them to charge the US with illegal subsidies and tariffs. The Brazilian plea went to the World Trade Organization in 2002. WTO approved sanctions in 2009.

In 2018, Brazil produced 4.9 million tons of cotton, being the 4th largest producer in the world. The states that produce the most are, mainly, Mato Grosso and Bahia (where most of the national production is), followed by Minas Gerais and Goiás. In 2019, cotton was the 19th most important product in Brazil's export basket, at a value of U $2.6 billion.

=== Corn ===
Corn
| Year | 1960 | 1970 | 1980 | 1989 | 2000 | 2005 |
| Million metric tons | 8.67 | 14.21 | 20.37 | 26.57 | 32.32 | 35.13 |

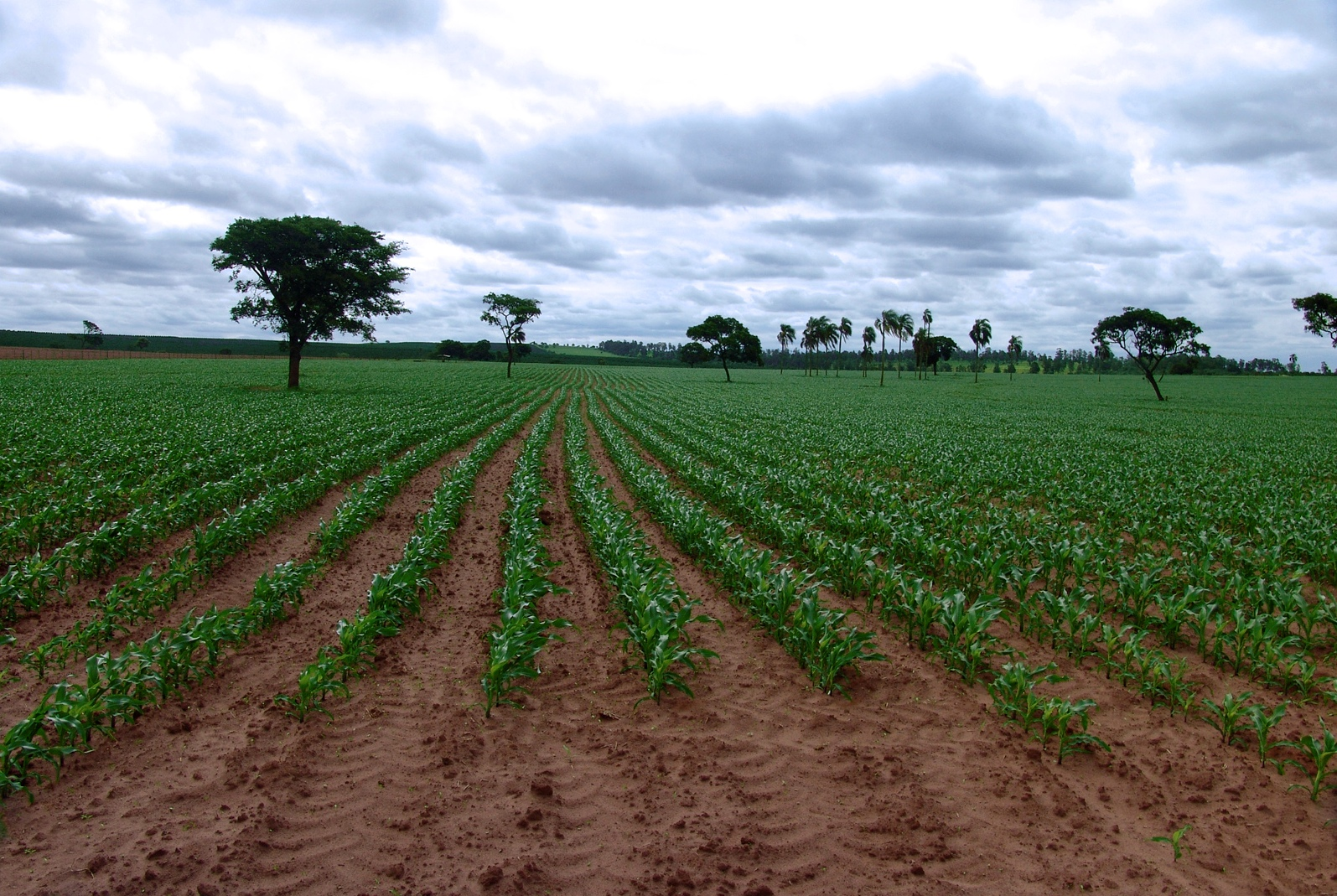
Cornfield, São Paulo

Brazilian corn has two harvests per year. The main harvest is during the rainy season and a second, "dry cultivation" harvest follows during the dry season. In the South the main harvest is in late August; while in the Southeast and Center-West, it happens in October and November and in the Northeast, by year end. The second harvest is in Paraná, São Paulo and in the Center-West, in February and March.

In 2018, Brazil produced 82.2 million tons of corn, being the 3rd largest producer in the world. The states that produce the most are: Mato Grosso, Paraná, Goiás, Mato Grosso do Sul and Rio Grande do Sul. In 2019, corn was the 5th most important product on the Brazilian export basket, with 3.3% of national exports in 2019, worth US$7.3 billion.

=== Rice ===
Rice
| Year | 1960 | 1970 | 1980 | 1989 | 2000 | 2005 |
| Million metric tons | 4.79 | 7.55 | 9.77 | 11.04 | 11.13 | 13.19 |

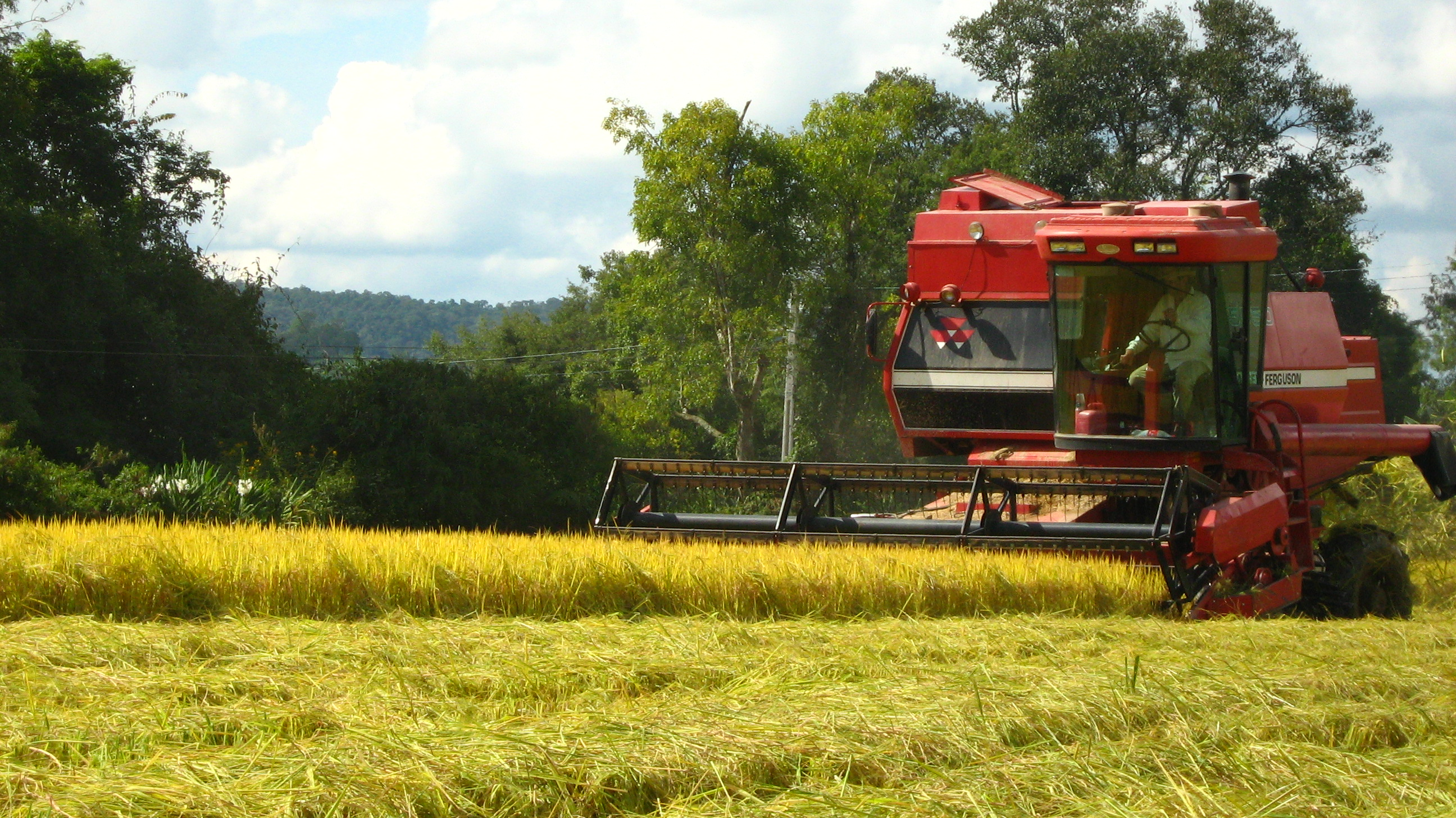
Rice harvest, Rio do Sul, Santa Catarina

In the 1980s Brazil evolved from exporting to importing rice in small quantities to meet domestic demand. In the following decade, it became one of the main importers, reaching two million tons, equivalent to 10% of domestic demand by 1997–8. Uruguay and Argentina are the main suppliers of the cereal to the country.

In 1998, farmers planted 3.845 million ha, decreasing by 2008, to 2.847 million. Production grew from 11.582 million tons to an estimated 12.177 million tons.

Rio Grande do Sul is the largest producer of rice in the country, with 70.5% of Brazil's production, close to 7.3 million tons in 2020. Santa Catarina was the second largest national producer, with around 1.1 million tons of the product.

=== Soybean ===
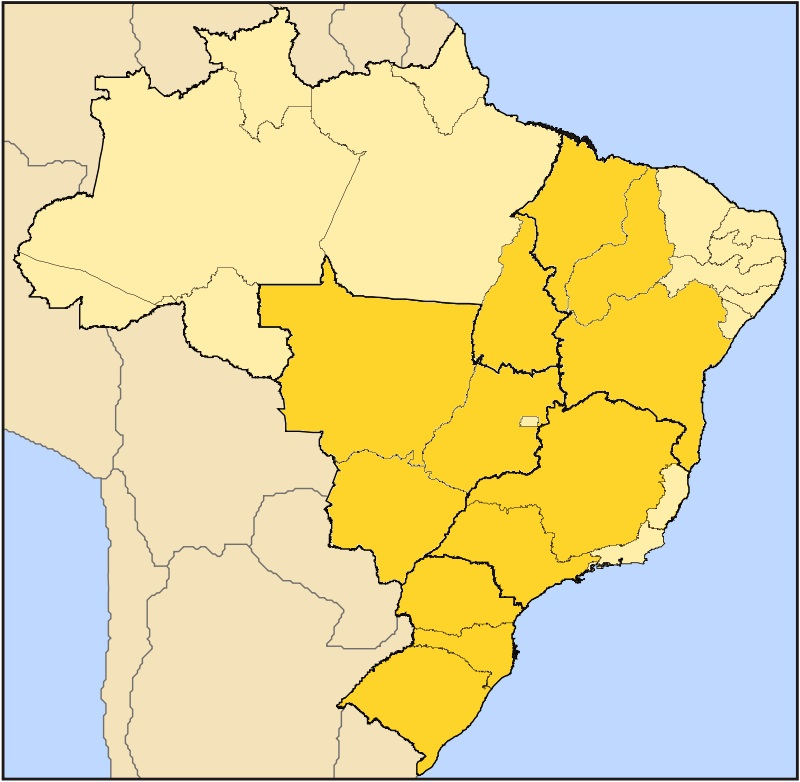
Main soybean producing states in Brazil in 2020, in dark yellow

Soybean Production
| Year | 1960 | 1970 | 1980 | 1989 | 2000 | 2005 |
| Million metric tons | 0.20 | 1.50 | 15.15 | 24.07 | 32.82 | 51.18 |

Soybean production began in 1882. From the beginning of the 20th century soy was used for animal fodder. In 1941, grain production surpassed forage use, becoming the main focus. Brazilian soybean production increased more than 3000% between 1970 and 2005. Yield increased 37.8% from 1990 to 2005. By 2001 Brazilian farmer planted almost 13 million ha of soybean, despite being a more recent commodity-boom. Soybean and soybean derivatives exports in 2005 alone earned over US$9 billion for Brazil.

However, with Brazil's success in the soybean industry comes their country also having one of the world's highest rates of deforestation. This large-scale shift in land-use has local effects too. In the southeastern Amazon's Xingu Indigenous Territory, Indigenous people's lives are negatively effected through decreased water quality, pesticides, and increased fire and drought.

The production of soybeans is extremely lucrative, despite not being a labor-intensive crop. In the South of Brazil, many small farmers and agricultural laborers were forced to migrate due to increasing costs associated with soybean expansion.

Brazil harvested in 2020 a total of 131 million tons, being the world's largest producer. Soy is the most important product on the country's export basket: it is the 1st place on the list, with 12% of the country's exports, at a value of U $26 billion in 2019; the country also exports soybean meal, which is the 8th most exported product (2.6% of Brazilian exports, worth U $5.8 billion in 2019) and soy oil (1.0 million tonnes in 2019, worth U $0.7 billion).

Mato Grosso is the largest producer of soy in Brazil, with 26.9% of the total produced in 2020 (33.0 million tons). Paraná and Rio Grande do Sul were the second and third largest producers in the country, with about 16% of national production for each one. Paraná produced 19.8 million tons in 2020, and Rio Grande do Sul produced 19.3 million tons. Goiás is the 4th largest producer, with 13 million tons; Mato Grosso do Sul in 5th with 10.5 million tons; Bahia in 6th with 5.3 million tons; Minas Gerais in 7th with 5 million tons; Maranhão, São Paulo and Tocantins in 8th to 10th places with 3 million tons each; Piauí in 11th with 2.4 million tons and Santa Catarina in 12th with 2.3 million tons.

There has been a "Soy Moratorium" in place, since 2008, where major exporters of soybeans have promised not to purchase of finance soybeans produced in deforested areas in the Amazon.

=== Wheat ===
Wheat Production
| Year | 1960 | 1970 | 1980 | 1989 | 2000 | 2005 |
| Million metric tons | 0.71 | 1.84 | 2.70 | 5.55 | 1.72 | 4.65 |

Two of Brazil's coldest states, Paraná and Rio Grande do Sul, account for over 90% of wheat production. Brazil imports around US$700 million in wheat every year.

Rio Grande do Sul is the largest national producer of wheat, with 2.3 million tons in 2019. Paraná is the 2nd largest producer, with a production almost identical to Rio Grande do Sul. In 2019, the 2 states harvested together about 85% of Brazil's harvest, but even so, the country is one of the largest global importers of cereal, having imported about 7 million tons this year, to meet a consumption of 12 million tons. Most of the wheat that Brazil imports comes from Argentina.

=== Sugarcane ===
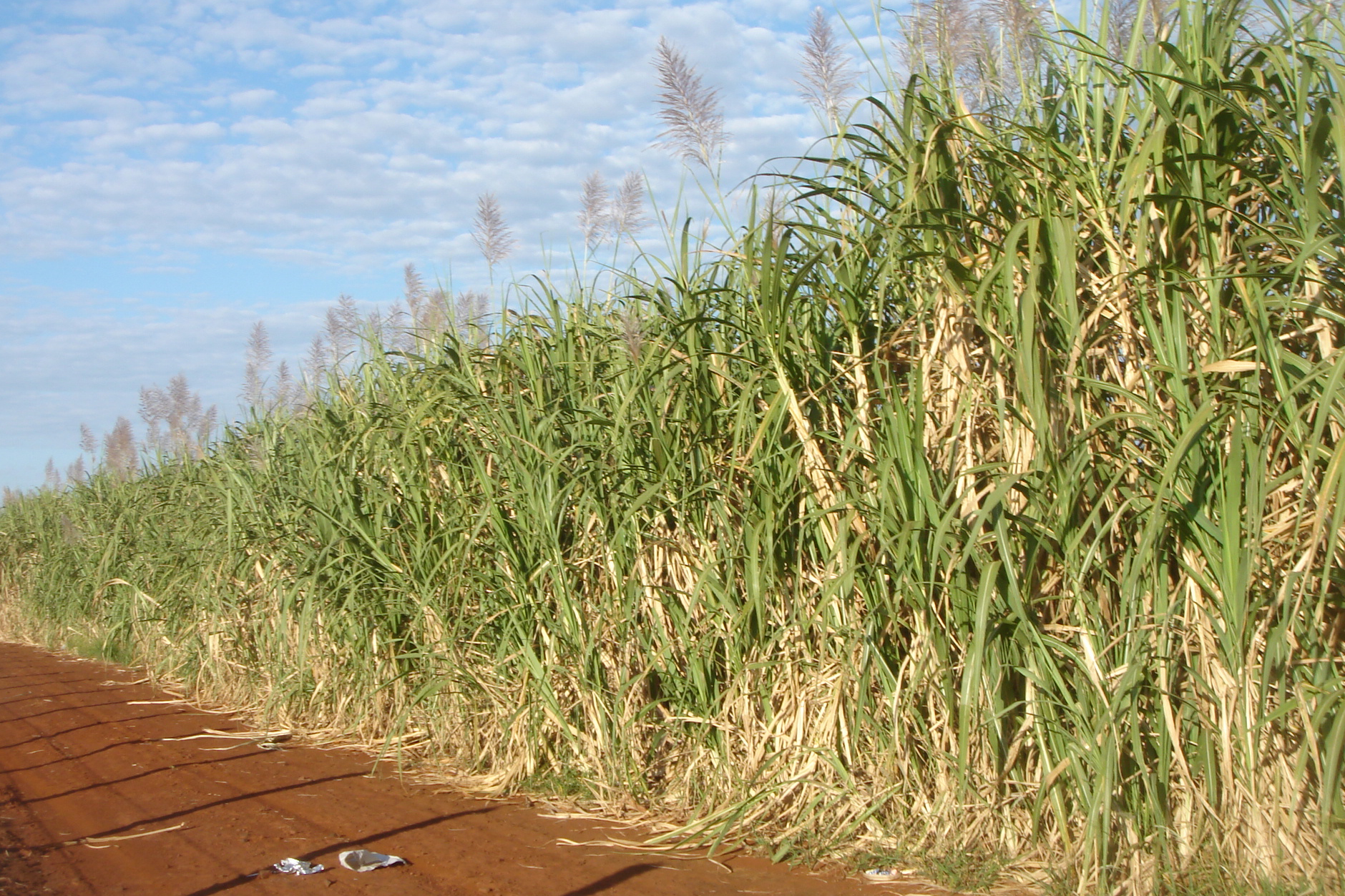
Cane field in São Paulo

During the colonial period, Brazil depended heavily on sugarcane and continued to lead world sugarcane production into the twenty-first century.

Production is concentrated (90%) in São Paulo, Alagoas, Pernambuco, Minas Gerais, Mato Grosso, Mato Grosso do Sul, Goiás and Paraná.

Sugarcane was grown industrially for sugar for around a century. It was during the 1970s oil crisis, that the Brazilian government shifted toward ethanol production. They created the program ProAlcool which incentivized ethanol production as the preferred alternative to importing gasoline. ProAlcool also established a mandate to blend 5% ethanol with gasoline, which increased to 22% over time. The government also subsidized the auto industry to produce cars fueled with 100% hydrated ethanol.

Brazil harvested 558 million tonnes of sugarcane in 2007, representing a growth of 17.62% over 2006. For 2008, Brazil harvested 648,921,280 tonnes, of which total 89% was used for sugar and ethanol production. The other 11% was used for cachaça and rapadura production, as animal feed and as seeds. Ethanol production in 2008 was predicted to reach 26.4 billion litres.

Sugarcane monocultures in regions such as Minas Gerais, São Paulo (state), and Mato Grosso, have largely impacted land ownership in the region, as land become reterritorialized and consolidated for sugarcane farming.

Brazil is the largest world producer, with 672.8 million tons harvested in 2018. The Southeast is responsible for most of the sugarcane production in the country. In 2020, São Paulo remained the largest national producer, with 341.8 million tons, responsible for 51.2% of production. Goiás is the 2nd largest producer of sugarcane in the country, 11.3% of national production, with 75.7 million tons harvested in the 2019–20 harvest. Minas Gerais was the third largest sugarcane producer, accounting for 11.1% of the total produced in the country, with 74.3 million tons. Mato Grosso do Sul is in fourth place, with around 49 million tons harvested. Paraná was, in 2017, the fifth largest producer of cane, third of sugar and fifth of alcohol in the country. It harvested about 46 million tons of cane this year. Mato Grosso harvested 16 million tons, being in 6th place.

From 2003 to 2011, the area of cultivated sugarcane increased from less than 5 million hectares to over 10.5 million hectares.

In 2019, sugar was the 9th most important product on the Brazilian export basket (2% of exports, at a value of U $4.6 billion). Biomass also was responsible for 8.8% of electric energy generation for the country in 2021.

Jair Bolsonaro, the Brazilian President, issued a decree in November 2019 that lifted a 2009 decree, banning sugarcane farming in the Amazon rainforest and Pantanal. Increased sugarcane production associated with this decree has piqued concerns in researchers about environmental degradation. Current laws in Brazil following this decree require that 35% of native vegetation be conserved in Pantanal, and 80% in the Amazon. Sugarcane cultivation under this decree can lead to direct deforestation through forests being cleared for new sugarcane plantations, as well as through indirect changes in the land use. Soybeans are another prevalent crop in these regions, and as sugarcane plantations take over soybean fields, indirect deforestation occurs through forest clearing for soybean cultivation. Harvesting methods in these areas also involve burning which contributes to increased CO_{2} emissions. Mato Grosso is a key state, as this decree takes effect, since it has access to the Amazon, Pantanal and Cerrado. Increased sugarcane production, as with soybean production previously, has been shown to result in a significant surge in land values in this region.

Sugarcane Production
| Year | 1960 | 1970 | 1980 | 1990 | 2000 | 2007 |
| Million metric tons | 56.92 | 79.75 | 148.65 | 262.67 | 326.12 | 558.50 |

=== Tobacco ===
Brazil is the world's second largest tobacco producer, and the largest exporter since 1993, with about 1.7 billion dollars of turnover. The largest export region is Rio Grande do Sul. The Southern region accounts for 95% of external production. It exports 60 to 70% of output.

=== Beans ===
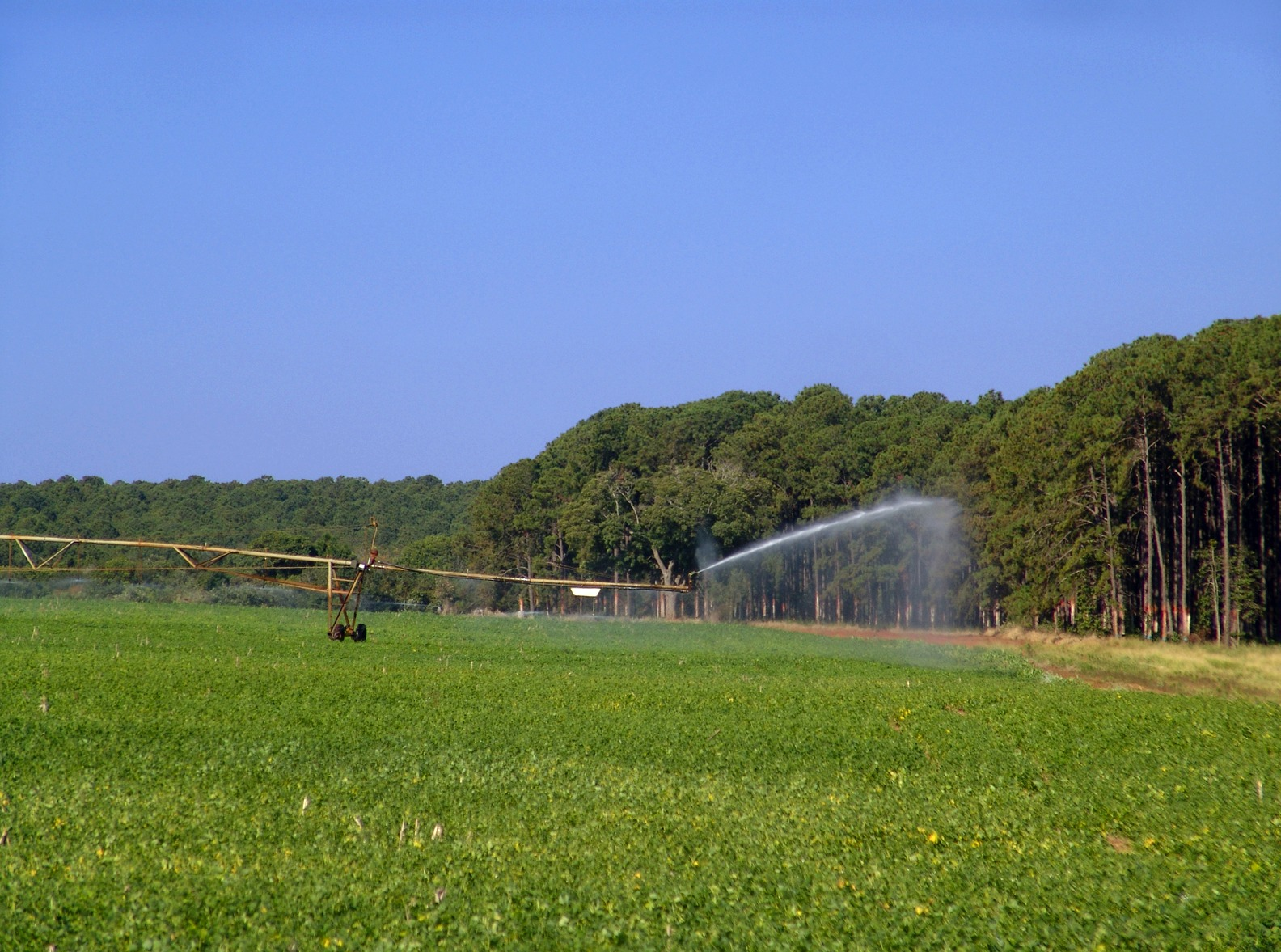
Irrigated beans in Avare, São Paulo

Brazil was the world's largest producer of beans, accounting for 16.3% of the total, 18.7 million tons in 2005, according to FAO. Historically most beans came from small producers. Yield in some cases exceeded three thousand kilos per ha.

Bean acreage decreased from 1984 to 2004 by 25%, while output increased by 16%. It is cultivated throughout the country and harvests come year round.

Brazil imports 100 thousand tons of beans per year.

Since 2006, Paraná has been leading the production of beans in Brazil. Brazil is the 3rd largest producer of beans in the world, with an annual harvest of around 3 million tons, 11% of world production. In 2018, the South Region was the main bean producer with 26.4% of the total, followed by the Midwest (25.4%), Southeast Region (25.1%), Northeast (20.6%) and North (2.5%). The State of Paraná leads the ranking of the main national producers with 18.9% of the total produced.

=== Floriculture and ornamentals ===
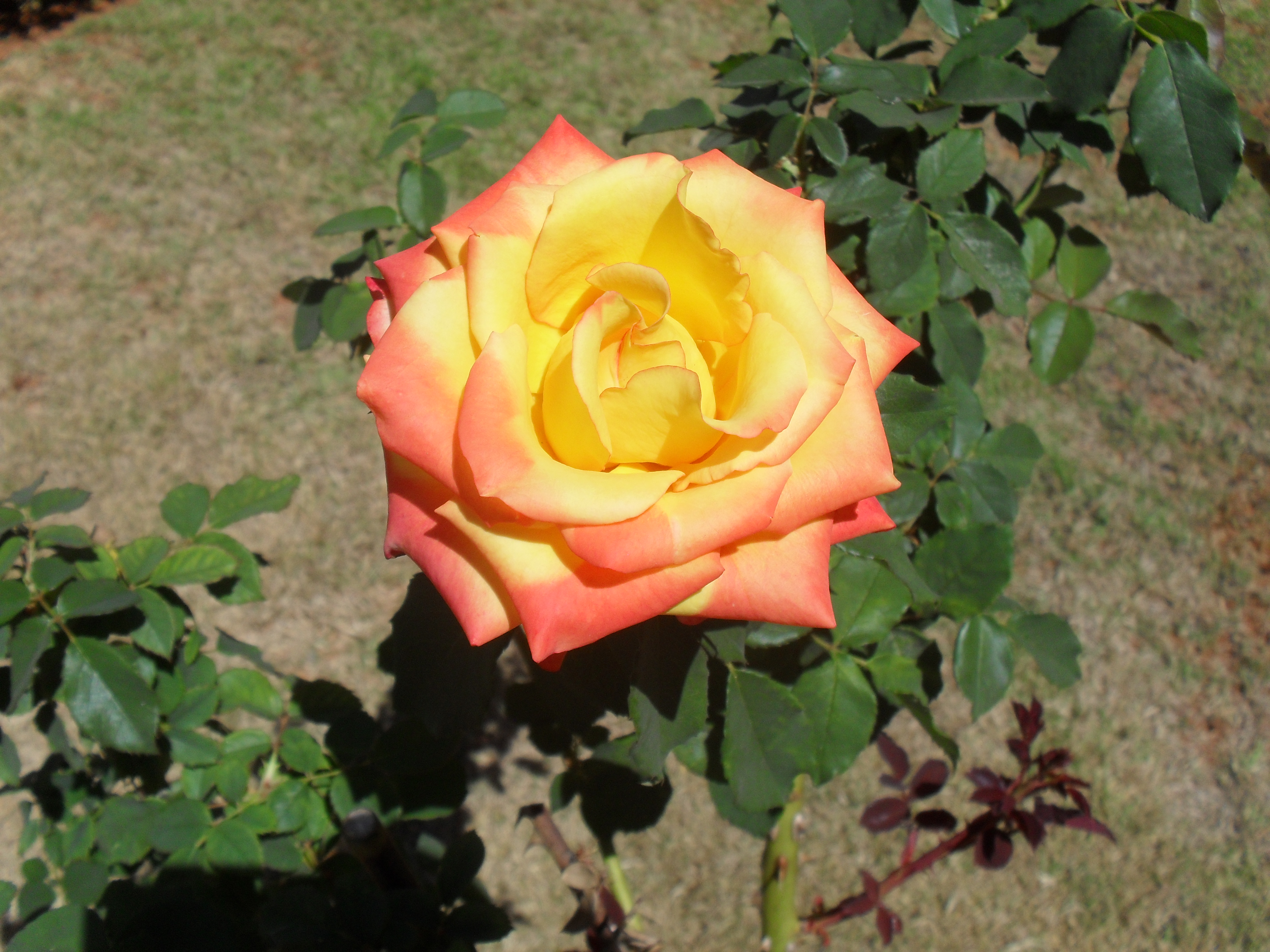
Example of Brazilian rose, in Brasilia

Some three thousand six hundred producers cultivate flowers and ornamental plants in an area of 4,800 ha.

It employs about one hundred twenty thousand people, of which 80% are women, and about 18% are family farms.

The producers from fifteen states are represented by the Brazilian Institute of Floriculture (IBRAFLOR), with government support.

Floriculture began in the 1870s, led by the son of Jean Baptiste Binot, who had come to the country to decorate the Imperial Palace, and whose orchidarium was internationally acknowledged. In 1893, Reggie Dierberger founded a flower company, which later became the Boettcher, pioneers of rose production.

In 1948 Dutch immigrants founded a cooperative in Holambra, a city that still hosts flower production.

Since 2000 the Program of Development of Flowers and Ornamental Plants of the Ministry of Agriculture began. The largest producer is São Paulo state, followed by Santa Catarina, Pernambuco, Alagoas, Ceará, Rio Grande do Sul, Minas Gerais, Rio de Janeiro, Paraná, Goiás, Bahia, Espírito Santo, Amazonas and Pará.

=== Fruits and perennials ===
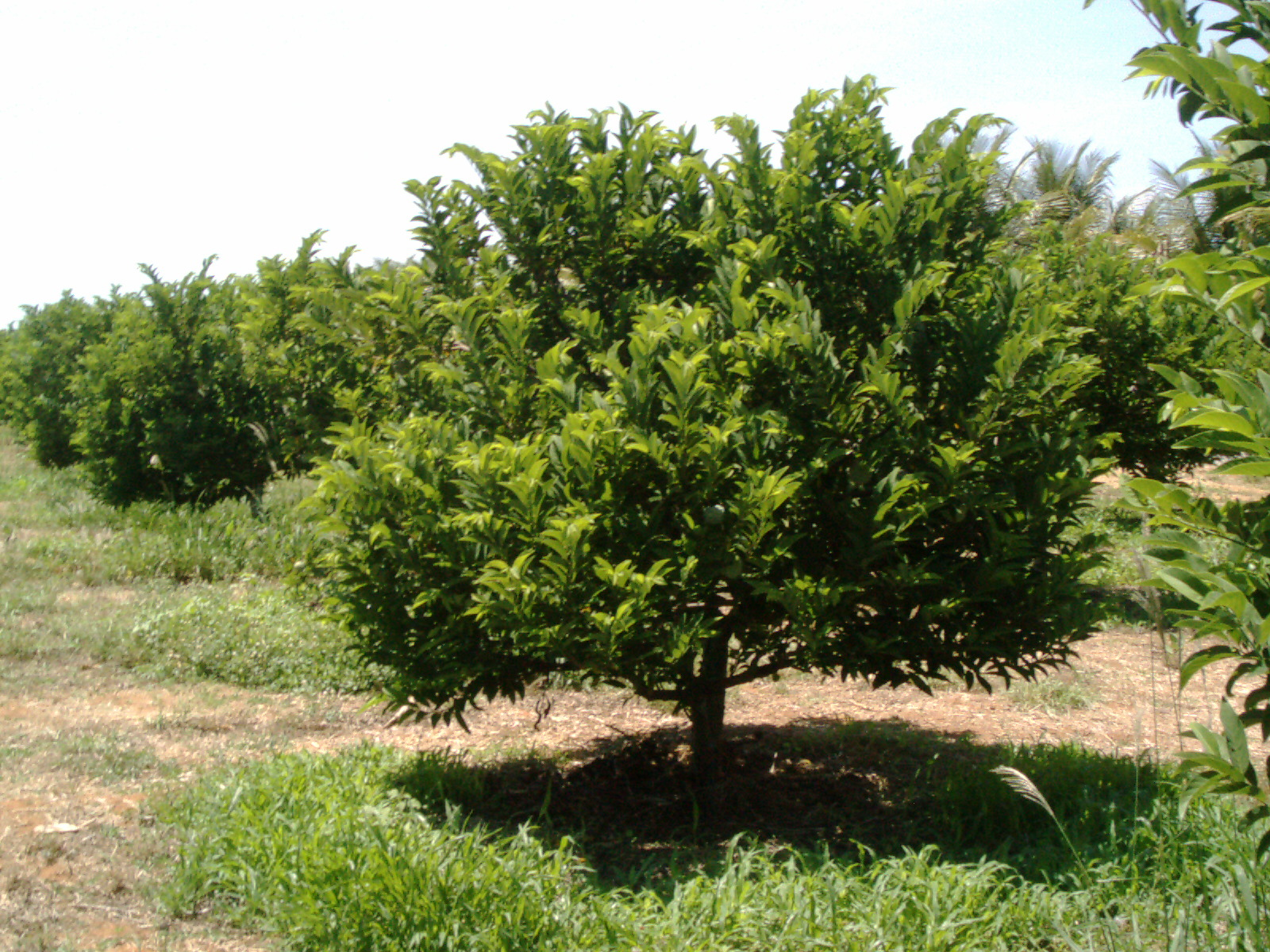
Sugar-apple plantation with an irrigated system, at the banks of the São Francisco River, Bahia

The main fruits grown in Brazil are, in alphabetical order: Abiu, açaí, acerola, alligator-apple, apple, atemoya, bacaba, bacuri, banana, biriba, blueberry, brazil plum, brazil nut, breadfruit, cajá, camu camu, cantaloupe, cashew, citrus (orange, lemon, lime, etc.), coconut, cupuaçu, fig, guava, grapes, jambo, jocote, kiwi, mangaba, mango, mangosteen, mulberry, muruci, nectarine, papaya, passionfruit, patawa, peach, pear, pequi, persimmon, physalis, pineapple, pine nuts, plum, rambutan, raspberry, sapodilla, sapote, sorva, soursop, starfruit, strawberry, tucuma, walnut, and watermelon.

In 2002 the fruit sector grossed 9.6 billion dollars – 18% of Brazil's total. National production is higher than 38 million tons, cultivated on 3.4 million hectares. Between 1990 and 2004 exports grew 183% in value, 277% in quantity and 915% net.

Every ten thousand dollars invested in fruit production generates three direct jobs and two indirect jobs.

Brazil is the world's third largest fruit producer, behind China (157 million tons) and India (with 54 million). Oranges and bananas account for 60% of Brazilian output.

The Brazilian Agency for the Promotion of Exports and Investments (Apex-Brasil), the IBRAF and Carrefour supermarket partnered to develop the Brazilian Fruit Festival, with editions in countries such as Poland and Portugal, from 2004 to 2007.

==== Brazil nut ====
Brazil nut is one of the largest commercialized products in the Amazon Forest. Many Indigenous groups and societies who live along in the Amazon region depend on the income derived from Brazil nuts as they are one commodity that remains harvested directly from the wild.

Studies show that Brazil nuts have been utilized by people for over 11,000 years and that the distribution of the Brazil nut trees that we see today can be attributed to the patterns of pre-Columbian settlements. Through studies on the historical tree growth patterns of Brazil nut trees, it can be observed when the Indigenous populations were forced to retreat from the Brazil nut forests and their management practices. However, in the past few decades an Indigenous group called the Kayapo has begun to sustainably manage a Brazil nut rich forest near the Xingu River, maintaining it as one of their main sources of income.

==== Banana ====
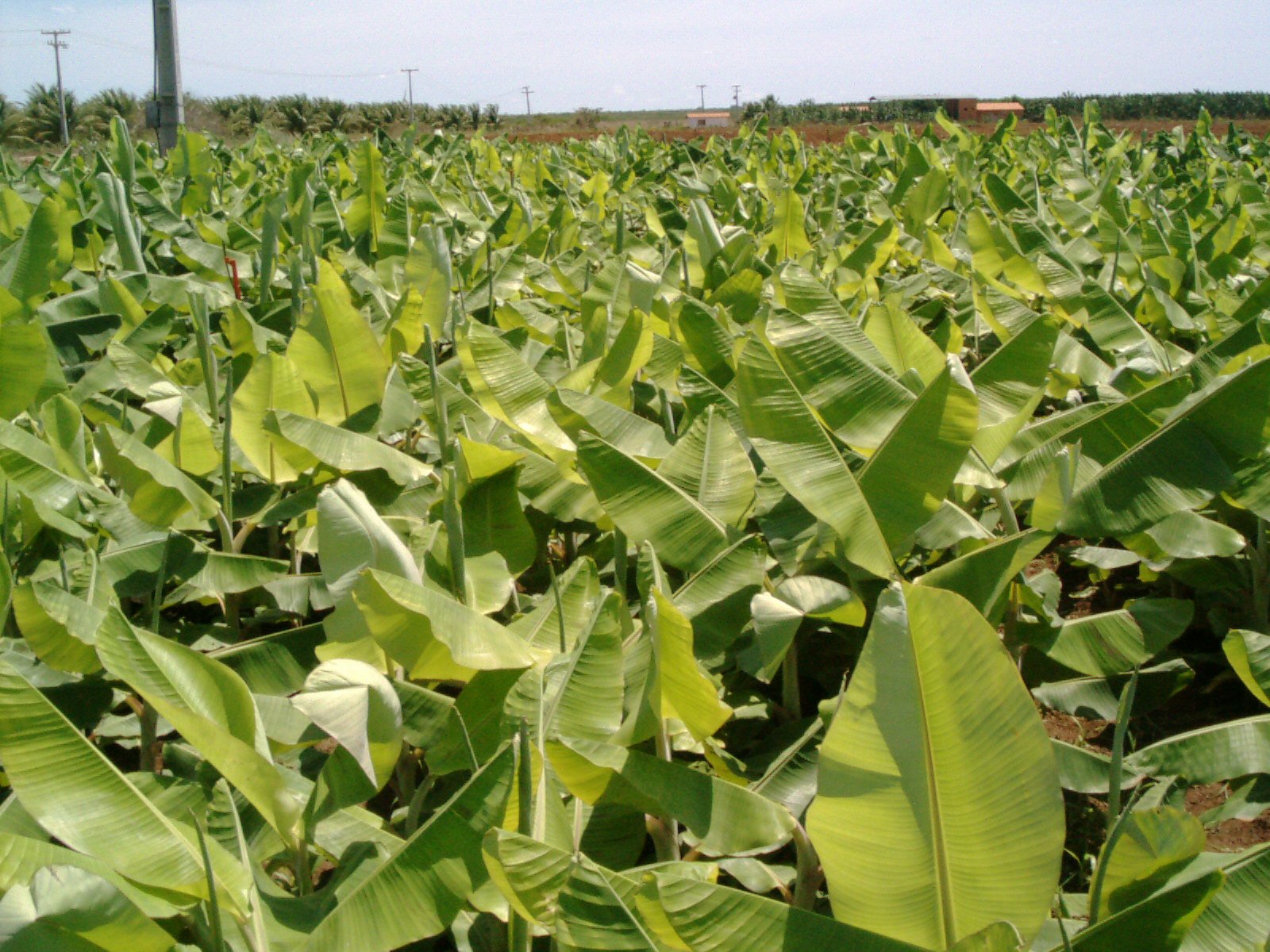
Banana plantation in irrigation project, Rio S. Francisco, Bahia

Banana is produced across the country. It is the second-largest fruit crop. In 2003, 510 thousand hectares were planted, yielding 6.5 million tons, repeated in 2004. In descending order, the largest producers were São Paulo (with one million one hundred seventy-eight thousand tons), Bahia (764 thousand tons) and Pará (697 thousand tons).

In 2018, São Paulo was the biggest productor in Brazil, with 1 million tons. Bahia harvested 825 thousand tons, Minas Gerais 767 thousand tons, Santa Catarina 709 thousand tons and Pernambuco 429 thousand tons. The country's production was 6,752 million tons.

==== Cocoa ====
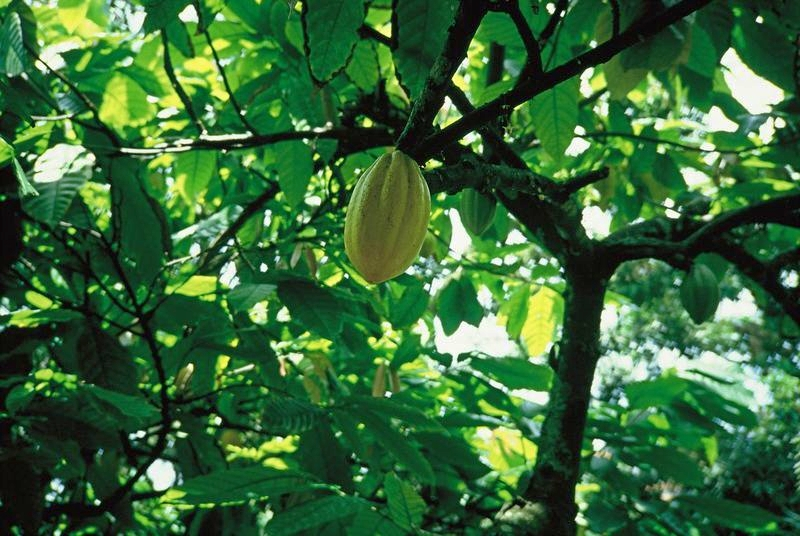
Cocoa plant in Ilheus, Bahia

Cocoa was once one of Brazil's main export crops, particularly for Bahia. Production gradually diminished. In 2002 Bahia accounted for 84% of Brazil's cocoa, according to IBGE, planting more than 548 thousand hectares planted with the crop.

Brazil changed from exporting to importing cocoa in 1992. According to FAO the country, between 1990 and 2003, fell from ninth to seventeenth in the main world producers' ranking.

Bahian cocoa shows how a pest and the lack of plant health care may affect a crop. In this case a disease called witch's broom was directly responsible for falling production, which started in the year 1989. A severe decline endured until 1999, when resistant varieties were introduced. Despite this, in 2007 Bahian production started to decline again, whilst the Paraense raised its share.

Today, Bahia is disputing the leadership of national production with the state of Pará. In 2017 Pará obtained the leadership for the first time. In 2019, people from Pará harvested 135 thousand tons of cocoa, and Bahians harvested 130 thousand tons. Bahia's cocoa area is practically three times larger than that of Pará, but Pará's productivity is practically three times greater. Some factors that explain this are: the crops in Bahia are more extractivist, and those in Pará have a more modern and commercial style, in addition to paraenses using more productive and resistant seeds, and their region providing resistance to witch's broom.

==== Citrus ====
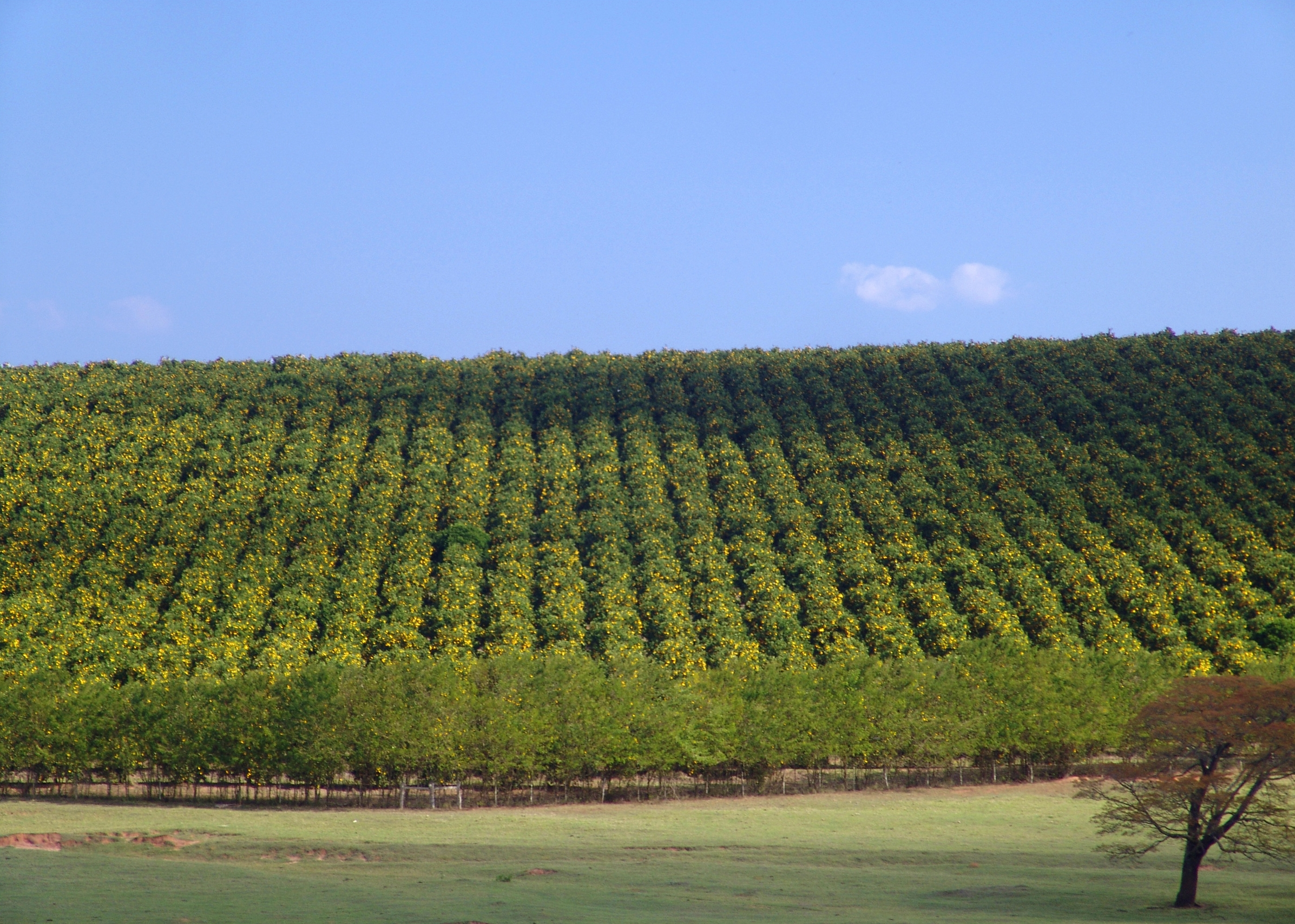
Orange field, in São Paulo

Citrus includes oranges, limes, tangerines, lemons, etc. Oranges are the most relevant in agriculture.

In 2004 Brazil produced 18.3 million tons of oranges, 45% of the fruit harvest.

São Paulo state accounts for 79% of orange production and is the largest producer and exporter of orange juice, responsible for half of global production. 97% is exported.

Brazil and the US are the world's largest citrus producers, with 45% of the total, while South Africa, Spain and Israel compete in oranges and tangerines.

Brazilian orange juice is equivalent to 80% of world exports, the largest market share for any Brazilian agricultural product.

=== Forestry and wood ===
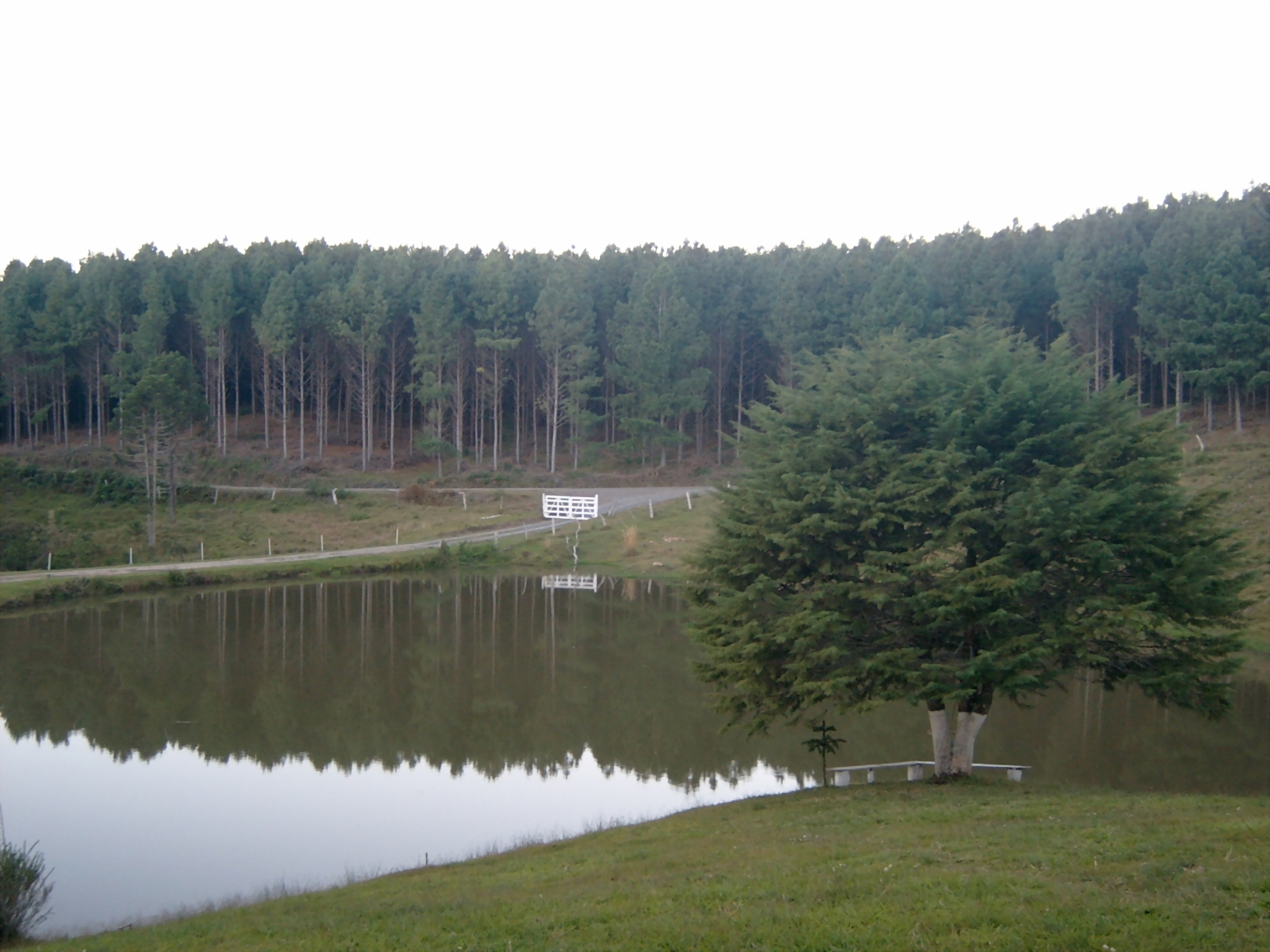
Pine plantation for cellulose production, Bocaina do Sul, Santa Catarina

Commercial forestry produced 65% of Brazilian wood products in 2003, up from 52% the year earlier as it gradually replaced traditional gathering.

Eucalyptus is the most popular species for reforestation. It is harvested for plywood and cellulose production. In 2001 the country cultivated three million hectares with this tree; another 1.8 million hectares were planted with pine, a species better adapted to the climate of the South and Southeast.

Native species have received increasing attention as an alternative to eucalyptus and pine. In 2007, the National Plan of Forestry with Native Species and Agroforestry Systems (PENSAF) was launched, in an integrated effort between the Ministry of the Environment (MMA) and the Ministry of Agriculture, Livestock and Food Supply (MAPA), among others.

In 2003 the country produced 2.149 million tons of wood for charcoal; 75% from Minas Gerais. Charcoal from vegetable gathering added 2.227 million tons, the largest part (35%) from Pará. Firewood production occupied 47.232 million square meters, with Bahia the biggest producer.

Brazil is the seventh largest global producer of cellulose of all kinds, and the largest of short fiber cellulose. In 2005 the country exported 5.2 million tons and produced 6 million, generating revenues of 3.4 billion dollars.

In 2006 the Management of Public Forests Law was enacted. It subsidizes legal wood production to reduce illegal deforestation, and encouraging the timber sector to adopt sustainable practices.

=== Vegetables ===
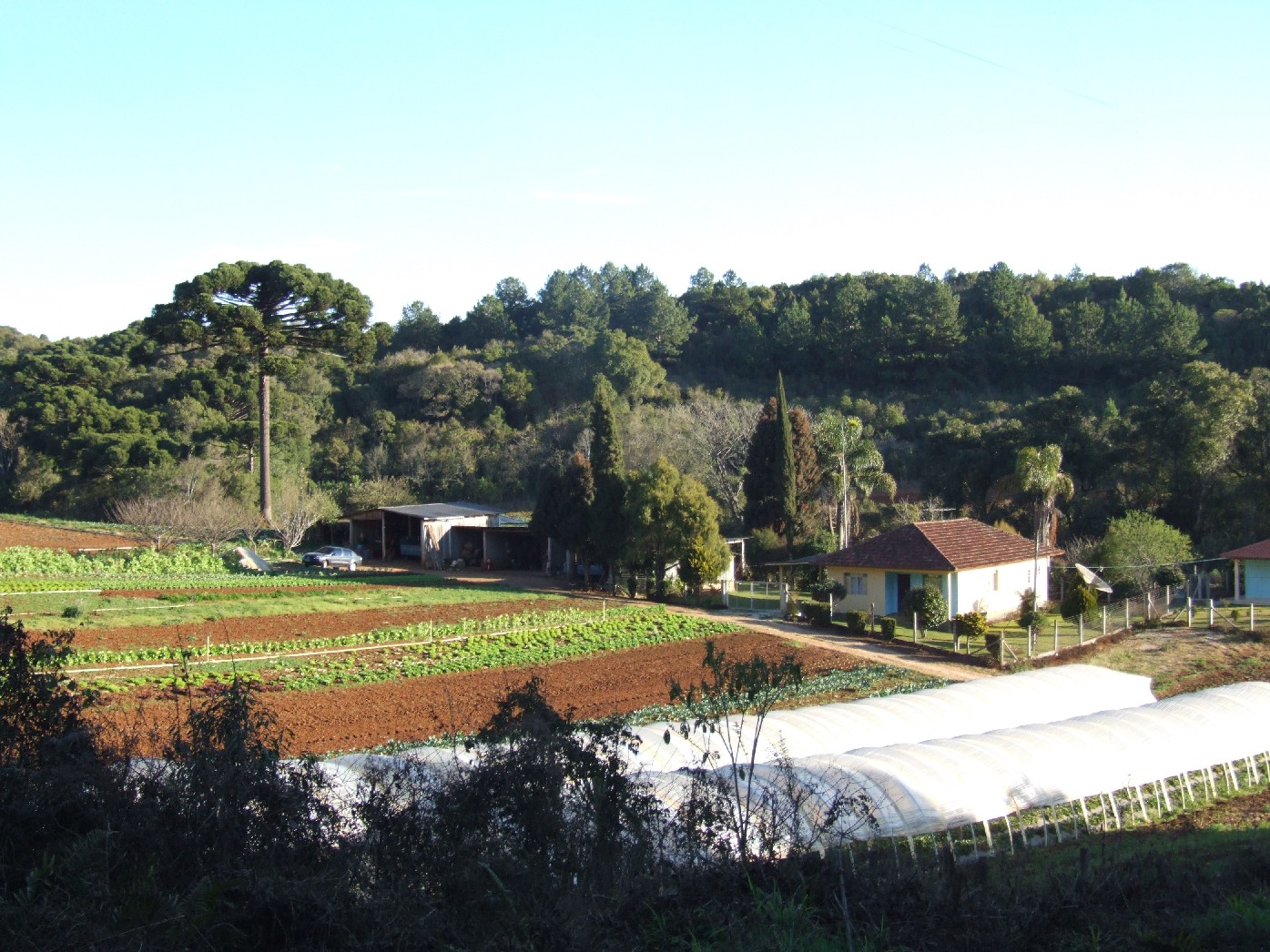
Horticulture in Almirante Tamandaré countryside

Brazilian vegetable production in 2004 was estimated at 11.696 billion Reais. It occupied 176 thousand hectares, yielding 16.86 million tons. The major producing regions were the South and Southeast, with 75% of the total. This sector employs between eight and ten million workers.

The vegetable section of Embrapa, with headquarters in Distrito Federal, was created in 1978 and in 1981 renamed the National Center of Research on Vegetables (CNPH). It occupies 487 ha with laboratories, administrative and support buildings, with 45 ha devoted to experimental vegetable production, of which 7 support organic production.

In 2007 Brazil exported 366,213 tons of vegetable crops, which yielded 240 million dollars. Among these, thirteen thousand tons of potatoes, twenty thousand tons of tomatoes, 37 thousand tons of onions. Other export vegetables included ginger, peas, cucumbers, capsicum, mustard, carrots and garlic.

==== Tomato ====
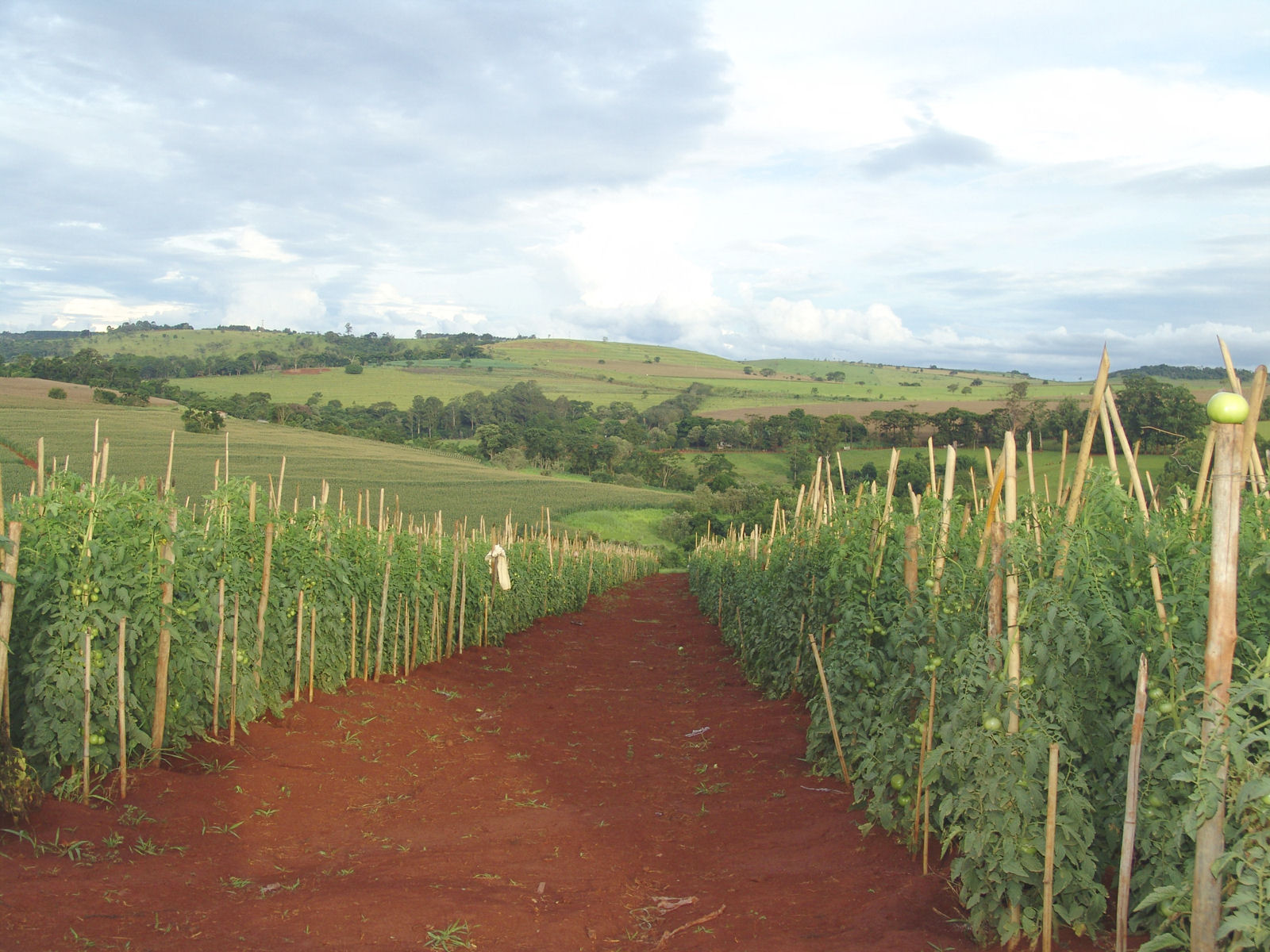
Tomato plantation, Arandu

Brazilian tomato production ranked sixth globally and first in South America in 2000. 1999 output reached a record of 1.29 million tons for tomato pulp.

In 2005, production increased to 3.3 million tons, ranking ninth globally behind China, US, Turkey, Italy, Egypt, India, Spain and Iran. The largest states in 2004 were Goiás (871 thousand tons), São Paulo (749 thousand tons), Minas Gerais (622 thousand), Rio de Janeiro (203 thousand) and Bahia (193 thousand).

Success in Goiás' and Minas Gerais' Cerrado allowed the region to expand from 31% to 84% of production, from 1996 to 2001. The development of localized hybrid varieties raised productivity.

==== Onion ====
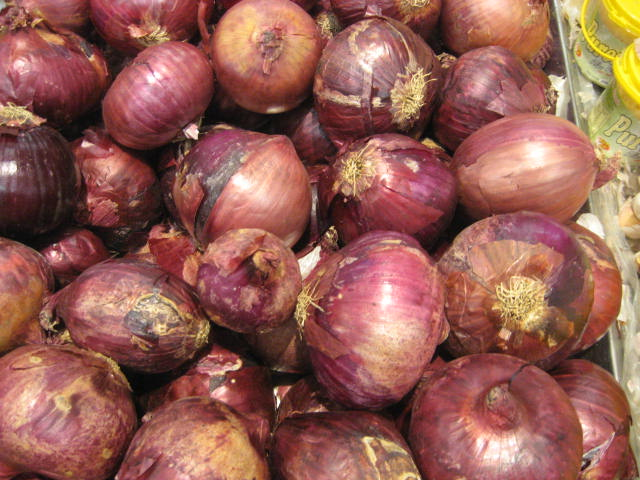
Sample of red onions

Small farmers are responsible for more than half of the country's production.

Juazeiro, in Bahia, and Petrolina, in Pernambuco are neighboring towns, separated by São Francisco River. They have the highest yield, using irrigation to achieve 24 tons per hectare, versus the Brazilian average of seventeen. In 2006, the two cities 200 thousand tons surpassed that of the other states, behind only Santa Catarina (355 thousand tons).

=== Cassava ===
Brazil is the world's second largest cassava producer, at 12.7%. Exports comprise only .5%. Average exports in 2000 and 2001 were thirteen million, one hundred thousand tons, generating revenue above six hundred million dollars.

It is cultivated in all regions and is used for both human and animal consumption. Manioc is farmed for human consumption, including flour and starch. That production chain generates about a million direct jobs, and some ten million jobs overall.

Forecasts for 2002 were for 22.6 million tons on 1.7 million hectares. The largest producers were Pará (17.9%), Bahia (16.7%), Paraná (14.5%), Rio Grande do Sul (5.6%) and Amazonas (4.3%) .

== Controversies ==
=== Land use changes ===
In some areas, such as in the Amazon rainforest, forest is being cleared to make room for soy and palm oil production, and for making grassland, used for grazing cattle.

By 1995, 70% of formerly forested land in the Amazon, and 91% of land deforested since 1970 had been converted to cattle ranching. Much of the remaining deforestation within the Amazon has resulted from farmers clearing land (sometimes using the slash-and-burn method) for small-scale subsistence agriculture or mechanized cropland producing soy, palm, and other crops.

The cattle sector of the Brazilian Amazon, incentivized by the international beef and leather trades, has been responsible for about 80% of all deforestation in the region, or about 14% of the world's total annual deforestation, making it the world's largest single driver of deforestation.

In September 2019, Carlos Nobre, expert on the Amazon and climate change in Brazil, warned that at the current rates of deforestation, we are 20 to 30 years off from reaching a tipping point that could turn big parts of the Amazon forest into a dry savanna, especially in the southern and northern Amazon.

In 2024 for the first time "a drought has covered all the way from the North to the country's Southeast," It is the strongest drought in Brazil, since the beginning of measurement in the 1950s, covering almost 60% of the country territory. The drought is linked to deforestation and climate change. The drought has a serious, mostly negative, impact on the agricultural sector in Brazil, impacting soybeans, maize, beans, sugarcane, coffee, oranges.

In regions such as Ribeirão Preto, many rural farm workers, and small farm owners have had their land dispossessed to make way for Sugarcane monocultures. Fields left fallow, post-sugarcane cultivation are difficult for these landless, rural populations to farm for subsistence, due to nutrients being stripped from the area, as well as depletion of water supply due to industrial sugarcane farming. Many of these settlements in areas that were formerly monocultures, are also surrounded by existing monocultures, creating friction between rural populations, and corporate farming.

Soybean monocultures have also had a significant impact in the Cerrado. Previously a region of high levels of biodiversity, it has been rapidly cleared for industrial farming, losing half of its original 200 million hectares. Soy cultivation also dries streams in the area, and intensifies droughts for local communities. It changes land use, putting traditional farming methods, and indigenous food sources in decline, due to contamination, deforestation and loss of grazing lands. Between 2003 and 2017 13 million hectares of Cerrado was cleared for soy.

=== Slave and child labor ===
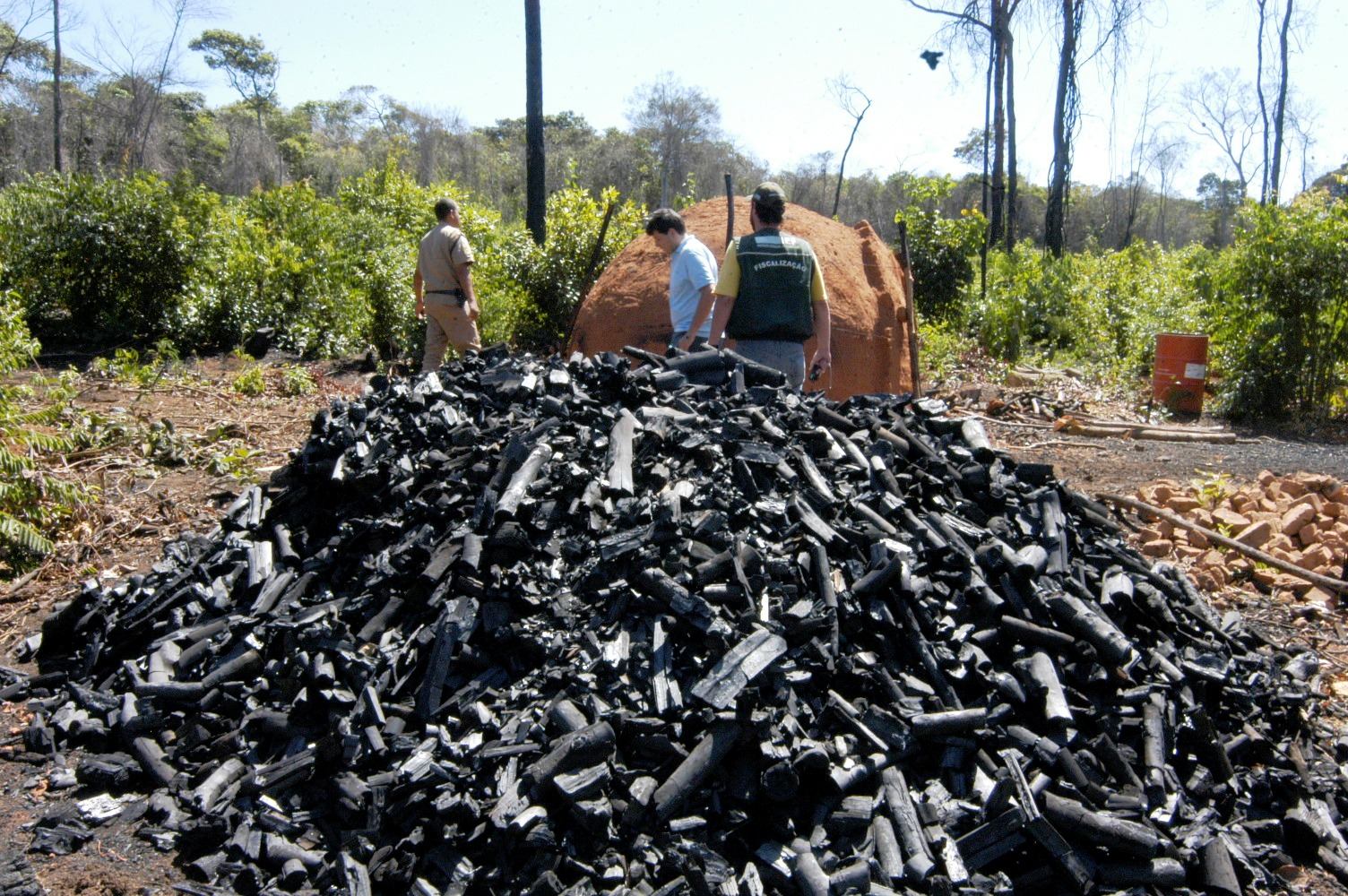
Inspectors from the Ministry of Labor and Federal Police officers at the scene of a clandestine charcoal operation, places where most illegal working situations occur

According to data from the Department of Labor of the United States, twenty-first century Brazil ranks third in occurrences of illegal working arrangements (tied with India and Bangladesh). Eight of thirteen violations were prevalent in agribusiness, especially in livestock, sisal, sugar cane, rice, tobacco and charcoal. Despite its position, the country's performance was praised, and between 1995 and 2009 approximately 35,000 workers were freed from degrading conditions.

The International Labour Organization (ILO) recognized the Brazilian effort to fight such practices, which focus on preventing/correcting misbehavior via a system of fines.

Among the causes of illegal working arrangements were poverty and misinformation.

A Constitutional Amendment Proposal (PEC), would compensate landowners for losses resulting from ending such practices.

In 2014 however, the Bureau of International Labor Affairs issued a List of Goods Produced by Child Labor or Forced Labor where Brazil was classified as one of the 74 countries involved in child labor and forced labor practices. The report lists 16 products including cotton, cashews, pineapples, rice and sugarcane the production of which still employs children.

==== Soil erosion ====
A large part of the Southeast and Northeast region of the country is made up of granitic and gneiss rock formations, covered by a layer of regolith, very susceptible to soil erosion and gully formation. Bertoni and Neto point out this condition as one of Brazil's highest environmental dangers, and a large part of them result from human activities.

Soil erosion removes nutrients and causes the loss of structure, texture and the decrease of infiltration rates and water retention.

Plowing and herbicides to control undesirable weeds leave the soil exposed and susceptible to erosion – either by loss of topsoil (which is richer in nutrients), or from gullies. The lost soil fills rivers and reservoirs with silt. One solution is no-till farming, a practice not in wide use.

Soil degradation is commonly associated with Sugarcane fields, comparatively higher than pastures and forests. Estimated erosion rates are up to 30 Mg ha per year.

==== Pesticide ====
The world's four thousand agrochemicals are produced in about 15,000 different formulations, 8,000 of which are licensed in Brazil. They include insecticides, fungicides, herbicides, vermifuges, and also solvents and sanitizers. They are widely used to protect crops from pests, disease and invading species. Indiscriminate use causes unnecessary accumulation of those substances in the soil, water (springs, groundwater, reservoirs) and air.

Brazil uses an average of 3.2 kg of agrochemicals per hectare – ranking tenth globally, in some studies, and fifth, in others. São Paulo state is Brazil's largest user, and the largest producer, comprising 80% of the total. Mitigation techniques include farmer education, and the development of resistant species, better farming techniques, biological pest control, among others.

In 2007 tomatoes, lettuce and strawberries showed the highest rates of contamination by agrochemicals. Farmer awareness is low and few comply with rules on the use of these substances, such as Individual Protection Equipment (EPI).

According to information from Anvisa, Brazilian farming uses at least ten types of agrochemicals prohibited in other markets, such as the European Union and the US. In September 2019, Brazil's Agriculture Ministry approved 63 pesticides for commercial use as the government seeks to decrease a backlog of applications for new agricultural chemicals. According to an investigation by Unearthed, more than 1,200 pesticides and weedkillers, including 193 containing chemicals banned in the EU, have been registered in Brazil between 2016 and 2019.

==== Genetically modified crops ====
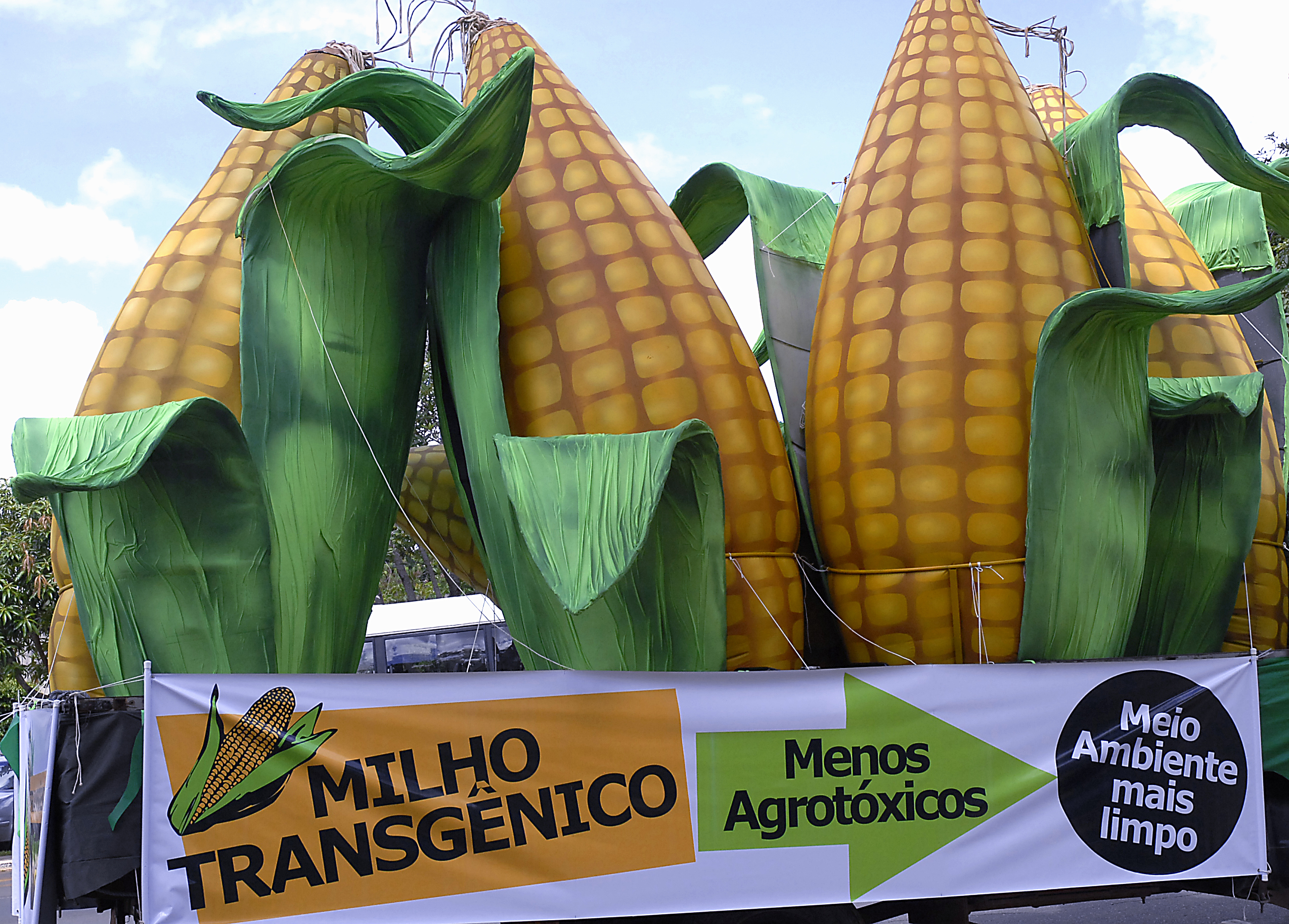
Brasilia, 2007: Protesters call for liberation from transgenic maize.

The country is the third largest user in the world in growing genetically modified crops. The main commodities using this biotechnology are soy, cotton and, since 2008, maize.

Several national and international NGOs, such as Greenpeace, MST or Contag, are opposed to the practice. Criticisms include market loss, negative environmental impacts and dominance by large businesses. Entities linked to agribusiness, however, counter with the results of studies carried out by the Brazilian Association of Seeds and Saplings (Abrasem) in 2007 and 2008, affirming "social-environmental advantages observed in the other countries which have adopted agricultural biotechnology far longer".

Federal Justice decided that foods containing more than 1 percent of modified genes must be labeled to inform consumers.

===== Impact on genetic diversity =====
The Amazon rainforest is a source of essential genes for crops, livestock, pollination, biological control, cleaning water and soil regeneration.

== See also ==
- Animal husbandry in Brazil
- List of countries by sugarcane production
- List of countries by soybean production
- List of countries by coffee production
- List of countries by citrus production
- List of countries by maize production
- List of countries by papaya production
- List of countries by pineapple production
- List of countries by tobacco production
- List of countries by cotton production
- List of countries by cassava production
- List of countries by coconut production
- List of countries by lemon production
- List of countries by cacao production
- List of countries by avocado production
- List of countries by rice production
- List of countries by tomato production
- List of countries by grape production
- List of countries by apple production
- List of countries by garlic production
- List of countries by potato production
- International wheat production statistics
- List of countries by barley production
