= Seringueira Extractive Reserve =

Protected area in Brazil

- Reserva Extrativista Seringueira
- IUCN category VI (protected area with sustainable use of natural resources)
- Location within Brazil
- Nearest city: Machadinho d'Oeste, Rondônia
- Coordinates: 9°33′22″S 62°02′28″W
- Area: 537 hectares (1,330 acres)
- Designation: Extractive reserve
- Created: 4 September 1995
- Administrator: Secretaria de Estado do Desenvolvimento Ambiental (Rondônia)

Seringueira Extractive Reserve (Portuguese: Reserva Extrativista Seringueira is an extractive reserve in the state of Rondônia, Brazil.

== Location ==
The Seringueira Extractive Reserve (Note: Seringueira means "rubber tree") is in the municipality of Vale do Anari, Rondônia, to the south of Machadinho d'Oeste, in land that has been largely deforested. It has an area of 537 hectares (1,330 acres). The Machadinho River runs along the west of the reserve. The reserve is one of 15 small extractive reserves in the municipalities of Machadinho d'Oeste, Cujubim and Vale do Anari that originate in reservation blocks from the Machadinho and Cujubim colonization projects, cover the former Santo Antônio, São Paulo and São Gonçalo rubber plantations, and were created in the 1980s. The main product is rubber, as well as copaiba nuts and oil.

== Administration ==
The Seringueira Extractive Reserve was created by Rondônia state decree 7.108 on 4 September 1995. It was created as a territorial space for sustainable use and conservation of renewable natural resources by the agro-extractive population. The reserve was created by Rondônia governor Valdir Raupp in response to illegal and predatory pressure on forest areas occupied by traditional populations, causing irreversible loss of plant resources and wildlife and exacerbating social conflicts.

The reserve is the responsibility of the Rondônia Secretariat of State for the Environment (SEDAM/RO - Secretaria de Estado do Meio Ambiente). Seringueira and the other 14 reserves are run by the Association of Machadinho Rubber Tappers. They all have a utilisation plan, and there are no land disputes.

== Sources ==
- RESEX Seringueira (in Portuguese), ISA: Instituto Socioambiental
- "RESEX Seringueira", Protected Areas Observatory, WWF-Brasil
- Valdir Raupp de Matos (4 September 1995), Decreto n.º 7.108 de 04 de Setembro de 1995 (PDF) (in Portuguese)
