= Aquariquara Extractive Reserve =

Extractive reserve in the state of Rondônia, Brazil

- Reserva Extrativista Aquariquara
- IUCN category VI (protected area with sustainable use of natural resources)
- Machadinho Rubber Tappers reserves: 9. Aquariquara

- Location within Brazil
- Nearest city: Vale do Anari, Rondônia
- Coordinates: 9.755649°S 62.067701°W
- Area: 18,100 hectares (45,000 acres)
- Designation: Extractive reserve
- Created: 4 September 1995
- Administrator: Secretaria de Estado do Desenvolvimento Ambiental (RO)

Aquariquara Extractive Reserve (Portuguese: Reserva Extrativista Aquariquara) is an extractive reserve in the state of Rondônia, Brazil. The main source of income for the residents is sale of latex (rubber) extracted using traditional methods. Lumber is also extracted on a sustainable basis, but many residents receive little or no compensation. Given the very low income from extraction, residents may turn to illegal logging, farming and livestock husbandry.

== Location ==
Aquariquara Extractive Reserve is in the municipality of Vale do Anari. It has an area of 18,100 hectares (45,000 acres). The reserve is in the basin of the Ji-paraná River, on the left bank of the Machadinho River sub-basin. The terrain is undulating.

Average annual rainfall ranges from 1,600 to 2,300 millimetres (63 to 91 in). The driest months are June, July and August, with less than 50 millimetres (2.0 in) of rain. Temperatures range from 19 to 33 °C (66 to 91 °F) with an average of 25 to 26 °C (77 to 79 °F). Vegetation includes dense rainforest of the low hills of the southern Amazon, and open rainforest. As of 2002 the reserve had 97.94% of its original forest coverage.

== History ==
Aquariquara Extractive Reserve is one of 15 small extractive reserves in the municipalities of Machadinho d'Oeste, Cujubim and Vale do Anari, remnants of the former Seringal Santo Antônio, Seringal São Paulo and Seringal São Gonçalo rubber extraction concessions. They are administered by the Association of Machadinho Rubber Tappers.

On 18 November 1991 the Aquariquara Forest Reserve was closed to settlement, deforestation, professional fishing, logging, mining and other activities that could compromise sustainable use other than the activities of small farmers, rubber tappers and fisherfolk. Aquariquara Extractive Reserve was created by state decree 7.106 of 4 September 1995 with an area of 18,100 hectares (45,000 acres). The purpose was to provide an area for sustainable use and conservation of natural resources by the agro-extractive population. The decree recognised that the great pressures of predatory activities on areas occupied by the traditional people of the forest were causing irreversible loss of plant and wildlife resources, and were exacerbating social conflicts and degrading the quality of life of the forest residents.

The reserve created a forest management plan, and began exploiting wood in 1998. Some of the leaders and residents have sold abandoned lots to businesses and farmers from other regions. A 2011 survey of key people involved with the reserve showed that the extractive community did not perceive the significant potential for income generation of sustainable extraction as opposed to traditional methods.

In April 2015 members of the association met with the Committee on Environment and Sustainable Development of the state legislature. The committee was told that the members lived in a climate of terrorism and had been receiving death threats. 16 homicides had been recorded in the past ten years. The protected areas were being laid waste with no effort being made by the state government to protect them.

== Economy ==
The main resource extracted from the forest is rubber, as well as nuts and copaiba oil. In 1994 the Aquariquara Extractive Reserve had 181 residents. According to a 2000 survey there were 91 residents in 27 placements. As of 2011 there were 47 families in 27 placements in the reserve.

A 1999 state government report said there was considerable and diversified agricultural production, especially coffee, in Aquariquara. A project to manufacture and market babaçu (Attalea speciosa) flour had been started in 1998, with considerable success, with the output sold to schools and stores in Machadinho.

However, as of 2011 activities other than latex collection, such as acai production and seed collection, were negligible. Extraction used traditional methods, involving walking long distances to collect the latex. Although there are wide variations, on average each family produced 3,136 kilograms (6,914 lb) of latex per year. The Rubber Tappers Association buys this output for R$2.00 per kilo. (Note: The "Minimum Price" policy guarantees that latex can be sold at R$3.50 per kilo, but only up to 900 kilograms (2,000 lb) per person per year. Excess production is sold at the much lower market price.) Due to the large effort and low economic value of sustainable rubber extraction, residents turn to other activities such as logging, agriculture and raising livestock.

Forest management began in the reserve around 2001, covering about half the area of the reserve. The area is divided into 500 hectares (1,200 acres) lots, each explored for one year, giving a predicted 20-year cycle. Residents are involved in the forest inventory, identifying trees of each species to be harvested, and help open and demarcate the tracks for forestry. They also supervise the lumber operation and record the amount of wood extracted. An estimate of forestry income payable gave R$8,809 per family in 2010. The actual amount received by families for 2009 varied from zero to R$1,000. However, some residents with jobs with the lumber companies received as much as R$7,000. The method of allocating profits is opaque, and there is little government supervision.

== Sources ==
- Igor Cruz (2 April 2015), Associação denuncia devastação de reservas em Machadinho (in Portuguese), Rondônia Legislative Assembly
- RESEX Aquariquara (in Portuguese), ISA: Instituto Socioambiental
- Silva Moreira, Rodrigo César; Silva Müller, Carlos André da (May–August 2011), "A Produção Extrativista e o Manejo Florestal na Reserva Extrativista Aquariquara no estado de Rondônia", Revista de Administração e Negócios da Amazônia (in Portuguese), 3 (2)
- Valdir Raupp de Matos (4 September 1995), Decreto n.º 7.106 de 04 de Setembro de 1995 (PDF)
