= Pracuúba River =

- Location within Brazil

Location
- Country: Brazil
- State: Pará

Physical characteristics
- Mouth
  - location: Pará River
  - coordinates: 1.521124°S 49.509464°W
- Basin size: 930 km^{2} (360 sq mi)

Basin features
- Tributaries
  - left: Guajará River
  - right: Frechal River

The Pracuúba River (Portuguese: Rio Pracuúba) is a river of Marajó, which itself is an island in the Amazon Delta. It is located in the state Pará in northern Brazil.

== Course ==
The Pracuúba has its source in the central forests on the island Marajó. It flows south-east, touching the municipalities of Muaná, São Sebastião da Boa Vista, Breves and Curralinho. Before entering the Pará River, it is joined by the Marituba River and the Pracuuba-Mirim River, forming an intricate delta with many islands. The main ones are called Ilha do Teso, Tucupi Island, Santo Antônio Island, Coroca Island and Chaves Island. The estuary covers 42 kilometres (26 mi) and contains many rubber trees.

The river runs through part of the 194,868 hectares (481,530 acres) Terra Grande-Pracuúba Extractive Reserve, a sustainable use conservation unit created in 2006. Access to the Pracuúba and the nearby Canaticu River is difficult during the summer dry season. The communities on these rivers have an açaí palm crop that ripens in the winter, between seasons in other areas, which therefore commands a high price.

== See also ==
- List of rivers of Pará

== Sources ==
- RESEX Terra Grande-Pracuúba (in Portuguese), ISA: Instituto Socioambiental
- Unidade de Conservação: Reserva Extrativista Terra Grande-Pracuúba (in Portuguese), MMA: Ministério do Meio Ambiente
