= Tavares River =

Coordinates: 27.655°S 48.507°W

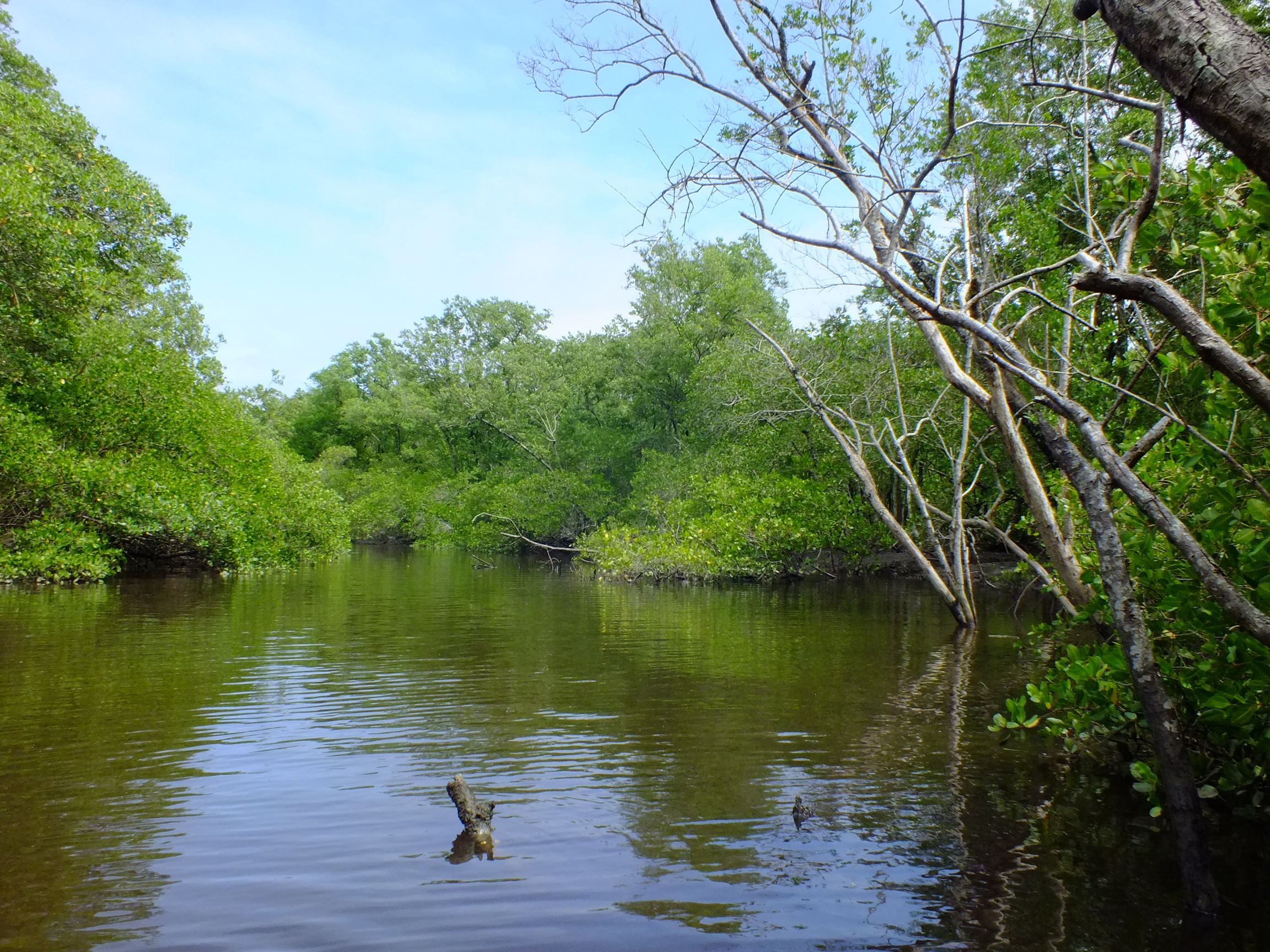

Location
- Country: Brazil

Physical characteristics
- Source
  - location: Florianópolis, Santa Catarina state
- Mouth
  - location: South Bay

The Tavares River or Rio Tavares is a river of Florianópolis, capital of Santa Catarina state in southeastern Brazil.

Rio Tavares is also the name of a neighborhood in the city which is cut by the river.

== Biolife ==
Part of the Pirajubaé Marine Extractive Reserve since 20 May 1992, it holds various species of pink (Farfantepenaeus brasiliensis) and white (Litopenaeus schmitti) shrimps in the mangroves.

The river holds the Brazilian Mullets (Mugil brasiliensis), Silver Mullets (Mugil curema), crabs, catfishes and other species.

The mangroves near Rio Tavares are also used as shelters for several seabirds species and migratory birds.

== See also ==
- List of rivers of Santa Catarina
- (pt) Marine Extractive Reserve of Pirajubaé
