= Canaticu River =

River in Brazil

- Location within Brazil
- Native name: Rio Canaticu (Portuguese)

Location
- Country: Brazil
- State: Pará

Physical characteristics
- Mouth
  - location: Pará River
  - coordinates: 1.779039°S 49.734173°W
- Basin size: 1,538 km^{2} (594 sq mi)

Basin features
- Tributaries
  - right: Igarapé Vaião; Igarapé Puru-puru

The Canaticu River (Portuguese: Rio Canaticu) is a river of Marajó, which itself is an island in the Amazon Delta. It is located in the state Pará in northern Brazil, and is a tributary to the Pará River.

== Course ==
The Canaticu has its source in the flooded igapó forests that are located to the south of the Anajás River. It runs in a southerly direction, forming the division between the municipalities São Sebastião da Boa Vista and Curralinho. It is navigable for most of its length. It enters the Pará River close to the town of Curralinho. Opposite its mouth lies Inajatuba Island.

The river runs through part of the 194,868 hectares (481,530 acres) Terra Grande-Pracuúba Extractive Reserve, a sustainable use conservation unit created in 2006. Access to the Canaticu and the nearby Pracuúba River is difficult during the summer dry season. The communities on these rivers have an açaí palm crop that ripens in the winter, between seasons in other areas, which therefore commands a high price.

== See also ==
- List of rivers of Pará

== Sources ==
- RESEX Terra Grande-Pracuúba (in Portuguese), ISA: Instituto Socioambiental
- Unidade de Conservação: Reserva Extrativista Terra Grande-Pracuúba (in Portuguese), MMA: Ministério do Meio Ambiente
