= Massaranduba Extractive Reserve =

Extractive reserve in the state of Rondônia, Brazil

- IUCN category VI (protected area with sustainable use of natural resources)
- Location within Brazil
- Nearest city: Machadinho d'Oeste, Rondônia
- Coordinates: 9°29′59″S 61°55′36″W
- Area: 5,566 hectares (13,750 acres)
- Designation: Extractive reserve
- Created: 4 September 1995
- Administrator: Secretaria de Estado do Desenvolvimento Ambiental (RO)

Massaranduba Extractive Reserve (Portuguese: Reserva Extrativista Massaranduba) is an extractive reserve in the state of Rondônia, Brazil.

== Location ==
Machadinho Rubber Tappers reserves: 15. Massaranduba

Massaranduba Extractive Reserve is in the municipality of Machadinho d'Oeste, Rondônia. It has an area of 5,566 hectares (13,750 acres). According to an NGO in 1994 there were only five inhabitants and 99.48% of the original vegetation coverage remained. The main threat was illegal removal of timber.

== Economy ==
Massaranduba Extractive Reserve is one of 15 small extractive reserves in the municipalities of Machadinho d'Oeste, Cujubim and Vale do Anari, remnants of the former Seringal Santo Antônio, Seringal São Paulo and Seringal São Gonçalo rubber extraction concessions. They are administered by the Association of Machadinho Rubber Tappers. The main resource extracted from the forest is rubber, as well as nuts and copaiba oil.

== History ==
On 18 November 1991 the Massaranduba Forest Reserve was closed to settlement, deforestation, professional fishing, logging, mining and other activities that could compromise sustainable use other than the activities of small farmers, rubber tappers and fisherfolk. Massaranduba Extractive Reserve was created by state decree 7.103 of 4 September 1995 with an area of 5,566 hectares (13,750 acres). The purpose was to provide an area for sustainable use and conservation of natural resources by the agro-extractive population.

== Sources ==
- RESEX Massaranduba (in Portuguese), ISA: Instituto Socioambiental
