= Pirajubaé Marine Extractive Reserve =

Protected area in Brazil

- Reserva Extrativista Marinha do Pirajubaé
- IUCN category VI (protected area with sustainable use of natural resources)
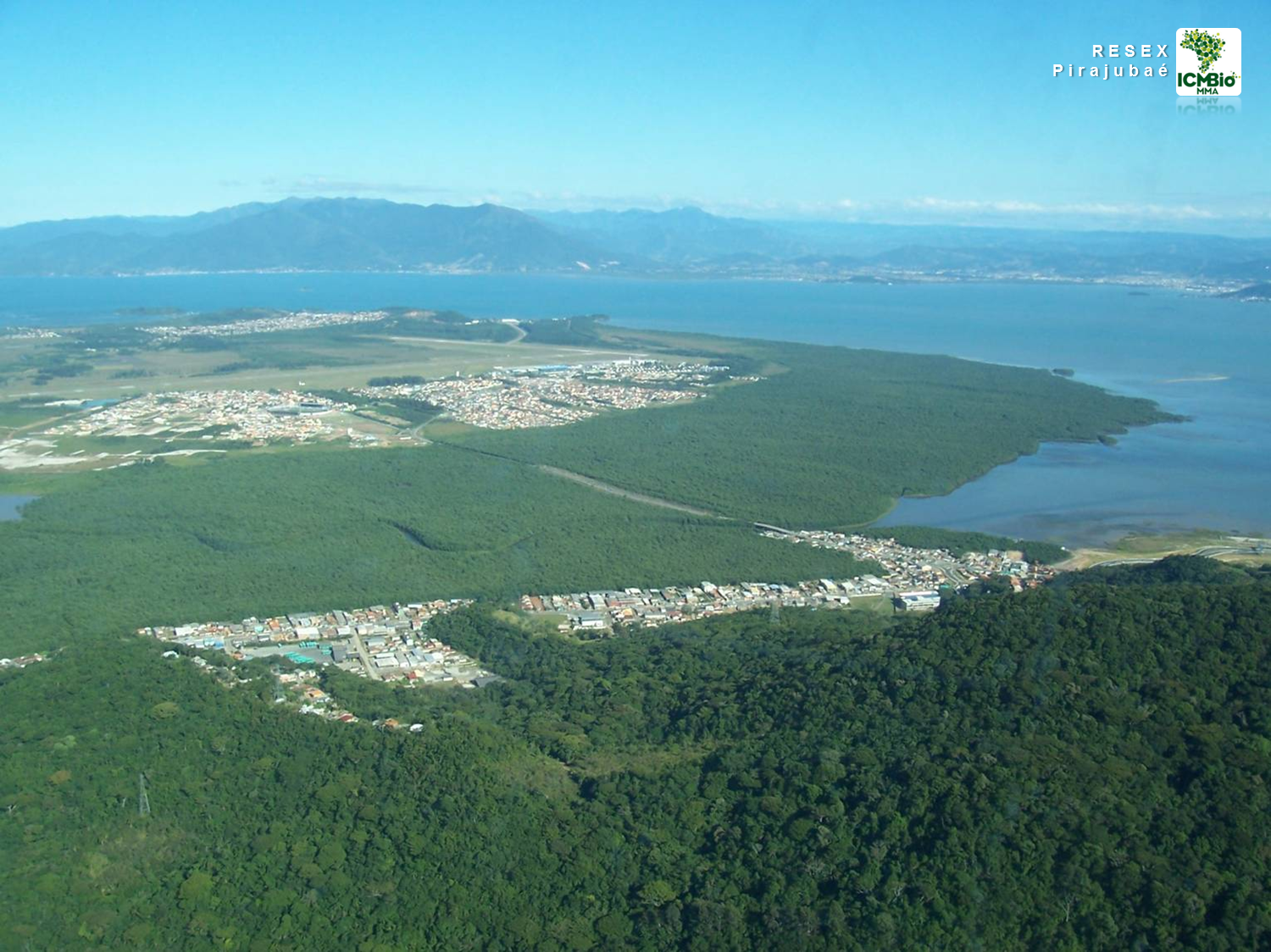
- View from the air

- Location within Brazil
- Nearest city: Florianópolis, Santa Catarina Brazil
- Coordinates: 27°39′05″S 48°31′42″W
- Area: 1,712 hectares (4,230 acres)
- Designation: Extractive reserve
- Created: 20 May 1992
- Administrator: ICMBio

Pirajubaé Marine Extractive Reserve (Portuguese: Reserva Extrativista Marinha do Pirajubaé) is an extractive reserve in the state of Santa Catarina, Brazil, created in 1993. The purpose was to support sustainable harvesting of shellfish from a shoal in the south bay of the Santa Caterina Island. In recent years, due to various natural and human causes including dredging and over-fishing, the catch has declined steeply. As of early 2016 just three families continued traditional extraction of the shellfish.

== Location ==
The Pirajubaé Marine Extractive Reserve covers an area of 1,712 hectares (4,230 acres) of marine biome within the municipality of Florianópolis, Santa Catarina. It is located in the urban area of Santa Catarina Island, and includes marine and mangrove ecosystems. The Tavares River flows into the south bay through a wide estuary that contains the best-preserved mangroves of the island.

== Environment ==
The climate is humid subtropical with an average temperature of 20 °C (68 °F). The mangrove vegetation includes characteristic flora such as Spartina alterniflora, Avicennia schaueriana, Laguncularia racemosa and Rhizophora mangle. Fauna include the shellfish Anomalocardia brasiliana as well as the shrimps Penaeus paulensis, Penaeus brasiliensis and Penaeus schimitti and the fish Mugil brasiliensis and Mugil curema. There are various other types of molluscs and fish, and the mangroves provide shelter to marine and migratory birds.

The main resource exploited by the traditional populations is the chumbinho (Anomalocardia brasiliensis), small bivalves that are found in the muddy and sandy banks of the south bay of the island. This shellfish was a stable source of income for 100 families of traditional fishers.

== Conservation ==
In 1989 fifteen families on the Pirajubaé coast initiated a project to implement a marine farm for berbigão (Anomalocardia brasiliana) in the Tipitinga shallows in front of the mangroves of the Tavares the Brazilian Institute of Environment and Renewable Natural Resources (IBAMA) and the National Center for Research and Conservation of Sociobiodiversity Associated with Traditional Peoples and Communities (CNPT) participated with the local fishers in forming the Pirajubaé Extractive Reserve Association (Associação da Reserva Extrativista do Pirajubaé). The Pirajubaé Marine Extractive Reserve was created by decree 533 of 20 May 1992 and is administered by the Chico Mendes Institute for Biodiversity Conservation.

The reserve was created with a total area of 1,444 hectares (3,570 acres) of which 740 hectares (1,800 acres) was the Tavares River mangroves and the other 740 hectares (1,800 acres) was the Tiptinga shoal. Pirajubaé was the first marine extractive reserve created in Brazil. It protects the livelihood and culture of the traditional extractive population and ensures sustainable use of the natural resources.

The Federal Institute of Santa Caterina has launched a program to encourage eco-tourism in the reserve, training professional guides to explain the environmental and cultural aspects of the natural tourist attractions of the island. In 2012, with the support of ICMBio, they created a bi-lingual short documentary on the history of the reserve and activities of the fishing community.

In early 2015 there were still 23 families engaged in harvesting the shellfish, but by February 2016 only three were still active due to a significant decline in the catch. Threats to the molluscs include urban pressure, extreme weather events, over-fishing, capture of juvenile individuals and dredging of the banks for the construction of South Expressway.

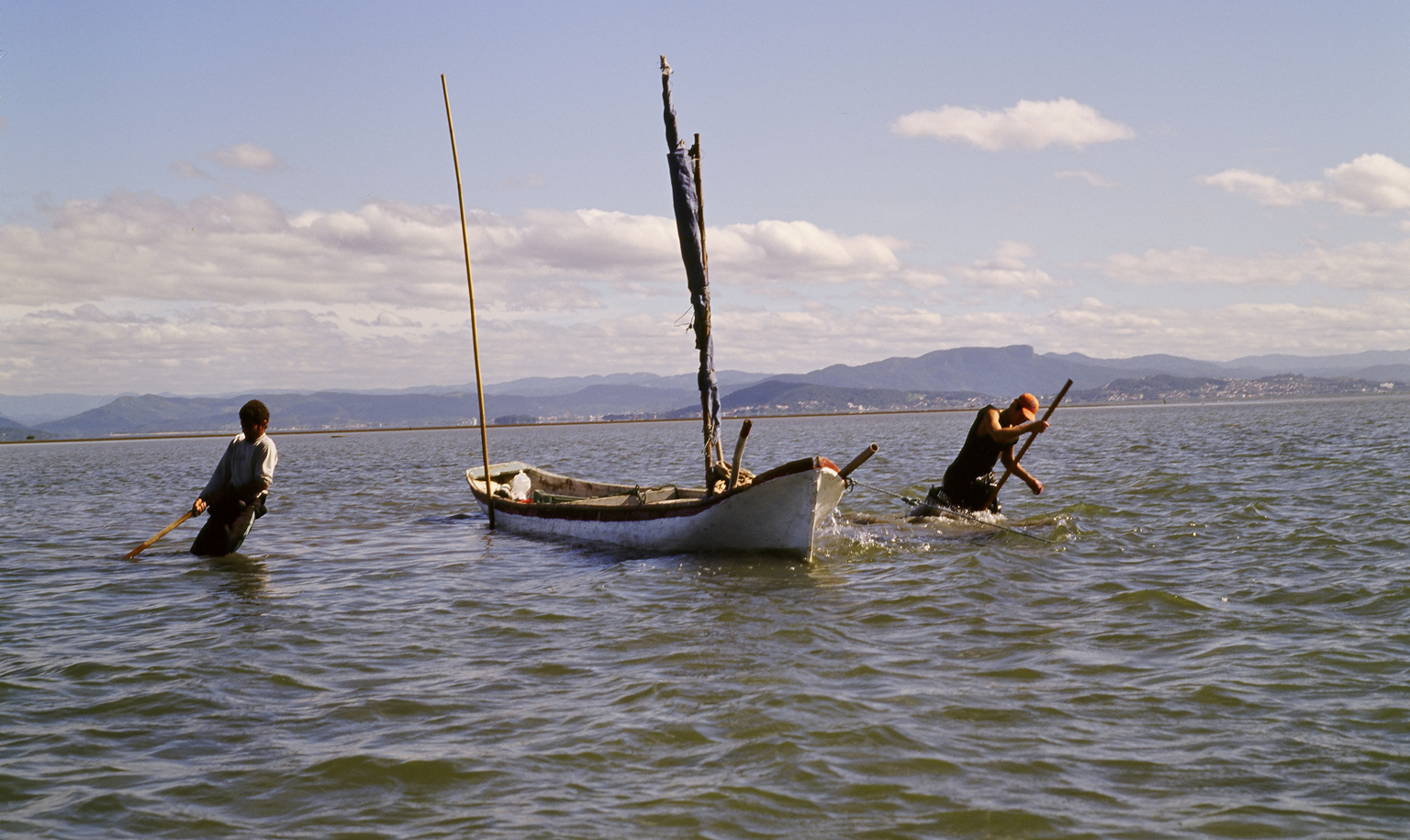
Harvesters

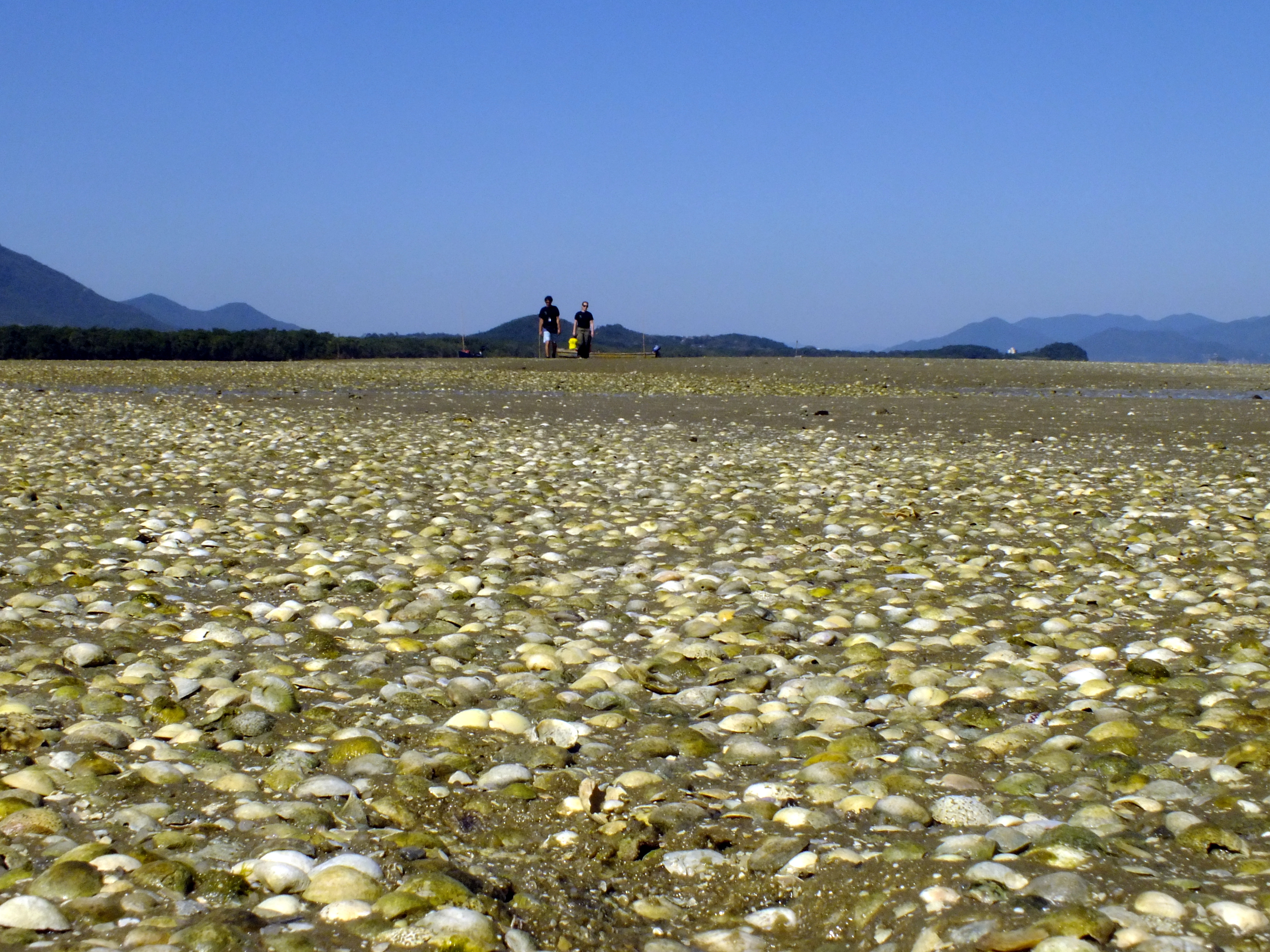
Sandbank

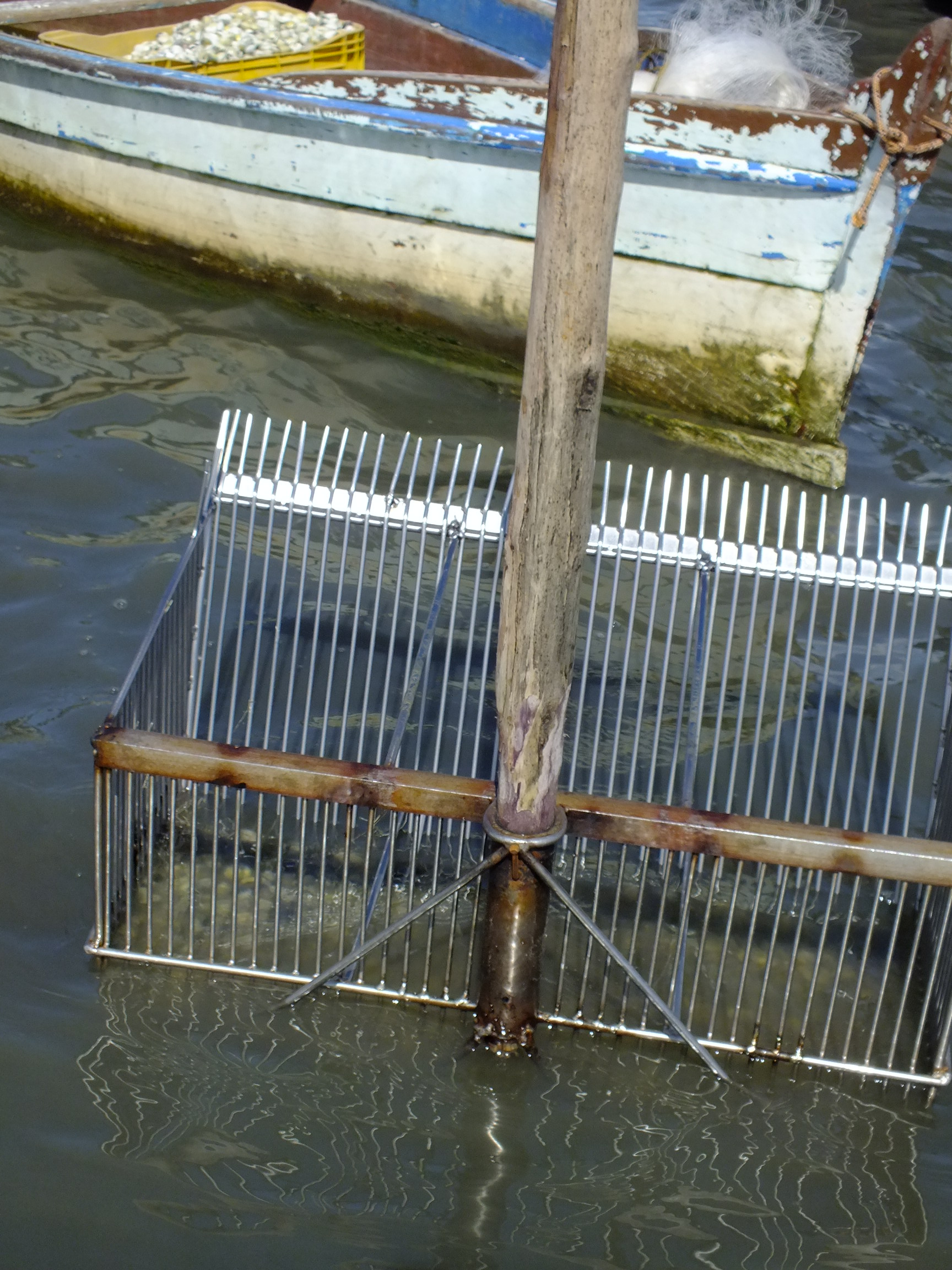
Storage

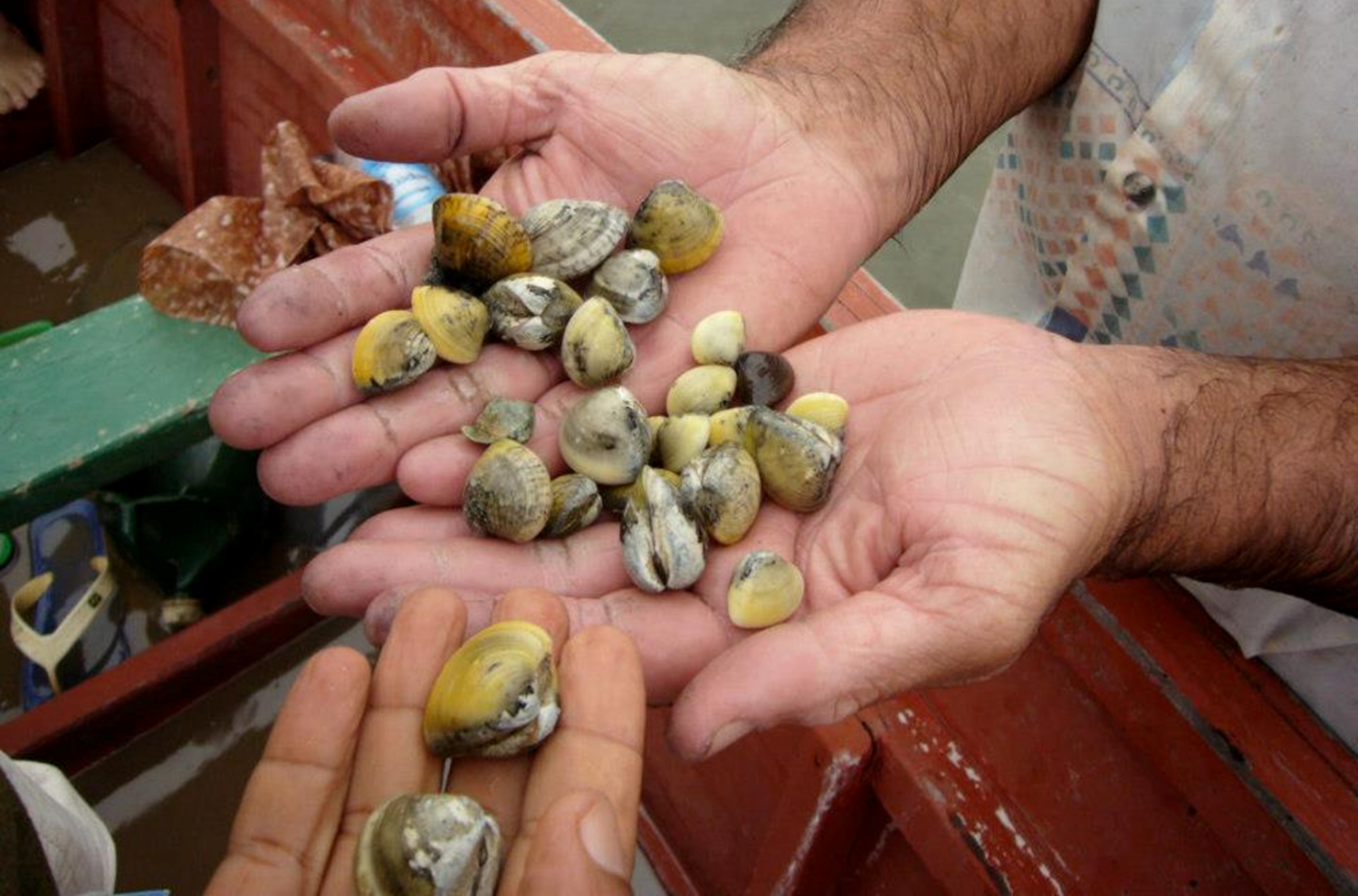
Shellfish

== Sources ==
- Felício-Fernandes, Gil; Roseli, Maria de Souza-Mosimann; Hermes, Moreira Filho (1994), "Diatomáceas no Rio Tavares, Manguezal do Rio Tavares, Florianópolis, Santa Catarina, Brasil. I. Ordem Centrales (excluídas as Rhizosoleniaceae e Chaetoceraceae).", INSULA Revista de Botânica (in Portuguese), 23
- Goncalves, Michael (26 February 2016), "Berbigão está cada vez mais raro na Reserva Extrativista Marinha do Pirajubaé", DC (in Portuguese)
- Projeto sobre a reserva extrativista do Pirajubaé incentiva o turismo ecológico (in Portuguese), IFSC, 27 November 2012
- Reserva Extrativista Marinha Pirajubaé (in Portuguese), MMA
- Reserva Extrativista Marinha Pirajubaé (in Portuguese), Via Rural, archived from the original on September 4, 2009
- Resex Pirajubaé (in Portuguese), Chico Mendes Institute for Biodiversity Conservation
- Unidade de Conservação: Reserva Extrativista Marinha Pirajubaé (in Portuguese), MMA: Ministério do Meio Ambiente
