= Association of Machadinho Rubber Tappers =

Fifteen extractive reserves in Brazil

- Associação dos Seringueiros de Machadinho
- IUCN category VI (protected area with sustainable use of natural resources)
- Machadinho Rubber Tappers reserves

- Location within Brazil
- Nearest city: Machadinho d'Oeste, Rondônia. Brazil
- Coordinates: 9.425363°S 61.997672°W
- Designation: Extractive reserve

The Association of Machadinho Rubber Tappers (Portuguese: Associação dos Seringueiros de Machadinho) operates fifteen small extractive reserves in the state of Rondônia, Brazil. They were formerly part of private rubber extraction concessions, and continue to be used by the descendants of the original rubber tappers to extract rubber and other forest products. Recently the reserves have been threatened by violence and illegal logging.

== General ==
The Association of Machadinho Rubber Tappers administers 15 small extractive reserves in the municipalities of Machadinho d'Oeste, Cujubim and Vale do Anari in the state of Rondônia. They are remnants of the former Seringal Santo Antônio, Seringal São Paulo and Seringal São Gonçalo rubber extraction concessions. The main resource extracted from the forest is rubber, as well as nuts and copaiba oil. The reserves are Angelim, Aquariquara, Castanheira, Freijó, Garrote, Ipê, Itaúba, Jatobá, Maracatiara, Massaranduba, Mogno, Piquiá, Roxinho, Seringueira and Sucupira.

Many of the residents were born in the region, descendants of the "rubber soldiers" who came to extract rubber for the foreign market in the 1940s. They have adapted their way of life to the environment. Only a few of the reserves have electricity. Latex extraction provides the main source of income. Other activities are growing cassava and making flour, production of bio-jewels, extraction and sale of copaiba and other oils. Some are trying to take advantage of license for sustainable timber harvesting. Production of eco-leather from plant fibre and oils is a promising source of income.

In April 2015 members of the association met with the Committee on Environment and Sustainable Development of the state legislature. The committee was told that the members lived in a climate of terrorism in Machadinho, and had been receiving death threats. 16 homicides had been recorded in the past ten years. The protected areas were being laid waste with no effort being made by the state government to protect them.

== Reserves ==
=== Angelim ===
Angelim Extractive Reserve has an area of 8,923 hectares (22,050 acres). It was created by decree 7.095 of 4 September 1995. It is divided between the municipalities of Cujubim (22.12%) and Machadinho d'Oeste (77.88%).

=== Aquariquara ===
Aquariquara Extractive Reserve has an area of 18,100 hectares (45,000 acres). It was created by decree 7.106 of 4 September 1995. It is in the municipality of Vale do Anari. In 1994, according to the ÍNDIA NGO, there were 181 residents. According to the 2000 survey by ASM / ASRMT there were 91 residents in 27 placements. There is considerable and diversified agricultural production, especially coffee, in Aquariquara. A project to manufacture and market babaçu (Attalea speciosa) flour was started in 1998, with considerable success. The output is sold to schools and stores in Machadinho.

=== Castanheira ===
Castanheira Extractive Reserve (Portuguese: Reserva Extrativista Castanheira) has an area of 10,200 hectares (25,000 acres). It was created by decree 7.105 of 4 September 1995. It is in the municipality of Machadinho d'Oeste. In 1994, according to the ÍNDIA NGO, there were 27 residents. According to the 2000 survey by ASM / ASRMT there were 25 residents in ten placements. One incident of logging was recorded in 2001–04, and there was irregular sale of placements and clearing above the established limits.

=== Freijó ===
Freijó Extractive Reserve (Portuguese: Reserva Extrativista Freijó) has an area of 600 hectares (1,500 acres) It was created by decree 7.097 of 4 September 1995. It is in the municipality of Machadinho d'Oeste. In 1994, according to the ÍNDIA NGO, there were four residents. According to the 2000 survey by ASM / ASRMT there were five two residents in one placement. According to the survey 99.48% of the original vegetation cover remains.

=== Garrote ===
Garrote Extractive Reserve (Portuguese: Reserva Extrativista Garrote) has an area of 803 hectares (1,980 acres) It was created by decree 7.109 of 4 September 1995. It is in the municipality of Machadinho d'Oeste. In 1994, according to the ÍNDIA NGO, there were nine residents. According to the 2000 survey by ASM / ASRMT there were eleven residents in two placements.

=== Ipê ===
Ipê Extractive Reserve (Portuguese: Reserva Extrativista Ipê) has an area of 815 hectares (2,010 acres). It was created by decree 7.101 of 4 September 1995. It is divided between the municipalities of Cujubim (21.07%) and Machadinho d'Oeste (78.93%). In 1994, according to the ÍNDIA NGO, there were 28 residents. According to the 2000 survey by ASM / ASRMT that number had dropped to two residents in two placements. According to the survey 99.48% of the original vegetation cover remains.

=== Itaúba ===
Itaúba Extractive Reserve (Portuguese: Reserva Extrativista Itaúba) has an area of 1,758 hectares (4,340 acres). It was created by decree 7.100 of 4 September 1995. It is in the municipality of Machadinho d'Oeste. In 1994, according to the ÍNDIA NGO, there were 3 residents. According to the 2000 survey by ASM / ASRMT that number had risen to 7 residents in three placements.

=== Jatobá ===
Jatobá Extractive Reserve (Portuguese: Reserva ExtrativistaJatobá) has an area of 1,135 hectares (2,800 acres) It was created by decree 7.102 of 4 September 1995. It is in the municipality of Machadinho d'Oeste. In 1994, according to the ÍNDIA NGO, there were 3 residents. According to the 2000 survey by ASM / ASRMT there were 7 residents in 3 placements. Original forest covers 89.5% of the reserve, and the remainder is used for agriculture.

=== Maracatiara ===
Maracatiara Extractive Reserve (Portuguese: Reserva Extrativista Maracatiara) has an area of 9,503 hectares (23,480 acres). It was created by decree 7.096 of 4 September 1995. It is in the municipality of Machadinho d'Oeste. In 1994, according to the ÍNDIA NGO, there were 66 residents. According to the 2000 survey by ASM / ASRMT there were 51 residents in 21 placements. A 2005 report noted irregular sale of placements and clearing above the allowed limits.

=== Massaranduba ===
Massaranduba Extractive Reserve is in the municipality of Machadinho d'Oeste, Rondônia. It has an area of 5,566 hectares (13,750 acres). According to an NGO in 1994 there were only five inhabitants and 99.48% of the original vegetation coverage remained. The main threat was illegal removal of timber.

=== Mogno ===
Mogno Extractive Reserve (Portuguese: Reserva Extrativista Mogno) has an area of 2,450 hectares (6,100 acres). It was created by decree 7.099 of 4 September 1995. It is in the municipality of Machadinho d'Oeste. In 1994, according to the ÍNDIA NGO, there were 13 residents. According to the 2000 survey by ASM / ASRMT there was only one resident.

=== Piquiá ===
Piquiá Extractive Reserve (Portuguese: Reserva Extrativista Piquiá) has an area of 1,449 hectares (3,580 acres). It was created by decree 7.098 of 4 September 1995. It is in the municipality of Machadinho d'Oeste. In 1994, according to the ÍNDIA NGO, there were 16 residents. According to the 2000 survey by ASM / ASRMT there were five residents in one placement.

=== Roxinho ===
Roxinho Extractive Reserve (Portuguese: Reserva Extrativista Roxinho) has an area of 882 hectares (2,180 acres) It was created by decree 7.107 of 4 September 1995. It is in the municipality of Machadinho d'Oeste. In 1994, according to the ÍNDIA NGO, there were 13 residents. According to the 2000 survey by ASM / ASRMT there were 5 residents in two placements. Factors that threaten the reserve are the removal of wood and hunting.

=== Seringueira ===
The Seringueira Extractive Reserve is in the municipality of Vale do Anari, Rondônia, to the south of Machadinho d'Oeste, surrounded by land that has been largely deforested. It has an area of 537 hectares (1,330 acres). The Machadinho River runs along the west of the reserve.

=== Sucupira ===
Sucupira Extractive Reserve (Portuguese: Reserva Extrativista Sucupira) has an area of 3.188 hectares (7.88 acres) (Decreto - It was created by decree 7.104 of 4 September 1995. It is in the municipality of Machadinho d'Oeste. According to the 2000 survey by ASM / ASRMT there were no residents.

== Sources ==
- Igor Cruz (2 April 2015), Associação denuncia devastação de reservas em Machadinho (in Portuguese), Rondônia Legislative Assembly
- Ozame, Thais Costa; Pereira, Amanda de Souza; Bonifácio, Diego Rodrigues; Tostes dos Santos, Ezequiel Junior; Alencar, Rubens Rodrigues de; Paula, Jania Maria de (July 2011), "Aspectos econômicos do modo de vida dos seringueiros de Machadinho d'Oeste - Rondônia", 63ª Reunião Anual da SBPC (in Portuguese), SBPC: Sociedade Brasileira para o Progresso da Ciência, ISSN 2176-1221
- RESEX Angelim (in Portuguese), ISA: Instituto Socioambiental
- RESEX Aquariquara (in Portuguese), ISA: Instituto Socioambiental
- RESEX Castanheira (in Portuguese), ISA: Instituto Socioambiental
- RESEX Freijó (in Portuguese), ISA: Instituto Socioambiental
- RESEX Garrote (in Portuguese), ISA: Instituto Socioambiental
- RESEX Ipê (in Portuguese), ISA: Instituto Socioambiental
- RESEX Itaúba (in Portuguese), ISA: Instituto Socioambiental
- RESEX Jatobá (in Portuguese), ISA: Instituto Socioambiental
- RESEX Maracatiara (in Portuguese), ISA: Instituto Socioambiental
- RESEX Massaranduba (in Portuguese), ISA: Instituto Socioambiental
- RESEX Mogno (in Portuguese), ISA: Instituto Socioambiental
- RESEX Piquiá (in Portuguese), ISA: Instituto Socioambiental
- RESEX Roxinho (in Portuguese), ISA: Instituto Socioambiental
- RESEX Seringueira (in Portuguese), ISA: Instituto Socioambiental
- RESEX Sucupira (in Portuguese), ISA: Instituto Socioambiental
