= Carrasco =

Carrasco may refer to:

== Places ==
=== Bolivia ===
- Carrasco Province, a province of Cochabamba Department
  - Carrasco National Park

=== Uruguay ===
- Carrasco, Montevideo, a seaside suburb of Montevideo
- Carrasco Creek, separating Canelones Department and Montevideo Department
- Carrasco International Airport, the largest airport in Uruguay

=== Elsewhere ===
- Carrasco Bonito, a Brazilian municipality in the state of Tocantins

== Other uses ==
- Carrasco (surname)
- 4171 Carrasco, a main-belt asteroid discovered in 1982
- Carrasco Polo Club, a Uruguayan multisport club best known for its rugby team
- Estadio Francisco Artés Carrasco, Carrasco stadium, a multi-use stadium in Lorca, Spain
- Hotel Carrasco, a seaside hotel in Montevideo, Uruguay
