= Extractive reserve =

Land category in Brazil, protected for sustainable use

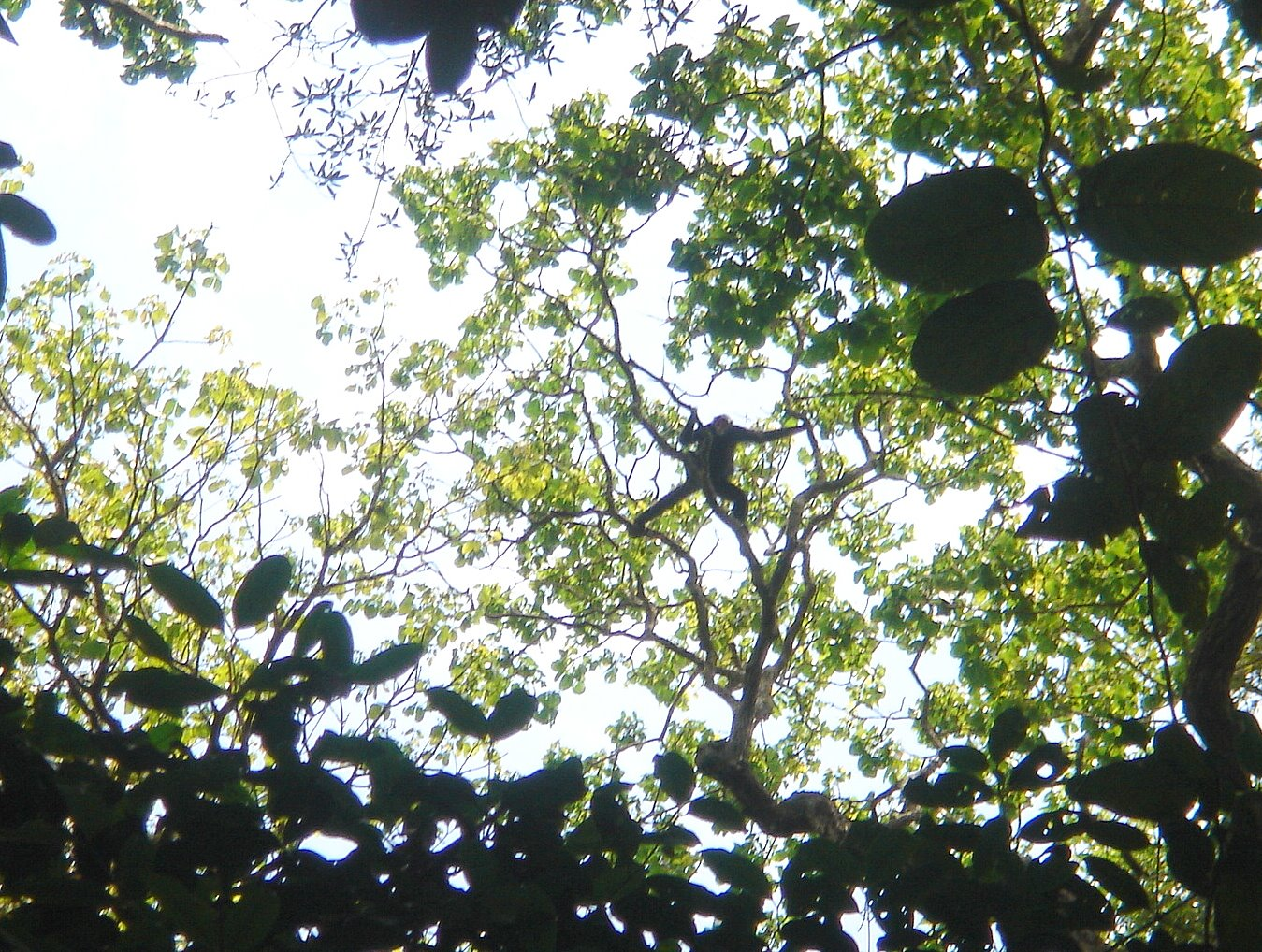
Spider monkey in the Lower Rio Branco-Jauaperi Extractive Reserve

An extractive reserve (Portuguese: Reserva Extrativista or RESEX) is a type of sustainable use protected area in Brazil. The land is publicly owned, but the people who live there have the right to traditional extractive practices, such as hunting, fishing and harvesting wild plants.

== Definition ==
In the broad sense, an extractive reserve is an area of land, generally state-owned where access and use rights, including natural resource extraction, are allocated to local groups or communities. Extractive reserves limit deforestation both by the local residents, preventing deforestation within their reserve, and by acting as a buffer zone to keep ranching and extractive industry out of the forests beyond.

"Extractive reserve" is among the types of sustainable-use, protected area defined by Law No. 9.985 of 18 July 2000. This established the National System of Conservation Units (SNUC). The extractive reserves are of public domain but the use of the land is allowed for traditional extractive populations, largely indigenous. They are areas used by traditional extractive populations whose livelihood is based on extraction, subsistence agriculture and small-scale livestock raising.

The reserves are created to protect the livelihoods and culture of these people, and also to ensure sustainable use of natural resources.

Public visits are allowed where compatible with local interests and the provisions of the management plan for the unit. Research is permitted and encouraged, subject to prior authorization with the responsible agency.

== On land ==
Extractive reserves in Brazil include:

Name	Level	State	Area (ha)	Created	Biome
Acaú-Goiana	Federal	Paraíba; Pernambuco	6,678	2007	Atlantic Forest
Alto Juruá	Federal	Acre	506,186	1990	Amazon
Alto Tarauacá	Federal	Acre	151,200	2000	Amazon
Angelim	State	Rondônia	8,923	1995	Amazon
Aquariqua	State	Rondônia	18,100	1995	Amazon
Arapixi	Federal	Amazonas	133,637	2006	Amazon
Arióca Pruanã	Federal	Pará	83,445	2005	Amazon
Auatí-Paraná	Federal	Amazonas	146,950	2001	Amazon
Baixo Juruá	Federal	Amazonas	187,982	2001	Amazon
Barreiro das Antas	Federal	Rondônia	107,234	2001	Amazon
Batoque	Federal	Ceará	602	2003	Coastal marine
Canutama	State	Amazonas	197,986	2009	Amazon
Cassurubá	Federal	Bahia	100,687	2009	Coastal marine
Castanheira	State	Rondônia	10,200	1995	Amazon
Catuá-Ipixuna	State	Amazonas	217,486	2003	Amazon
Cazumbá-Iracema	Federal	Acre	750,795	2002	Amazon
Chapada Limpa	Federal	Maranhão	11,971	2007	Amazon
Chico Mendes	Federal	Acre	970,570	1990	Amazon
Ciriaco	Federal	Maranhão	8,084	1992	Amazon
Curralinho	State	Rondônia	1,758	1995	Amazon
Cururupu	Federal	Maranhão	185,046	2004	Amazon
Extremo Norte do Tocantins	Federal	Tocantins	9,280	1992	Amazon
Freijó	State	Rondônia	600	1995	Amazon
Garrote	State	Rondônia	803	1995	Amazon
Guariba	State	Amazonas	150,465	2005	Amazon
Guariba-Roosevelt	State	Mato Grosso	164,224	1996	Amazon
Gurupá-Melgaço	Federal	Pará	145,298	2006	Amazon
Ipaú-Anilzinho	Federal	Pará	55,816	2005	Amazon
Ipê	State	Rondônia	815	1995	Amazon
Itaúba	State	Rondônia	1,758	1995	Amazon
Ituxi	Federal	Amazonas	776,940	2008	Amazon
Jaci Paraná	State	Rondônia	197,364	1996	Amazon
Jatobá	State	Rondônia	1,135	1995	Amazon
Juami-Japurá	Federal	Amazonas	745,830	2001	Amazon
Jutaí-Solimões	Federal	Amazonas	284,285	1983	Amazon
Lago do Capanã Grande	Federal	Amazonas	304,146	2004	Amazon
Lago do Cedro	Federal	Goiás	17,338	2006	
Lago do Cuniã	Federal	Rondônia	55,850	1999	Amazon
Mandira	Federal	São Paulo	1,176	2002	Atlantic Forest
Mapuá	Federal	Pará	94,464	2005	Amazon
Maracatiara	State	Rondônia	9,503	1995	Amazon
Massaranduba	State	Rondônia	5,566	1995	Amazon
Mata Grande	Federal	Maranhão	10,450	1992	Amazon
Médio Juruá	Federal	Amazonas	286,933	1997	Amazon
Médio Purus	Federal	Amazonas	604,209	2008	Amazon
Mogno	State	Rondônia	2,450	1995	Amazon
Pedras Negras	State	Rondônia	124,409	1995	Amazon
Piquiá	State	Rondônia	1,449	1995	Amazon
Quilombo Frechal	Federal	Maranhão	9,542	1992	Amazon
Recanto das Araras de Terra Ronca	Federal	Goiás	11,964	2006	
Renascer	Federal	Pará	211,741	2009	Amazon
Rio Branco-Jauaperi	Federal	Roraima	581,173	2018	Amazon
Rio Cajari	Federal	Amapá	501,771	1990	Amazon
Rio Cautário State	State	Rondônia	146,400	1995	Amazon
Rio Cautário Federal	Federal	Rondônia	73,818	2001	Amazon
Rio Gregório	State	Amazonas	427,004	2007	Amazon
Rio Iriri	Federal	Pará	398,938	2006	Amazon
Rio Jutaí	Federal	Amazonas	275,533	2002	Amazon
Rio Ouro Preto	Federal	Rondônia	204,583	1990	Amazon
Rio Pacaás Novos	State	Rondônia	342,904	1995	Amazon
Rio Preto-Jacundá	State	Rondônia	95,300	1996	Amazon
Rio Unini	Federal	Amazonas	833,352	2006	Amazon
Rio Xingu	Federal	Pará	303,841	2008	Amazon
Riozinho da Liberdade	Federal	Acre	325,603	2005	Amazon
Riozinho do Anfrísio	Federal	Pará	736,340	2004	Amazon
Roxinho	State	Rondônia	882	1995	Amazon
Seringueira	State	Rondônia	537	1995	Amazon
Sucupira	State	Rondônia	3,188	1995	Amazon
Tapajós-Arapiuns	Federal	Pará	647,611	1998	Amazon
Terra Grande-Pracuúba	Federal	Pará	194,695	2006	Amazon
Verde para Sempre	Federal	Pará	1,288,720	2004	Amazon

== At sea ==
Conservation units northeast of Belém

Marine extractive reserves in Brazil include:

Name	State	Admin	Area (ha)	Created
Araí-Peroba	Federal	Pará	62,035	2005
Arraial do Cabo	Federal	Rio de Janeiro	56,769	1997
Baía do Iguape	Federal	Bahia	10,074	2000
Caeté-Taperaçu	Federal	Pará	42,069	2005
Canavieiras	Federal	Bahia	100,646	2006
Chocoaré - Mato Grosso	Federal	Pará	2,786	2002
Corumbau	Federal	Bahia	89,500	2000
Cuinarana	Federal	Pará	11,037	2014
Delta do Parnaíba	Federal	Maranhão; Piauí	27,022	2000
Gurupi-Piriá	Federal	Pará	74,081	2005
Ilha do Tumba	State	São Paulo	1,128	2008
Lagoa do Jequiá	Federal	Alagoas	10,231	2001
Mãe Grande de Curuçá	Federal	Pará	37,062	2002
Maracanã	Federal	Pará	30,019	2002
Mestre Lucindo	Federal	Pará	26,465	2014
Mocapajuba	Federal	Pará	21,029	2014
Pirajubaé	Federal	Santa Catarina	1,444	1992
Prainha do Canto Verde	Federal	Ceará	29,794	2009
São João da Ponta	Federal	Pará	3,203	2002
Soure	Federal	Pará	27,464	2001
Taquari	State	São Paulo	1,662	2008
Tracuateua	Federal	Pará	27,154	2005

== Sources ==
- Áreas protegidas (in Portuguese), Apremavi - Associação de Preservação do Meio Ambiente e da Vida, archived from the original on 2016-05-02
- Brown, I. Foster (2001), "Extractive Preserves and Participatory Research as Factors in the Biogeochemistry of the Amazon Basin", in McClain, Michael E.; et al. (eds.), The biogeochemistry of the Amazon Basin, Oxford University Press, ISBN 978-0-19-511431-7
- Categorias (in Portuguese), ICMBio, archived from the original on 2016-07-13
- Extractive Reserve, ISA: Instituto Socioambiental
- Neumann, Roderick P.; Hirsch, Eric (2000), Commercialisation of non-timber forest products: review and analysis of research, CIFOR, pp. 18–19, ISBN 978-979-8764-51-6
- Oliveira Maciel, Marco Antonio de (18 July 2000), Lei No 9.985, de 18 de Julho de 2000 (in Portuguese) Regulates article 225 of the Federal Constitution and institutes the National System of Units of Conservation and other provisions.
