= Sampaio =

Municipality in Tocantins, Brazil

Coordinates: 5°20′52″S 47°52′22″W

- Municipality
- Flag
- Interactive map of Sampaio
- Country: Brazil
- Region: Northern
- State: Tocantins
- Mesoregion: Ocidental do Tocantins

Population (2020)
  - Total: 4,794
- Time zone: UTC−3 (BRT)

Sampaio is a municipality in the state of Tocantins in the Northern region of Brazil.

The municipality contains 6% of the 9,280-hectare (22,900-acre) Extremo Norte do Tocantins Extractive Reserve, created in 1992.

== See also ==
- List of municipalities in Tocantins
