= Extremo Norte do Tocantins Extractive Reserve =

Extractive reserve in Tocantins, Brazil

- Reserva Extrativista do Extremo Norte do Tocantins
- IUCN category VI (protected area with sustainable use of natural resources)
- Location within Brazil
- Nearest city: Carrasco Bonito
- Coordinates: 5.341093°S 48.003433°W
- Area: 9,280 hectares (22,900 acres)
- Designation: Extractive reserve
- Created: 20 May 1992
- Administrator: ICMBio

The Extremo Norte do Tocantins Extractive Reserve (Portuguese: Reserva Extrativista do Extremo Norte do Tocantins) is an extractive reserve in the state of Tocantins, Brazil.

== Location ==
The Extremo Norte do Tocantins Extractive Reserve is divided between the municipalities of Sampaio (6.12%) and Carrasco Bonito (93.88%) in the state of Tocantins. It has an area of 9,280 hectares (22,900 acres). The reserve lies to the north of the TO-201 highway, south of the Tocantins River.

== History ==
The Extremo Norte do Tocantins Extractive Reserve was created by federal decree 535 of 20 May 1992. On 9 December 2005 the Minister of the Environment appointed representatives of agencies and NGOs to elaborate the proposal for occupying the territory of the reserve. The deliberative council was created on 23 May 2011. The reserve is administered by the Chico Mendes Institute for Biodiversity Conservation (ICMBio). It is classed as IUCN protected area category VI (protected area with sustainable use of natural resources). Its purpose is to protect the livelihoods and culture of the traditional extractive population, and ensure the sustainable use of natural resources of the unit.

== Economy ==
As of 2009 the population of the reserve was fairly young. About 25% of the population is illiterate and 32% have no more than three years of education, mostly women. About 30% of girls do not attend school but help the family in production activities. The reserve is served by health centres in the Carrasco Bonito municipal seat. The main economic activity is the processing and marketing of babassu palm fruit, mainly by women. The men cultivate rice, beans, maize and cassava, mainly for their family consumption.

A 2015 study reported that after 22 years the families of the reserve still lived outside it in surrounding communities. The result had been constant competition for resources and disputes with farmers, and steady clearance of the babassu to expand pasturage for livestock.

== Sources ==
- Dayane Rouse Neves Sousa (2015), Transformações na vida das populações tradicionais a partir da criação da resex do Extremo Norte do Estado do Tocantins (PDF) (Thesis) (in Portuguese), Viçosa, Minas Gerais
- RESEX do Extremo Norte do Tocantins (in Portuguese), ISA: Instituto Socioambiental
- Resex Extremo Norte do Estado do Tocantins (in Portuguese), ICMBio: Chico Mendes Institute for Biodiversity Conservation
- Unidade de Conservação: Reserva Extrativista Extremo Norte do Tocantins (in Portuguese), MMA: Ministério do Meio Ambiente
