= Jequiá River (Alagoas) =

River in Alagoas, Brazil

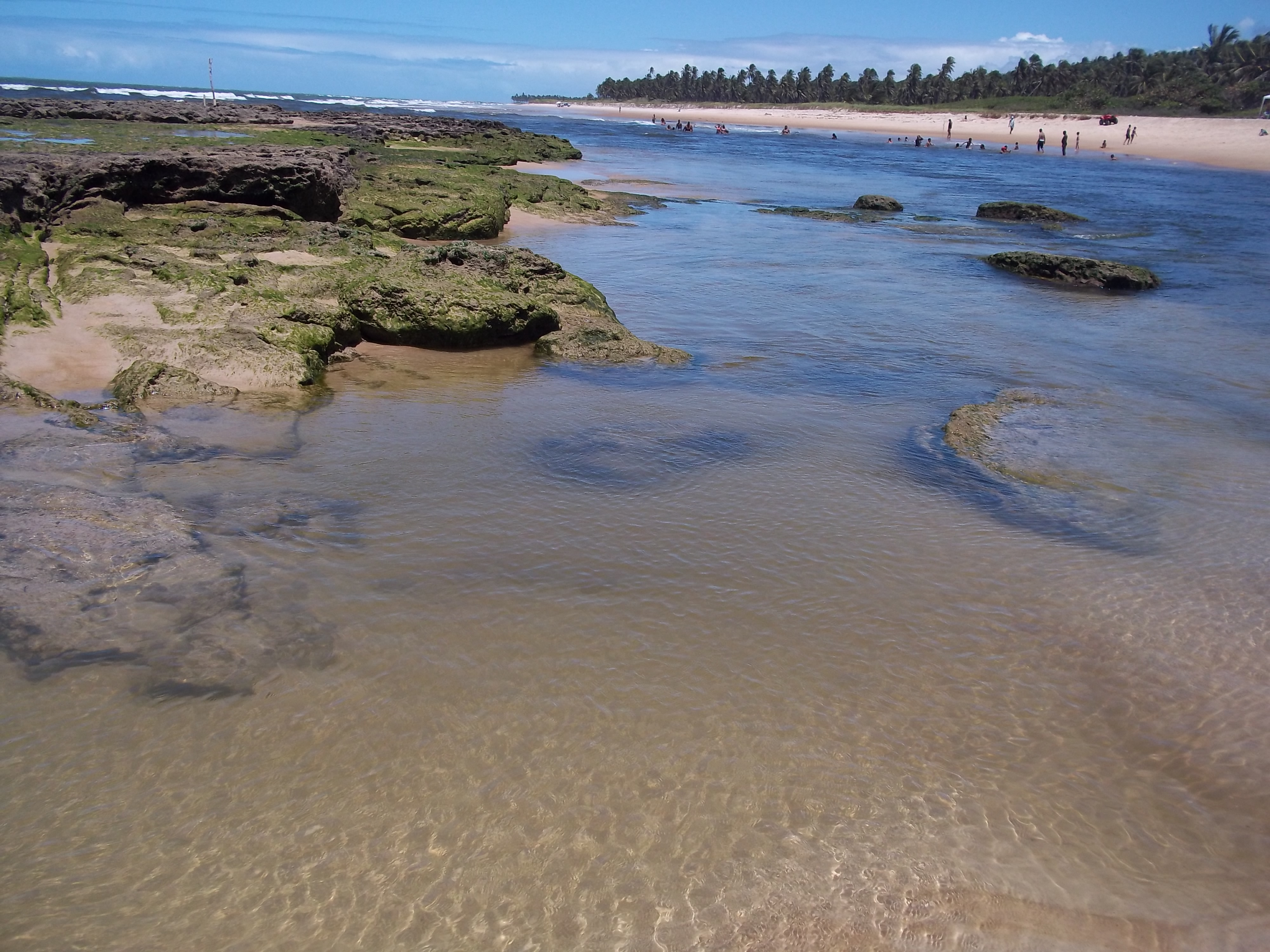

- Location within Brazil
- Native name: Rio Jequiá (Portuguese)

Location
- Country: Brazil

Physical characteristics
- Mouth
  - location: Atlantic Ocean
  - coordinates: 10.049147°S 36.030748°W

The Jequiá River (Portuguese: Rio Jequiá) is a river in the state of Alagoas, Brazil.

In its lower reaches the river broadens into the Lagoa Jequiá, which is protected by the 10,231 hectares (25,280 acres) Lagoa do Jequiá Marine Extractive Reserve, created in 2002. It then flows past the seat of the municipality of Jequiá da Praia before entering the Atlantic Ocean.

== See also ==
- List of rivers of Alagoas
