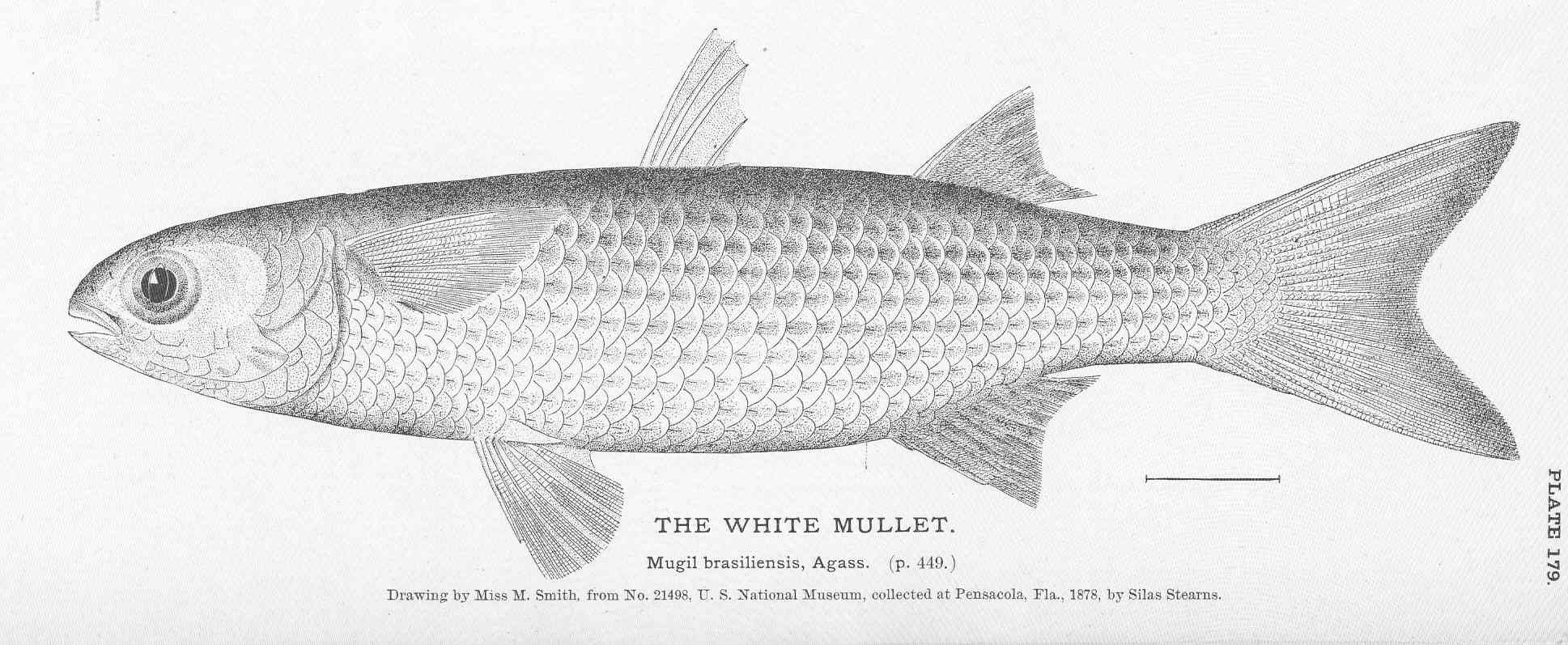

Conservation status
- Data Deficient (IUCN 3.1)

Scientific classification
- Kingdom: Animalia
- Phylum: Chordata
- Class: Actinopterygii
- Order: Mugiliformes
- Family: Mugilidae
- Genus: Mugil
- Species: M. liza

Binomial name
- Mugil liza Valenciennes, 1836

Synonyms
- M. platanus Günther, 1880; M. lebranchus Poey, 1860

= Lebranche mullet =

Species of fish

The Lebranche mullet or the liza (Mugil liza) is a species of saltwater fish in the family Mugilidae. It is found in the western Atlantic Ocean and Caribbean Sea and is fished commercially.

== Description ==
The size of a liza is commonly about 40 centimetres (16 in), a record size is 80 cm (31 in). There are 5 dorsal spines with 8 dorsal soft rays and 3 anal spines with 8 anal soft rays.

== Distribution ==
Mugil liza occurs in coastal waters in the Caribbean Sea and along the eastern seaboard of America from Florida south to Argentina. It is found in marine and brackish environments and even ventures into freshwater sometimes.

== Biology ==
Mugil liza is a detritivore and also feeds on filamentous algae. Spawning takes place offshore in the summer between May and August. The fecundity rate is high and several million eggs are produced. These are non-adhesive and are pelagic. The males mature at a younger age than the females and are less numerous.

== Human consumption ==
Mugil liza is collected from the shore using fishing nets. It is a highly commercial fish, fetching a high market price both fresh and salted.

The eggs are also commercialised. They are consumed dry or salted, and are considered a delicacy.

Because of the high value of this fish, it is frequently used in aquaculture.
