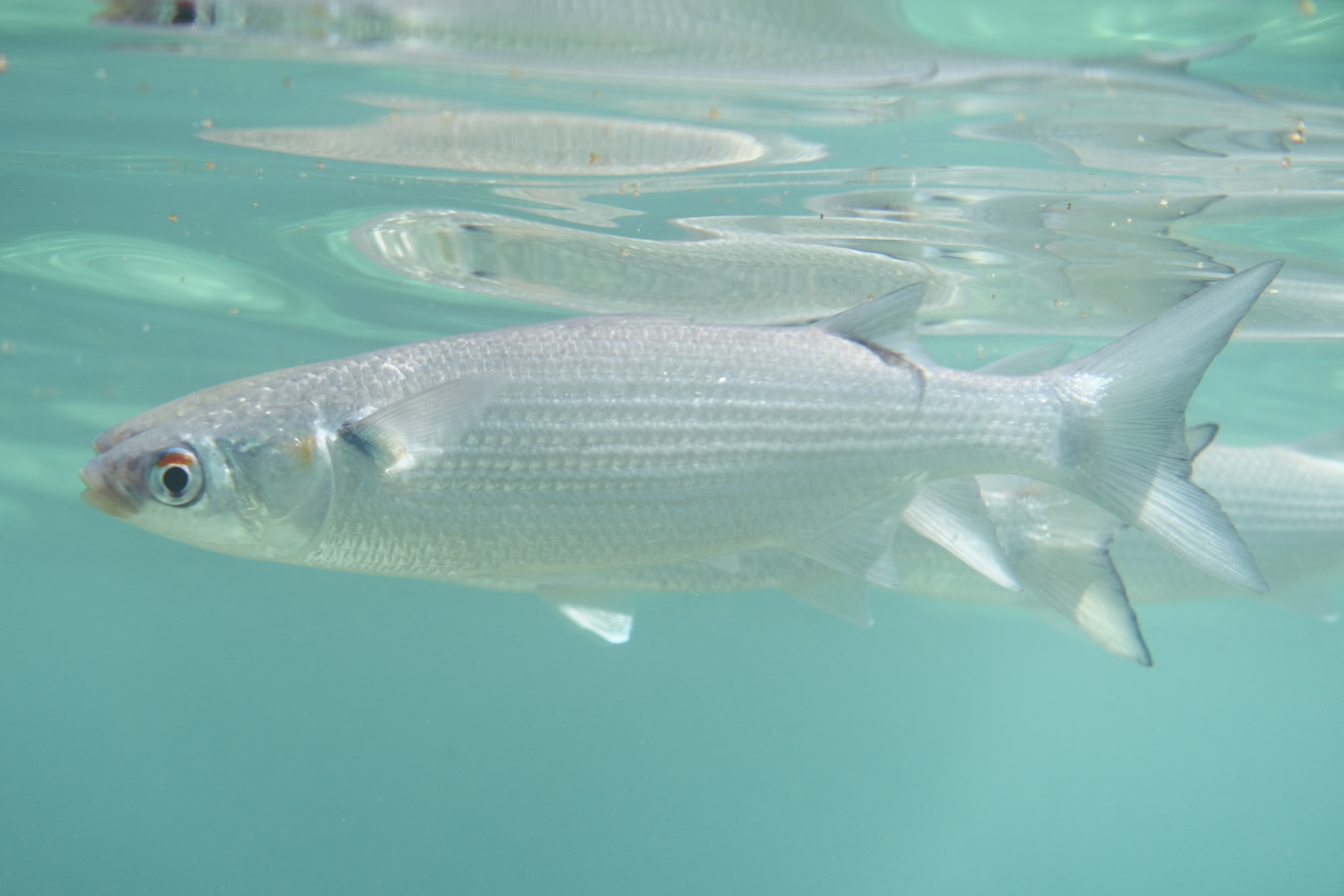

Conservation status
- Least Concern (IUCN 3.1)

Scientific classification
- Kingdom: Animalia
- Phylum: Chordata
- Class: Actinopterygii
- Order: Mugiliformes
- Family: Mugilidae
- Genus: Mugil
- Species: M. thoburni

Binomial name
- Mugil thoburni D. S. Jordan & Starks, 1896

Synonyms
- Xenomugil thoburni (Jordan & Starks, 1896)

= Mugil thoburni =

Species of ray-finned fish

Mugil thoburni, Thoburn's mullet, is a species of grey mullet, from the family Mugilidae, found in the eastern Pacific Ocean. It is most common around the Galapagos Islands but does occur on the coasts of Central America and South America as well. This species grows to a length of 29.5 centimetres (11.6 in) TL. It was formerly regarded as the only known member of the genus Xenomugil.

The specific name honours Wilbur Wilson Thoburn (1859-1899), lecturer in bionomics at Stanford University, where David Starr Jordan was president, in recognition of Thoburn's work on the sculpins.
