= Terra Grande-Pracuúba Extractive Reserve =

- Reserva Extrativista Terra Grande-Pracuúba
- IUCN category VI (protected area with sustainable use of natural resources)
- Location within Brazil
- Nearest city: Curralinho, Pará
- Coordinates: 1.390808°S 49.948999°W
- Area: 194,867.63 hectares (481,528.4 acres)
- Designation: Extractive reserve
- Created: 5 June 2006
- Administrator: Chico Mendes Institute for Biodiversity Conservation

The Terra Grande-Pracuúba Extractive Reserve (Portuguese: Reserva Extrativista Terra Grande-Pracuúba) is an extractive reserve in the state of Pará, Brazil.

== Location ==
The Terra Grande-Pracuúba Extractive Reserve is divided between the municipalities of São Sebastião da Boa Vista (35.42%) and Curralinho (64.58%), both in the state of Pará. It is on the island of Marajó to the northwest of Belém in the delta region where the Amazon and Tocantins rivers empty into the Atlantic Ocean. It is contained within the Marajó Archipelago Environmental Protection Area. It adjoins the Mapuá Extractive Reserve to the west. It has an area of 194,867.63 hectares (481,528.4 acres). The reserve is just over 95% covered by dense rainforest, 3% by savanna and 2% by pioneer formations. The main rivers are the Guajará, Piriá, Mucutá, Mutuacá, Canaticu and Pracuúba. Access to the Canaticu and Pracuúba is difficult during the summer dry season.

== History ==
The Terra Grande-Pracuúba Extractive Reserve was created by presidential decree on 5 June 2006. It is administered by the Chico Mendes Institute for Biodiversity Conservation (ICMBio). It has with the objective of protecting the livelihoods and culture of the people and ensure sustainable use of renewable natural resources traditionally used by the extractive population. The conservation unit is supported by the Amazon Region Protected Areas Program.

On 30 September 2008 the Instituto Nacional de Colonização e Reforma Agrária (National Institute for Colonization and Agrarian Reform) recognised the reserve as meeting the needs of 800 families of small farmers. The deliberative council was created on 20 April 2012. The management plan was approved on 28 February 2013. On 17 March 2016 regulations were published for fishing in the Canaticu and its tributaries, the Curralinho and Paráementa.

== Population and economy ==
The Terra Grande-Pracuúba Extractive Reserve is mostly inhabited by the traditional extractive population. There are 23 communities with about 800 families located on the rivers and lakes in the area. They exploit açaí palms, extract wood, fish, hunt and graze livestock. The communities on the Canaticu and Pracuúba rivers have an açaí crop that ripens in the winter, between seasons in other areas, which therefore commands a high price. Communities in the Guajará, Mutuacá, Mucutá and Piriá rivers and their tributaries do not usually have açaí and other forest products, but depend on timber as their main source of income. Many residents of these rivers are replanting açaí, which is scarce due to indiscriminate cutting for heart of palm. Environmental groups are trying to facilitate sustainable extraction of non-timber products. Before the council was formed there were conflicts between residents over use of the resources, which compromise the ecological integrity of the reserve.

== Sources ==
- Full list: PAs supported by ARPA, ARPA
- Resex Terra Grande Pracuúba (in Portuguese), Chico Mendes Institute for Biodiversity Conservation
- RESEX Terra Grande-Pracuúba (in Portuguese), ISA: Instituto Socioambiental
- Unidade de Conservação: Reserva Extrativista Terra Grande-Pracuúba (in Portuguese), MMA: Ministério do Meio Ambiente
