= Ji-Paraná Airport =

José Coleto Airport Aeroporto José Coleto
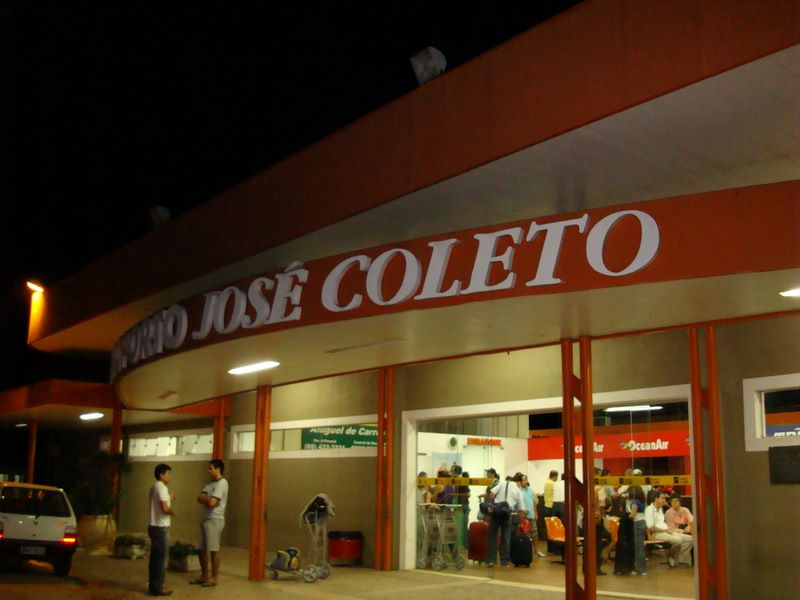
- IATA: JPR; ICAO: SBJI; LID: RO0005

Summary
- Airport type: Public
- Serves: Ji-Paraná
- Time zone: BRT−1 (UTC−04:00)
- Elevation AMSL: 182 m (597 ft)
- Coordinates: 10°52′14″S 061°50′48″W

Map
- Location in Brazil JPR (Brazil)

Runways
Direction	Length		Surface
Direction	m	ft	Surface
03/21	1,800	5,905	Asphalt
- Sources: ANAC, DECEA

José Coleto Airport (IATA: JPR, ICAO: SBJI) is the airport serving Ji-Paraná, Brazil.

== Airlines and destinations ==
Airlines	Destinations
Azul Brazilian Airlines	Campinas, Cuiabá
LATAM Brasil	São Paulo–Guarulhos (begins 3 December 2026)

== Access ==
The airport is located 10 km (6 mi) from downtown Ji-Paraná.

== See also ==
- List of airports in Brazil
