= Ji-Paraná =

Municipality in Rondônia, Brazil

- Municipality
- The Municipality of Ji-Paraná
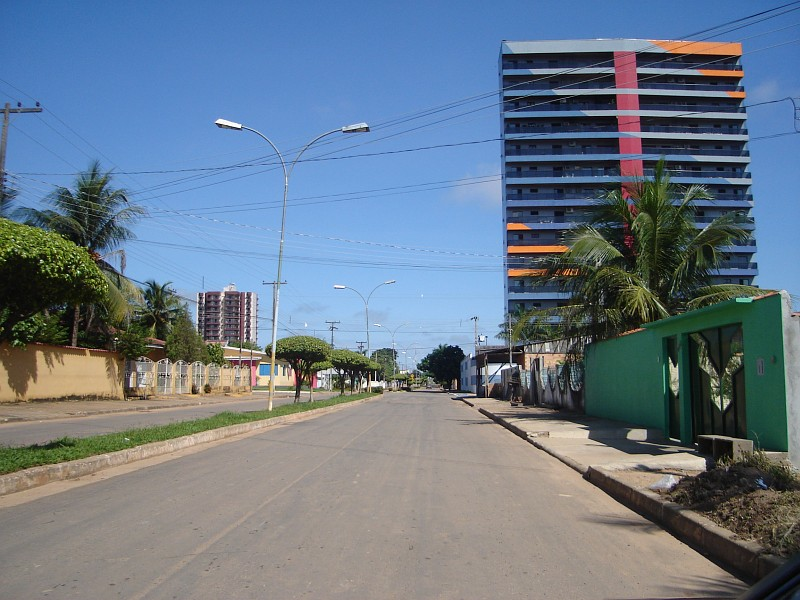
- Street view of Ji-Paraná

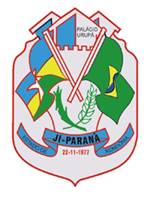
- Flag Coat of arms

- Location of Ji-Paraná municipality in the State of Rondônia

- Location in Brazil
- Coordinates: 10°53′07″S 61°57′06″W
- Country: Brazil
- Region: North
- State: Rondônia
- Founded: October 11, 1977

Government
  - Mayor: Isaú Raimundo da Fonseca União Brasil

Area
  - Total: 6,896.649 km^{2} (2,662.811 sq mi)
- Elevation: 170 m (560 ft)

Population (2022 Census)
  - Total: 124,333
  - Estimate (2025): 140,101
  - Density: 18.0280/km^{2} (46.6924/sq mi)
- Time zone: UTC−4 (AMT)
- HDI (2000): 0.753 – medium
- Website: www.ji-parana.ro.gov.br

Ji-Paraná is the second most populous municipality in the Brazilian state of Rondônia, with a population of 130,000 approximately. It is also the 16th most populous city of the Brazilian North Region, the 210th most populous city of Brazil, and the 113th of the Brazilian interior. It has an area of 6,897 km^{2}. The city is divided by the Ji-Paraná River.

The city economy is industry and dairy production. The city was also the first of Rondônia State to invest in high technology of data transmission, when it connected, through a wireless network, the City Hall.

The municipality name comes from Tupi, meaning "great river of axes", through the junction of yî (axe) e paranã (sea, great river). It is a reference to the great amount of rocks in the river looking like indigenous axes. The municipality is also known as the Heart of Rondônia, due to the central city location and the existence of a heart shaped island, located in the confluence of the Machado and Urupá River.

Located in central Rondônia, the city attracted many settlers from the 1970s onward. As a result of corruption, lawlessness and a general lack of regulation, Ji-Paraná has been at the centre of Rondônia's extreme deforestation, which today extends up to the border with Bolivia. The area between Ji-Paraná and Porto Velho, the regional capital 373 km away, is now largely deforested. The deforestation expands along smaller illegally built roads stemming from the BR-364 highway.

The city is served by José Coleto Airport.

The municipality contains part of the 346,861 hectares (857,110 acres) Jaru Biological Reserve, a fully protected conservation unit created in 1984.

== Climate ==
Ji-Paraná has tropical climate (Köppen climate classification Aw), on summer the temperature reaches to 34°C.
