= Jaru Biological Reserve =

Protected area in Brazil

- Reserva Biológica do Jaru
- IUCN category Ia (strict nature reserve)
- Location within Brazil
- Nearest city: Ji-Paraná, Rondônia
- Coordinates: 9.90°S 61.71°W
- Area: 346,861 hectares (857,110 acres)
- Designation: Biological reserve
- Created: 1961

Jaru Biological Reserve (Portuguese: Reserva Biológica do Jaru) is a biological reserve in the state of Rondônia, Brazil. It is part of the Southern Amazon Conservation Corridor.

== Location ==
The conservation unit was originally created in 1961 as the Jaru Forest Reserve, then replaced in 1984 by the Jaru Biological Reserve. The initial area of 268,150 hectares (662,600 acres) was increased by about 60,000 hectares (150,000 acres) on 2 May 2006. The reserve now covers 346,861 hectares (857,110 acres). It is administered by the Chico Mendes Institute for Biodiversity Conservation. It is located in the municipalities of Vale do Anari, Machadinho d'Oeste and Ji-Paraná in the state of Rondônia. The reserve would be in the proposed South Amazon Ecotones Ecological Corridor.

Altitudes range from 90 to 625 metres (295 to 2,051 ft). Average annual rainfall is 2,513 millimetres (98.9 in). Temperatures range from 14 to 40 °C (57 to 104 °F) with an average of 26 °C (79 °F). The reserve is in the middle Ji-Paraná River basin, in the sub-basin of the Tarumã stream. It lies between the Sierra do Moquém to the north and the Sierra da Providência to the south, south east and east. A survey recorded 168 species of fish, the probable presence of 189 species of amphibians and reptiles, 538 species of birds and over 73 species of mammals.

== Conservation ==
The Biological Reserve is a "strict nature reserve" under IUCN protected area category Ia. The purpose is to conserve biota and other natural attributes without human interference. It is located in the Madeira Tapajós interfluvial, one of the less well known regions of Brazil and one of great importance in conserving the Amazon biome. It is part of the Southern Amazon Conservation Corridor, which extends from the state of Tocantins to the state of Rondinia. These protected areas, as well as conserving biodiversity of the Amazon and the Cerrado contact areas, have proved the most effective as a barrier against deforestation. The conservation unit is supported by the Amazon Region Protected Areas Program.

Protected species are oncilla (Leopardus tigrinus), jaguar (Panthera onca) and giant otter (Pteronura brasiliensis).

== Sources ==
- Ayres, José Márcio; Da Fonseca, Gustavo A. B.; Rylands, Anthony B.; Queiroz, Helder L.; Pinto, Luiz Paulo; Masterson, Donald; Cavalcanti, Roberto B. (2005), Os Corredores Ecológicos das Florestas Tropicais do Brasil (PDF) (in Portuguese), Sociedade Civil Mamirauá, archived from the original (PDF) on 2016-07-31
- Full list: PAs supported by ARPA, ARPA
- Reserva Biológica do Jaru (in Portuguese), Chico Mendes Institute for Biodiversity Conservation, archived from the original on 2015-10-23
- Unidade de Conservação: Reserva Biológica do Jaru (in Portuguese), MMA: Ministério do Meio Ambiente
- Velasquez Fernandes, Carlos Henrique (2010), Plano de Manejo da Reserva Biológica do Jaru (PDF) (in Portuguese), Chico Mendes Institute for Biodiversity Conservation, archived from the original (PDF) on 2016-06-03
