= Lagoa do Jequiá Marine Extractive Reserve =

Extractive reserve in Alagoas, Brazil

- Reserva Extrativista Marinha da Lagoa do Jequiá
- IUCN category VI (protected area with sustainable use of natural resources)
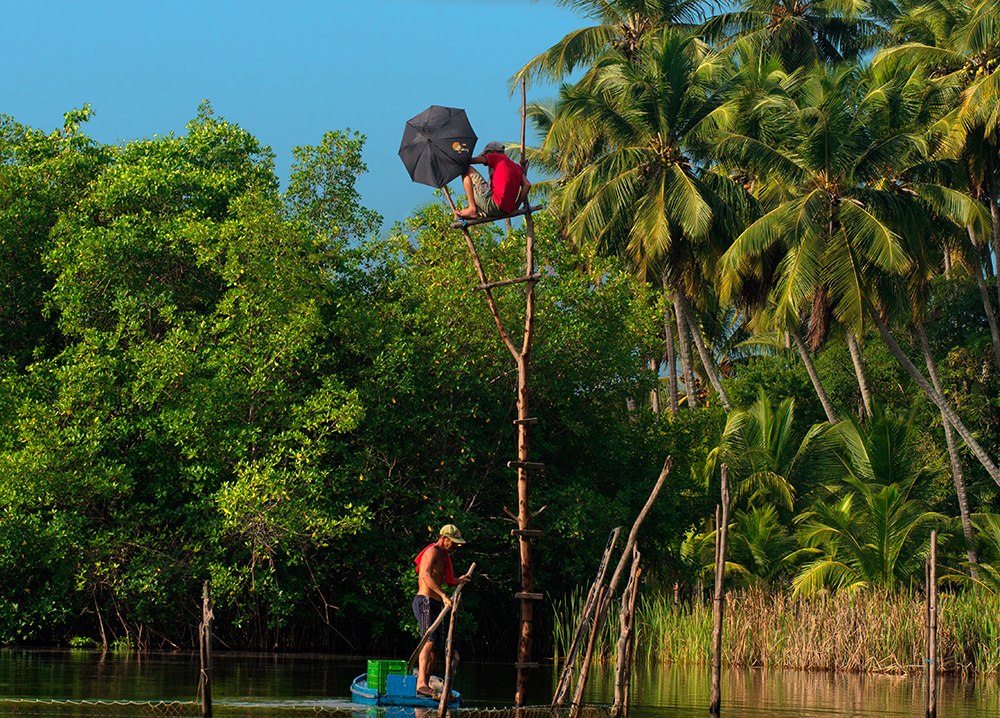
- Fishers in the reserve

- Location within Brazil
- Nearest city: Jequiá da Praia, Alagoas
- Coordinates: 9°57′45″S 36°01′45″W
- Designation: Extractive reserve
- Administrator: Chico Mendes Institute for Biodiversity Conservation

The Lagoa do Jequiá Marine Extractive Reserve (Portuguese: Reserva Extrativista Marinha da Lagoa do Jequiá) is a coastal marine extractive reserve in the state of Alagoas, Brazil. The reserve offers a scenic route for hikers and bikers, which makes it a popular destination. The reserve is famous for its waterfalls and colourful birds, such as flamingos.

== Location ==
The Lagoa do Jequiá Marine Extractive Reserve is in the municipality of Jequiá da Praia, and includes an area of sea offshore from this municipality and Coruripe and São Miguel dos Campos in Alagoas. It has an area of 10,231 hectares (25,280 acres). The reserve includes the Jequiá Lagoon, where the Jequiá River spreads out in the coastal plain just before it flows into the Atlantic Ocean. It protects the river down to its mouth, and then covers a rectangular area of the ocean that extends along the coast in the northeast direction.

The population in 2002 was about 2,000 people. They were mainly engaged in fishing and collecting crustaceans near the mangroves. Most of them have an incomplete primary education. The population generally has poor health due to deficient sanitation.

== History ==
The Lagoa do Jequiá Marine Extractive Reserve was created by federal decree on 27 September 2001. It is administered by the Chico Mendes Institute for Biodiversity Conservation (ICMBio). It is classed as IUCN protected area category VI (protected area with sustainable use of natural resources). An extractive reserve is an area used by traditional extractive populations whose livelihood is based on extraction, subsistence agriculture and small-scale animal raising. Its basic objectives are to protect the livelihoods and culture of these people and to ensure sustainable use of natural resources.

On 20 December 2007 the Instituto Nacional de Colonização e Reforma Agrária (INCRA: National Institute for Colonization and Agrarian Reform) recognised the reserve as meeting the needs of 3,000 families, who would qualify for PRONAF support. The deliberative council was created on 5 September 2011. On 18 July 2014 the profile of families benefiting from the reserve was approved.

== Sources ==
- Resex Lagoa do Jequiá (in Portuguese), Chico Mendes Institute for Biodiversity Conservation, archived from the original on Sep 28, 2016
- RESEX Marinha da Lagoa do Jequiá (in Portuguese), Instituto Socioambiental
- Unidade de Conservação: Reserva Extrativista Marinha da Lagoa do Jequiá, Ministério do Meio Ambiente
