= Jequiá da Praia =

Municipality in Alagoas, Brazil

- Municipality
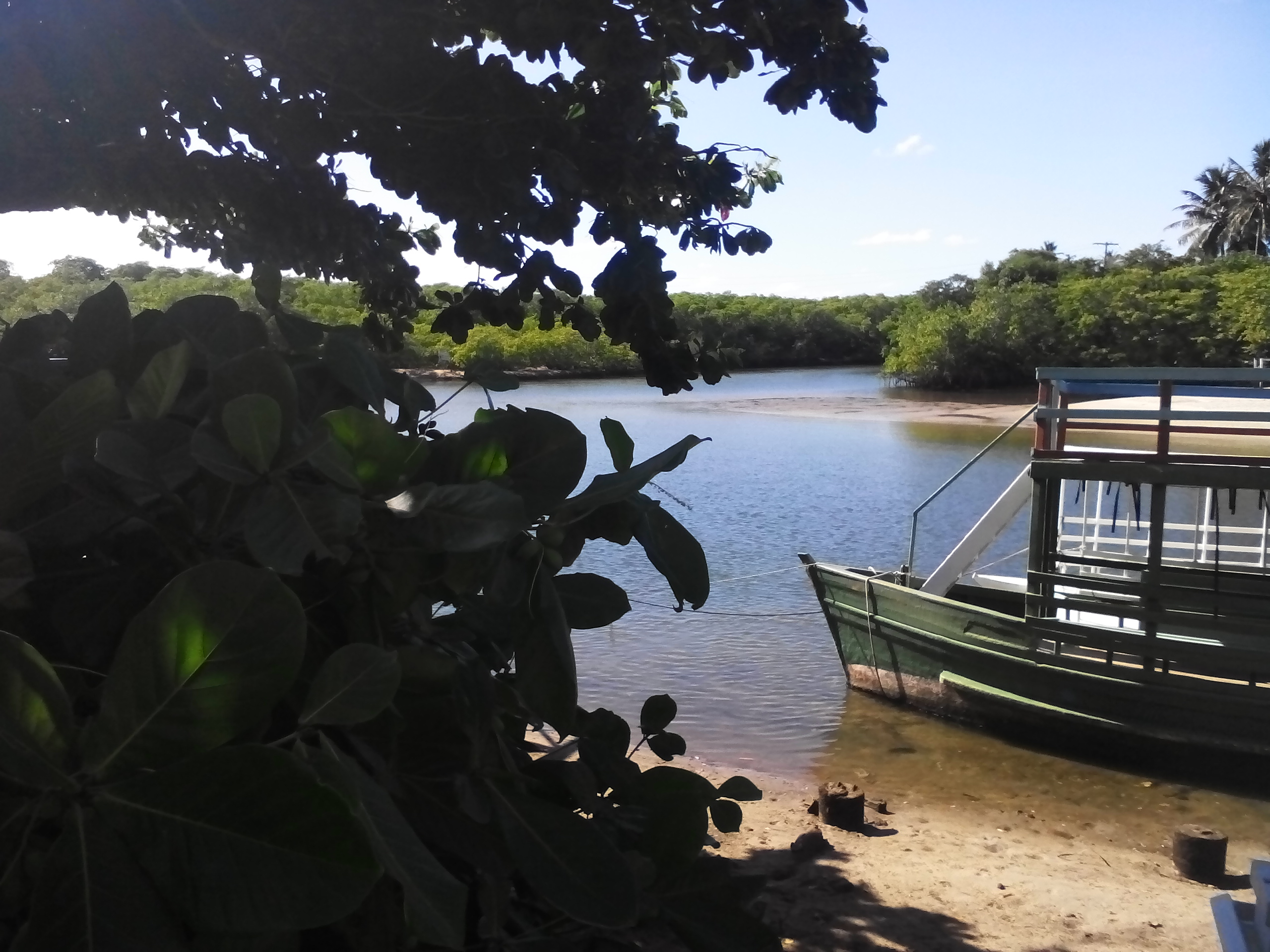
- Barra de Jequiá

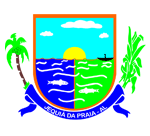
- Flag Coat of arms

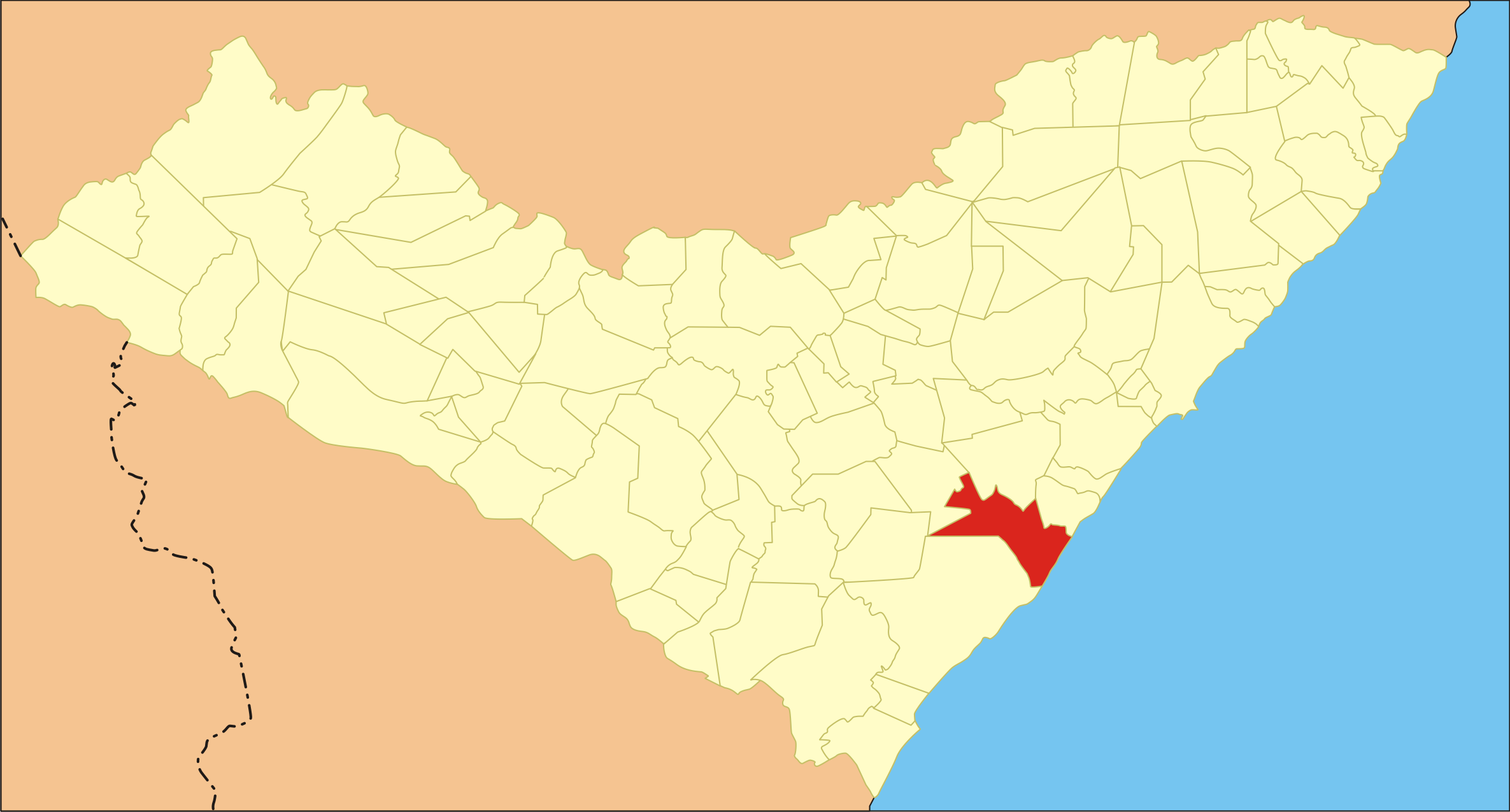
- Location in Alagoas
- Coordinates: 10.009690°S 36.025489°W
- Country: Brazil
- State: Alagoas

Area
  - Total: 338.600 km^{2} (130.734 sq mi)

Population (2020 est)
  - Total: 11,536
  - Density: 34.070/km^{2} (88.240/sq mi)
- Time zone: UTC−3 (BRT)

Jequiá da Praia (Central northeastern portuguese pronunciation: [ʒikiˈa ˈdɐ ˈpɾajɐ]) is a municipality located on the coast of the Brazilian state of Alagoas. Its area is 339 km^{2}, and in 2020 it had a population of 11,536.

The municipal seat lies on the Jequiá River. The municipality contains the 10,231 hectares (25,280 acres) Lagoa do Jequiá Marine Extractive Reserve, created in 2002.
