= Batoque Extractive Reserve =

Extractive reserve in Ceará, Brazil

- Reserva Extrativista do Batoque
- IUCN category VI (protected area with sustainable use of natural resources)
- Location within Brazil
- Nearest city: Aquiraz, Ceará
- Coordinates: 3.995551°S 38.240116°W
- Area: 602 hectares (1,490 acres)
- Designation: Extractive reserve
- Created: 5 June 2003
- Administrator: Chico Mendes Institute for Biodiversity Conservation

The Batoque Extractive Reserve (Portuguese: Reserva Extrativista do Batoque) is an extractive reserve in the state of Ceará, Brazil.

== Location ==
The Batoque Extractive Reserve is in the municipality of Aquiraz, Ceará. It has an area of 602 hectares (1,490 acres). The Batoque Lagoon covers about 55 hectares (140 acres) of the reserve. The environment around the lagoon is fragile, and is threatened by dense occupation of the surrounding land.

The village of Batoque is over 80 years old, founded by residents who fished and grew subsistence crops. The residents who engage in extractive activities are mainly involved in marine fishery using traditional boats and rafts. Some also engage in subsistence agriculture, growing crops such as potatoes and cassava. As of 2015 there were 262 families in the reserve. They are eligible for quarterly payments of R$300 in exchange for conserving the ecosystems.

== History ==
From the 1970s outsiders began to move into the region around the village. In 1989 the community founded an association to combat speculators, and in 1999 became engaged in a bitter struggle against a construction company that wanted to build a massive hotel project in the region. In 2000 the Federal Public Ministry (MPF) agreed to start the process for creating a reserve to protect the land. The Batoque Extractive Reserve was created by federal decree on 5 June 2003. It is administered by the Chico Mendes Institute for Biodiversity Conservation (ICMBio).

The reserve is classed as IUCN protected area category VI (protected area with sustainable use of natural resources). An extractive reserve is an area used by traditional extractive populations whose livelihood is based on extraction, subsistence agriculture and small-scale animal raising. Its basic objectives are to protect the livelihoods and culture of these people and to ensure sustainable use of natural resources.

On 24 August 2004 the Instituto Nacional de Colonização e Reforma Agrária (INCRA: National Institute for Colonization and Agrarian Reform) recognised the reserve as supporting 230 families of small rural producers, who would qualify for PRONAF support. The deliberative council was created on 24 May 2012. On 29 February 2016 a profile of the beneficiary families was published as a basis for discussion of scenarios.

== Sources ==
- Famílias da Reserva Extrativista do Batoque aderem ao Bolsa Verde (in Portuguese), ICMBio, 7 April 2015
- Resex Batoque (in Portuguese), ICMBio: Chico Mendes Institute for Biodiversity Conservation
- RESEX do Batoque (in Portuguese), ISA: Instituto Socioambiental
- Sousa Lopes, José Lidemberg de; Machado, Suellen Barbosa (10–16 August 2014), "A comunidade do Batoque: um estudo das unidades geoambientais e suas fragilidades", Anais do VII Congresso Brasileiro de Geografos (PDF) (in Portuguese), ISBN 978-85-98539-04-1
- Unidade de Conservação: Reserva Extrativista do Batoque (in Portuguese), MMA: Ministério do Meio Ambiente
