= Aquiraz =

Municipality in Ceará, Brazil

- Municipality
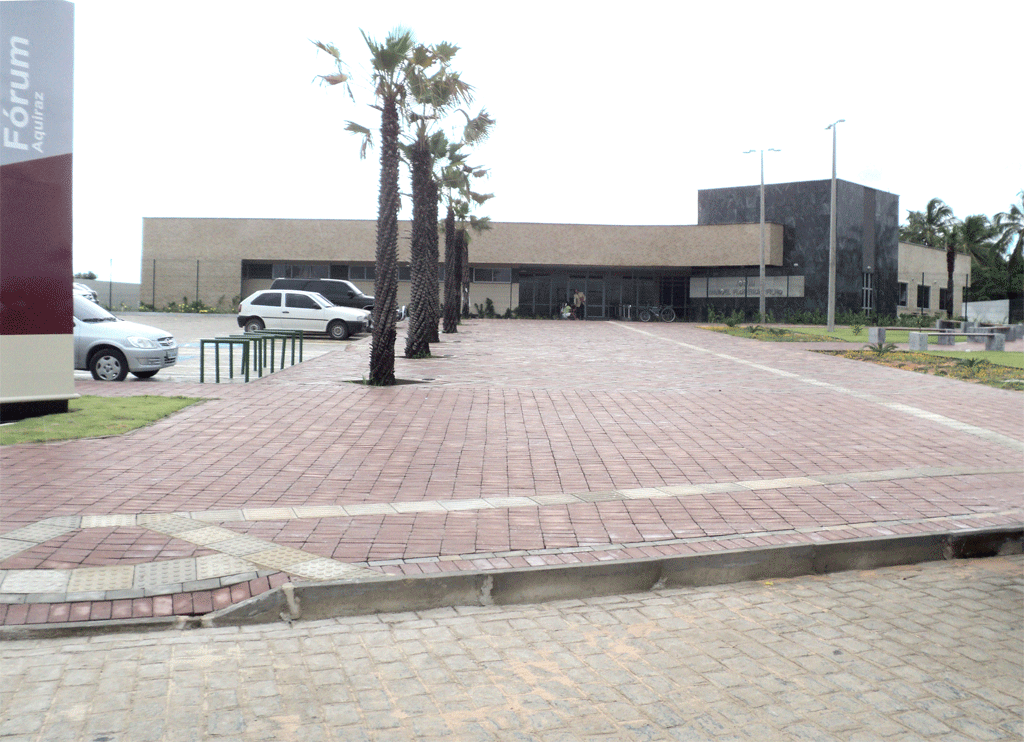
- Square in front of the Municipal Hall

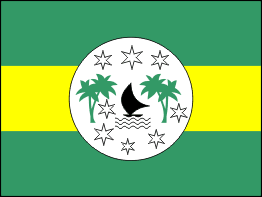
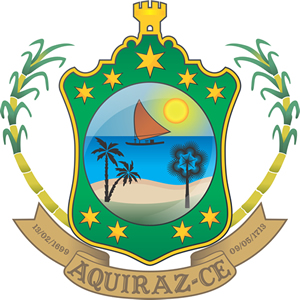
- Flag Coat of arms

- Location in Ceará state

- Location in Brazil
- Coordinates: 3°54′0″S 38°22′59″W
- Country: Brazil
- Region: Northeast
- State: Ceará

Area
  - Total: 482.38 km^{2} (186.25 sq mi)
- Elevation: 14 m (46 ft)

Population (2020)
  - Total: 80,935
  - Density: 167.78/km^{2} (434.56/sq mi)
- Time zone: UTC−3 (BRT)
- Website: www.aquiraz.ce.gov.br

Aquiraz is the thirteenth largest city in the state of Ceará and is located on the nation's northeast coast. The municipality has a population of 80,935 with a population density of 150 inhabitants per square kilometer. Aquiraz is located 32 km (20 mi) from the state capital of Ceará, Fortaleza. It borders the municipalities of Maranguape, Caucaia, Pacatuba, Guaiuba, and Maracanau; the Atlantic Ocean makes up its northeast border. The Pacoti and Catu rivers cross Aquiraz and empty into the ocean.

Tourism is the main economic base of Aquiraz. Ceramic material are also produced in the town.

== History ==
Aquiraz was the first village of the Captaincy, and originally simply named the Vila da Capitania do Ceará (Town of the Captaincy of Ceará). It was elevated to village level on 30 February 1699, and to city status on 27 December 1938. In the eighteenth century the Society of Jesus did notable work in the area. Aquiraz also served as the seat-city of Ceará before Fortaleza.

== Batoque Extractive Reserve ==
The municipality contains the 602 hectares (1,490 acres) Batoque Extractive Reserve, created in 2003.

== Protected sites ==
=== Meat Market of Aquiraz ===
The Meat Market of Aquiraz dates to the 19th century and is built from local materials. The historian Clóvis Ramiro Jucá Neto called the market "one of the most important works of traditional architecture in Brazil." The market has a simple rectangular floor plan. The woodwork is of carnaúba palm (Copernicia prunifera). A single story roof is supported by a central brick column. The market became a protected structure by IPHAN in 1981.

=== Casa de Câmara e Cadeia de Aquiraz ===
The former Casa de Câmara e Cadeia de Aquiraz (Town Hall and Jail of Aquiraz) was built in two distinct stages: the first floor was built in the 18th century, and the second in 1877. The building was adapted into a sacred art museum in 1967 called the São José de Ribamar Museum of Sacred Art (Museu Sacro São José de Ribamar). It was closed for renovation in 1978 but reopened in 1980. The museum collection consists of approximately 640 pieces of sacred art. They include carved wooden images and silver objects dating to the 18th century.

=== Parish Church of Saint Joseph of Ribamar ===
The Parish Church of Saint Joseph of Ribamar (Igreja Matriz de São José do Ribamar) is located on Praça da Matriz and dates to the 18th century. The parish church is in a simple style with little adornment. The side of the church, unusually, faces the square, not the church façade. The ceiling of the chancel features scenes of the life of Saint Joseph. The structure has a large churchyard and with a low wall and cross.

== Notable people ==
- Ana Miranda – Poet who currently resides in Aquiraz.
- Valentina Sampaio – Model and actress who was born in Aquiraz.

== Twin towns – sister cities ==
Aquiraz is twinned with:

- Frederick, Maryland, United States
- São Vicente, Barlavento Islands, Cape Verde
