= Carrasco Bonito =

Municipality in Tocantins, Brazil

- Municipality
- Location in Tocantins state

- Location in Brazil
- Coordinates: 5°19′19″S 48°2′6″W
- Country: Brazil
- Region: North
- State: Tocantins

Area
  - Total: 193 km^{2} (75 sq mi)

Population (2020)
  - Total: 4,130
  - Density: 21.4/km^{2} (55.4/sq mi)
- Time zone: UTC−3 (BRT)

Carrasco Bonito is a municipality in the Brazilian state of Tocantins. Carrasco Bonito's population was at 4,130 in 2020 and it has an area of 193 km^{2}.

The municipality contains 94% of the 9,280-hectare (22,900-acre) Extremo Norte do Tocantins Extractive Reserve, created in 1992.

== See also ==
- List of municipalities in Tocantins
