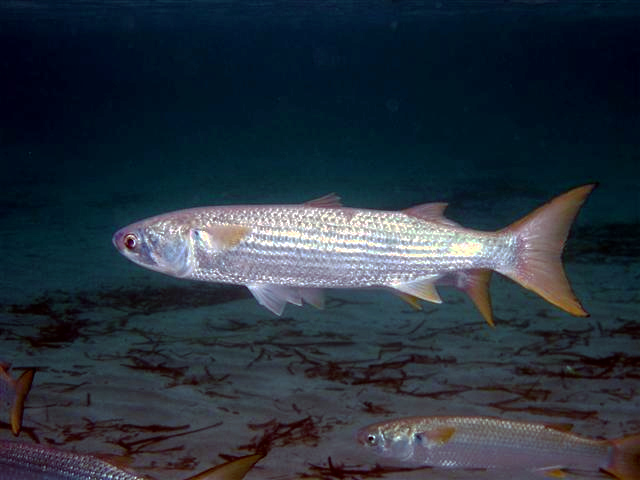
- Mugil cephalus

Scientific classification
- Kingdom: Animalia
- Phylum: Chordata
- Class: Actinopterygii
- Division: Teleostei
- Order: Mugiliformes
- Family: Mugilidae
- Genus: Mugil; Linnaeus, 1758

Type species
- Mugil cephalus Linnaeus, 1758

Synonyms
- Arnion Gistel, 1848; Ello Gistel, 1848; Querimana D.S. Jordan & Gilbert, 1883; Xenomugil Schultz, 1946

= Mugil =

Mugil Temporal range: Late Oligocene to present

Genus of ray-finned fishes

Mugil is a genus of mullets in the family Mugilidae. Members of Mugil are found worldwide in tropical, subtropical, and temperate coastal marine waters, but they may also enter estuaries and rivers.

== Species ==
Currently, 16 species in this genus are recognized:

- Mugil bananensis Pellegrin, 1927 (banana mullet)
- Mugil brevirostris A. Miranda-Ribeiro, 1915
- Mugil broussonnetii Valenciennes, 1836 (Broussonnet's mullet)
- Mugil capurrii Perugia, 1892 (leaping African mullet)
- Mugil cephalus Linnaeus, 1758 (flathead grey mullet)
- Mugil curema Valenciennes, 1836 (white mullet)
- Mugil curvidens Valenciennes, 1836 (dwarf mullet)
- Mugil gaimardianus Desmarest, 1831 (redeye mullet)
- Mugil galapagensis Ebeling, 1961 (Galapagos mullet)
- Mugil hospes D. S. Jordan & Culver, 1895 (Hospe mullet)
- Mugil incilis Hancock, 1830 (Parassi mullet)
- Mugil liza Valenciennes, 1836 (Lebranche mullet)
- Mugil longicauda Guitart & Alvarez-Lojonchere, 1976
- Mugil margaritae Menezes, Nirchio, C. de Oliveira & Siccha-Ramirez, 2015
- Mugil rubrioculus I. J. Harrison, Nirchio, C. de Oliveira, Ron, & Gaviria, 2007
- Mugil setosus C. H. Gilbert, 1892 (Liseta mullet)
- Mugil thoburni D.S. Jordan & Starks, 1896 (Thoburn's mullet)
- Mugil trichodon Poey, 1875 (fantail mullet)

The oldest known member of the family is †Mugil princeps Agassiz, 1843 from the latest Oligocene-aged Aix-en-Provence Formation of France. When calibrated with this fossil species, molecular phylogenies suggest that the modern evolutionary radiation of Mugil arose about 30 million years ago.
