= Vale do Anari =

Municipality in Rondônia, Brazil

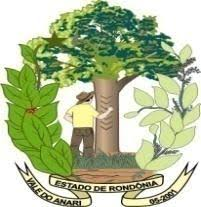
- Flag Coat of arms

- within Rondonia State
- Coordinates: 9°51′27″S 62°10′29″W
- Established: 22/06/1994

Area
  - Land: 3,135.141 km^{2} (1,210.485 sq mi)
- Elevation: 140 m (460 ft)

Population (2020)
  - Total: 11,377
  - Density: 3.6289/km^{2} (9.3987/sq mi)
- Demonym: anariense
- Time zone: UTC−4 (AMT)

Vale do Anari is a municipality located in the Brazilian state of Rondônia. Its population was 11,377 (2020) and its area is 3,135 km^{2}.

== History ==
The municipality was instated by law n°572 (22 June 1994), signed by governor Oswaldo Piana Filho, with its area taken from Machadinho d'Oeste municipality.

The municipality contains part of the 346,861 hectares (857,110 acres) Jaru Biological Reserve, a fully protected conservation unit created in 1984. It contains the 537 hectares (1,330 acres) Seringueira Extractive Reserve, one of a number of small sustainable use units in the region whose primary product is rubber. The municipality also contains the Aquariquara Extractive Reserve, also created in 1995.
