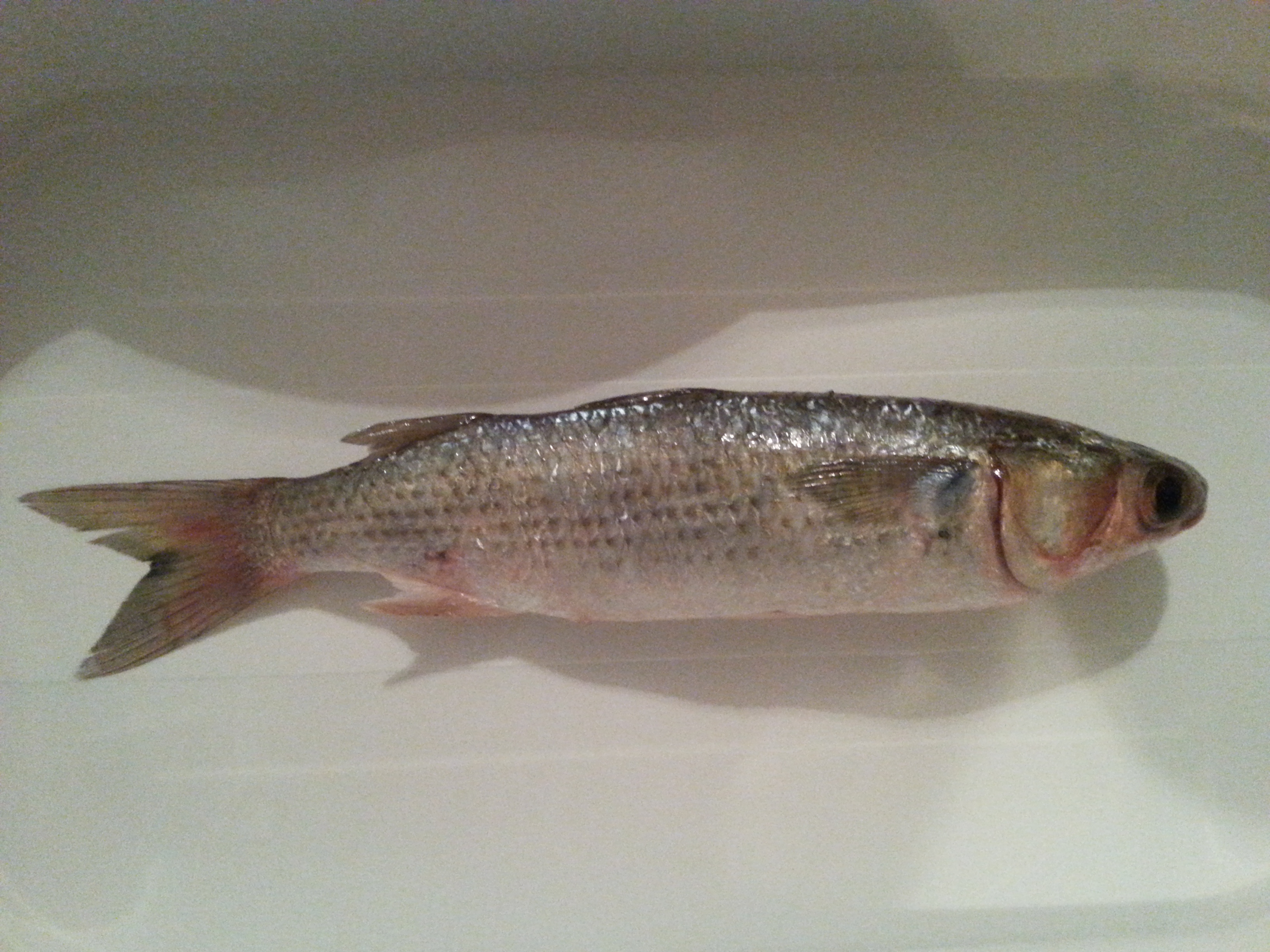

Conservation status
- Least Concern (IUCN 3.1)

Scientific classification
- Kingdom: Animalia
- Phylum: Chordata
- Class: Actinopterygii
- Order: Mugiliformes
- Family: Mugilidae
- Genus: Mugil
- Species: M. curema

Binomial name
- Mugil curema Valenciennes, 1836

= White mullet =

Species of fish

The white mullet or silver mullet (Mugil curema) is a tropical and subtropical marine fish of the family Mugilidae. It is commonly about 30 cm (12 in) long.

Note that silver mullet is also a common name used for fantail mullet (Mugil trichodon).

== Distribution and habitat ==
The white mullet is an Atlantic and Pacific fish mainly found on American coasts. In the Western Atlantic it ranges from Argentina to Cape Cod and, rarely, even up to Nova Scotia. In the Eastern Atlantic it occurs from Namibia to Senegal, and in the Eastern Pacific from Chile to the Gulf of California.

The white mullet is found along sandy coasts and in littoral pools, but also occurs in brackish lagoons and estuaries on muddy substrates and sometimes even in rivers. Juveniles in particular invade estuaries and coastal lagoons. Adults occur in schools.

== Atlantic USA ==
In the US, owing to their small size (less than 12 in (300 mm)), white mullets are primarily used for bait. In some parts of Florida and southern Alabama, they are occasionally eaten in the place of the much larger striped mullet (or flathead mullet) (Mugil cephalus). Adult white and striped mullet consume the mud found on the bottom of estuarine waters, digesting the algae, plankton, and plant and animal detritus therein. These mullets are unique in having a muscular gizzard. They are an important part of the ecologies of estuarine and coastal waters of the Gulf and Atlantic coasts of America.
