= Valdir Raupp =

Brazilian politician

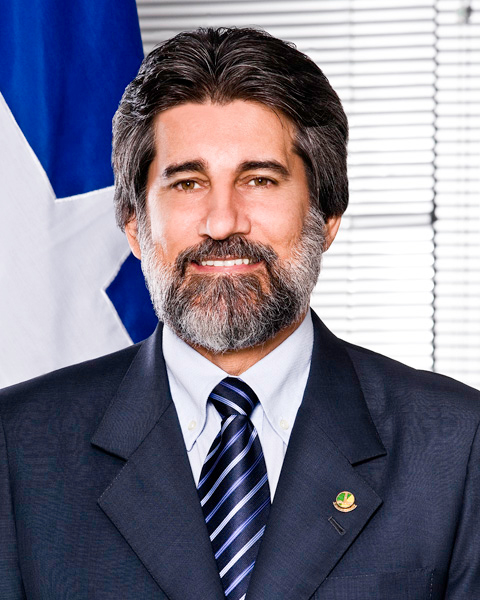

Senator from Rondônia
- In office February 1, 2003 – February 1, 2019

Governor of Rondônia
- In office January 1, 1995 – January 1, 1999

Personal details
- Born: August 24, 1955 (age 70) São João do Sul, Santa Catarina
- Party: Brazilian Democratic Movement Party

Valdir Raupp (born August 24, 1955) is a Brazilian politician. He has represented Rondônia in the Federal Senate since 2003. Previously, he was Governor of Rondônia from 1995 to 1999. He is a member of the Brazilian Democratic Movement Party.
