= São Sebastião da Boa Vista =

- Municipality
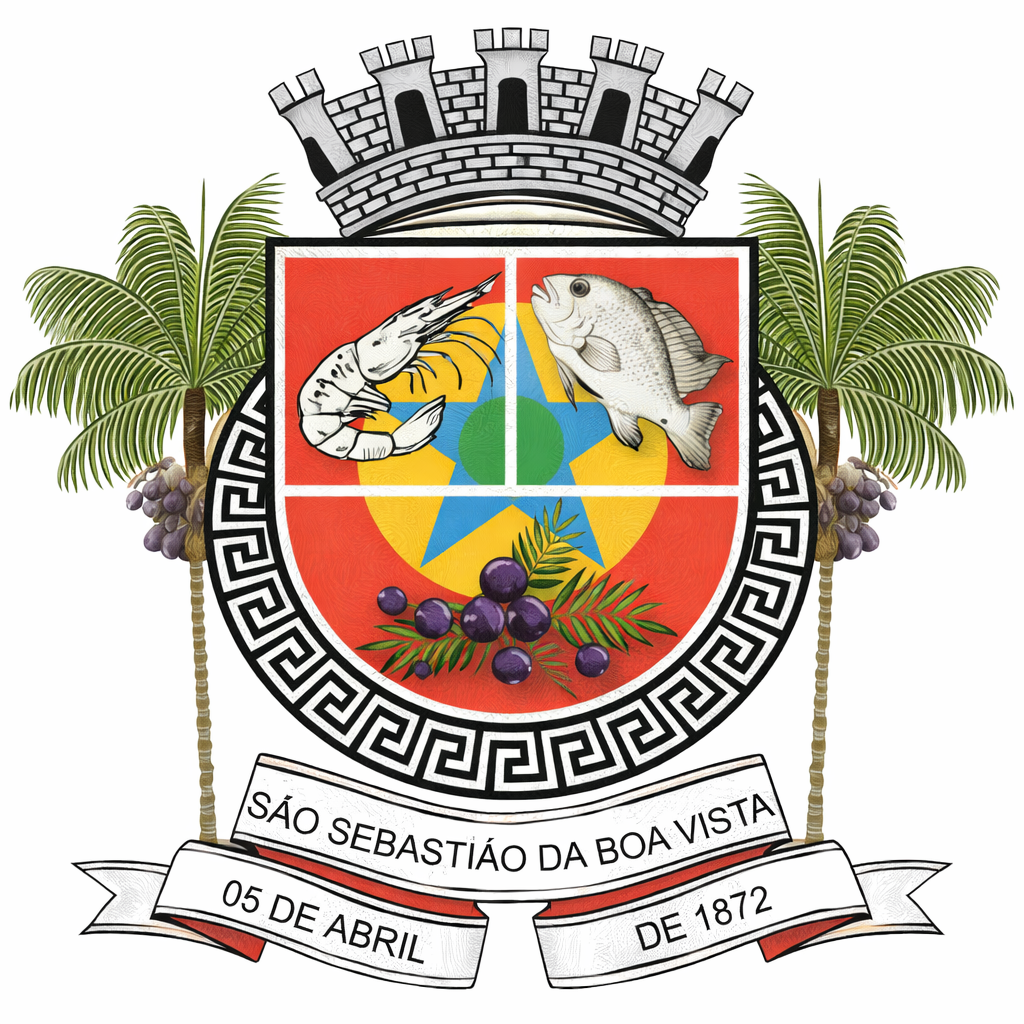
- Flag Coat of arms

- Location in the State of Pará
- Coordinates: 01°43′04″S 49°32′27″W
- Country: Brazil
- Region: North
- State: Pará

Area
  - Total: 1,632.218 km^{2} (630.203 sq mi)
- Elevation: 2 m (6.6 ft)

Population (2020)
  - Total: 26,974
  - Density: 12.1/km^{2} (31/sq mi)
- Time zone: UTC−3 (BRT)
- Postal Code: 68820-000

São Sebastião da Boa Vista is a Brazilian municipality located in the state of Pará. Its population as of 2020 is estimated to be 26,974 people. The area of the municipality is 1.632,218 km^{2}. The city belongs to the mesoregion Marajó and to the microregion of Furos de Breves.

== Geography ==
The municipality is on the island of Marajó to the northwest of Belém in the delta region where the Amazon and Tocantins rivers empty into the Atlantic Ocean. It contains part of the 194,868 hectares (481,530 acres) Terra Grande-Pracuúba Extractive Reserve, a sustainable use conservation unit created in 2006. It is contained within the 59,985-square-kilometre (23,160 sq mi) Marajó Archipelago Environmental Protection Area, a sustainable use conservation unit established in 1989 to protect the environment of the delta region.

== See also ==
- List of municipalities in Pará
