= Machadinho d'Oeste =

Municipality in Rondônia, Brazil

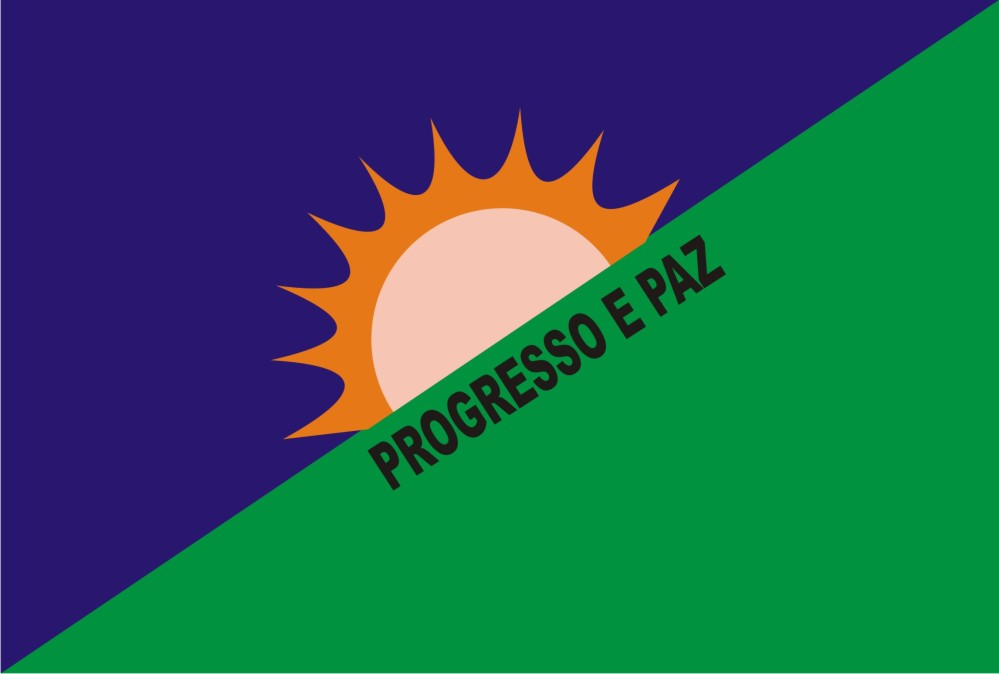
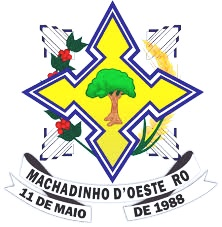
- Flag Coat of arms
- Motto: Machadinho d'Oeste a cidade que cresce!
- within Rondonia State
- Coordinates: 9°25′31″S 61°59′51″W
- Country: Brazil
- State: Rondonia
- Municipality: Machadinho d'Oeste
- Established: 11/05/1988

Government
  - Prefect: Mario Alves (PV)

Area
  - Total: 8,509.274 km^{2} (3,285.449 sq mi)

Population (2020)
  - Total: 40,867
  - Density: 4.8026/km^{2} (12.439/sq mi)
- Demonym: machadinhense-d'oeste
- Time zone: UTC−4 (AMT)

Machadinho d'Oeste is a municipality located in the Brazilian state of Rondônia. Its population was 40,867 (2020) and its area is 8,509 km^{2}.

The municipality contains part of the 346,861-hectare (857,110-acre) Jaru Biological Reserve, a fully protected conservation unit created in 1984. It also contains 13% of the Campos Amazônicos National Park, a 961,318 hectares (2,375,470 acres) protected area created in 2006 that protects an unusual enclave of cerrado vegetation in the Amazon rainforest.

The municipality contains 78% of the Angelim Extractive Reserve and 79% of the Ipê Extractive Reserve. It also contains the Castanheira, Freijó, Garrote, Itaúba, Jatobá, Maracatiara, Massaranduba, Mogno, Piquiá, Roxinho and Sucupira extractive reserves.

== See also ==
- List of municipalities in Rondônia
