= Cujubim =

Municipality in Rondônia, Brazil

- Municipality
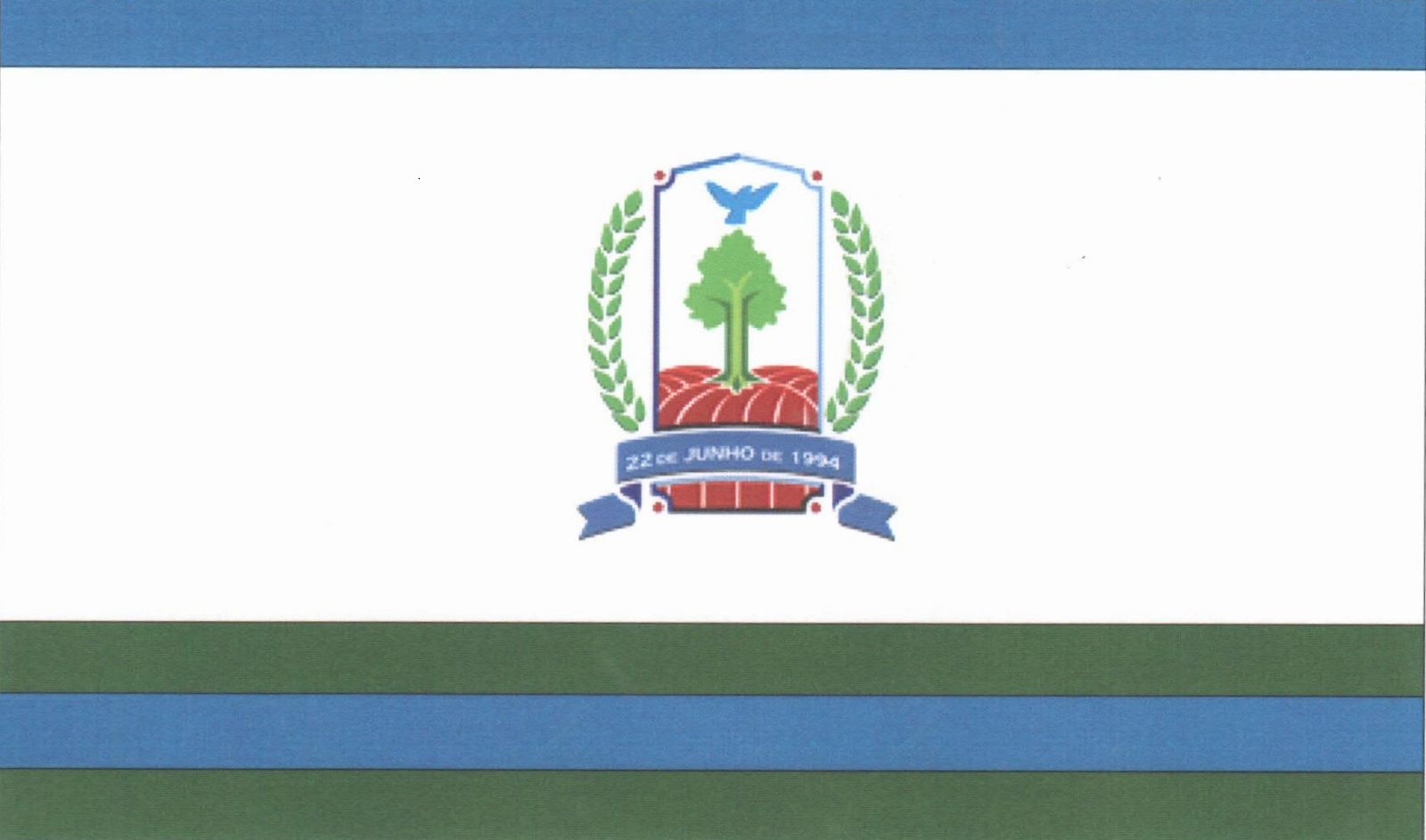
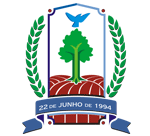
- Flag Coat of arms

- Location in Rondônia state

- Location in Brazil
- Coordinates: 9°21′46″S 62°35′7″W
- Country: Brazil
- Region: North
- State: Rondônia

Area
  - Total: 3,864 km^{2} (1,492 sq mi)

Population (2020)
  - Total: 26,183
  - Density: 6.776/km^{2} (17.55/sq mi)
- Time zone: UTC−4 (AMT)

Cujubim is a municipality located in the Brazilian state of Rondônia. Its population was 26,183 (2020) and its area is 3,864 km^{2}.

The municipality contains 22% of the Angelim Extractive Reserve and 21% of the Ipê Extractive Reserve. It contains the 660 hectares (1,600 acres) Tucano Sustainable Yield State Forest, created in 1996.

== See also ==
- List of municipalities in Rondônia
