= Maracanã =

Maracanã most commonly refers to the Maracanã Stadium in Rio de Janeiro, Brazil. It may also refer to:

== People ==
- Arlindo Maracanã (born 1978), Brazilian footballer
- Carlinhos Maracanã (1957–2023), Brazilian footballer
- Domingos Maracanã (born 1961), Brazilian volleyball player

== Places ==
- Maracanã, Rio de Janeiro, a neighborhood in Rio de Janeiro, Brazil
- Maracanã River (Rio de Janeiro), Brazil, a river located in Maracanã neighborhood
- Maracanã, Pará, a Brazilian municipality located in Pará state
- Maracanã River (Amazonas), Brazil

== Sports ==
- C.D. Maracaná San Rafael, a football club based in San Rafael Obrajuelo, El Salvador
- Maracanã Esporte Clube, a Brazilian football club
- Maracanã Stadium (Estádio do Maracanã), a stadium located in the Maracanã neighborhood, Rio de Janeiro, Brazil
- Ginásio do Maracanãzinho, an indoor sporting arena, located in the Maracanã neighborhood, near the stadium
- Estadio Parque Maracaná, a football stadium in Montevideo, Uruguay
- Estadio Maracaná, a football stadium in Panama City, Panama
- Marakana (Maracana) Stadium, a stadium located in Belgrade, Serbia

== Other uses ==
- The red-shouldered macaw, a bird known in Brazil as maracanã
- Mini-macaws are known as maracanã in Portuguese
