= Magalhães Barata, Pará =

Magalhães Barata
- Municipality
- Location in Brazil Magalhães Barata (Brazil)
- Coordinates: 0.795°S 47.5978°W
- Country: Brazil
- Region: Northern
- State: Pará
- Mesoregion: Nordeste Paraense

Population (2020)
  - Total: 8,573
- Time zone: UTC−3 (BRT)

Magalhães Barata is a municipality in the state of Pará in the Northern region of Brazil.

The municipality contains the 11,037-hectare (27,270-acre) Cuinarana Marine Extractive Reserve, created in 2014. The Cuinarana River originates near the municipal headquarters. It flows north to join the Marapanim River near the Atlantic coast. It is protected by the Maracanã Marine Extractive Reserve on the east and the Cuinarana Marine Extractive Reserve on the west.

== History ==
As early as 1936, there existed in the city of Marapanim the district of Cuinarana, which on December 29, 1961, was elevated to the status of municipality, gaining the name of Magalhães Barata, in honor of the former governor of the state of Pará, by state law nº 2.460.

== Notable people ==
- Rony Football player

== See also ==
- List of municipalities in Pará
