= Maracanã River =

Maracanã River may refer to:

- Maracanã River (Amazonas), Brazil
- Maracanã River (Pará), Brazil
- Maracanã River (Rio de Janeiro), Brazil

== See also ==
- Maracanã (disambiguation)
