= Mocajuba River =

- Location within Brazil
- Native name: Rio Mocajuba (Portuguese)

Location
- Country: Brazil

Physical characteristics
- Mouth
  - coordinates: 0.692099°S 47.976960°W

Basin features
- Tributaries
  - left: Barreto River

The Mocajuba River (Portuguese: Rio Mocajuba) is a short river in the state of Pará, Brazil. It empties into the Atlantic Ocean.

== Course ==
The village of São João da Ponta lies on the left bank of the river. The Mocajuba River flows north past the Mocapajuba Marine Extractive Reserve to the west and the São João da Ponta Extractive Reserve to the southeast and the Mãe Grande de Curuçá Extractive Reserve to the east. An arm of the river, the Furo Maripanema, flows northeast and joins the Curuçá River.

== Environment ==
Vegetation around the Rio Macajuba is almost all forest. The area around Rio Macajuba has low population with 19 people per square kilometre. The area has a monsoon climate. The average temperature is 23 °C (73 °F). The hottest month is July, with 24 °C (75 °F) and the coldest month is February, at 22 °C (72 °F). The rainfall averages 3,146 millimetres (123.9 in) per year. The wettest month is March, with 699 millimetres (27.5 in) and the driest month is October, with 12 millimetres (0.47 in).

== See also ==
- List of rivers of Pará

== Sources ==
- RESEX Marinha Mocapajuba (in Portuguese), ISA: Instituto Socioambiental
