= Caeté (disambiguation) =

Caeté is a municipality in Minas Gerais, Brazil.

Caeté or Caetés may also refer to:

- Caeté people, an indigenous people of Brazil
- Caeté River (Acre), Brazil
- Caeté River (Pará), Brazil
- Caeté-Taperaçu Marine Extractive Reserve
- Caetés, Pernambuco, a municipality in Pernambuco, Brazil
