= Piriá River =

Piriá River may refer to

- Piriá River (Marajó), a river on Marajó Island in Brazil
- Piriá River (Eastern Pará), a river in the extreme east of the state of Pará, Brazil, that flows into the Atlantic Ocean
