= 2014 Campeonato Brasileiro Série B =

Campeonato Brasileiro Série B
- Official logo.
- Season: 2014
- Champions: Joinville (1st title)
- Promoted: Joinville; Ponte Preta; Vasco da Gama; Avaí
- Relegated: América-RN; Icasa; Portuguesa; Vila Nova
- Matches: 380
- Goals: 922 (2.43 per match)
- Top goalscorer: Magno Alves (18 goals)
- Biggest away win: Vasco da Gama 0−5 Avaí (August 30, 2014)

The Serie B of the Brazilian Championship 2014 is a football competition held in Brazil, equivalent to the second division. It is contested by 20 clubs, between April 18 and November 28. The top four teams will be promoted to Série A in 2015 and the last four will be relegated to Série C in 2015.

The games had a break during the 2014 FIFA World Cup, which was held between June and July in Brazil.

== Teams ==
=== Stadium and locations ===
Locations of the 2014 Série B teams.

Team	Home city	Stadium	Capacity	2013 season
ABC	Natal	Frasqueirão	15,082	14th in Série B
América Mineiro	Belo Horizonte	Independência	23,000	9th in Série B
América de Natal	Natal	Arena das Dunas	42,086	13th in Série B
Atlético Goianiense	Goiânia	Serra Dourada	41,574	16th in Série B
Avaí	Florianópolis	Ressacada	17,537	10th in Série B
Boa Esporte	Varginha	Melão	15,471	11th in Série B
Bragantino	Bragança Paulista	Nabi Abi Chedid	17,022	12th in Série B
Ceará	Fortaleza	Castelão	67,037	7th in Série B
Icasa	Juazeiro do Norte	Romeirão	16,000	5th in Série B
Joinville	Joinville	Arena Joinville	22,400	6th in Série B
Luverdense	Lucas do Rio Verde	Passo das Emas	10,000	3rd in Série C
Náutico	Recife	Arena Pernambuco	46,154	20th in Série A
Oeste	Itápolis	Amaros	13,044	15th in Série B
Paraná	Curitiba	Vila Capanema	20,083	8th in Série B
Ponte Preta	Campinas	Moisés Lucarelli	19,722	19th in Série A
Portuguesa	São Paulo	Canindé	21,004	17th in Série A
Sampaio Corrêa	São Luís	Castelão	40,000	2nd in Série C
Santa Cruz	Recife	Arruda	60,044	1st in Série C
Vasco da Gama	Rio de Janeiro	São Januário	22,150	18th in Série A
Vila Nova	Goiânia	Serra Dourada	41,574	4th in Série C

=== Number of teams by state ===
Number of teams	State	Team(s)
4	São Paulo	Bragantino, Oeste, Ponte Preta and Portuguesa
2	Ceará	Ceará and Icasa
2	Goiás	Atlético Goianiense and Vila Nova
2	Minas Gerais	América Mineiro and Boa Esporte
2	Pernambuco	Náutico and Santa Cruz
2	Rio Grande do Norte	ABC and América de Natal
2	Santa Catarina	Avaí and Joinville
1	Maranhão	Sampaio Corrêa
1	Mato Grosso	Luverdense
1	Paraná	Paraná
1	Rio de Janeiro	Vasco da Gama

=== Personnel and kits ===
Team	Manager	Captain	Kit manufacturer	Shirt sponsor
ABC	(Brazil) Roberto Fonseca	(Brazil) Gilvan	Lupo	Caixa; EMS
América (MG)	(Brazil) Givanildo Oliveira	(Brazil) Renato Santos	Lupo	Supermercados BH; Banco BMG
América (RN)	(Brazil) Roberto Fernandes	(Brazil) Edson Rocha	Kappa	Caixa
Atlético Goianiense	(Japan) Wagner Lopes	(Brazil) Márcio	Super Bolla	Caixa
Avaí	(Brazil) Geninho	(Brazil) Marquinhos	Fila	Caixa
Boa Esporte	(Brazil) Nedo Xavier	(Brazil) Francismar	Kanxa	
Bragantino	(Brazil) André Gaspar		Kanxa	Claro
Ceará	(Brazil) PC Gusmão	(Brazil) Anderson	Penalty	Quartzolit; Cimento Apodi
Icasa	(Brazil) Vladimir de Jesus		Kanxa	Nacional Gás
Joinville	(Brazil) Hemerson Maria	Marcelo Costa	Umbro	Romaço Rolamentos
Luverdense	(Brazil) Maico Gaúcho	(Brazil) Zé Roberto	Umbro	Sicredi
Náutico	(Brazil) Dado Cavalcanti	(Brazil) Elicarlos	Umbro	
Oeste	(Brazil) Roberto Cavalo	(Brazil) Adriano	Kanxa	Claro
Paraná	(Brazil) Ricardinho	(Brazil) Lúcio Flávio	Erreà	Caixa
Ponte Preta	(Brazil) Guto Ferreira	(Brazil) Vanderson	Pulse	Hitachi
Portuguesa	(Brazil) Zé Augusto	(Brazil) Valdomiro	Lupo	DL Tablet
Sampaio Corrêa	(Brazil) Vinícius Saldanha	(Brazil) Arlindo Maracanã	Super Bolla	
Santa Cruz	(Brazil) Oliveira Canindé	(Brazil) Tiago Cardoso	Penalty	Votomassa; Cimento Poty
Vasco	(Brazil) Joel Santana	(Argentina) Pablo Guiñazú	Penalty	Caixa
Vila Nova	(Brazil) Wladimir Araújo	(Brazil) Neto Gaúcho	Finta	

== League table ==
Pos	Team	Pld	W	D	L	GF	GA	GD	Pts	Promotion or relegation
1	Joinville (P, C)	38	21	7	10	54	33	+21	70	Promotion to 2015 Série A
2	Ponte Preta (P)	38	19	12	7	61	38	+23	69	Promotion to 2015 Série A
3	Vasco da Gama (P)	38	16	15	7	50	36	+14	63	Promotion to 2015 Série A
4	Avaí (P)	38	18	8	12	47	40	+7	62	Promotion to 2015 Série A
5	América-MG	38	20	7	11	59	39	+20	61 (Note: América-MG deducted 6 points for lining up an irregular player)	
6	Boa Esporte	38	18	5	15	51	48	+3	59	
7	Atlético Goianiense	38	17	8	13	54	49	+5	59	
8	Ceará	38	16	9	13	58	53	+5	57	
9	Santa Cruz	38	14	13	11	51	38	+13	55	
10	Sampaio Corrêa	38	13	14	11	54	46	+8	53	
11	Paraná	38	13	12	13	45	43	+2	51	
12	Luverdense	38	15	5	18	40	46	−6	50	
13	Náutico	38	14	8	16	40	47	−7	50	
14	ABC	38	14	6	18	34	40	−6	48	
15	Oeste	38	12	12	14	39	48	−9	48	
16	Bragantino	38	13	7	18	45	55	−10	46	
17	América-RN (R)	38	12	7	19	44	53	−9	43	Relegation to 2015 Série C
18	Icasa (R)	38	11	10	17	34	43	−9	43	Relegation to 2015 Série C
19	Vila Nova (R)	38	10	2	26	35	70	−35	32	Relegation to 2015 Série C
20	Portuguesa (R)	38	4	13	21	29	59	−30	25	Relegation to 2015 Série C

Updated to match(es) played on 15 November 2014. Source: CBF
Rules for classification: 1st points; 2nd wins; 3rd goal difference; 4th goals scored; 5th head-to-head results; 6th least red cards received; 7th least yellow cards received; 8th draw.
(C) Champions; (P) Promoted; (R) Relegated

== Results ==
Home \ Away	ABC	AMG	ARN	ATG	AVA	BOA	BRG	CEA	ICA	JOI	LUV	NAU	OES	PAR	PON	POR	SAM	STC	VAS	VIL
ABC			0–0			1–0			3–0	2–1		1–1	0–1			0–0	1–0	2–1	1–2	0–2
América-MG	1–0					0–2		3–0		3–1	2–0	1–3	3–0	1–0	3–0				2–3	2–0
América-RN	0–2	1–0		3–3	3–1		4–2	0–1			2–0		0–1	2–3	0–2			0–1		
Atlético Goianiense	2–0	3–0				0–3		0–2		0–0		2–0	4–2	2–1	2–2		2–4		1–1	
Avaí	0–1	2–0	0–0	2–1			1–2	1–1			1–2			2–1	1–0			0–0		2–1
Boa Esporte	0–0	1–3	3–2	1–1	2–0		2–1		2–0							2–1	2–1	0–2	0–2	
Bragantino	1–0	0–2		2–1	1–4			1–2		1–0		2–2	3–0			2–2	0–1		1–1	
Ceará	1–2	5–2				2–2			2–1	1–3	3–1	2–2	1–0	2–1	3–2					4–0
Icasa		2–0	0–2	1–0	0–2		3–0			1–1					0–1	2–0	0–3	1–1	1–1	
Joinville			1–0		0–1	2–1			2–1			1–0	2–1	3–0		3–0	3–1		0–0	1–0
Luverdense	3–1			0–2		4–2	2–0		1–0	2–2		0–2			0–1	3–1			2–1	2–0
Náutico			2–1		0–1	1–3	0–0	2–1	1–0				3–2			2–1	1–0		0–1	2–0
Oeste			2–1		0–0	2–1		3–1	0–0		2–1			2–2	1–1		0–0	1–1		1–3
Paraná	1–0					0–0	1–0		1–0	2–3	0–2	2–0			1–2		0–0	3–2		3–1
Ponte Preta	2–1			3–4		1–0	1–0		1–1	2–0	2–2	2–0				0–0			0–0	1–0
Portuguesa		2–1	1–2	2–0	1–3		1–3	1–1		1–2			0–0	1–1			1–4	1–1		
Sampaio Corrêa		0–0	3–0		1–1			2–2	3–2		1–0		2–2	0–2	3–3			0–0		2–0
Santa Cruz	1–1	1–1		2–0				2–3		2–0	0–0	3–0		1–1	2–1	1–0				
Vasco da Gama		1–1	1–1	3–0	0–5			2–0			2–0		2–0	1–0		1–1	1–1	4–1		
Vila Nova			1–3	0–2	0–1	0–2	1–1		0–1		0–0	0–1				1–2		3–2	2–1	

Updated to match(es) played on 14 September 2014. Source: CBF
Legend: Blue = home team win; Yellow = draw; Red = away team win.

== Top goalscorers ==
Rank	Player	Club	Goals
1	(Brazil) Magno Alves	Ceará	18
2	(Brazil) Rodrigo Pimpão	América-RN	15
2	(Brazil) Tomas	Boa Esporte	15
4	(Brazil) Léo Gamalho	Santa Cruz	13
4	(Brazil) Obina	América-MG	13
6	(Brazil) Alexandro	Ponte Preta	12
6	(Brazil) Edigar Junio	Joinville	12
6	(Brazil) Jael	Joinville	12
9	(Brazil) Fernando Karanga	Boa Esporte	11

Source: CBF
