= Piria =

Piria may refer to:

- Piria, a village in the commune Argetoaia, Dolj County, Romania
- Piriá River (Marajó), a river on Marajó Island in Brazil
- Piriá River (Eastern Pará), a river in the extreme east of the state of Pará, Brazil, that flows into the Atlantic Ocean
- Raffaele Piria, a 19th-century Italian chemist
  - the Piria reaction of aromatic nitro compounds
- Vicky Piria, an Italian racing driver
- Piria, termine dialettale friulano e bisiaco (Friuli-Venezia Giulia)
