= São João da Ponta Extractive Reserve =

Protected area in Pará, Brazil

- Reserva Extrativista de São João da Ponta
- IUCN category VI (protected area with sustainable use of natural resources)
- Location within Brazil
- Nearest city: São João da Ponta, Pará
- Coordinates: 0°48′15″S 47°57′40″W
- Area: 3,203 hectares (7,910 acres)
- Designation: Extractive reserve
- Administrator: Chico Mendes Institute for Biodiversity Conservation

The São João da Ponta Extractive Reserve (Portuguese: Reserva Extrativista de São João da Ponta) is a coastal marine extractive reserve in the state of Pará, Brazil.

== Location ==
Conservation units northeast of Belém: 7. São João da Ponta Extractive Reserve

The São João da Ponta Extractive Reserve is in the municipality of São João da Ponta, Pará. It has an area of 3,203 hectares (7,910 acres). It lies along the east shore of the Barreto River and the west shore of the Mocajuba River, upstream from the islands of the delta formed by these two rivers. The Mocapajuba Marine Extractive Reserve is to the west and the Mãe Grande de Curuçá Extractive Reserve is to the east.

== Environment ==
Average annual rainfall is 2,000 millimetres (79 in) Temperatures range from 22 to 30 °C (72 to 86 °F) with an average of 25 °C (77 °F). Altitudes range from 15 to 34 metres (49 to 112 ft) above sea level.

Birds include the small and large great egret (Ardea alba), garça morena; colhereiro; small and large maçarico; marreca; pica pau; saracura; socó boi; taqueré; piaçoca; guará; maguari; gavião; and ariramba. Crustaceans include caranguejo; siri, camarões; and craca. Mollusks are caramujo do mangue; mexilhões, sapequara, turú, and ostra. Mammals include the boto; guaxinim; quati; tamanduá. Fish include the pescada branca; tainha; sardinha; camurim, corvina; acari; bandeirado; caíca; dourada; peixe pedra; amoré; bagre; and tralhoto. Reptiles include tartarugas; jíboia; sucuri and surucucu. The West Indian manatee (Trichechus manatus) is a protected species in the reserve.

== History ==
The São João da Ponta Extractive Reserve was created by federal decree on 13 December 2002. The reserve is classed as IUCN protected area category VI (protected area with sustainable use of natural resources). The objectives is to protect the livelihoods and culture of the traditional extractive communities of the region, and ensure sustainable use of the natural resources. It is administered by the Chico Mendes Institute for Biodiversity Conservation (ICMBio).

On 22 June 2005 INCRA recognised the reserve as supporting 350 families of small rural producers, who would be eligible for PRONAF support. This was revised to 1,250 families on 5 January 2008. The consultative council was created on 5 February 2007. On 23 March 2010 ICMBio granted use of the reserve to the Association of Users of the São João da Ponta Extractive Reserve.

== Sources ==
- Resex de São João da Ponta (in Portuguese), ICMBio: Chico Mendes Institute for Biodiversity Conservation
- RESEX de São João da Ponta (in Portuguese), ISA: Instituto Socioambiental
- Unidade de Conservação: Reserva Extrativista do São João da Ponta (in Portuguese), MMA: Ministério do Meio Ambiente
