= Curuçá River =

Curuçá River may refer to:

- Curuçá River (Javari River), a river in the state of Amazonas, Brazil
- Curuçá River (Pará), a river in the state of Pará, Brazil
