= Mãe Grande de Curuçá Extractive Reserve =

Protected area in Pará, Brazil

- Reserva Extrativista Mãe Grande de Curuçá
- IUCN category VI (protected area with sustainable use of natural resources)
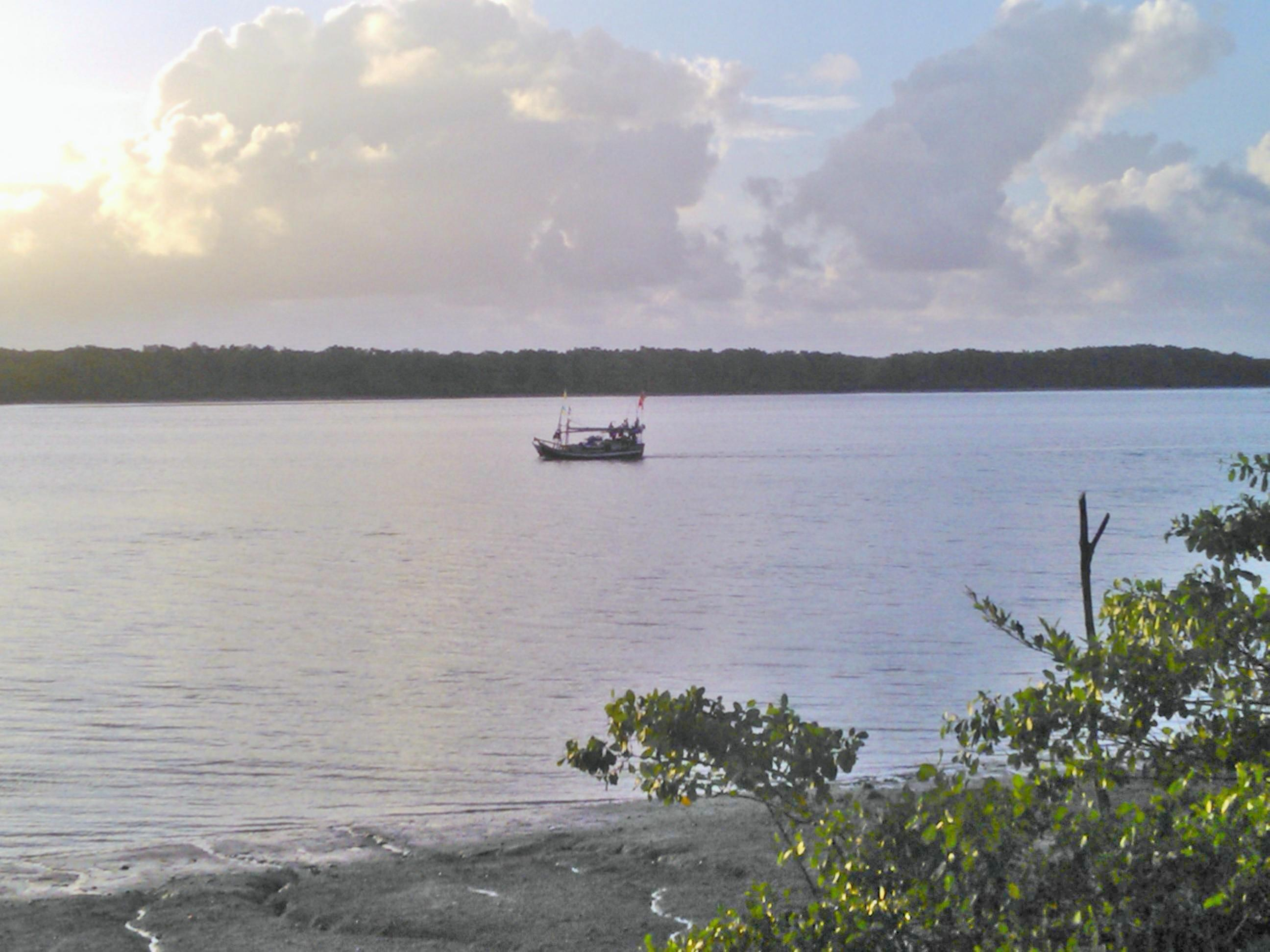
- Fishing boat in Curuçá

- Location within Brazil
- Coordinates: 0°38′51″S 47°50′31″W
- Area: 37,062 hectares (91,580 acres)
- Designation: Extractive reserve
- Created: 13 December 2002
- Administrator: ICMBio

The Mãe Grande de Curuçá Extractive Reserve (Portuguese: Reserva Extrativista Mãe Grande de Curuçá) is a coastal marine extractive reserve in the state of Pará, Brazil.

== Location ==
Conservation units northeast of Belém: 8. Mãe Grande de Curuçá Extractive Reserve

The Mãe Grande de Curuçá Extractive Reserve is in the municipality of Curuçá, Pará. It has an area of 37,062 hectares (91,580 acres). The Curuçá River flows through the reserve from south to north, emptying into the Atlantic Ocean. It is joined from the left by the Furo Maripanema, an arm of the Mocajuba River. The reserve adjoins the Mocapajuba Marine Extractive Reserve and São João da Ponta Extractive Reserve to the west, and the Cuinarana Marine Extractive Reserve and Mestre Lucindo Marine Extractive Reserve to the east.

The climate is humid tropical, with an average temperature of about 27 °C (81 °F). The rainy season is from January to August. The reserve contains typical mangrove, salt marsh and riparian vegetation. Vegetation is mostly secondary, due to intense deforestation, with mangroves along the coasts. The West Indian manatee (Trichechus manatus) is a protected species in the reserve.

== Economy ==
As of 2007 the reserve was inhabited by about 3,000 families with about 6,000 fishermen in 50 small communities on islands, channels, rivers and beaches. As of 2010 there were about 11,000 residents in total. The main festival is the religious Feast of Saint Peter.

== History ==
Curuçá was founded in 1775, but only became a city in 1895. Some of the municipality was split off into separate municipalities in 1939, 1955 and 1991. The Mãe Grande de Curuçá Extractive Reserve was created by federal decree on 13 December 2002. It is classed as IUCN protected area category VI (protected area with sustainable use of natural resources). The objective is to protect the livelihoods and culture of the traditional extractive population, and ensure the sustainable use of natural resources of the unit.

On 22 June 2005 the Instituto Nacional de Colonização e Reforma Agrária (INCRA: National Institute for Colonization and Agrarian Reform) recognised the reserve as meeting the needs of 1,600 families of small rural producers, who would qualify for PRONAF support. The Brazilian Institute of Environment and Renewable Natural Resources (IBAMA) created the deliberative council on 9 March 2006 with the aim of helping to create and implement the management plan and to make the reserve a reality. On 23 March 2010 responsibility was transferred to the Chico Mendes Institute for Biodiversity Conservation (ICMBio). The same day ICMBio granted the right of use to the Users' Association of the reserve (Associação dos Usuários da Reserva Extrativista Mãe Grande de Curuçá - AUREMAG).

== Sources ==
- Resex Mãe Grande de Curuçá (in Portuguese), ICMBio: Chico Mendes Institute for Biodiversity Conservation
- RESEX Mãe Grande de Curuçá (in Portuguese), ISA: Instituto Socioambiental
- Unidade de Conservação: Reserva Extrativista Mãe Grande de Curuçá (in Portuguese), MMA: Ministério do Meio Ambiente
