= Santarém Novo =

Municipality in Pará, Brazil

Coordinates: 0°56′S 47°23′W

- Municipality
- Location in Pará
- Country: Brazil
- Region: Northern
- State: Pará
- Mesoregion: Nordeste Paraense

Population (2022)
  - Total: 6,116
- Time zone: UTC−3 (BRT)

Santarém Novo (English: New Santarem) is a municipality in the state of Pará in the Northern region of Brazil.

The municipality contains the 2,786-hectare (6,880-acre) Chocoaré - Mato Grosso Extractive Reserve, created in 2002, which protects part of the right (east) shore of the Maracanã River.

== See also ==
- List of municipalities in Pará
