= Mocapajuba Marine Extractive Reserve =

Protected area in Pará, Brazil

- Reserva Extrativista Marinha Mocapajuba
- IUCN category VI (protected area with sustainable use of natural resources)
- Location within Brazil
- Nearest city: São Caetano de Odivelas, Pará
- Coordinates: 0°42′09″S 48°01′15″W
- Area: 21,029 hectares (51,960 acres)
- Designation: Extractive reserve
- Created: 10 October 2014
- Administrator: ICMBio

The Mocapajuba Marine Extractive Reserve (Portuguese: Reserva Extrativista Marinha Mocapajuba) is a coastal marine extractive reserve in the state of Pará, Brazil.

== Location ==
Conservation units northeast of Belém: 6. Mocapajuba Marine Extractive Reserve

The Mocapajuba Marine Extractive Reserve is in the municipality of São Caetano de Odivelas, Pará. It has an area of 21,029 hectares (51,960 acres). The reserve covers the mangroves in the São Caetano de Odivelas peninsula and islands of the coastal delta formed by the Barreto and Mocajuba rivers. It adjoins the São João da Ponta Extractive Reserve to the southeast and the Mãe Grande de Curuçá Extractive Reserve to the east.

== History ==
The Mocapajuba Marine Extractive Reserve was created by federal decree on 10 October 2014 with an area of about 21,029 hectares (51,960 acres). The reserve is one of three created by president Dilma Rousseff thirteen days before the 2014 presidential elections. The other two are the Mestre Lucindo and Cuinarana marine extractive reserves, both also in Pará. The Araí-Peroba Marine Extractive Reserve was expanded by 50,500 hectares (125,000 acres).

The reserve is administered by the Chico Mendes Institute for Biodiversity Conservation (ICMBio). It is classed as IUCN protected area category VI (protected area with sustainable use of natural resources) The objectives are to conserve biodiversity of the ecosystems of mangroves, salt marshes, dunes, wetlands, floodplains, rivers, estuaries and islands and ensure sustainable use of natural resources while protecting the livelihoods and culture of the traditional extractive communities of the region.

== Sources ==
- Daniele Bragança (13 October 2014), "Em plena campanha, Dilma cria novas UCs na Amazônia", O Eco
- RESEX Marinha Mocapajuba (in Portuguese), ICMBio: Chico Mendes Institute for Biodiversity Conservation
- RESEX Marinha Mocapajuba (in Portuguese), ISA: Instituto Socioambiental
- Unidade de Conservação: Reserva Extrativista Marinha Mocapajuba (in Portuguese), MMA: Ministério do Meio Ambiente
