= Barreto River =

- Location within Brazil
- Native name: Rio Barreto (Portuguese)

Location
- Country: Brazil

Physical characteristics
- Mouth
  - location: São João da Ponta, Pará
  - coordinates: 0.702146°S 47.995763°W

The Barreto River (Portuguese: Rio Barreto) is a river in the state of Pará, Brazil. The river enters the Atlantic Ocean in the municipality of São João da Ponta, Pará.

== Course ==
The Barreto River divides the São João da Ponta Extractive Reserve to the east from the Mocapajuba Marine Extractive Reserve to the west. It flows past the village of São Caetano de Odivelas on its left (west) bank.

== Environment ==
The mouth of Rio Barreto mostly flows through mud flats. In this region there is a relatively low population of about 23 people per square kilometer. The region has a monsoon climate. The average temperature is 23 °C (73 °F). The hottest month is September at 24 °C (75 °F) and the coldest month is February at 22 °C (72 °F). Rainfall averages 3,146 millimetres (123.9 in) annually. The wettest month is March with 699 millimetres (27.5 in) and the driest month is October with 12 millimetres (0.47 in).

== See also ==
- List of rivers of Pará

== Sources ==
- RESEX de São João da Ponta (in Portuguese), ISA: Instituto Socioambiental
