= Chocoaré - Mato Grosso Extractive Reserve =

Extractive reserve in Pará, Brazil

- Reserva Extrativista Chocoaré - Mato Grosso
- IUCN category VI (protected area with sustainable use of natural resources)
- Location within Brazil
- Nearest city: Santarém Novo, Pará
- Coordinates: 0.896479°S 47.411027°W
- Area: 2,786 hectares (6,880 acres)
- Designation: Extractive reserve
- Created: 13 December 2002
- Administrator: Chico Mendes Institute for Biodiversity Conservation

The Chocoaré - Mato Grosso Extractive Reserve (Portuguese: Reserva Extrativista Chocoaré - Mato Grosso is an extractive reserve in the state of Pará, Brazil.

== Location ==
Conservation units northeast of Belém: 13. Chocoaré - Mato Grosso Extractive Reserve

The Chocoaré - Mato Grosso Extractive Reserve is in the municipality of Santarém Novo, Pará. It has an area of 2,786 hectares (6,880 acres). It protects part of the right (east) shore of the Maracanã River. The Maracanã Marine Extractive Reserve protects the left (west) bank, and extends further north. Vegetation in the alluvial areas is mangrove. The local people harvest crabs as a source of income. The West Indian manatee (Trichechus manatus) is protected in the reserve.

== History ==
The Chocoaré - Mato Grosso Extractive Reserve was created by federal decree on 13 December 2002. It is administered by the Chico Mendes Institute for Biodiversity Conservation (ICMbio). The reserve is classed as IUCN protected area category VI (protected area with sustainable use of natural resources). Its objectives are to protect the livelihoods and culture of the traditional extractive population, and ensure sustainable use of natural resources.

On 22 June 2005 the Instituto Nacional de Colonização e Reforma Agrária (INCRA: National Institute for Colonization and Agrarian Reform) recognised it as meeting the needs of 300 families of small rural producers, who would qualify for PRONAF support. The consultative council was created on 24 September 2007. ICMBio was given responsibility on 15 March 2010.

== Sources ==
- Resex Chocoaré- Mato Grosso (in Portuguese), ICMBio: Chico Mendes Institute for Biodiversity Conservation
- RESEX Chocoaré - Mato Grosso (in Portuguese), ISA: Instituto Socioambiental
- Unidade de Conservação: Reserva Extrativista Chocoaré - Mato Grosso (in Portuguese), MMA: Ministério do Meio Ambiente
