= Cuinarana River =

- Location within Brazil
- Native name: Rio Cuinarana (Portuguese)

Location
- Country: Brazil

Physical characteristics
- Mouth
  - coordinates: 0.697349°S 47.609552°W

Basin features
- River system: Marapanim River

The Cuinarana River (Portuguese: Rio Cuinarana) is a river in the state of Pará, Brazil, a tributary of the Marapanim River.

== Course ==
The river originates near the village of Magalhães Barata, and flows north to the point where it enters the Marapanim River. The mangroves of the east side of the Cuinarana River are protected by the Maracanã Marine Extractive Reserve. On the west side the mangroves are protected by the Cuinarana Marine Extractive Reserve. The west bank of the Marapanim River, and the peninsula to the left of the mouth of the estuary formed by the Marapanim and Cuinarana rivers is protected by the Mestre Lucindo Marine Extractive Reserve.

== Environment ==
The mouth of the river is mainly mud flats. The area around Rio Cuinarana has a low population, with about 18 people per square kilometre. The area has a monsoon climate. The average temperature is 24 °C (75 °F). The hottest month is September at 25 °C (77 °F) and the coldest month is January at 22 °C (72 °F). Rainfall averages 3,146 millimetres (123.9 in) annually. The wettest month is March with 699 millimetres (27.5 in) and the driest is October with 12 millimetres (0.47 in).

== See also ==
- List of rivers of Pará

== Sources ==
- RESEX Marinha Cuinarana (in Portuguese), ISA: Instituto Socioambiental
- RESEX Marinha do Maracanã (in Portuguese), ISA: Instituto Socioambiental
- RESEX Marinha Mestre Lucindo (in Portuguese), ISA: Instituto Socioambiental
