= São Caetano de Odivelas =

- Municipality
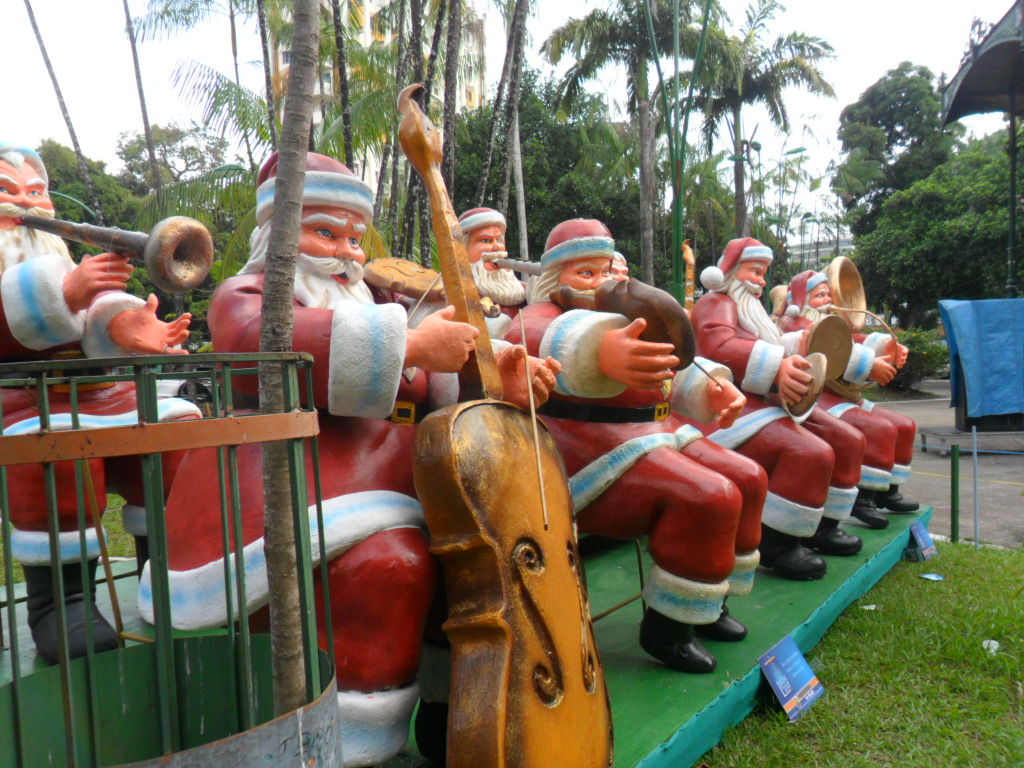
- Santa Claus orchestra in Park of the Republic

- Flag Coat of arms

- Location in Brazil São Caetano de Odivelas (Brazil)
- Coordinates: 0°45′S 48°02′W
- Country: Brazil
- Region: Northern
- State: Pará
- Mesoregion: Nordeste Paraense

Population (2020)
  - Total: 18,129
- Time zone: UTC−3 (BRT)

São Caetano de Odivelas is a municipality in the state of Pará in the Northern region of Brazil.

The municipal seat lies on the left (west) bank of the Barreto River. It contains the 21,029-hectare (51,960-acre) Mocapajuba Marine Extractive Reserve, created in 2014.

== See also ==
- List of municipalities in Pará
