= Mestre Lucindo Marine Extractive Reserve =

Extractive reserve in Pará, Brazil

- Reserva Extrativista Marinha Mestre Lucindo
- IUCN category VI (protected area with sustainable use of natural resources)
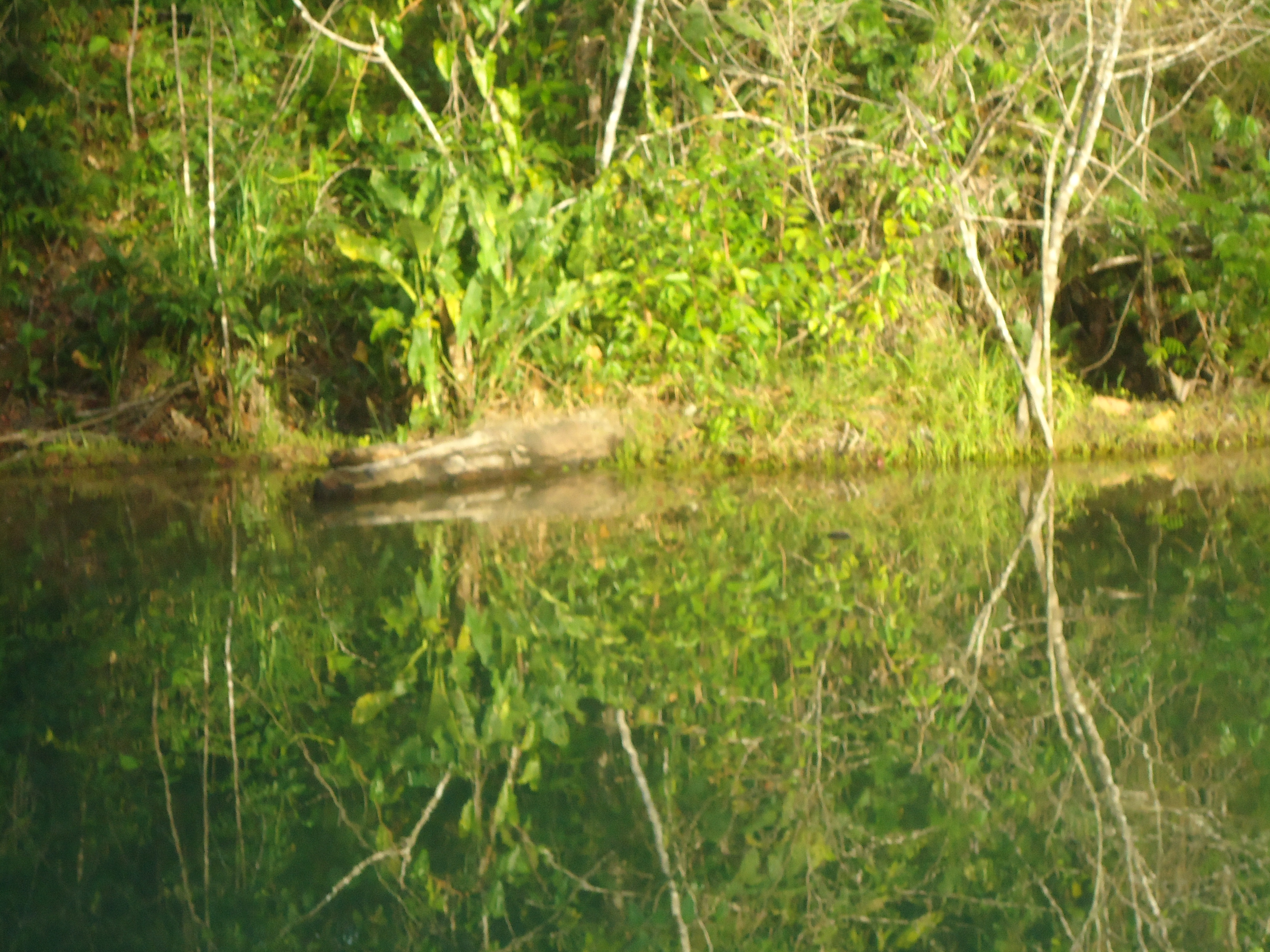
- Stream in Marapanim

- Location within Brazil
- Nearest city: Marapanim, Pará
- Coordinates: 0°35′49″S 47°43′26″W
- Area: 26,465 hectares (65,400 acres)
- Designation: Extractive reserve
- Created: 10 October 2014
- Administrator: Chico Mendes Institute for Biodiversity Conservation

The Mestre Lucindo Marine Extractive Reserve (Portuguese: Reserva Extrativista Marinha Mestre Lucindo) is a coastal marine extractive reserve in the state of Pará, Brazil.

== Location ==
Conservation units northeast of Belém: 9. Mestre Lucindo Marine Extractive Reserve

The Mestre Lucindo Marine Extractive Reserve is located in the municipality of Marapanim, Pará. It has an area of 26,465 hectares (65,400 acres). It protects the west bank of the Marapanim River, and the peninsula to the left of the mouth of the estuary formed by the Marapanim and Cuinarana rivers. The reserve lies on both sides of the coastal towns of Marapanim and Marudá. It adjoins the Mãe Grande de Curuçá Extractive Reserve to the west and the Maracanã Marine Extractive Reserve and the Algodoal-Maiandeua Environmental Protection Area to the east.

== History ==
The Mestre Lucindo Marine Extractive Reserve was created by federal decree on 10 October 2014 with an area of 25,465 hectares (62,930 acres). The reserve is one of three created by president Dilma Rousseff thirteen days before the 2014 presidential elections. The other two are the Mocapajuba and Cuinarana marine extractive reserves, both also in Pará. The Araí-Peroba Marine Extractive Reserve was expanded by 50,500 hectares (125,000 acres).

The reserve is administered by the Chico Mendes Institute for Biodiversity Conservation (ICMBio). It is classed as IUCN protected area category VI (protected area with sustainable use of natural resources). The objective is to conserve the biodiversity of the ecosystems of mangroves, salt marshes, dunes, wetlands, floodplains, rivers, estuaries and islands; and to protect the livelihoods and culture of the traditional extractive population, and ensure the sustainable use of natural resources of the unit.

== Sources ==
- Daniele Bragança (13 October 2014), "Em plena campanha, Dilma cria novas UCs na Amazônia", O Eco
- Resex Marinha Mestre Lucindo (in Portuguese), ICMBio: Chico Mendes Institute for Biodiversity Conservation
- RESEX Marinha Mestre Lucindo (in Portuguese), ISA: Instituto Socioambiental
- Unidade de Conservação: Reserva Extrativista Marinha Mestre Lucindo (in Portuguese), MMA: Ministério do Meio Ambiente
