= Araí-Peroba Marine Extractive Reserve =

Extractive reserve in Pará, Brazil

- Reserva Extrativista Marinha de Araí-Peroba
- IUCN category VI (protected area with sustainable use of natural resources)
- Location within Brazil
- Coordinates: 0.991169°S 46.448117°W
- Area: 62,035 hectares (153,290 acres)
- Designation: Extractive reserve
- Created: 20 May 2005
- Administrator: Chico Mendes Institute for Biodiversity Conservation

The Araí-Peroba Marine Extractive Reserve (Portuguese: Reserva Extrativista Marinha de Araí-Peroba) is a coastal marine extractive reserve in the state of Pará, Brazil.

== Location ==
Conservation units northeast of Belém: 16. Araí-Peroba Marine Extractive Reserve

The Araí-Peroba Marine Extractive Reserve is in the municipality of Augusto Corrêa, Pará. It has an area of 62,035 hectares (153,290 acres). It protects the coast and inlets around the east of the Baía do Caeté, and around the Baía de Emboraí and Baía do Chum. It adjoins the Caeté-Taperaçu Marine Extractive Reserve to the west and the Gurupi-Piriá Marine Extractive Reserve to the east.

The mangroves include Avicennia germinans, Avicennia schaueriana, Laguncularia racemosa and Rhizophora mangle. The last is the most common. The reserve has cellular telephone coverage and electricity. The community fishes and uses non-timber products.

== History ==
The Araí-Peroba Marine Extractive Reserve was created by federal decree on 20 May 2005. The reserve is administered by the Chico Mendes Institute for Biodiversity Conservation (ICMBio). It is classed as IUCN protected area category VI (protected area with sustainable use of natural resources). An extractive reserve is an area used by traditional extractive populations whose livelihood is based on extraction, subsistence agriculture and small-scale animal raising. Its basic objectives are to protect the livelihoods and culture of these people and to ensure sustainable use of natural resources.

The reserve was recognised by the Instituto Nacional de Colonização e Reforma Agrária (INCRA: National Institute for Colonisation and Agrarian Reform) on 29 November 2005 as meeting the needs of 900 families of small rural producers, who would qualify for PRONAF support. The deliberative council was created on 12 June 2007. On 23 March 2010 ICMBio granted the users' association the right to use the reserve for twenty years. The reserve was expanded by about 50,000 hectares (120,000 acres) by decree on 10 October 2014. The expansion was authorised by president Dilma Rousseff thirteen days before the 2014 presidential elections. On the same day she created the Mocapajuba, Mestre Lucindo and Cuinarana marine extractive reserves, also in Pará.

== Sources ==
- Daniele Bragança (13 October 2014), "Em plena campanha, Dilma cria novas UCs na Amazônia", O Eco
- Resex Araí Peroba, ICMBio: Chico Mendes Institute for Biodiversity Conservation
- RESEX Marinha de Araí-Peroba (in Portuguese), ISA: Instituto Socioambiental
- Unidade de Conservação: Reserva Extrativista Marinha de Araí-Peroba (in Portuguese), MMA: Ministério do Meio Ambiente
