= Tracuateua =

Coordinates: 1°05′S 46°54′W

- Municipality
- Location in Pará
- Country: Brazil
- Region: Northern
- State: Pará
- Mesoregion: Nordeste Paraense

Population (2020)
  - Total: 31,257
- Time zone: UTC−3 (BRT)

Tracuateua is a municipality in the state of Pará in the Northern region of Brazil.

The municipality contains the larger part of the 27,864-hectare (68,850-acre) Tracuateua Marine Extractive Reserve, a sustainable use conservation unit created in 2005.

== Climate ==
The climate is tropical monsoon (Köppen: Am), with great differences in precipitation according to the seasons.

Climate data for Tracuateau (1981–2010)
Month	Jan	Feb	Mar	Apr	May	Jun	Jul	Aug	Sep	Oct	Nov	Dec	Year
Mean daily maximum °C (°F)	31.5 (88.7)	30.5 (86.9)	30.3 (86.5)	30.5 (86.9)	31.1 (88.0)	31.3 (88.3)	31.3 (88.3)	31.7 (89.1)	32.4 (90.3)	33.0 (91.4)	33.3 (91.9)	33.0 (91.4)	31.7 (89.1)
Daily mean °C (°F)	26.3 (79.3)	25.9 (78.6)	25.7 (78.3)	25.5 (77.9)	25.9 (78.6)	25.8 (78.4)	25.6 (78.1)	26.0 (78.8)	26.4 (79.5)	26.7 (80.1)	27.2 (81.0)	27.1 (80.8)	26.2 (79.2)
Mean daily minimum °C (°F)	22.0 (71.6)	22.1 (71.8)	22.0 (71.6)	22.1 (71.8)	21.8 (71.2)	21.3 (70.3)	20.8 (69.4)	20.7 (69.3)	20.6 (69.1)	20.8 (69.4)	21.3 (70.3)	21.9 (71.4)	21.5 (70.7)
Average precipitation mm (inches)	281.5 (11.08)	384.9 (15.15)	480.5 (18.92)	423.3 (16.67)	352.7 (13.89)	209.5 (8.25)	185.9 (7.32)	87.5 (3.44)	16.5 (0.65)	10.7 (0.42)	10.2 (0.40)	67.0 (2.64)	2,510.2 (98.83)
Average precipitation days (≥ 1.0 mm)	15	19	23	22	23	20	18	9	3	1	2	5	160
Average relative humidity (%)	87.1	89.5	91.2	92.3	91.3	89.5	89.2	86.3	81.5	78.7	79.4	81.6	86.5
Mean monthly sunshine hours	155.6	113.8	102.8	110.3	148.5	179.6	211.3	249.8	250.3	265.2	239.6	212.1	2,238.9
Source: Instituto Nacional de Meteorologia

== See also ==
- List of municipalities in Pará
