= Algodoal-Maiandeua Environmental Protection Area =

- Área de Proteção Ambiental de Algodoal-Maiandeua
- IUCN category V (protected landscape/seascape)
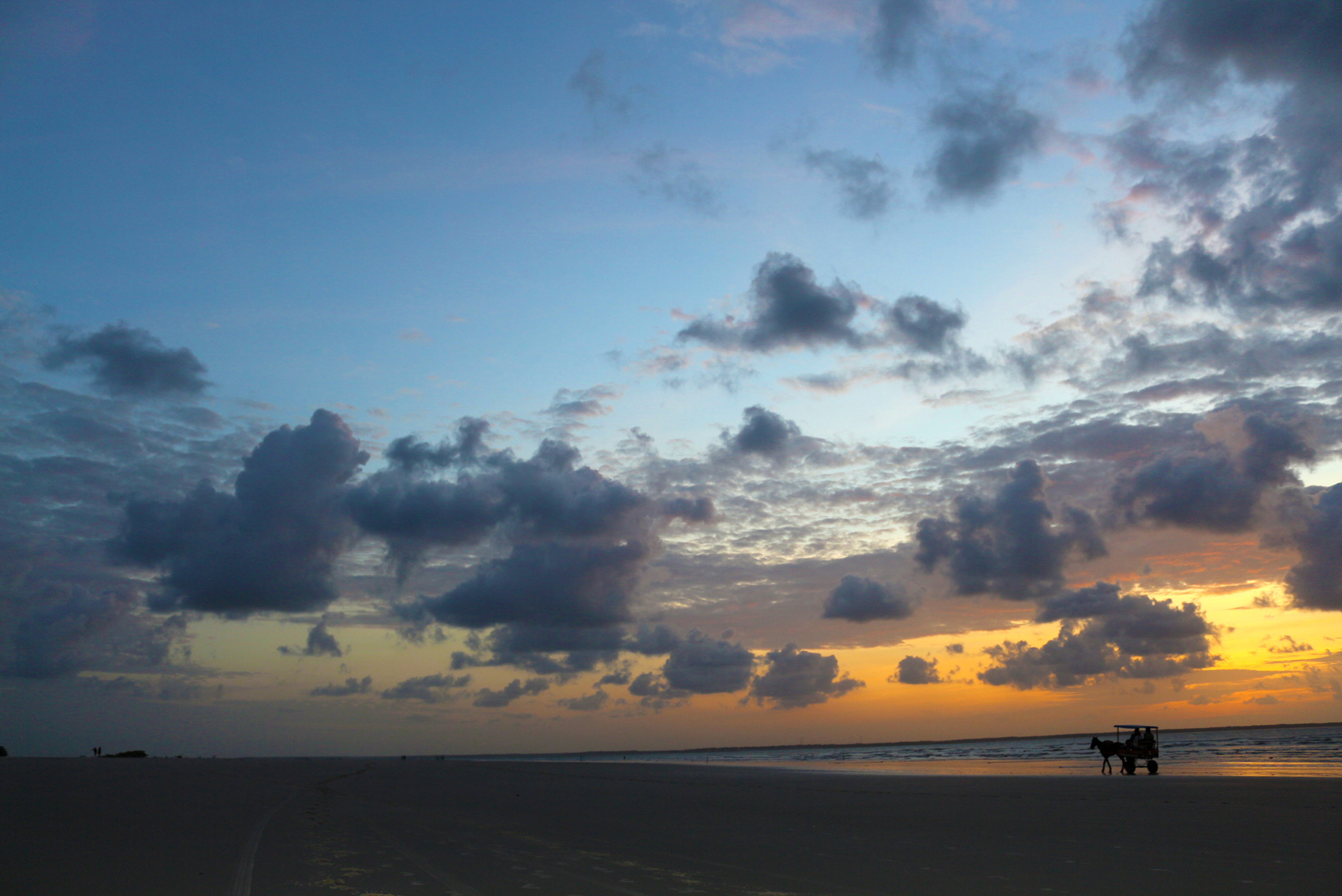
- Maiandeua island

- Location within Brazil
- Nearest city: Maracanã, Pará
- Coordinates: 0°36′49″S 47°33′45″W
- Area: 3,100 ha (12 sq mi)
- Designation: Environmental protection area
- Created: 27 November 1990
- Administrator: Instituto de Desenvolvimento Florestal e da Biodiversidade do Estado do Pará

The Algodoal-Maiandeua Environmental Protection Area (Portuguese: Área de Proteção Ambiental de Algodoal-Maiandeua) is an environmental protection area in the state of Pará, Brazil. It protects two coastal islands with beaches, dunes, mangroves and wetlands that are home to fishing people and are popular with tourists.

== Location ==
Conservation units northeast of Belém: 11. Algodoal-Maiandeua APA

The Algodoal-Maiandeua Environmental Protection Area is in the municipality of Maracanã, Pará. It is on the northeast coast of Pará in the Salgado microregion. The Atlantic Ocean is to the north and the Mocooca channel to the south. The Maracanã River estuary is to the east and the Marapanim River estuary to the west. The APA is bounded to the south by the Maracanã Marine Extractive Reserve. The Mestre Lucindo Marine Extractive Reserve is opposite the APA to the west.

The APA has an area of about 3,100.34 hectares (7,661.1 acres) and consists of two islands separated by an intermittent tidal channel called the Furo Velho. Algodoal Island has 605.52 hectares (1,496.3 acres) and contains Algodoal village, Princesa Beach, Farol Beach and areas of mangroves, restingas and dunes. The island and the largest village are named "Algodoal" after a native plant, the algodão de seda. (Note: Others say the island was named Algodoal (algodão means "cotton") by the Portuguese navigators because the white dunes looked like cotton plants, or perhaps because the breaking surf looked like cotton.) Maiandeua island has 2,494.82 hectares (6,164.8 acres) and holds the villages of Fortalezinha, Mocooca and Camboinha, the localities of Camaleão, Passagem and Pedra Chorona, and beaches, mangroves and terra firme areas with vegetation. The villages are separated by areas of mangroves and tidal channels.

The village of Algodoal can be reached by boat from the port of Marudá, a journey of about 40 minutes depending on the tide. A boat from the municipality of Maracanã can cross the Mocooca channel to the village of Mocooca in 5 minutes.

== History ==
Fishermen from whom the present inhabitants are descended seem to have first moved to the island of Algodoal in the 1920s. The Algodoal-Maiandeua Environmental Protection Area was created by law 5.621 of 27 November 1990, covering the islands of Algodoal with 385 hectares (950 acres) and Maiandeua with 1,993 hectares (4,920 acres), making a total of 2,378 hectares (5,880 acres).

The management council was created by decree 291 of 6 June 2006. On 1 June 2007 regulations were passed that prohibited use of motor vehicles in the APA. Preparation of a management plan was approved on 21 September 2011. The management plan was published on 31 December 2012, although it was not made official through an ordinance.

== Environment ==
The APA is in the Amazon biome. The climate is hot and humid, with average annual temperature of 27 °C (81 °F), and average monthly temperatures ranging from 25 to 31 °C (77 to 88 °F). There is most rain from January to March, and a dry season from September to December. The island has beaches, mangroves, freshwater lakes, dunes and streams. Vegetation is typical of restinga, with great variety of species. The mangroves act as nurseries for fish, mussels, shrimps, oysters, turtles, crabs and other marine species. In the dunes and surroundings there are typical fruits such as ajuru, cashew, coconut, murucí, carambola and mango.

Common bird species include the scarlet ibis, herons (such as the black-crowned night heron and yellow-crowned night heron), pavão, rufous crab hawk, yellow-headed caracara, cebinho do mangue, roseate spoonbill, garganey, parrots, collared plover, sanderling, Hudsonian whimbrel and ruddy turnstone. Common fish include pescada amarela, xaréu, mullets, anchovies, corvina, gó (Cynoscion microlepidotus), sharks, Atlantic goliath grouper, Aspistor luniscutis, dourada, white mullet, serra, and robalo. Molluscs and crustaceans include oysters, mussels, turu, sururu, shrimp, and crabs. Other fauna include sloths, coatis, anteaters, foxes, margays, chameleons, white-eared opossums, various species of monkey, raccoons, alligators, red-footed tortoises, and other turtles.

== Tourism ==
The island receives large numbers of tourists, including Brazilian and foreign visitors, who stay in inns and hotels. The residents organize tours and fishing trips. The APA has high tourism potential due to its scenic beauty and variety of ecosystems, beaches, dunes, cliffs, mangroves and trails linking the villages. They villagers sell local handicrafts produced from the regional flora, and practice traditional ways of making cassava flour, music, the carimbó praiano dance, local cooking and artisanal fishing.

== Sources ==
- APA Algodoal-Maiandeua (in Portuguese), ISA: Instituto Socioambiental
- APA de Algodoal Maiandeua (in Portuguese), Via Rural, archived from the original on 2017-02-12
- Área de Proteção Ambiental de Algodoal-Maiandeua (in Portuguese), Ideflor-bio: Instituto de Desenvolvimento Florestal e da Biodiversidade do Estado do Pará
