= Carlinhos Maracanã =

Brazilian footballer (1957–2023)

Personal information
- Full name: Carlos Jorge Ferreira
- Date of birth: 8 September 1957
- Place of birth: Maracanã, Pará, Brazil
- Date of death: 16 October 2023 (aged 66)
- Place of death: Benevides, Pará, Brazil
- Position: Midfielder

Senior career*
Years	Team	Apps	(Gls)
1976–1981	Paysandu		
1982–1983	São Paulo	22	(1)
1983	Taquaritinga		
1984	Coritiba		
1984	Criciúma		
1985	Taquaritinga		
1985	EC São Bernardo		
1987	Rio Negro-AM		
1987	Independente-PA		
- * Club domestic league appearances and goals

Carlos Jorge Ferreira (8 September 1957 – 16 October 2023), better known as Carlinhos Maracanã, was a Brazilian professional footballer who played as a midfielder.

== Career ==
Born in the city of Maracanã, Pará, his nickname carried the name of his hometown. He was champion of Pará three times with Paysandu, and played for São Paulo FC in 1982 and 1983. He ended his career in 1987, being champion of Amazonas with Rio Negro, and playing some matches for Independente.

== Death ==
Carlinhos died from pancreatic cancer in Benevides, on 16 October 2023, at the age of 66.

== Honours ==
Paysandu

- Campeonato Paraense: 1976, 1980, 1981

Rio Negro

- Campeonato Amazonense: 1987
