= Curuçá =

- Municipality
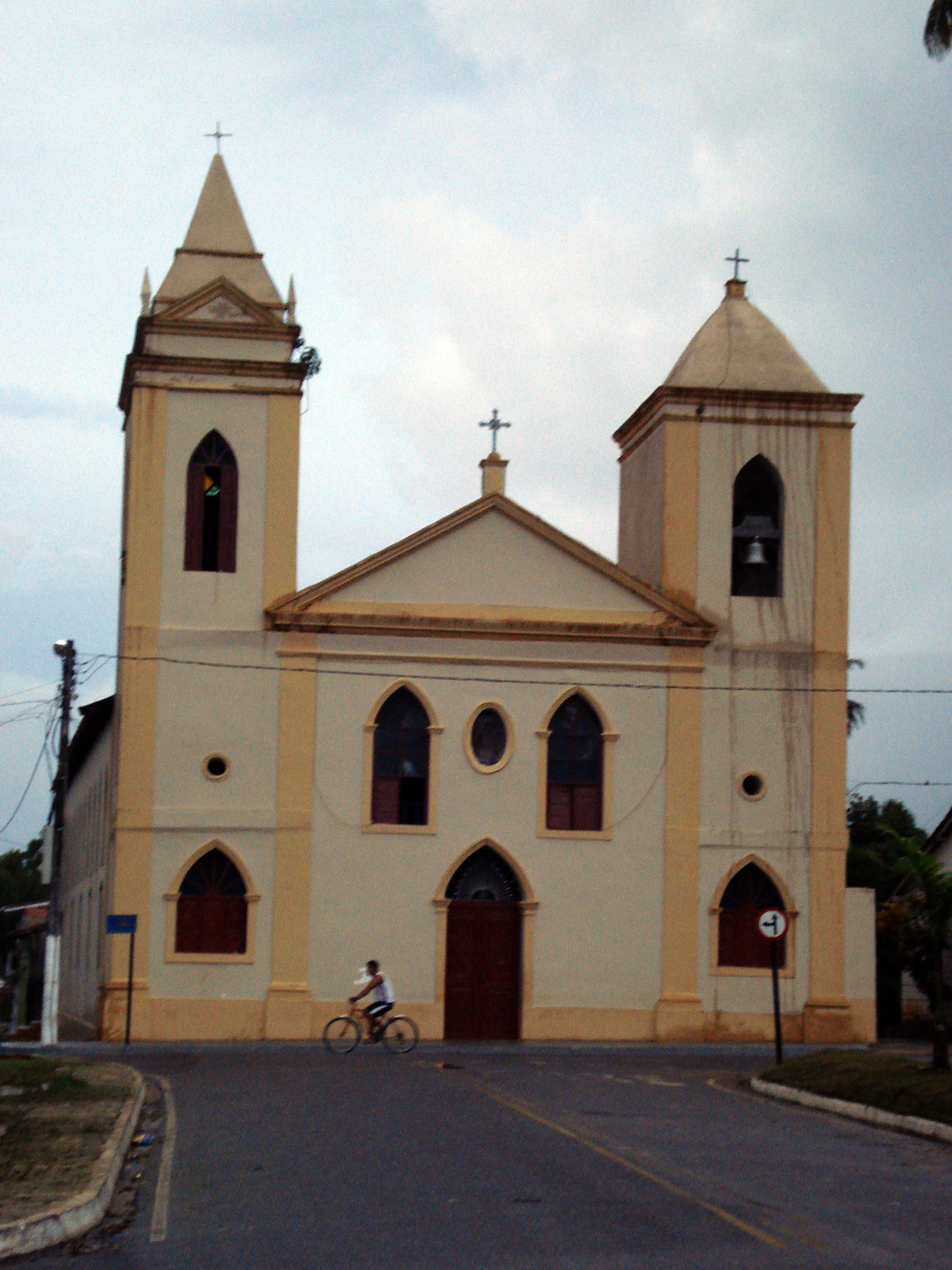

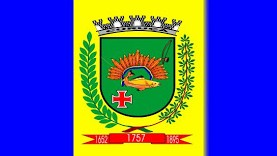
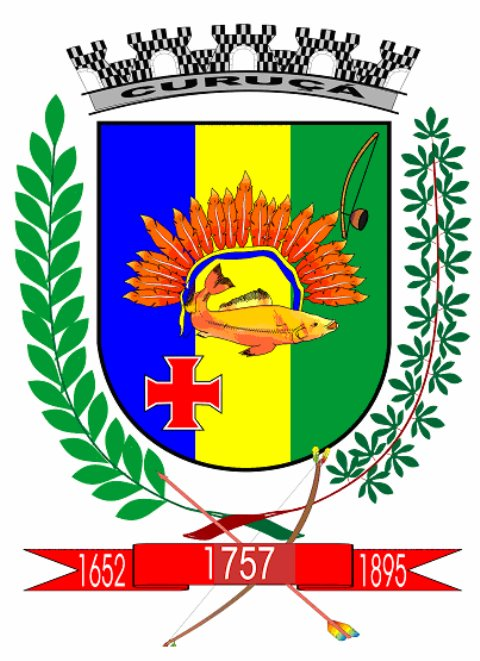
- Flag Coat of arms

- Location in Brazil Curuçá (Brazil)
- Coordinates: .733889°S 47.855°W
- Country: Brazil
- Region: Northern
- State: Pará
- Mesoregion: Nordeste Paraense
- Established: 4 october 1757

Area
  - Total: 25,970 sq mi (67,261 km^{2})
- Elevation: 121 ft (37 m)

Population (2020)
  - Total: 40,584
- Time zone: UTC−3 (BRT)
- Website: [ Official website of Curuaça

Curuçá is a municipality in the state of Pará in the Northern region of Brazil.

Curuçá was founded in 1775, but only became a city in 1895. Some of the municipality was split off into separate municipalities in 1939, 1955 and 1991. The Curuçá River flows from south to north through the municipality, emptying into the Atlantic Ocean. The municipality contains the 37,062-hectare (91,580-acre) Mãe Grande de Curuçá Extractive Reserve, created in 2002, which protects the waters and banks of the estuary.

== See also ==
- List of municipalities in Pará
