= Tracuateua River =

- Location within Brazil
- Native name: Rio Tracuateua (Portuguese)

Location
- Country: Brazil

Physical characteristics
- Mouth
  - location: Quatipuru Bay
  - coordinates: 0.864507°S 46.947093°W

Tracuateua River (Portuguese: Rio Tracuateua) is a short river in the state of Pará, Brazil. It is protected for most of its length by the 27,864 hectares (68,850 acres) Tracuateua Marine Extractive Reserve created in 2005.

== See also ==
- List of rivers of Pará
