= Caeté River (Pará) =

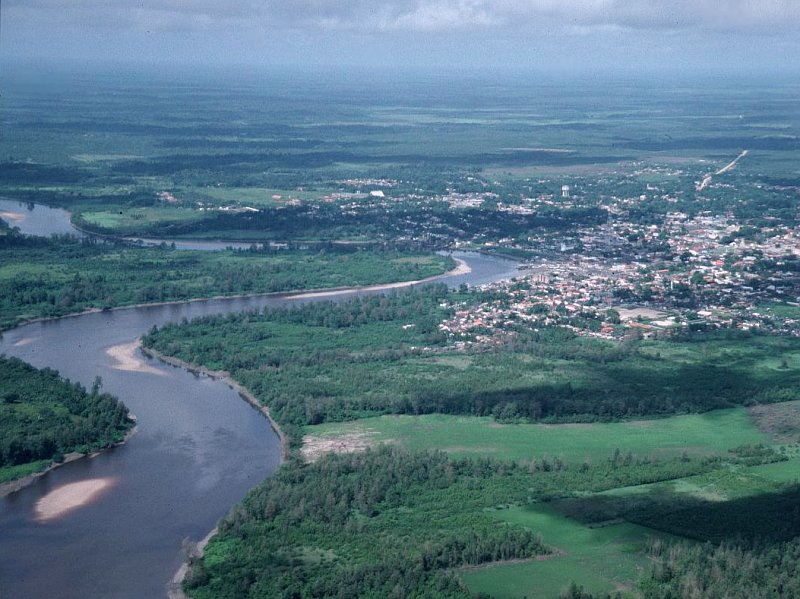

- Location within Brazil
- Native name: Rio Caeté (Portuguese)

Location
- Country: Brazil

Physical characteristics
- Source
  - location: Pará state
- Mouth
  - location: Caeté Bay, Atlantic Ocean
  - coordinates: 0.939200°S 46.608677°W
- Length: 111 km (69 mi)

Caeté River (Portuguese: Rio Caeté) is a river of Pará state in Brazil.

== Course ==
The Caeté River runs north past the town of Bragança, Pará. North of the town the shores are protected by the 42,069 hectares (103,950 acres) Caeté-Taperaçu Marine Extractive Reserve, created in 2005.

== See also ==
- List of rivers of Pará

== Sources ==
- A. Gorayeb: Análise integrada da paisagem na bacia hidrográfica do Rio Caeté – Amazônia oriental – Brasil. Doktorarbeit, Universidade Estadual Paulista (UNESP), Instituto de Geociências e Ciências Exatas, Campus de Rio Claro, Rio Claro-São Paulo. 2008. 206 S. (in Portuguese)
