= Marapanim River =

- Location within Brazil
- Native name: Rio Marapanim (Portuguese)

Location
- Country: Brazil

Physical characteristics
- Source
  - location: São Francisco do Pará
  - coordinates: 1.298547°S 47.729473°W
- Mouth
  - coordinates: 0.700961°S 47.487608°W

Basin features
- Tributaries
  - right: Cuinarana River

The Marapanim River (Portuguese: Rio Marapanim) is a river of the state of Pará, Brazil.

== Course ==
The Marapanim River rises in the municipality of São Francisco do Pará. It flows in a generally north direction, and enters the Atlantic Ocean just past Marapanim, Pará, which lies on its left bank. The eastern side of the Marapanim Bay before Maiandeua Island is protected by the 30,179 hectares (74,570 acres) Maracanã Marine Extractive Reserve, created in 2002. Further south the eastern side is protected by the Cuinarana Marine Extractive Reserve. The western side is protected by the 26,465 hectares (65,400 acres) Mestre Lucindo Marine Extractive Reserve, created in 2014.

== Environment ==
At its mouth the river is mainly bordered by mud flats. The area around Rio Marapanim has a low population, with about 18 people per square kilometre. The area has a monsoon climate. The average temperature is 24 °C (75 °F). The hottest month is September, with 25 °C (77 °F) and the coldest month is January, with 22 °C (72 °F). Average annual rainfall is 3,146 millimetres (123.9 in). The wettest month is March, with 699 millimetres (27.5 in) and the driest month is October, with 12 millimetres (0.47 in).

== See also ==
- List of rivers of Pará

== Sources ==
- Cunha, Raymundo Cyriaco Alves da (1887), Pequena chorographia da provincia do Pará, Typ. do Diario de Belem
- Oliveira, Valéria de Albuquerque; Fontoura, Nelson Ferreira; Montag, Luciano Fogaça de Assis (2011), "Reproductive characteristics and the weight-length relationship in Anablepsanableps (Linnaeus, 1758) (Cyprinodontiformes: Anablepidae) from the Amazon Estuary", Neotropical Ichthyology, 9 (4), Sociedade Brasileira de Ictiologia, doi:10.1590/s1679-62252011005000042, hdl:10923/13412
- RESEX Marinha do Maracanã (in Portuguese), ISA: Instituto Socioambiental
- RESEX Marinha Mestre Lucindo (in Portuguese), ISA: Instituto Socioambiental
