= Gurupi-Piriá Marine Extractive Reserve =

Nature reserve in Pará, Brazil

- Reserva Extrativista Marinha de Gurupi-Piriá
- IUCN category VI (protected area with sustainable use of natural resources)
- Location within Brazil
- Coordinates: 1.003363°S 46.223133°W
- Area: 74,081 hectares (183,060 acres)
- Designation: Extractive reserve
- Created: 20 May 2005
- Administrator: Chico Mendes Institute for Biodiversity Conservation

The Gurupi-Piriá Marine Extractive Reserve (Portuguese: Reserva Extrativista Marinha de Gurupi-Piriá) is a coastal marine extractive reserve in the state of Pará, Brazil.

== Location ==
Conservation units northeast of Belém: 17. Gurupi-Piriá Marine Extractive Reserve

The Gurupi-Piriá Marine Extractive Reserve is in the municipality of Viseu on the Atlantic coast of the extreme east of Pará. It has an area of 74,081 hectares (183,060 acres). It adjoins the Araí-Peroba Marine Extractive Reserve to the west and the Reentrâncias Maranhenses Environmental Protection Area in the state of Maranhão to the east.

The reserve is in an area of coastal plains and rivers, with beaches, dunes and cliffs, and includes the islands of Apeú Salvador, Itacupim, Taperebateua and dos Pássaros. The maximum elevation is 15 metres (49 ft) above sea level. The main rivers are the Gurupí along the eastern boundary, the Limondeua, Bombom and Piriá. The reserve protects both sides of the Piriá River, and the coasts and inlets of the peninsulas on both sides of the mouth of this river.

== Environment ==
Average annual rainfall is 2,200 millimetres (87 in) Temperatures range from 22 to 38 °C (72 to 100 °F) with an average of 30 °C (86 °F). Mangroves include Avicennia germinans, Avicennia schaueriana, Laguncularia racemosa and Rhizophora mangle. Riparian forests along the sides of the small streams, and small grassland areas, form the transition from the mangroves to terra firma.

== History ==
The Gurupi-Piriá Marine Extractive Reserve was created by federal decree on 20 May 2005. It is administered by the Chico Mendes Institute for Biodiversity Conservation (ICMBio). It is classed as IUCN protected area category VI (protected area with sustainable use of natural resources). An extractive reserve is an area used by traditional extractive populations whose livelihood is based on extraction, subsistence agriculture and small-scale animal raising. Its basic objectives are to protect the livelihoods and culture of these people and to ensure sustainable use of natural resources.

The Instituto Nacional de Colonização e Reforma Agrária (INCRA: National Institute for Colonization and Agrarian Reform) recognised the reserve on 29 November 2005 as supporting 2,000 families of small rural producers, who would qualify for PRONAF support. The deliberative council was created on 1 February 2008. On 23 March 2010 ICMBio gave the users' association of the reserve the right to use it for twenty years.

== Sources ==
- Resex Gurupi-Piriá (in Portuguese), ICMBio: Chico Mendes Institute for Biodiversity Conservation
- RESEX Marinha de Gurupi-Piriá (in Portuguese), ISA: Instituto Socioambiental
- Unidade de Conservação: Reserva Extrativista Marinha de Gurupi-Piriá (in Portuguese), MMA: Ministério do Meio Ambiente
