= Tracuateua Marine Extractive Reserve =

- Reserva Extrativista Marinha de Tracuateua
- IUCN category VI (protected area with sustainable use of natural resources)
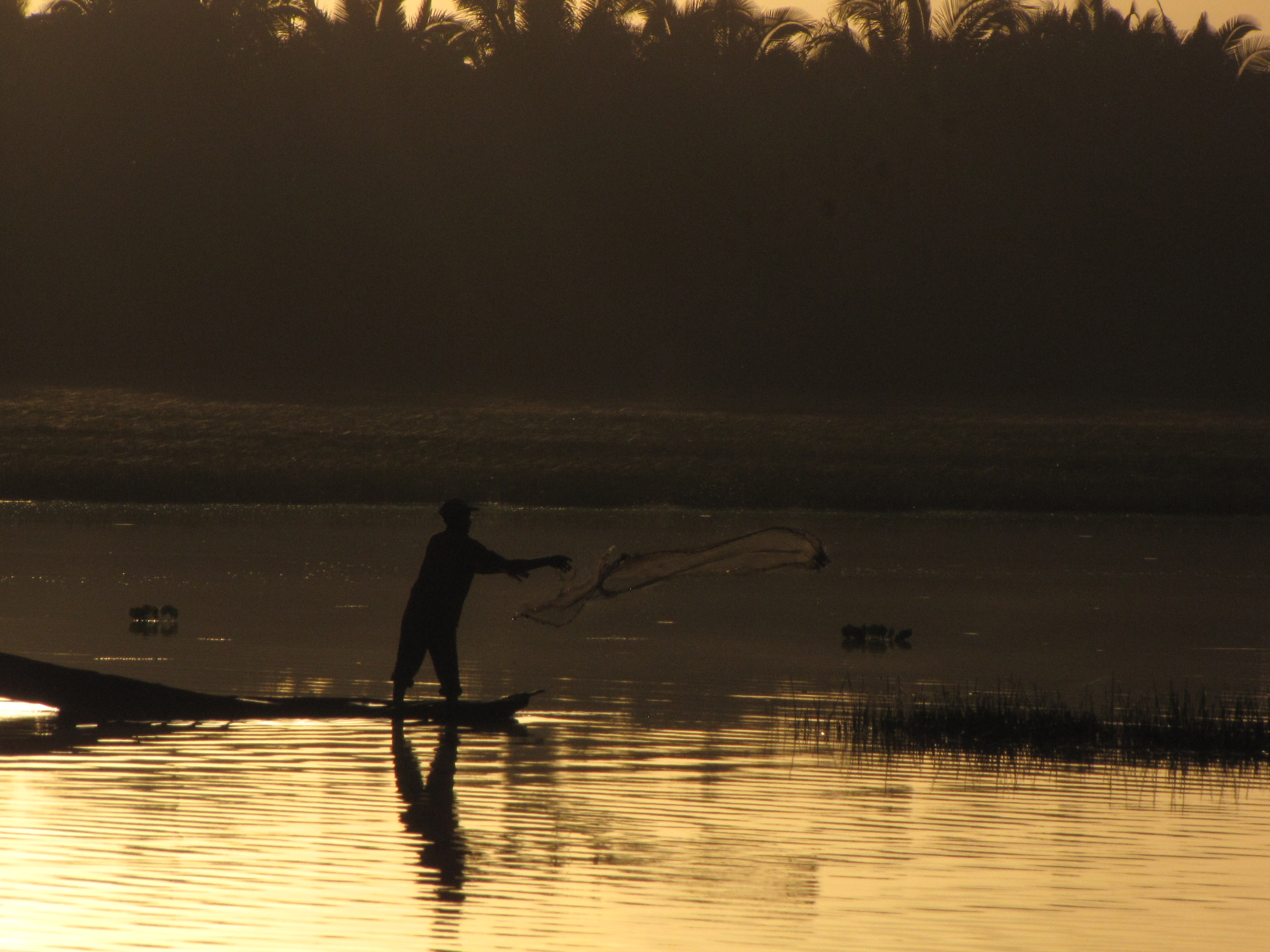

- Location within Brazil
- Nearest city: Bragança, Pará
- Coordinates: 0.836°S 46.893°W
- Area: 27,864 hectares (68,850 acres)
- Designation: Extractive reserve
- Created: 20 May 2005
- Administrator: Chico Mendes Institute for Biodiversity Conservation

Tracuateua Marine Extractive Reserve (Portuguese: Reserva Extrativista Marinha de Tracuateua is a marine extractive reserve in the state of Pará, Brazil. It is used for small-scale farming and fishing, but the main activity is scavenging for crabs, especially the uçá crab . The reserve is suffering from growing human pressure leading to dwindling stocks of resources.

== Location ==
Conservation units northeast of Belém: 14. Tracuateua Marine Extractive Reserve

The Tracuateua Marine Extractive Reserve is in the coastal marine biome and has an area of 27,864 hectares (68,850 acres). It includes the estuary of the Tracuateua River, Quatipuru bay and the coast to the east. 65.71% of the reserve is in the municipality of Tracuateua, Pará, and 0.71% is in the municipality of Bragança, Pará. The reserve adjoins the Caeté-Taperaçu Marine Extractive Reserve to the east. The reserve differs from other coastal marine reserves protecting mangroves in that it includes fields within its area and fish in freshwater ponds. Vegetation is mainly mangrove species of the genera Rhizophora, Avicennia and Laguncularia.

As of 2015 about 30,000 people depended on the reserve for their living. There were about 130 families living within the reserve and 2,200 coming from outside. The user population as of 2016 was about 2,500 families of farmers, either small landowners or leaseholders. The main activity is scavenging for crabs.

== Administration ==
The Tracuateua Marine Extractive Reserve was created by decree on 20 May 2005 and is administered by the Chico Mendes Institute for Biodiversity Conservation. It is classed as IUCN protected area category VI (protected area with sustainable use of natural resources). An extractive reserve is an area used by traditional extractive populations whose livelihood is based on extraction, subsistence agriculture and small-scale animal raising. Its basic objectives are to protect the livelihoods and culture of these people and to ensure sustainable use of natural resources. The deliberative council was created on 20 November 2007. The reserve is open only to visitors with special permission.

The European Union funds the Tracuateua Project, which is coordinated by AUREMAT (User's Association of the Tracuateua Marine Extractive Reserve). The project operates in four marine extractive reserves in the municipalities of Tracuateua, Bragança, Viseu and Augusto Corrêa in the Salgado region of the state of Pará. The purpose is to reduce predatory activities and strengthen sustainable production, marketing and processing of extractive products.

== Issues ==
Issues include a growing population of users and outsiders, leading to reduction of stocks of fish and shellfish, dependence on middlemen for marketing and loose animals in the reserve. Horses were let loose after people began using motorbikes, and horses and buffaloes now invade the fields where the users grow tobacco and cassava, damaging the crops. There are conflicts between the residents and bird hunters. Meros, a type of large grouper, were once common but are now endangered due to over-fishing.

== Sources ==
- João Lara Mesquita (14 December 2015), "Resex Marinha de Tracuateua", Mar Sem Fim (in Portuguese)
- Resex Marinha de Tracuateua (in Portuguese), Chico Mendes Institute for Biodiversity Conservation
- RESEX Marinha de Tracuateua (in Portuguese), ISA: Instituto Socioambiental
- Unidade de Conservação: Reserva Extrativista Marinha Tracuateua (in Portuguese), MMA: Ministério do Meio Ambiente
- Zezinho Aviz (8 November 2013), RESEX Tracuateua Lança Projeto de Cooperação Internacional! (in Portuguese), Tracuateua-PA
