= Caeté-Taperaçu Marine Extractive Reserve =

Protected area in Pará, Brazil

- Reserva Extrativista Marinha de Caeté-Taperaçu
- IUCN category VI (protected area with sustainable use of natural resources)
- Location within Brazil
- Nearest city: Bragança, Pará
- Coordinates: 0.900362°S 46.722265°W
- Area: 42,069 hectares (103,950 acres)
- Designation: Extractive reserve
- Administrator: Chico Mendes Institute for Biodiversity Conservation

The Caeté-Taperaçu Marine Extractive Reserve (Portuguese: Reserva Extrativista Marinha de Caeté-Taperaçu) is a coastal marine extractive reserve in the state of Pará, Brazil.

== Location ==
Conservation units northeast of Belém: 15. Caeté-Taperaçu Marine Extractive Reserve

The Caeté-Taperaçu Marine Extractive Reserve is in the municipality of Bragança, Pará. It has an area of 42,069 hectares (103,950 acres). The reserve protects the coasts and inlets of the two peninsulas on either side of the Baía do Maiaú, and extends up the Caeté River to the town of Bragança. It adjoins the Tracuateua Marine Extractive Reserve to the west and the Araí-Peroba Marine Extractive Reserve to the east.

== Environment ==
The land is very flat, and almost all the reserve is subject to salt water flooding. Average temperature is 26 °C (79 °F). Average annual rainfall is 2,756 millimetres (108.5 in). 24,000 hectares (59,000 acres) of the reserve consists of mangroves, while the remainder consists of estuaries, beaches, islands, dunes, saline grasslands and other coastal environments. The reserve has large tracts of well-preserved mangroves. There are many coastal, marine and shore birds and many small and medium-sized mammals and reptiles.

== Economy ==
There are three communities within the reserve, occupying an area of about 80 hectares (200 acres) with about 700 families. About 5,000 families use the natural resources of the mangroves, including crabs, various species of sea fish, estuarine shrimp, clams, fruit and other mangrove products. The Jabuti archaeological site has Terra preta soil from pre-historic farming, and ceramic remains with an estimated age of 2,300 years.

== History ==
The Caeté-Taperaçu Marine Extractive Reserve was created by federal decree on 20 May 2005 to protect livelihoods and ensure the use and conservation of renewable natural resources traditionally used by the resident population. It is administered by the Chico Mendes Institute for Biodiversity Conservation (ICMBio). It is classed as IUCN protected area category VI (protected area with sustainable use of natural resources). An extractive reserve is an area used by traditional extractive populations whose livelihood is based on extraction, subsistence agriculture and small-scale animal raising. Its basic objectives are to protect the livelihoods and culture of these people and to ensure sustainable use of natural resources.

The reserve was recognised by the Instituto Nacional de Colonização e Reforma Agrária (INCRA: National Institute for Colonization and Agrarian Reform) on 29 November 2005 as meeting the needs of 3,000 families of small rural producers, who would qualify for PRONAF. This was adjusted to 5,000 families on 5 January 2009. The deliberative council was created on 24 September 2007. On 28 September 2011 ICMBio assigned the right of use for fifty years to the users' association of the reserve. The management plan was approved on 13 December 2013.

== Sources ==
- Resex Marinha de Caeté-Taperaçu (in Portuguese), ICMBio: Chico Mendes Institute for Biodiversity Conservation
- RESEX Marinha de Caeté-Taperaçu (in Portuguese), ISA: Instituto Socioambiental
- Unidade de Conservação: Reserva Extrativista Marinha CaetéTaperaçu (in Portuguese), MMA: Ministério do Meio Ambiente
