= Marapanim =

Coordinates: 0°42′S 47°42′W

- Municipality
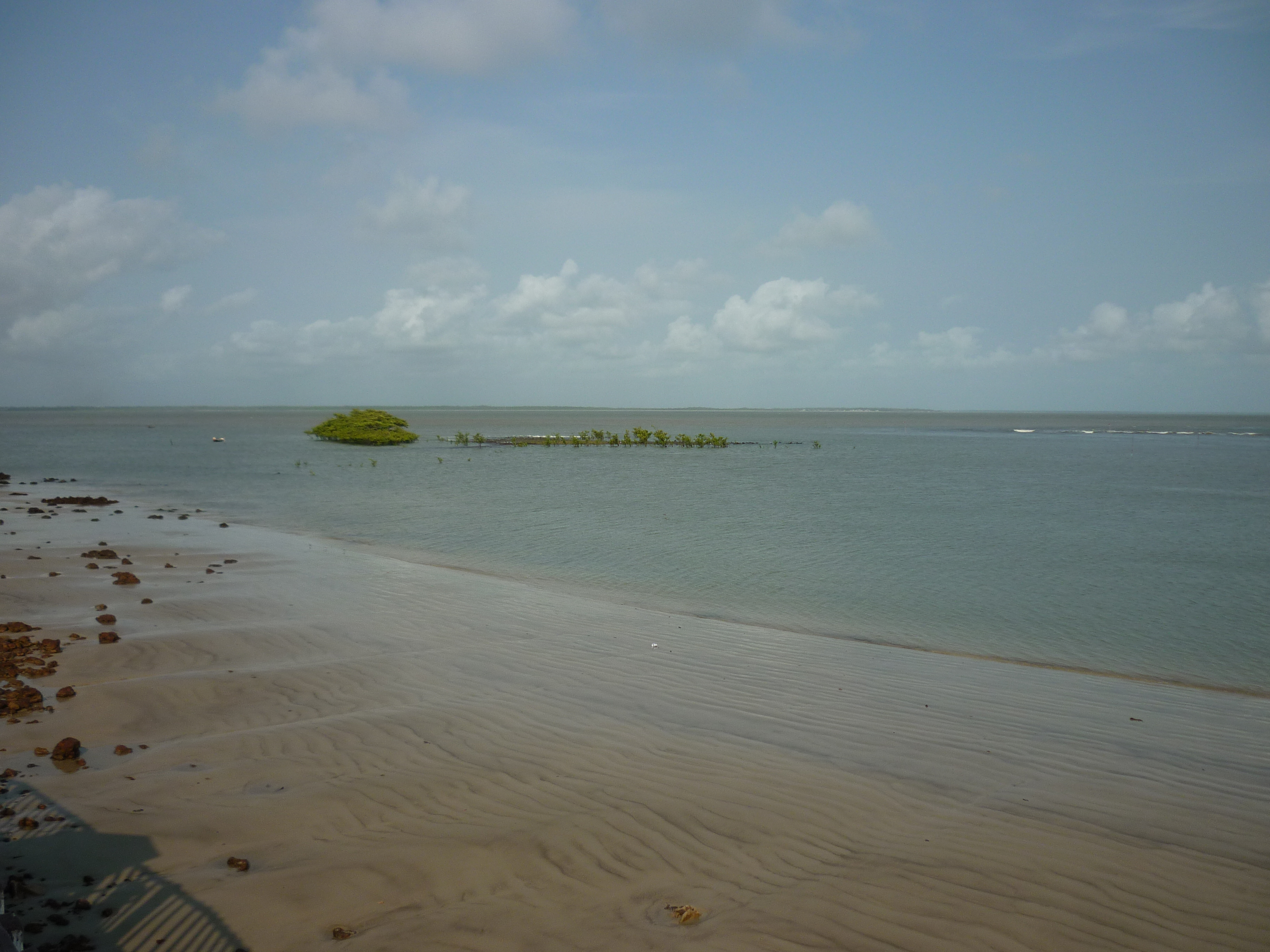
- Beach of Marapanim

- Location in Pará
- Country: Brazil
- Region: Northern
- State: Pará
- Mesoregion: Nordeste Paraense

Population (2020)
  - Total: 28,450
- Time zone: UTC−3 (BRT)

Marapanim is a municipality in the state of Pará in the Northern region of Brazil.

The municipality is on the left (west) bank of the Marapanim River. It contains the 26,465-hectare (65,400-acre) Mestre Lucindo Marine Extractive Reserve, created in 2014.

== See also ==
- List of municipalities in Pará
