= São Francisco do Pará =

Coordinates: 1.16889°S 47.795°W

- Municipality
- Interactive map of São Francisco do Pará
- Country: Brazil
- Region: Northern
- State: Pará
- Mesoregion: Nordeste Paraense

Population (2020)
  - Total: 15,930
- Time zone: UTC−3 (BRT)

São Francisco do Pará is a municipality in the state of Pará in the Northern region of Brazil.

== See also ==
- List of municipalities in Pará
