= Bragança, Pará =

Bragança
- Municipality
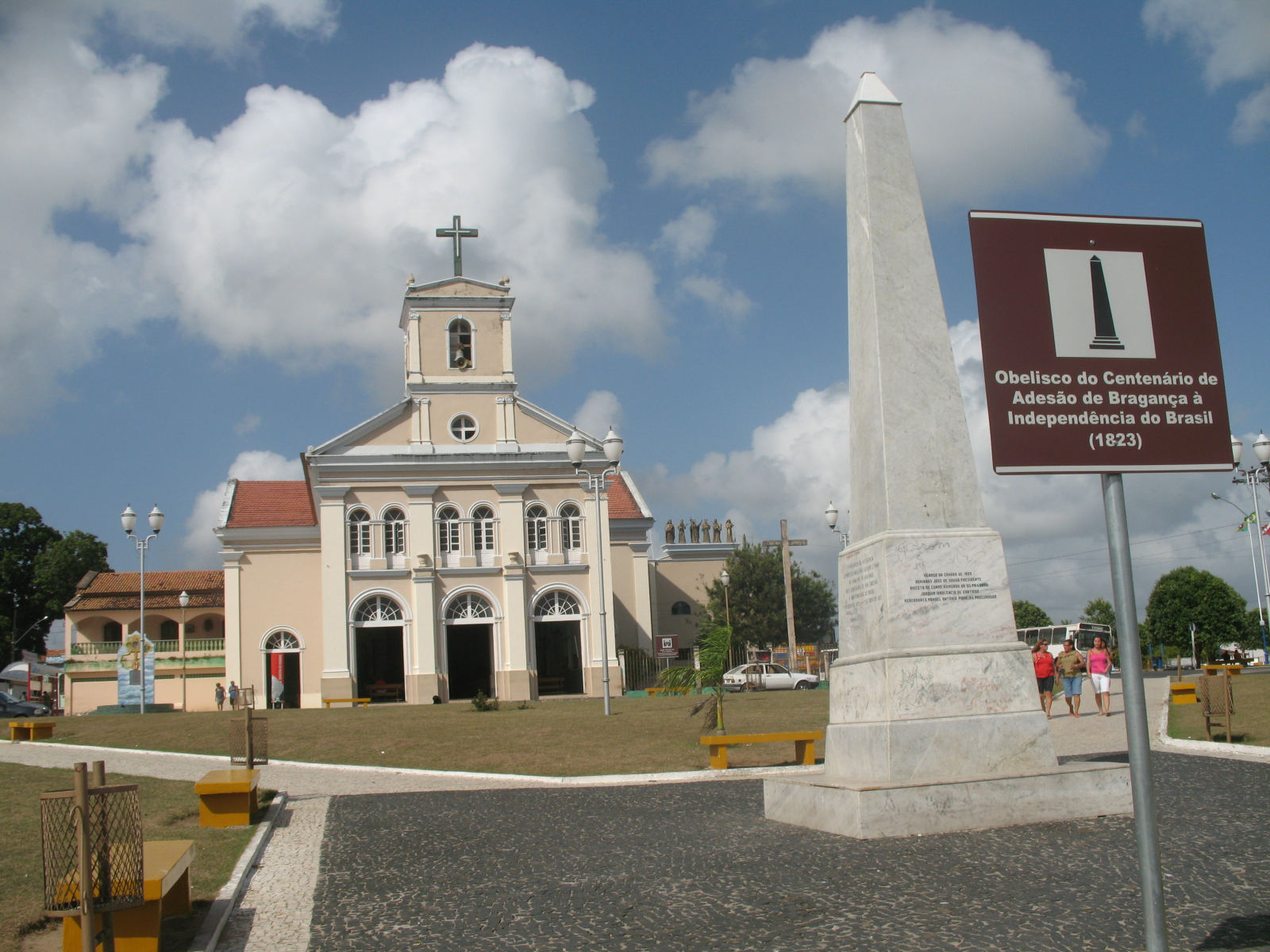
- Bragança (Sao Pedro Alcantara) Cathedral and Obelisk

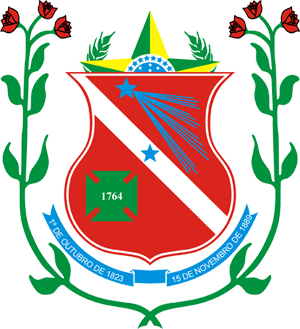
- Flag Coat of arms
- Nickname: Tera da Marujada (Land of the Fandango)
- Location of Bragança in the State of Pará

- Location in Brazil
- Coordinates: 01°03′46″S 46°46′22″W
- Country: Brazil
- Region: Northern
- State: Pará
- Mesoregion: Nordeste Paraense
- Demonym: bragantino(a)
- Founded: 1613

Government
  - Mayor: Joao Nelson Pereira Magalhaes (PT)

Area
  - Total: 810.098 sq mi (2,098.144 km^{2})
- Elevation: 62 ft (19 m)

Population (2022 Census)
  - Total: 123,082
  - Estimate (2025): 132,489
  - Density: 151.935/sq mi (58.6623/km^{2})
- Time zone: UTC−3 (BRT)

Bragança is a municipality in the state of Pará in the Northern region of Brazil.

The municipality contains part of the 27,864 hectares (68,850 acres) of the Tracuateua Marine Extractive Reserve, an extractive reserve unit created in 2005. It contains the 42,069 hectares (103,950 acres) Caeté-Taperaçu Marine Extractive Reserve, created in 2005.

== History ==
The city was founded as New Bragança (after Bragança, Portugal).

== See also ==
- List of municipalities in Pará
