= Cuinarana Marine Extractive Reserve =

Extractive reserve in Pará, Brazil

- Reserva Extrativista Marinha Cuinarana
- IUCN category VI (protected area with sustainable use of natural resources)
- Location within Brazil
- Nearest city: Magalhães Barata, Pará
- Coordinates: 0.786230°S 47.700929°W
- Area: 11,037 hectares (27,270 acres)
- Designation: Extractive reserve
- Created: 10 October 2014
- Administrator: Chico Mendes Institute for Biodiversity Conservation

The Cuinarana Marine Extractive Reserve (Portuguese: Reserva Extrativista Marinha Cuinarana) is a coastal marine extractive reserve in the state of Pará, Brazil.

== Location ==
Conservation units northeast of Belém: 10. Cuinarana Marine Extractive Reserve

The Cuinarana Marine Extractive Reserve is in the municipality of Magalhães Barata, Pará. It has an area of 11,037 hectares (27,270 acres). The reserve protects the mangroves between the east bank of the Marapanim River and the west bank of the Cuinarana River. The Mestre Lucindo Marine Extractive Reserve lies to the west and the Maracanã Marine Extractive Reserve lies to the east.

== History ==
The Cuinarana Marine Extractive Reserve was created by federal decree on 10 October 2014. The reserve is one of three created by president Dilma Rousseff thirteen days before the 2014 presidential elections. The other two are the Mocapajuba and Mestre Lucindo marine extractive reserves, both also in Pará. The Araí-Peroba Marine Extractive Reserve was expanded by 50,500 hectares (125,000 acres).

The reserve is administered by the Chico Mendes Institute for Biodiversity Conservation (ICMBio). It is classed as IUCN protected area category VI (protected area with sustainable use of natural resources). The objective is to conserve the biodiversity of the ecosystems of mangroves, salt marshes, dunes, wetlands, floodplains, rivers, estuaries and islands; and to protect the livelihoods and culture of the traditional extractive population, and ensure the sustainable use of natural resources of the unit.

== Sources ==
- Daniele Bragança (13 October 2014), "Em plena campanha, Dilma cria novas UCs na Amazônia", O Eco
- Resex Marinha Cuinarana (in Portuguese), ICMBio: Chico Mendes Institute for Biodiversity Conservation
- RESEX Marinha Cuinarana (in Portuguese), ISA: Instituto Socioambiental
- Unidade de Conservação: Reserva Extrativista Marinha Cuinarana (in Portuguese), MMA: Ministério do Meio Ambiente
