= Caripi River (Maracanã) =

- Location within Brazil
- Native name: Rio Caripi (Portuguese)

Location
- Country: Brazil

Physical characteristics
- Source
  - location: State of Pará, Brazil
- Mouth
  - coordinates: 0.759265°S 47.485769°W

Basin features
- River system: Maracanã River

The Caripi River (Portuguese: Rio Caripi) is a river of the state of Pará, Brazil. It is a left tributary of the Maracanã River.

== Course ==
The Caripi River is the main tributary of the Maracanã River, which it enters from the left. The lower reaches of the river are protected by the 30,179 hectares (74,570 acres) Maracanã Marine Extractive Reserve, created in 2002.

== Environment ==
The river is mainly surrounded by forest. The region has a relatively low population, with 43 people per square kilometer. The average temperature is 24 °C (75 °F). The hottest month is November, with 24 °C (75 °F) and the coldest month is March, with 22 °C (72 °F). Average annual rainfall is 2,830 millimetres (111 in). The wettest month is March, with 655 millimetres (25.8 in) and the driest month is October with 9 millimetres (0.35 in).

Rio Caripi

Climate chart (precipitation, max. and min. temperature)
J	F	M	A	M	J	J	A	S	O	N	D
223 24 22	450 25 22	655 24 21	526 23 21	387 24 21	185 25 21	201 26 22	80 26 22	33 27 22	9 27 22	22 27 22	58 26 22
- █ Average max. and min. temperatures in °C
- █ Precipitation totals in mm
Imperial conversion
J	F	M	A	M	J	J	A	S	O	N	D
8.8 75 72	18 77 72	26 75 70	21 73 70	15 75 70	7.3 77 70	7.9 79 72	3.1 79 72	1.3 81 72	0.4 81 72	0.9 81 72	2.3 79 72
- █ Average max. and min. temperatures in °F
- █ Precipitation totals in inches

== See also ==
- List of rivers of Pará

== Sources ==
- Oliveira, Valéria de Albuquerque; Fontoura, Nelson Ferreira; Montag, Luciano Fogaça de Assis (2011), "Reproductive characteristics and the weight-length relationship in Anablepsanableps (Linnaeus, 1758) (Cyprinodontiformes: Anablepidae) from the Amazon Estuary", Neotropical Ichthyology, 9 (4), Sociedade Brasileira de Ictiologia, doi:10.1590/s1679-62252011005000042, hdl:10923/13412
- RESEX Marinha do Maracanã (in Portuguese), ISA: Instituto Socioambiental
