= Maracanã River (Pará) =

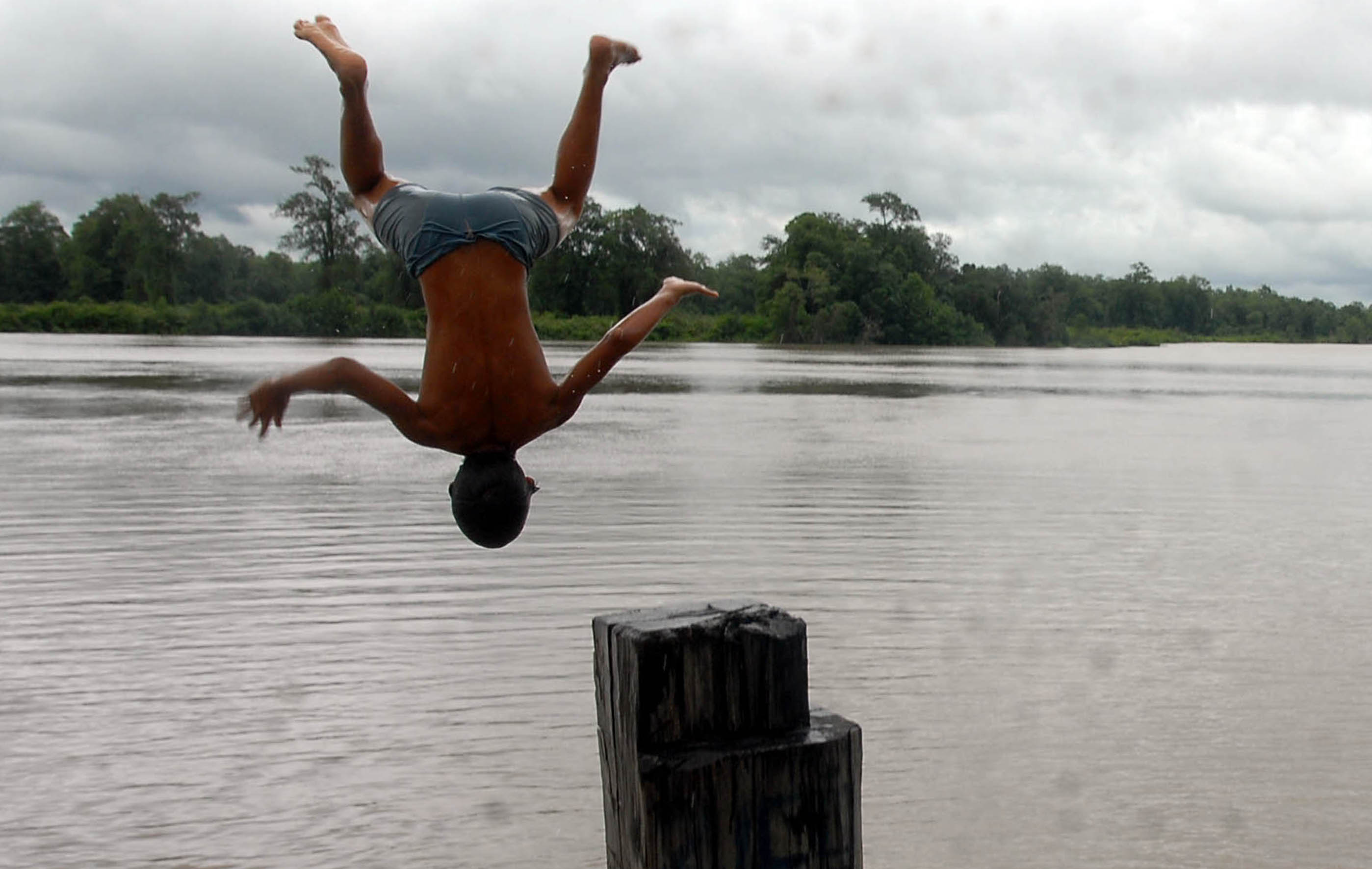
- Boy jumping in Maracanã River, Santarém Novo

- Location within Brazil
- Native name: Rio Maracanã (Portuguese)

Location
- Country: Brazil

Physical characteristics
- Source
  - location: Castanhal, Pará
  - coordinates: 1.477428°S 47.692530°W
- Mouth
  - coordinates: 0.700961°S 47.487608°W

Basin features
- Tributaries
  - left: Caripi River

The Maracanã River (Portuguese: Rio Maracanã) is a river of the state of Pará, Brazil.

== Course ==
The Maracanã is a meandering river with a main channel that varies in depth in its lower reaches from 15 to 20 metres (49 to 66 ft). It rises in the south of the municipality of Castanhal, Pará, then flows in a northeast direction to the Atlantic Ocean at Maracanã, Pará. The river is lowest between September and October and highest between February and April. Its main tributary is the Caripi River, which enters the Maracanã from the left.

Santarém Novo is on the right bank of the river about 35 kilometres (22 mi) from its mouth on the Atlantic. The Chocoaré - Mato Grosso Extractive Reserve protects part of the right (east) shore of the Maracanã River. The lower reaches of the Maracanã River, before it empties into the Atlantic Ocean beside Maiandeua Island, are protected by the 30,179 hectares (74,570 acres) Maracanã Marine Extractive Reserve, created in 2002. The municipality and town of Maracanã are at the mouth of the river.

== Environment ==
The vegetation around the Maracanã River is mostly savanna. The area around the river has a relatively small population, with 38 people per square kilometre. Temperatures average 24 °C (75 °F). The hottest month is July, with 26 °C (79 °F), and the coldest month is April, with 22 °C (72 °F). Annual rainfall averages 3,226 millimetres (127.0 in). The wettest month is March, with 574 millimetres (22.6 in) and the driest is October, with 43 millimetres (1.7 in).

Rio Maracanã

Climate chart (precipitation, max. and min. temperature)
| J | F | M | A | M | J | J | A | S | O | N | D |
| 305 25 21 | 461 26 21 | 574 25 21 | 522 24 19 | 369 25 21 | 220 24 20 | 250 26 20 | 170 27 21 | 105 27 21 | 43 30 21 | 70 29 21 | 137 29 21 |
- █ Average max. and min. temperatures in °C
- █ Precipitation totals in mm
Imperial conversion
| J | F | M | A | M | J | J | A | S | O | N | D |
| 12 77 70 | 18 79 70 | 23 77 70 | 21 75 66 | 15 77 70 | 8.7 75 68 | 9.8 79 68 | 6.7 81 70 | 4.1 81 70 | 1.7 86 70 | 2.8 84 70 | 5.4 84 70 |
- █ Average max. and min. temperatures in °F
- █ Precipitation totals in inches

== See also ==
- List of rivers of Pará

== Sources ==
- Cunha, Raymundo Cyriaco Alves da (1887), Pequena chorographia da provincia do Pará, Typ. do Diario de Belem
- Oliveira, Valéria de Albuquerque; Fontoura, Nelson Ferreira; Montag, Luciano Fogaça de Assis (2011), "Reproductive characteristics and the weight-length relationship in Anablepsanableps (Linnaeus, 1758) (Cyprinodontiformes: Anablepidae) from the Amazon Estuary", Neotropical Ichthyology, 9 (4), Sociedade Brasileira de Ictiologia, doi:10.1590/s1679-62252011005000042, hdl:10923/13412
- RESEX Chocoaré - Mato Grosso (in Portuguese), ISA: Instituto Socioambiental
- RESEX Marinha do Maracanã (in Portuguese), ISA: Instituto Socioambiental
