= Maracanã, Pará =

Coordinates: 0°45′54″S 47°27′00″W

- Municipality
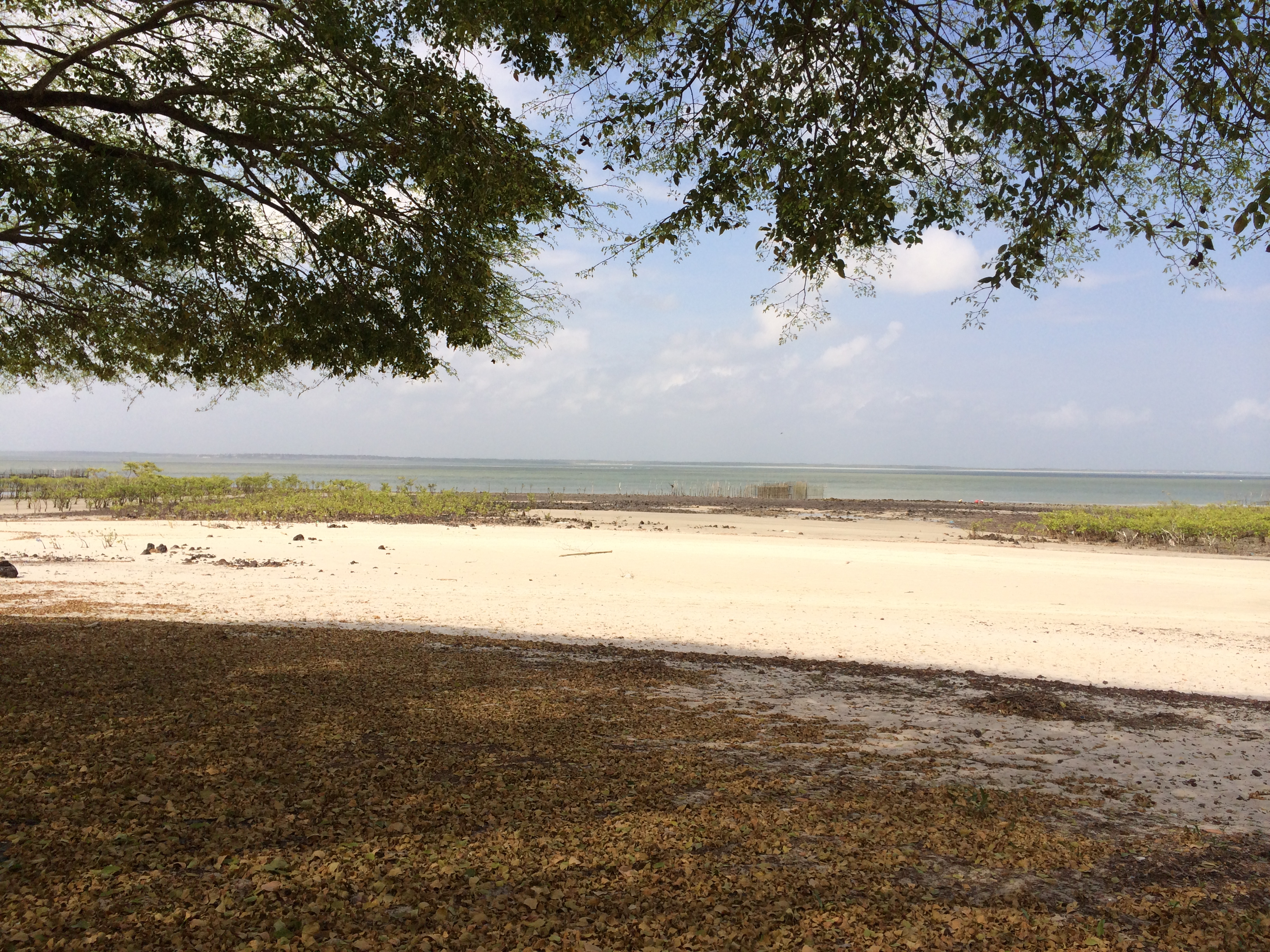

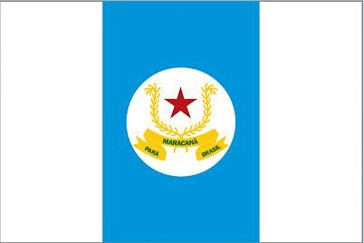
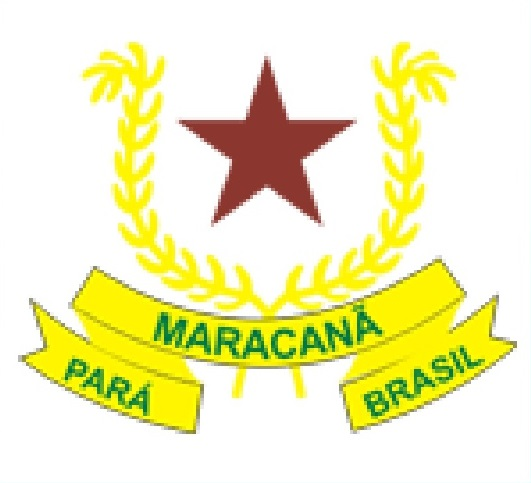
- Flag Coat of arms

- Location in Pará
- Country: Brazil
- Region: Northern
- State: Pará
- Mesoregion: Nordeste Paraense

Population (2020)
  - Total: 29,516
- Time zone: UTC−3 (BRT)

Maracanã, Pará is a municipality in the state of Pará in the Northern region of Brazil.

The municipality contains the lower reaches of the Maracanã River, which is joined by the Caripi River before widening into Maracanã Bay and emptying into the Atlantic Ocean beside Maiandeua Island. The banks of the rivers are protected by the 30,179-hectare (74,570-acre) Maracanã Marine Extractive Reserve, created in 2002. The municipality contains the 2,378-hectare (5,880-acre) Algodoal-Maiandeua Environmental Protection Area, created in 1990.

== See also ==
- List of municipalities in Pará
