= Curuçá River (Pará) =

River in Pará, Brazil

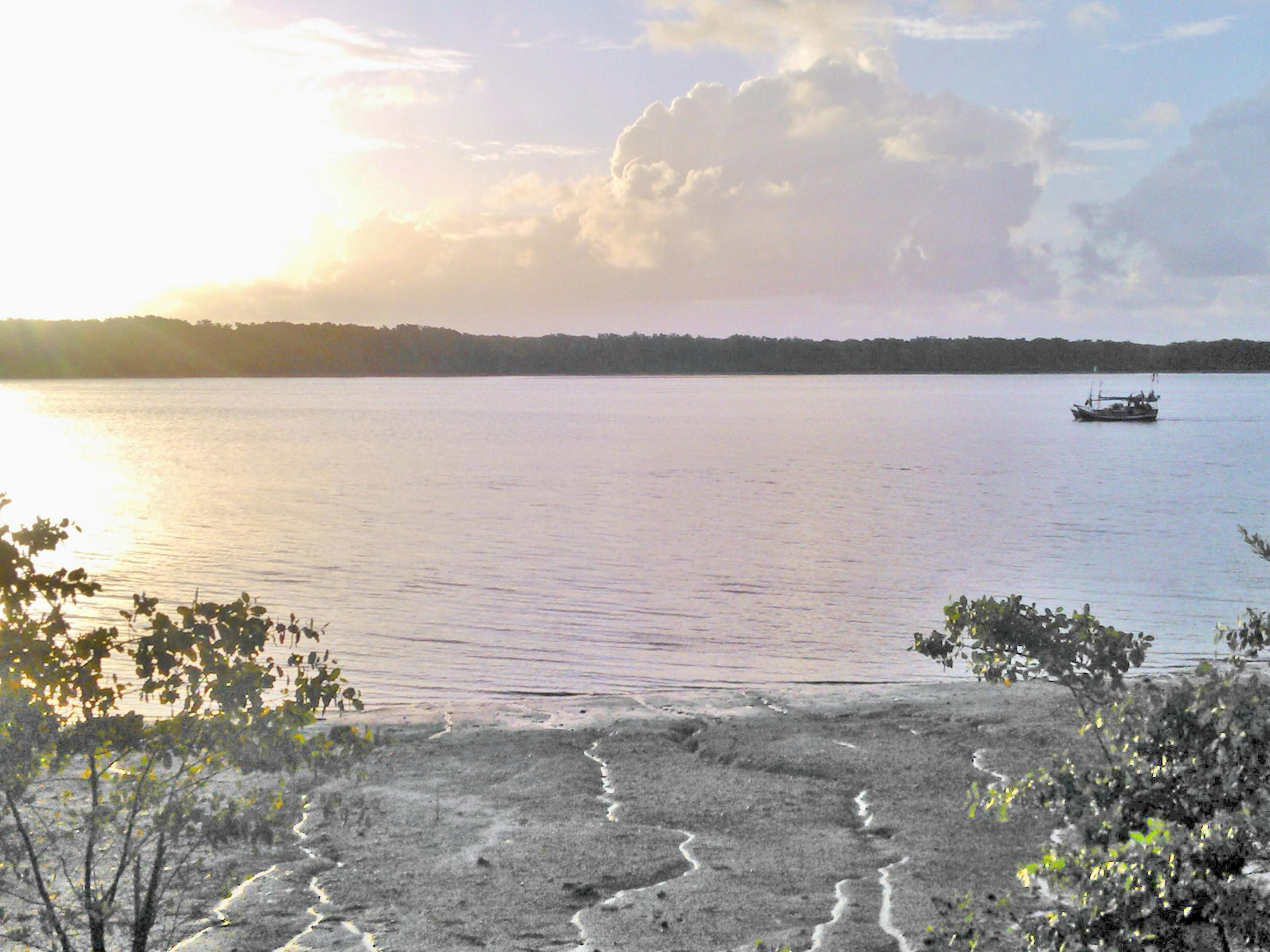
- Evening in Curuçá bay

- Location within Brazil
- Native name: Rio Curuçá (Portuguese)

Location
- Country: Brazil

Physical characteristics
- Source
  - location: State of Pará, Brazil
- Mouth
  - location: Atlantic Ocean
  - coordinates: 0.578701°S 47.836915°W

The Curuçá River (Portuguese: Rio Curuçá) is a river in the state of Pará, Brazil, that flows into the north Atlantic Ocean.

== Course ==
The river flows from south to north past the town of Curuçá, Pará. It is joined from the left by the Furo Maripanema, an arm of the Mocajuba River. The mangroves along the river are protected by the Mãe Grande de Curuçá Extractive Reserve.

== See also ==
- List of rivers of Pará

== Sources ==
- RESEX Marinha Mocapajuba (in Portuguese), ISA: Instituto Socioambiental
