= Maracanã Marine Extractive Reserve =

- Reserva Extrativista Marinha do Maracanã
- IUCN category VI (protected area with sustainable use of natural resources)
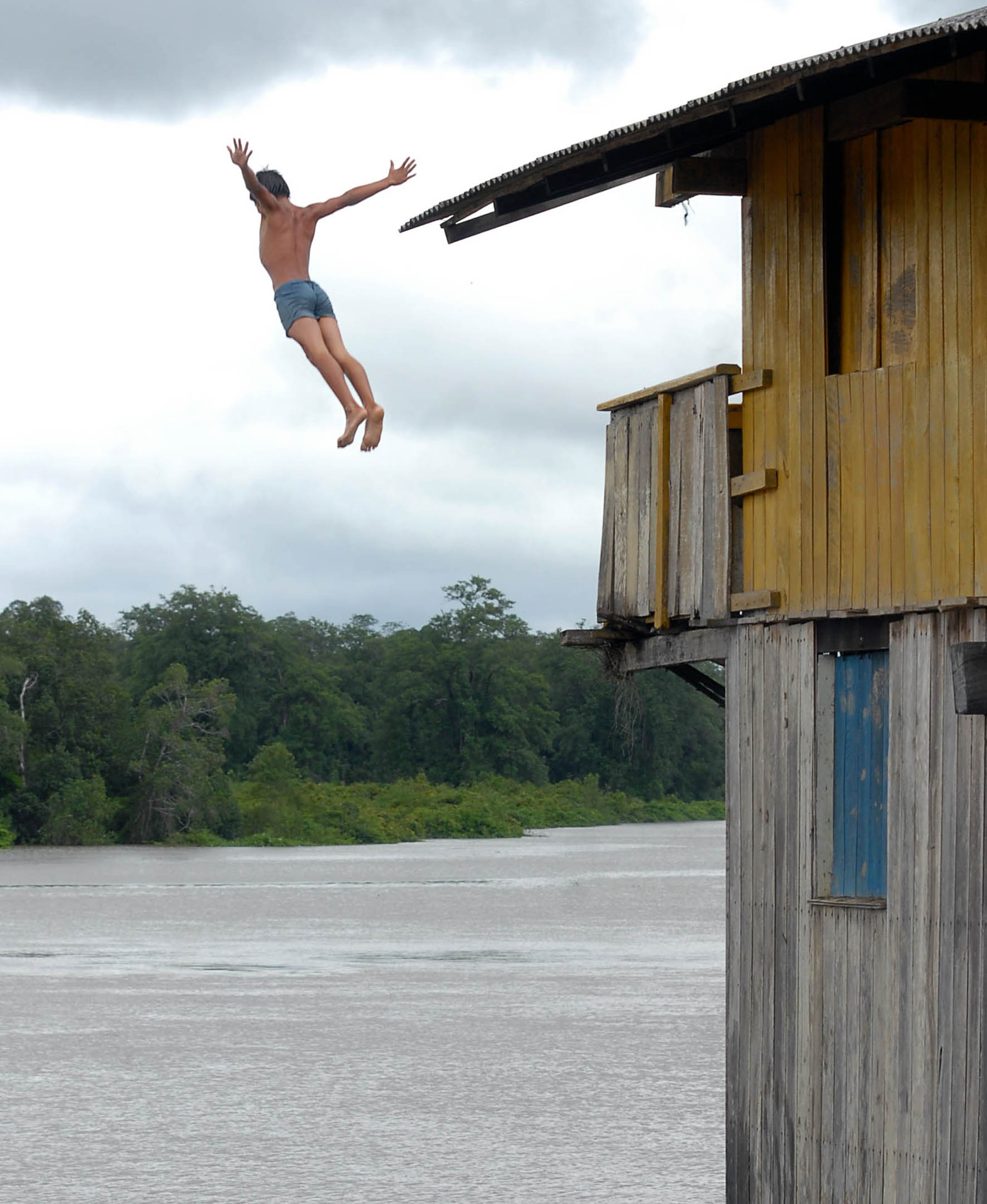
- Boy jumping into Maracanã River

- Location within Brazil
- Nearest city: Maracanã, Pará
- Coordinates: 0°43′20″S 47°27′49″W
- Area: 30,179.20 hectares (74,574.4 acres)
- Designation: Extractive reserve
- Created: 13 December 2002
- Administrator: Chico Mendes Institute for Biodiversity Conservation

The Maracanã Marine Extractive Reserve (Portuguese: Reserva Extrativista Marinha do Maracanã) is a coastal marine extractive reserve in the state of Pará, Brazil. It protects an area of mangroves, and allows the local population to make sustainable use of the natural resources.

== Location ==
Conservation units northeast of Belém: 12. Maracanã Marine Extractive Reserve

The Maracanã Marine Extractive Reserve is in the municipality of Maracanã in the state of Pará. It has an area of 30,179.20 hectares (74,574.4 acres). The municipality of Maracanã was founded in 1653 when father António Vieira arrived in Pará on a mission to the village of Maracanã Indians. Today there are 75 coastal communities in the reserve, mainly living by fishing. Other activities include agriculture, animal husbandry and supporting tourism. The holidays are religious, and include the festivals of Saint Michael the Archangel, Our Lady of Nazareth and Saint Benedict. Handcrafts include construction of fishing vessels and fishing equipment.

The reserve protects the mangroves of the lower reaches of the Maracanã and Caripi rivers and the Maracanã Bay up to Algodoal Island at the northwest of the bay. To the west the reserve protects the eastern side of the bay at the mouth of the Marapanim River south to where the Cuinarana River enters that bay, and the mangroves of the east side of the Cuinarana River. The reserve also protects the mangroves of the east side of the peninsula to the east of Maracanã Bay, opposite the town of Salinópolis.

The Mestre Lucindo Marine Extractive Reserve lies to the west, on the opposite shore of the Marapanim River. Further south, the Cuinarana Marine Extractive Reserve lies to the west on the opposite shore of the Cuinarana River. The Chocoaré - Mato Grosso Extractive Reserve is to the south, higher up the Maracanã River. It adjoins the Algodoal-Maiandeua Environmental Protection Area to the north.

== History ==
The Maracanã Marine Extractive Reserve was created by decree on 13 December 2002 with the objectives of ensuring the sustainable use and conservation of renewable natural resources, while protecting the livelihoods and culture of the local extractive population. The reserve is classified as an IUCN protected area category VI (protected area with sustainable use of natural resources). On 22 June 2005 the Instituto Nacional de Colonização e Reforma Agrária (National Institute for Colonization and Agrarian Reform) recognised the reserve as supporting 1,000 families of small rural producers, allowing them to participate in PRONAF.

On 30 October 2008 the environment ministry authorised a research project by the Museu Paraense Emílio Goeldi entitled "Ethnobotany in the fishing community of Vila da Penha (Maracanã Marine Extractive Reserve): Knowing and Valuing". The deliberative council was created on 29 July 2009. Administrative responsibility was transferred to the Chico Mendes Institute for Biodiversity Conservation (ICMBio) on 22 March 2010. On 23 March 2010 ICMBio granted the right to use the reserve to the Association of Users of the Maracanã Marine Extractive Reserve.

The reserve is supported by the Amazon Region Protected Areas Program.

== Environment ==
The climate is Amazon equatorial, with annual rainfall of about 2,200 millimetres (87 in). Temperatures range from 23 to 33 °C (73 to 91 °F) and average 29 °C (84 °F).

The terrain is flat, with poorly drained clay soil that is flooded by the tides all year. Altitudes range from 0 to 20 metres (0 to 66 ft) above sea level. The reserve protects a typical coastal mangrove ecosystem with trees of the genera Rhizophora, Avicennia and Laguncularia. In the fringe along the left side of Maracanã Bay there are mainly Laguncularia racemosa, followed by Avicennia germinans and Avicennia schaueriana, with a few Rhizophora mangle further inland. The terra firma forest mainly consists of capoeiras.

Birds include white heron, sandpipers and hawks. Crustaceans include crabs, molluscs, oysters and mussels. Mammals include dolphins, monkeys and giant anteater. There are also turtles; and snakes.

== Sources ==
- APA Algodoal-Maiandeua (in Portuguese), ISA: Instituto Socioambiental
- Full list: PAs supported by ARPA, ARPA
- Jeyza Lobato dos Santos (2012), Reserva Extrativista como Alternativa para a Sustentabilidade Local: O Caso da Resex Marinha Maracanã – Pará. (PDF) (in Portuguese), Faculdade de Ciências Sociais, IFCH, UFPA
- Resex Maracanã (in Portuguese), Chico Mendes Institute for Biodiversity Conservation
- RESEX Marinha do Maracanã (in Portuguese), ISA: Instituto Socioambiental
- Unidade de Conservação: Reserva Extrativista Maracanã (in Portuguese), MMA: Ministério do Meio Ambiente
