= Piriá River (Eastern Pará) =

- Location within Brazil
- Native name: Rio Piriá (Portuguese)

Location
- Country: Brazil

Physical characteristics
- Source
  - location: Nova Esperança do Piriá
  - coordinates: 2.472190°S 47.085569°W
- Mouth
  - location: Atlantic Ocean
  - coordinates: 1.021749°S 46.200151°W

The Piriá River (Portuguese: Rio Piriá) is a river in the extreme east of the state of Pará, Brazil.

The river rises in the municipality of Nova Esperança do Piriá, and flows past the municipal seat of Nova Esperança do Piriá. It flows in a generally northeast direction. The lower reaches of the river before it enters the Atlantic Ocean are protected by the Gurupi-Piriá Marine Extractive Reserve.

== See also ==
- List of rivers of Pará

== Sources ==
- RESEX Marinha de Gurupi-Piriá (in Portuguese), ISA: Instituto Socioambiental
