= Maracanã River (Amazonas) =

Location
- Country: Brazil

Physical characteristics
- Source
  - location: Amazonas state
- Mouth
  - coordinates: 8°21′S 59°50′W

Maracanã River is a river of Amazonas state in north-western Brazil.

== See also ==
- List of rivers of Amazonas
