= Arlindo Maracanã =

Brazilian footballer (born 1978)

Personal information
- Full name: Luis Arlindo de Jesus dos Santos
- Date of birth: 2 October 1978 (age 48)
- Place of birth: São Luís, Brazil
- Height: 1.79 m (5 ft 10 in)
- Position: Right-back

Senior career*
Years	Team	Apps	(Gls)
1999–2000	Sampaio Corrêa		
2001	Fluminense		
2001–2002	Ceará		
2002	Vasco da Gama		
2002	Caxias		
2003	Bahia		
2004–2007	Ceará		
2008	Sertãozinho		
2008	Ceará		
2008–2009	Avaí		
2009–2011	Ceará		
2010	→ Brasiliense (loan)		
2011	→ Ferroviário (loan)		
2011–2016	Sampaio Corrêa		

Managerial career
- 2015: Sampaio Corrêa (interim)
- 2017–2018: Sampaio Corrêa (youth)
- 2022: IAPE (U20)
- * Club domestic league appearances and goals

Luis Arlindo de Jesus dos Santos, better known as Arlindo Maracanã or Maracanã (born 2 October 1978) is a Brazilian football coach and a former right-back.

== Honours ==
Sampaio Corrêa

- Campeonato Brasileiro Série C: 1997
- Campeonato Brasileiro Série D: 2012
- Campeonato Maranhense: 2012, 2014
- Copa União do Maranhão: 2011, 2012

Avaí

- Campeonato Catarinense: 2009

Ceará

- Campeonato Cearense: 2002, 2006

== Contract ==
- Ceará.
