= São João da Ponta =

Coordinates: 0°50′S 47°55′W

- Municipality
- Interactive map of São João da Ponta
- Country: Brazil
- Region: Northern
- State: Pará
- Mesoregion: Nordeste Paraense

Population (2020)
  - Total: 6,217
- Time zone: UTC−3 (BRT)

São João da Ponta is a municipality in the state of Pará in the Northern region of Brazil.

== See also ==
- List of municipalities in Pará
